= 2020 Open Sud de France =

ATP tennis competition, France

- Date: 3–9 February 2020
- Edition: 33rd
- Draw: 28S / 16D
- Surface: Hard (indoor)
- Location: Montpellier, France
- Venue: Sud de France Arena

Champions

Singles
- (France) Gaël Monfils

Doubles
- (Serbia) Nikola Ćaćić / (Croatia) Mate Pavić
← 2019 ·	Open Sud de France	· 2021 →

The 2020 Open Sud de France was a men's tennis tournament played on indoor hard courts. It was the 33rd edition of the event, and part of the ATP Tour 250 series of the 2020 ATP Tour. It took place at the Arena Montpellier in Montpellier, France, from 3 February until 9 February 2020. Gaël Monfils won the singles title.

== Finals ==
=== Singles ===
- (France) Gaël Monfils defeated (Canada) Vasek Pospisil, 7–5, 6–3

=== Doubles ===
- (Serbia) Nikola Ćaćić / (Croatia) Mate Pavić defeated (United Kingdom) Dominic Inglot / (Pakistan) Aisam-ul-Haq Qureshi, 6–4, 6–7^{(4–7)}, [10–4]

== Singles main-draw entrants ==
=== Seeds ===
Country	Player	Rank^{1}	Seed
FRA	Gaël Monfils	10	1
BEL	David Goffin	11	2
CAN	Denis Shapovalov	13	3
BUL	Grigor Dimitrov	20	4
CAN	Félix Auger-Aliassime	22	5
ESP	Pablo Carreño Busta	30	6
SRB	Filip Krajinović	41	7
FRA	Ugo Humbert	43	8

- ^{1} Rankings are as of January 20, 2020.

=== Other entrants ===
The following players received wildcards into the singles main draw:

- (Canada) Félix Auger-Aliassime
- (Bulgaria) Grigor Dimitrov
- (France) Gaël Monfils

The following player received entry using a protected ranking into the singles main draw:

- (Canada) Vasek Pospisil

The following players received entry from the qualifying draw:

- (France) Enzo Couacaud
- (Bosnia and Herzegovina) Damir Džumhur
- (Finland) Emil Ruusuvuori
- (Ukraine) Sergiy Stakhovsky

=== Withdrawals ===
Before the tournament

- (Moldova) Radu Albot → replaced by (France) Grégoire Barrère
- (United Kingdom) Dan Evans → replaced by (Slovakia) Norbert Gombos
- (Italy) Fabio Fognini → replaced by (France) Pierre-Hugues Herbert
- (Australia) John Millman → replaced by (Italy) Jannik Sinner
- (France) Lucas Pouille → replaced by (Sweden) Mikael Ymer
- (Russia) Andrey Rublev → replaced by (Switzerland) Henri Laaksonen
- (Switzerland) Stan Wawrinka → replaced by (Austria) Dennis Novak

=== Retirements ===
- (France) Richard Gasquet

== ATP doubles main-draw entrants ==
=== Seeds ===
Country	Player	Country	Player	Rank^{1}	Seed
GER	Kevin Krawietz	FRA	Nicolas Mahut	11	1
NED	Jean-Julien Rojer	ROU	Horia Tecău	39	2
AUT	Jürgen Melzer	FRA	Édouard Roger-Vasselin	52	3
GBR	Jamie Murray	GBR	Neal Skupski	56	4

- ^{1} Rankings as of January 20, 2020.

=== Other entrants ===
The following pairs received wildcards into the doubles main draw:

- (France) Kenny de Schepper / (France) Hugo Gaston
- (Spain) Feliciano López / (Spain) Marc López

The following pair received entry as alternates:

- (Austria) Julian Knowle / (Austria) Dennis Novak

=== Withdrawals ===
Before the tournament

- (Germany) Tim Pütz
