= 2018 Open Sud de France =

- Date: 5–11 February 2018
- Edition: 31st
- Draw: 28S / 16D
- Prize money: €482,060
- Surface: Hard (Indoor)
- Location: Montpellier, France
- Venue: Arena Montpellier

Champions

Singles
- (France) Lucas Pouille

Doubles
- (United Kingdom) Ken Skupski / (United Kingdom) Neal Skupski
← 2017 ·	Open Sud de France	· 2019 →

The 2018 Open Sud de France was a men's tennis tournament played on indoor hard courts. It was the 31st edition of the Open Sud de France, and part of the ATP World Tour 250 Series of the 2018 ATP World Tour. It took place at the Arena Montpellier in Montpellier, France, from February 5 to February 11, 2018.

== Points and prize money ==
=== Point distribution ===
Event	W	F	SF	QF	Round of 16	Round of 32	Q	Q2	Q1
Singles	250	150	90	45	20	0	12	6	0
Doubles	250	150	90	45	0	—	—	—	—

=== Prize money ===
Event	W	F	SF	QF	Round of 16	Round of 32	Q2	Q1
Singles	€85,945	€45,265	€24,520	€13,970	€8,230	€4,875	€2,195	€1,100
Doubles	€26,110	€13,730	€7,440	€4,260	€2,490	—	—	—
Doubles prize money per team

== Singles main-draw entrants ==
=== Seeds ===
Country	Player	Rank^{1}	Seed
BEL	David Goffin	7	1
FRA	Lucas Pouille	17	2
FRA	Jo-Wilfried Tsonga	19	3
BIH	Damir Džumhur	30	4
FRA	Richard Gasquet	33	5
RUS	Andrey Rublev	35	6
ESP	David Ferrer	39	7
JPN	Yūichi Sugita	41	8

- ^{1} Rankings are as of January 29, 2018.

=== Other entrants ===
The following players received wildcards into the singles main draw:

- (France) Julien Benneteau
- (France) Calvin Hemery
- (France) Lucas Pouille

The following players received entry into the singles main draw using a protected ranking:

- (Lithuania) Ričardas Berankis
- (Australia) John Millman

The following players received entry from the qualifying draw:

- (France) Kenny de Schepper
- (Slovakia) Norbert Gombos
- (Germany) Yannick Maden
- (Spain) Carlos Taberner

=== Withdrawals ===
Before the tournament

- (Czech Republic) Tomáš Berdych →replaced by (Germany) Dustin Brown
- (Belgium) Steve Darcis →replaced by (France) Nicolas Mahut
- (Germany) Peter Gojowczyk →replaced by (Belgium) Ruben Bemelmans

=== Retirements ===
- (Germany) Dustin Brown
- (France) Jo-Wilfried Tsonga

== ATP doubles main-draw entrants ==
=== Seeds ===
Country	Player	Country	Player	Rank^{1}	Seed
CRO	Ivan Dodig	USA	Rajeev Ram	30	1
NZL	Marcus Daniell	GBR	Dominic Inglot	80	2
CZE	Roman Jebavý	BLR	Andrei Vasilevski	107	3
JPN	Ben McLachlan	FRA	Hugo Nys	112	4

- ^{1} Rankings as of January 29, 2018.

=== Other entrants ===
The following pairs received wildcards into the doubles main draw:

- (France) Benjamin Bonzi / (France) Hugo Gaston
- (France) Calvin Hemery / (France) Vincent Millot

=== Withdrawals ===
During the tournament

- (Germany) Dustin Brown / (France) Benoît Paire

== Finals ==
=== Singles ===
- (France) Lucas Pouille defeated (France) Richard Gasquet, 7–6^{(7–2)}, 6–4

=== Doubles ===
- (United Kingdom) Ken Skupski / (United Kingdom) Neal Skupski defeated (Japan) Ben McLachlan / (France) Hugo Nys, 7–6^{(7–2)}, 6–4
