= 2021 Open Sud de France =

ATP tennis competition, France

- Date: 22–28 February 2021
- Edition: 34th
- Draw: 28S / 16D
- Prize money: €323,970
- Surface: Indoor hard courts
- Location: Montpellier, France
- Venue: Sud de France Arena

Champions

Singles
- (Belgium) David Goffin

Doubles
- (Finland) Henri Kontinen / (France) Édouard Roger-Vasselin
← 2020 ·	Open Sud de France	· 2022 →

The 2021 Open Sud de France was a men's tennis tournament played on indoor hard courts. It is the 34th edition of the event, and part of the ATP Tour 250 series of the 2021 ATP Tour. It takes place at the Arena Montpellier in Montpellier, France, from 22 February until 28 February 2021.

== Finals ==
=== Singles ===
- (Belgium) David Goffin defeated (Spain) Roberto Bautista Agut, 5–7, 6–4, 6–2.

=== Doubles ===
- (Finland) Henri Kontinen / (France) Édouard Roger-Vasselin defeated (Israel) Jonathan Erlich / (Belarus) Andrei Vasilevski, 6–2, 7–5.

== Points and prize money ==
=== Point distribution ===
Event	W	F	SF	QF	Round of 16	Round of 32	Q	Q2	Q1
Singles	250	150	90	45	20	0	12	6	0
Doubles	250	150	90	45	0	—	—	—	—

=== Prize money ===
Event	W	F	SF	QF	Round of 16	Round of 32	Q2	Q1
Singles	€21,655	€16,000	€12,000	€8,200	€5,600	€4,000	€2,050	€1,130
Doubles*	€7,550	€5,530	€4,200	€3,010	€2,200	—	—	—
Doubles prize money per team

== Singles main-draw entrants ==
=== Seeds ===
Country	Player	Rank^{1}	Seed
ESP	Roberto Bautista Agut	13	1
BEL	David Goffin	15	2
SRB	Dušan Lajović	27	3
POL	Hubert Hurkacz	30	4
ITA	Jannik Sinner	32	5
FRA	Ugo Humbert	34	6
ITA	Lorenzo Sonego	35	7
GER	Jan-Lennard Struff	37	8

- ^{1} Rankings are as of February 8, 2021.

=== Other entrants ===
The following players received wildcards into the singles main draw:

- (France) Benjamin Bonzi
- (France) Hugo Gaston
- (United Kingdom) Andy Murray

The following players received entry from the qualifying draw:

- (France) Grégoire Barrère
- (Germany) Peter Gojowczyk
- (Netherlands) Tallon Griekspoor
- (Spain) Bernabé Zapata Miralles

=== Withdrawals ===
- (Spain) Pablo Carreño Busta → replaced by (Austria) Dennis Novak
- (United Kingdom) Kyle Edmund → replaced by (France) Gilles Simon
- (France) Richard Gasquet → replaced by (United States) Sebastian Korda
- (Serbia) Filip Krajinović → replaced by (Czech Republic) Jiří Veselý
- (Australia) Nick Kyrgios → replaced by (Slovakia) Norbert Gombos
- (Spain) Feliciano López → replaced by (Sweden) Mikael Ymer
- (United States) Reilly Opelka → replaced by (United States) Marcos Giron

== ATP doubles main-draw entrants ==
=== Seeds ===
Country	Player	Country	Player	Rank^{1}	Seed
FIN	Henri Kontinen	FRA	Édouard Roger-Vasselin	46	1
ESA	Marcelo Arévalo	NED	Matwé Middelkoop	99	2
DNK	Frederik Nielsen	GER	Tim Pütz	117	3
IND	Divij Sharan	SVK	Igor Zelenay	138	4

- ^{1} Rankings as of January 25, 2021.

=== Other entrants ===
The following pairs received wildcards into the doubles main draw:

- (Belgium) David Goffin / (France) Lucas Pouille
- (France) Fabrice Martin / (France) Gilles Simon

The following pair received entry into the main draw using a protected ranking:

- (Serbia) Dušan Lajović / (Spain) Marc López
