= 2019 Open Sud de France =

ATP tennis competition, France

- Date: 4–10 February 2019
- Edition: 32nd
- Category: World Tour 250 Series
- Draw: 28S / 16D
- Surface: Hard (Indoor)
- Location: Montpellier, France
- Venue: Sud de France Arena

Champions

Singles
- (France) Jo-Wilfried Tsonga

Doubles
- (Croatia) Ivan Dodig / (France) Édouard Roger-Vasselin
← 2018 ·	Open Sud de France	· 2020 →

The 2019 Open Sud de France was a men's tennis tournament played on indoor hard courts. It was the 32nd edition of the event, and part of the ATP Tour 250 Series of the 2019 ATP Tour. It took place at the Arena Montpellier in Montpellier, France, from 4 February until 10 February 2019. Unseeded Jo-Wilfried Tsonga, who entered the main draw on a wildcard, won the singles title,

== Finals ==
=== Singles ===
(France) Jo-Wilfried Tsonga defeated (France) Pierre-Hugues Herbert, 6–4, 6–2

- It was Tsonga's 1st singles title of the year and the 17th of his career.

=== Doubles ===
(Croatia) Ivan Dodig / (France) Édouard Roger-Vasselin defeated (France) Benjamin Bonzi / (France) Antoine Hoang, 6–3, 6–3

== Singles main-draw entrants ==
=== Seeds ===
Country	Player	Rank^{1}	Seed
FRA	Lucas Pouille	17	1
BEL	David Goffin	21	2
CAN	Denis Shapovalov	25	3
FRA	Gilles Simon	31	4
GER	Philipp Kohlschreiber	32	5
FRA	Jérémy Chardy	35	6
FRA	Pierre-Hugues Herbert	44	7
FRA	Benoît Paire	58	8

- ^{1} Rankings are as of 28 January 2019.

=== Other entrants ===
The following players received wildcards into the singles main draw:

- (France) Ugo Humbert
- (Canada) Denis Shapovalov
- (France) Jo-Wilfried Tsonga

The following player received entry using a protected ranking into the singles main draw:

- (Belgium) Steve Darcis

The following players received entry from the qualifying draw:

- (Germany) Matthias Bachinger
- (Cyprus) Marcos Baghdatis
- (France) Antoine Hoang
- (France) Nicolas Mahut

The following players received entry as lucky losers:

- (Belgium) Ruben Bemelmans
- (Spain) Adrián Menéndez Maceiras

=== Withdrawals ===
- (France) Richard Gasquet → replaced by (Croatia) Ivo Karlović
- (Germany) Peter Gojowczyk → replaced by (Italy) Thomas Fabbiano
- (Canada) Vasek Pospisil → replaced by (Russia) Evgeny Donskoy
- (Germany) Cedrik-Marcel Stebe → replaced by (Moldova) Radu Albot
- (Czech Republic) Jiří Veselý → replaced by (Belgium) Ruben Bemelmans
- (Germany) Mischa Zverev → replaced by (Spain) Adrián Menéndez Maceiras

== ATP doubles main-draw entrants ==
=== Seeds ===
Country	Player	Country	Player	Rank^{1}	Seed
CRO	Ivan Dodig	FRA	Édouard Roger-Vasselin	61	1
USA	Austin Krajicek	NZL	Artem Sitak	78	2
GBR	Ken Skupski	GBR	Neal Skupski	84	3
MDA	Radu Albot	ESP	Marcel Granollers	90	4

- ^{1} Rankings as of January 28, 2019.

=== Other entrants ===
The following pairs received wildcards into the doubles main draw:

- (France) Benjamin Bonzi / (France) Antoine Hoang
- (France) Constant Lestienne / (France) Lucas Pouille
