= 2021 Open Sud de France – Doubles =

Doubles
- 2021 Open Sud de France

Final
- Champions: (Finland) Henri Kontinen; (France) Édouard Roger-Vasselin
- Runners-up: (Israel) Jonathan Erlich; (Belarus) Andrei Vasilevski
- Score: 6–2, 7–5

Details
- Draw: 16
- Seeds: 4

Events
Singles	Doubles
← 2020 ·	Open Sud de France	· 2022 →

Nikola Ćaćić and Mate Pavić were the defending champions, but they chose not to participate this year. Henri Kontinen and Édouard Roger-Vasselin won the title, defeating Jonathan Erlich and Andrei Vasilevski in the final, 6–2, 7–5.

== Seeds ==
1. (Finland) Henri Kontinen / (France) Édouard Roger-Vasselin (champions)
2. (El Salvador) Marcelo Arévalo / (Netherlands) Matwé Middelkoop (quarterfinals)
3. (Denmark) Frederik Nielsen / (Germany) Tim Pütz (first round)
4. (India) Divij Sharan / (Slovakia) Igor Zelenay (first round)

== Draw ==
=== Key ===
- Q = Qualifier
- WC = Wild card
- LL = Lucky loser
- Alt = Alternate
- SE = Special exempt
- PR = Protected ranking
- ITF = ITF entry
- JE = Junior exempt
- w/o = Walkover
- r = Retired
- d = Defaulted
- SR = Special ranking

=== Draw ===
First round

Quarterfinals

Semifinals

Final

1
(Finland) H Kontinen
(France) É Roger-Vasselin
6^{5}
6
[10]

- (Poland) H Hurkacz
- (Poland) S Walków
7^{7}
2
[8]

1
(Finland) H Kontinen
(France) É Roger-Vasselin
6
6

- (Kazakhstan) A Golubev
- (Monaco) H Nys
3
4

- (France) U Humbert
- (France) J-W Tsonga
3
4

(France) U Humbert
(France) J-W Tsonga
6
6

1
(Finland) H Kontinen
(France) É Roger-Vasselin
6
6

3
- (Denmark) F Nielsen
- (Germany) T Pütz
4
6
[5]

- (Czech Republic) R Jebavý
- (Czech Republic) J Veselý
4
3

(Czech Republic) R Jebavý
(Czech Republic) J Veselý
6
3
[10]

(Czech Republic) R Jebavý
(Czech Republic) J Veselý
6
7

PR
- (Serbia) D Lajović
- (Spain) M López
4
4

- (Netherlands) S Arends
- (Italy) A Vavassori
4
5

(Netherlands) S Arends
(Italy) A Vavassori
6
6

1
(Finland) H Kontinen
(France) É Roger-Vasselin
6
7

(Sweden) A Göransson
(Netherlands) D Pel
7^{8}
3
[10]

- (Israel) J Erlich
- (Belarus) A Vasilevski
2
5

WC
- (Belgium) D Goffin
- (France) L Pouille
6^{6}
6
[8]

- (Sweden) A Göransson
- (Netherlands) D Pel
4
6
[7]

(Israel) J Erlich
(Belarus) A Vasilevski
7
6

(Israel) J Erlich
(Belarus) A Vasilevski
6
4
[10]

4
- (India) D Sharan
- (Slovakia) I Zelenay
5
3

(Israel) J Erlich
(Belarus) A Vasilevski
7^{10}
6

(United States) N Lammons
(United States) J Withrow
6
6^{4}
[10]

- (United States) N Lammons
- (United States) J Withrow
6^{8}
4

WC
- (France) F Martin
- (France) G Simon
4
7^{7}
[6]

(United States) N Lammons
(United States) J Withrow
6
7^{8}

- (Spain) A Davidovich Fokina
- (Spain) B Zapata Miralles
4
5

2
- (El Salvador) M Arévalo
- (Netherlands) M Middelkoop
4
6^{6}

2
(El Salvador) M Arévalo
(Netherlands) M Middelkoop
6
7
