= 2018 Open Sud de France – Doubles =

Doubles
- 2018 Open Sud de France

Final
- Champions: (United Kingdom) Ken Skupski (United Kingdom) Neal Skupski
- Runners-up: (Japan) Ben McLachlan (France) Hugo Nys
- Score: 7–6^{(7–2)}, 6–4

Details
- Draw: 16
- Seeds: 4

Events
Singles	Doubles
← 2017 ·	Open Sud de France	· 2019 →

Alexander and Mischa Zverev were the defending champions, but Alexander chose not to participate this year. Mischa played alongside Karen Khachanov, but lost in the first round to Ben McLachlan and Hugo Nys.

Ken and Neal Skupski won the title, defeating McLachlan and Nys in the final, 7–6^{(7–2)}, 6–4.

== Seeds ==
1. (Croatia) Ivan Dodig / (United States) Rajeev Ram (first round)
2. (New Zealand) Marcus Daniell / (United Kingdom) Dominic Inglot (first round)
3. (Czech Republic) Roman Jebavý / (Belarus) Andrei Vasilevski (first round)
4. (Japan) Ben McLachlan / (France) Hugo Nys (final)

== Draw ==
=== Key ===
- Q = Qualifier
- WC = Wild card
- LL = Lucky loser
- Alt = Alternate
- SE = Special exempt
- PR = Protected ranking
- ITF = ITF entry
- JE = Junior exempt
- w/o = Walkover
- r = Retired
- d = Defaulted
- SR = Special ranking

=== Draw ===
First round
1	(Croatia) I Dodig (United States) R Ram	6	5	[0]
(Netherlands) W Koolhof (New Zealand) A Sitak	2	7	[10]
(Netherlands) S Arends (Croatia) A Šančić	5	6	[10]
(Spain) G García López (Spain) D Marrero	7	2	[8]
4	(Japan) B McLachlan (France) H Nys	6	6
(Russia) K Khachanov (Germany) M Zverev	4	4
(Germany) D Brown (France) B Paire	7	6
WC	(France) C Hemery (France) V Millot	5	3
(France) T Lamasine (France) L Pouille	7^{7}	7
(Russia) M Elgin (Russia) A Rublev	6^{2}	5
(Germany) A Begemann (France) J Eysseric	7^{8}	6^{5}	[10]
3	(Czech Republic) R Jebavý (Belarus) A Vasilevski	6^{6}	7^{7}	[7]
WC	(France) B Bonzi (France) H Gaston	6^{4}	5
(France) J Chardy (France) F Martin	7^{7}	7
(United Kingdom) K Skupski (United Kingdom) N Skupski	7^{7}	7^{9}
2	(New Zealand) M Daniell (United Kingdom) D Inglot	6^{1}	6^{7}

Quarterfinals
(Netherlands) W Koolhof (New Zealand) A Sitak	6	4	[5]
(Netherlands) S Arends (Croatia) A Šančić	3	6	[10]
4	(Japan) B McLachlan (France) H Nys	w/o
(Germany) D Brown (France) B Paire
(France) T Lamasine (France) L Pouille	3	6	[10]
(Germany) A Begemann (France) J Eysseric	6	3	[4]
(France) J Chardy (France) F Martin	3	4
(United Kingdom) K Skupski (United Kingdom) N Skupski	6	6

Semifinals
(Netherlands) S Arends (Croatia) A Šančić	6	2	[6]
4	(Japan) B McLachlan (France) H Nys	4	6	[10]
(France) T Lamasine (France) L Pouille	7^{7}	4	[5]
(United Kingdom) K Skupski (United Kingdom) N Skupski	6^{5}	6	[10]

Final
4	(Japan) B McLachlan (France) H Nys	6^{2}	4
(United Kingdom) K Skupski (United Kingdom) N Skupski	7^{7}	6
