= 2021 Open Sud de France – Singles =

Singles
- 2021 Open Sud de France

Final
- Champion: (Belgium) David Goffin
- Runner-up: (Spain) Roberto Bautista Agut
- Score: 5–7, 6–4, 6–2

Details
- Draw: 28 (4 Q / 3 WC )
- Seeds: 8

Events
Singles	Doubles
- Open Sud de France

Gaël Monfils was the defending champion, but chose not to defend his title.

David Goffin won the title, defeating Roberto Bautista Agut in the final, 5–7, 6–4, 6–2.

With the loss of Ugo Humbert in the quarterfinals, this was the first tournament without a French champion since 2017 when Alexander Zverev won the title. It was also the first without a French finalist since 2004.

== Seeds ==
The top four seeds received a bye into the second round.

1. (Spain) Roberto Bautista Agut (final)
2. (Belgium) David Goffin (champion)
3. (Serbia) Dušan Lajović (second round)
4. (Poland) Hubert Hurkacz (second round)
5. (Italy) Jannik Sinner (first round)
6. (France) Ugo Humbert (quarterfinals)
7. (Italy) Lorenzo Sonego (quarterfinals)
8. (Germany) Jan-Lennard Struff (first round)

== Draw ==
Key

- Q = Qualifier
- WC = Wild card
- LL = Lucky loser
- Alt = Alternate
- ITF = ITF entry
- PR = Protected ranking
- SR = Special ranking
- SE = Special exempt
- JE = Junior exempt
- JR = Junior Accelerator Programme entrant
- CO = College Accelerator Programme entrant
- NG = Next Gen Accelerator Program entrant
- w/o = Walkover
- r = Retired
- d = Defaulted

=== Finals ===
Semifinals
1	(Spain) Roberto Bautista Agut	7	6
Q	(Germany) Peter Gojowczyk	5	1
(Belarus) Egor Gerasimov	4	6	4
2	(Belgium) David Goffin	6	2	6

Final
1	(Spain) Roberto Bautista Agut	7	4	2
2	(Belgium) David Goffin	5	6	6

=== Top half ===
First round
Q	(France) G Barrère	6	6
(Georgia (country)) N Basilashvili	4	4
Q	(Netherlands) T Griekspoor	6	6^{5}	6
(United States) M Giron	2	7^{7}	3
(Slovakia) N Gombos	3	6^{3}
6	(France) U Humbert	6	7^{7}
(Austria) D Novak	7^{7}	1	6
(France) G Simon	6^{5}	6	3
(Sweden) M Ymer	1	1
(Czech Republic) J Veselý	6	6
Q	(Germany) P Gojowczyk	6	6
8	(Germany) J-L Struff	3	4

Second round
1	(Spain) R Bautista Agut	6	6
Q	(France) G Barrère	0	3
Q	(Netherlands) T Griekspoor	7^{7}	6^{5}	6^{5}
6	(France) U Humbert	6^{4}	7^{7}	7^{7}
3	(Serbia) D Lajović	6^{5}	5
(Austria) D Novak	7^{7}	7
(Czech Republic) J Veselý	7^{7}	6^{4}	3
Q	(Germany) P Gojowczyk	6^{3}	7^{7}	6

Quarterfinals
1	(Spain) R Bautista Agut	6	6
6	(France) U Humbert	3	3
(Austria) D Novak	4	1
Q	(Germany) P Gojowczyk	6	6

Semifinals
1	(Spain) R Bautista Agut	7	6
Q	(Germany) P Gojowczyk	5	1

=== Bottom half ===
First round
5	(Italy) J Sinner	6	2	6^{3}
(Slovenia) A Bedene	3	6	7^{7}
(Belarus) E Gerasimov	7^{10}	6
WC	(United Kingdom) A Murray	6^{8}	1
Q	(Spain) B Zapata Miralles	6^{3}	7	2
(Spain) A Davidovich Fokina	7^{7}	5	6
7	(Italy) L Sonego	6	6^{7}	6
WC	(France) H Gaston	3	7^{9}	1
(France) J-W Tsonga	4	2
(United States) S Korda	6	6
(France) L Pouille	6^{6}	2
WC	(France) B Bonzi	7^{8}	6

Second round
(Slovenia) A Bedene	4	6^{4}
(Belarus) E Gerasimov	6	7^{7}
(Spain) A Davidovich Fokina	7	6
4	(Poland) H Hurkacz	5	2
7	(Italy) L Sonego	6	6
(United States) S Korda	3	2
WC	(France) B Bonzi	6	4	5
2	(Belgium) D Goffin	4	6	7

Quarterfinals
(Belarus) E Gerasimov	4	6	7
(Spain) A Davidovich Fokina	6	4	5
7	(Italy) L Sonego	4	4
2	(Belgium) D Goffin	6	6

Semifinals
(Belarus) E Gerasimov	4	6	4
2	(Belgium) D Goffin	6	2	6

== Qualifying ==
=== Seeds ===
1. (Poland) Kamil Majchrzak (first round)
2. (France) Grégoire Barrère (qualified)
3. (France) Antoine Hoang (qualifying competition)
4. (Bosnia and Herzegovina) Damir Džumhur (first round)
5. (France) Arthur Rinderknech (first round)
6. (Spain) Carlos Alcaraz (first round)
7. (Spain) Bernabé Zapata Miralles (qualified)
8. (Germany) Peter Gojowczyk (qualified)

=== Qualifiers ===
1. (Germany) Peter Gojowczyk
2. (France) Grégoire Barrère
3. (Netherlands) Tallon Griekspoor
4. (Spain) Bernabé Zapata Miralles

=== Qualifying draw ===
==== First qualifier ====
First round
1	(Poland) Kamil Majchrzak	6	4	4
(Slovakia) Lukáš Lacko	4	6	6
(France) Maxime Janvier	0^{r}
8	(Germany) Peter Gojowczyk	1

Qualifying competition
(Slovakia) Lukáš Lacko	2	1
8	(Germany) Peter Gojowczyk	6	6

==== Second qualifier ====
First round
2	(France) Grégoire Barrère	2	6	6
(France) Quentin Halys	6	2	4
(Netherlands) Botic van de Zandschulp	6	7
5	(France) Arthur Rinderknech	2	5

Qualifying competition
2	(France) Grégoire Barrère	4	6	6
(Netherlands) Botic van de Zandschulp	6	3	4

==== Third qualifier ====
First round
3	(France) Antoine Hoang	6	6
WC	(France) Luca Van Assche	4	0
(Netherlands) Tallon Griekspoor	4	6	6
6	(Spain) Carlos Alcaraz	6	3	1

Qualifying competition
3	(France) Antoine Hoang	6^{2}	3
(Netherlands) Tallon Griekspoor	7^{7}	6

==== Fourth qualifier ====
First round
4	(Bosnia and Herzegovina) Damir Džumhur	7^{7}	6^{6}	3
WC	(France) Kyrian Jacquet	6^{4}	7^{8}	6
(Ukraine) Sergiy Stakhovsky	1	0
7	(Spain) Bernabé Zapata Miralles	6	6

Qualifying competition
WC	(France) Kyrian Jacquet	1	1
7	(Spain) Bernabé Zapata Miralles	6	6
