= 2017 Open Sud de France =

- Date: 6–12 February 2017
- Edition: 30th
- Draw: 28S / 16D
- Prize money: €482,060
- Surface: Indoor hard courts
- Location: Montpellier, France

Champions

Singles
- (Germany) Alexander Zverev

Doubles
- (Germany) Alexander Zverev / (Germany) Mischa Zverev
← 2016 ·	Open Sud de France	· 2018 →

The 2017 Open Sud de France was a tennis tournament played on indoor hard courts. It was the 30th edition of the Open Sud de France, and part of the ATP World Tour 250 Series of the 2017 ATP World Tour. It took place at the Arena Montpellier in Montpellier, France, from February 6 to February 12, 2017.

== Points and prize money ==
=== Point distribution ===
Event	W	F	SF	QF	Round of 16	Round of 32	Q	Q2	Q1
Singles	250	150	90	45	20	0	12	6	0
Doubles	250	150	90	45	0	—	—	—	—

=== Prize money ===
Event	W	F	SF	QF	Round of 16	Round of 32	Q2	Q1
Singles	€85,945	€45,265	€24,520	€13,970	€8,230	€4,875	€2,195	€1,100
Doubles	€26,110	€13,730	€7,440	€4,260	€2,490	—	—	—
Doubles prize money per team

== Singles main-draw entrants ==
=== Seeds ===
Country	Player	Rank^{1}	Seed
CRO	Marin Čilić	7	1
FRA	Jo-Wilfried Tsonga	14	2
FRA	Richard Gasquet	18	3
GER	Alexander Zverev	22	4
ESP	Feliciano López	33	5
GER	Mischa Zverev	35	6
ESP	Marcel Granollers	39	7
ESP	Fernando Verdasco	40	8

- ^{1} Rankings are as of January 30, 2017.

=== Other entrants ===
The following players received wildcards into the singles main draw:

- (France) Quentin Halys
- (Spain) Feliciano López
- (Germany) Alexander Zverev

The following players received entry from the qualifying draw:

- (France) Julien Benneteau
- (France) Calvin Hemery
- (France) Tristan Lamasine
- (France) Kenny de Schepper

The following players received entry as lucky losers:

- (France) Grégoire Barrère
- (France) Vincent Millot

=== Withdrawals ===
Before the tournament

- (United Kingdom) Dan Evans →replaced by (France) Grégoire Barrère
- (Germany) Florian Mayer →replaced by (United Kingdom) Aljaž Bedene
- (Czech Republic) Adam Pavlásek →replaced by (Russia) Daniil Medvedev
- (France) Gilles Simon →replaced by (Germany) Tobias Kamke
- (Germany) Jan-Lennard Struff →replaced by (France) Vincent Millot

=== Retirements ===
- (Germany) Dustin Brown

== Doubles main-draw entrants ==
=== Seeds ===
Country	Player	Country	Player	Rank^{1}	Seed
ESP	Feliciano López	ESP	Marc López	22	1
FRA	Fabrice Martin	CAN	Daniel Nestor	58	2
SWE	Robert Lindstedt	NZL	Michael Venus	76	3
NZL	Marcus Daniell	BRA	Marcelo Demoliner	100	4

- ^{1} Rankings are as of January 30, 2017.

=== Other entrants ===
The following pair received a wildcard into the doubles main draw:

- (France) Quentin Halys / (France) Tristan Lamasine

The following pair received entry as alternates:

- (Croatia) Borna Ćorić / (France) Benoît Paire

=== Withdrawals ===
Before the tournament

- (Spain) Marcel Granollers
- (Russia) Karen Khachanov
- (France) Paul-Henri Mathieu
- (India) Leander Paes

== Finals ==
=== Singles ===
- (Germany) Alexander Zverev defeated (France) Richard Gasquet, 7–6^{(7–4)}, 6–3

=== Doubles ===
- (Germany) Alexander Zverev / (Germany) Mischa Zverev defeated (France) Fabrice Martin / (Canada) Daniel Nestor, 6–4, 6–7^{(3–7)}, [10–7]
