= 2019 Open Sud de France – Doubles =

Doubles
- 2019 Open Sud de France

Final
- Champions: (Croatia) Ivan Dodig (France) Édouard Roger-Vasselin
- Runners-up: (France) Benjamin Bonzi (France) Antoine Hoang
- Score: 6–4, 6–3

Details
- Draw: 16
- Seeds: 4

Events
Singles	Doubles
← 2018 ·	Open Sud de France	· 2020 →

Ken and Neal Skupski were the defending champions, but lost in the quarterfinals to Benjamin Bonzi and Antoine Hoang.

Ivan Dodig and Édouard Roger-Vasselin won the title, defeating Bonzi and Hoang in the final, 6–4, 6–3.

== Seeds ==
1. (Croatia) Ivan Dodig / (France) Édouard Roger-Vasselin (champions)
2. (United States) Austin Krajicek / (New Zealand) Artem Sitak (first round)
3. (United Kingdom) Ken Skupski / (United Kingdom) Neal Skupski (quarterfinals)
4. (Moldova) Radu Albot / (Spain) Marcel Granollers (quarterfinals)

== Draw ==
=== Key ===
- Q = Qualifier
- WC = Wild card
- LL = Lucky loser
- Alt = Alternate
- SE = Special exempt
- PR = Protected ranking
- ITF = ITF entry
- JE = Junior exempt
- w/o = Walkover
- r = Retired
- d = Defaulted
- SR = Special ranking

=== Draw ===
First round
1	(Croatia) I Dodig (France) É Roger-Vasselin	6	7
(United States) D Kudla (Germany) A Mies	1	5
(Poland) M Matkowski (Austria) P Oswald	2	6	[10]
PR	(Belgium) S Darcis (Belgium) D Goffin	6	1	[2]
4	(Moldova) R Albot (Spain) M Granollers	6	7^{7}
(France) U Humbert (France) N Mahut	4	6^{3}
(India) L Paes (France) B Paire	6	6
(France) J Eysseric (France) G Simon	4	2
WC	(France) C Lestienne (France) L Pouille	4	3
WC	(France) B Bonzi (France) A Hoang	6	6
(Sweden) R Lindstedt (Germany) T Pütz	3	4
3	(United Kingdom) K Skupski (United Kingdom) N Skupski	6	6
(France) H Nys (Canada) D Shapovalov	6	6^{5}	[10]
(France) J Chardy (France) F Martin	4	7^{7}	[7]
(United Kingdom) L Bambridge (United Kingdom) J O'Mara	6	6
2	(United States) A Krajicek (New Zealand) A Sitak	4	2

Quarterfinals
1	(Croatia) I Dodig (France) É Roger-Vasselin	6^{6}	6	[10]
(Poland) M Matkowski (Austria) P Oswald	7^{8}	1	[7]
4	(Moldova) R Albot (Spain) M Granollers	1	4
(India) L Paes (France) B Paire	6	6
WC	(France) B Bonzi (France) A Hoang	6	7
3	(United Kingdom) K Skupski (United Kingdom) N Skupski	2	5
(France) H Nys (Canada) D Shapovalov	6	5	[8]
(United Kingdom) L Bambridge (United Kingdom) J O'Mara	3	7	[10]

Semifinals
1	(Croatia) I Dodig (France) É Roger-Vasselin	6	7^{7}
(India) L Paes (France) B Paire	3	6^{3}
WC	(France) B Bonzi (France) A Hoang	6	6
(United Kingdom) L Bambridge (United Kingdom) J O'Mara	4	4

Final
1	(Croatia) I Dodig (France) É Roger-Vasselin	6	6
WC	(France) B Bonzi (France) A Hoang	4	3
