= Jo-Wilfried Tsonga career statistics =

Career finals
Discipline	Type	Won	Lost	Total
Singles	Grand Slam	–	1	1
Singles	ATP Finals	–	1	1
Singles	ATP 1000*	2	2	4
Singles	ATP 500	2	4	6
Singles	ATP 250	14	4	18
Singles	Olympics	–	–	–
Singles	Total	18	12	30
Doubles	Grand Slam	–	–	–
Doubles	ATP Finals	–	–	–
Doubles	ATP 1000	1	–	1
Doubles	ATP 500	–	–	–
Doubles	ATP 250	3	3	6
Doubles	Olympics	–	1	1
Doubles	Total	4	4	8
* formerly known as "Super 9" (1996–1999), "Tennis Masters Series" (2000–2003) or "ATP Masters Series" (2004–2008).

This is a list of the main career statistics of French former professional tennis player, Jo-Wilfried Tsonga. Tsonga has won 18 ATP titles in singles, including 2 Masters titles at the 2008 Paris Masters and the 2014 Canada Masters. He was also the runner-up at the 2008 Australian Open and 2011 ATP World Tour Finals in singles. In addition, he was a silver medalist in men's doubles with Michaël Llodra at the 2012 London Olympics. He achieved a career-high singles ranking of world No. 5 in February 2012, and was the first player to defeat each member of the "Big Four" at Grand Slam tournaments. He also made semifinal appearances at the 2010 Australian Open, 2011 and 2012 Wimbledon Championships, along with 2013 and 2015 French Open.

== Career achievements ==
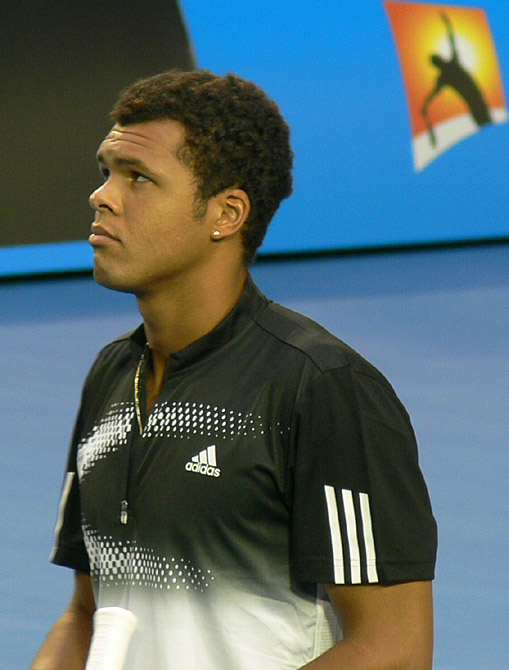
Tsonga during the 2008 Australian Open, where he achieved his best grand slam result.

Tsonga reached his first career singles final and first Grand Slam singles final at the 2008 Australian Open. In the first round, Tsonga upset 9th seed Andy Murray in four sets and eventually reached the final after upsetting then world No. 2 Rafael Nadal in straight sets in the semifinals. In the final, Tsonga lost to the world No. 3 Novak Djokovic in four sets, after winning the first set, which was the only set which Djokovic dropped during the entire tournament. Following the event, Tsonga entered the Top 20 of the ATP rankings for the first time in his career, rising to world No. 18. In September of the same year, Tsonga avenged his Australian Open loss to Djokovic by defeating the Serb in the final of the PTT Thailand Open to win his first career singles title. Two months later, Tsonga defeated David Nalbandian in the final of the BNP Paribas Masters in Paris to win his first ATP Masters Series (later ATP World Tour Masters 1000) singles title, along with 3 Top 10 wins en route to the title, including a third round victory over Djokovic. Tsonga thus became the first home player to win it since Sébastien Grosjean in 2001 and remains the last home player to win it to date. Though he only played in a few tournaments, Tsonga's results throughout the year allowed him to qualify for the year-end ATP World Tour Finals for the first time in his career. However, he lost in the round robin stage after winning one of his three matches, which was his 3rd victory of the year against Djokovic. Tsonga finished the year at a then career-high singles ranking of world No. 6.

Since 2009, the highlights of Tsonga's career have been runner-up appearances at the 2011 BNP Paribas Masters and 2011 ATP World Tour Finals and semifinal appearances at the 2010 Australian Open, 2011 and 2012 Wimbledon Championships, along with 2013 and 2015 French Open.

In July 2011, Tsonga became the first player to have defeated each member of the "Big Four" at Grand Slam tournaments, after defeating Roger Federer at the 2011 Wimbledon Championships from 2 sets down. This feat was not repeated until 4 years later. He defeated Andy Murray and Rafael Nadal at the 2008 Australian Open, Novak Djokovic at the 2010 Australian Open and Roger Federer at the 2011 Wimbledon Championships and later, at the 2013 French Open.

In February 2012, Tsonga achieved a new career high singles ranking of world No. 5.

In August 2014, Tsonga won another Masters title in Toronto, becoming the first French player to win the title. He also became the 2nd player ever to defeat 3 members of the Big Four in the same tournament: reigning world No. 1 Djokovic in the third round, Murray in the quarterfinals, and Federer in the final.

== Performance timelines ==
Key
W	F	SF	QF	#R	RR	Q#	P#	DNQ	A	Z#	PO	G	S	B	NMS	NTI	P	NH

(W) winner; (F) finalist; (SF) semifinalist; (QF) quarterfinalist; (#R) rounds 4, 3, 2, 1; (RR) round-robin stage; (Q#) qualification round; (P#) preliminary round; (DNQ) did not qualify; (A) absent; (Z#) Davis/Fed Cup Zonal Group (with number indication) or (PO) play-off; (G) gold, (S) silver or (B) bronze Olympic/Paralympic medal; (NMS) not a Masters tournament; (NTI) not a Tier I tournament; (P) postponed; (NH) not held; (SR) strike rate (events won / competed); (W–L) win–loss record.
To avoid confusion and double counting, these charts are updated at the conclusion of a tournament or when the player's participation has ended.

=== Singles ===
Tournament	2003	2004	2005	2006	2007	2008	2009	2010	2011	2012	2013	2014	2015	2016	2017	2018	2019	2020	2021	2022	SR	W–L	Win%
Grand Slam Tournaments
Australian Open	A	A	A	A	1R	F	QF	SF	3R	4R	QF	4R	A	4R	QF	3R	2R	1R	A	A	0 / 13	37–13	74%
French Open	Q2	Q2	1R	A	A	A	4R	4R	3R	QF	SF	4R	SF	3R	1R	A	2R	A	1R	1R	0 / 13	28–13	68%
Wimbledon	A	A	A	A	4R	A	3R	QF	SF	SF	2R	4R	3R	QF	3R	A	3R	NH	1R	A	0 / 12	32–12	73%
US Open	A	Q2	A	A	3R	3R	4R	A	QF	2R	A	4R	QF	QF	2R	A	1R	A	A	A	0 / 10	24–10	71%
Win–loss	0–0	0–0	0–1	0–0	5–3	8–2	12–4	12–3	13–4	13–4	10–3	12–4	11–3	13–4	7–4	2–1	4–4	0–1	0–2	0–0	0 / 47	121–47	72%
Year-end championship
Tour Finals	did not qualify					RR	DNQ		F	RR	did not qualify										0 / 3	4–7	36%
National representation
Summer Olympics	NH	A	not held			A	not held			QF	not held			2R	not held				A	NH	0 / 2	4–2	67%
Davis Cup	A	A	A	A	A	QF	1R	F	SF	QF	QF	F	QF	SF	W	F	RR	NH	A	A	1 / 11	22–10	70%
ATP World Tour Masters 1000
Indian Wells Masters	A	A	Q1	A	A	4R	3R	4R	2R	4R	QF	2R	A	QF	2R	A	A	NH	A	A	0 / 9	13–9	59%
Miami Open	A	A	Q1	A	A	3R	QF	QF	3R	QF	4R	4R	3R	3R	A	A	Q2	NH	A	1R	0 / 10	17–10	65%
Monte-Carlo Masters	A	A	A	A	A	A	A	3R	2R	QF	SF	QF	3R	SF	2R	A	1R	NH	A	1R	0 / 10	14–10	58%
Madrid Open (Note: Held as Hamburg Masters (outdoor clay) until 2008, Madrid Masters (outdoor clay) 2009 – present.)	A	A	A	A	A	2R	2R	2R	3R	3R	QF	2R	3R	3R	2R	A	A	NH	A	A	0 / 10	11–9	55%
Italian Open	A	A	A	A	A	1R	1R	QF	2R	QF	2R	3R	2R	A	A	A	1R	A	A	A	0 / 9	8–9	47%
Canadian Open	A	A	A	A	A	A	SF	A	SF	2R	A	W	QF	A	2R	A	1R	NH	A	A	1 / 7	16–6	73%
Cincinnati Masters	A	A	A	A	A	A	2R	A	2R	A	A	1R	1R	3R	2R	A	A	A	A	A	0 / 6	2–6	25%
Shanghai Masters (Note: Held as Madrid Masters (indoor hard) from 2002 to 2008, and Shanghai Masters (outdoor hard) 2009 – present.)	A	A	A	A	A	3R	3R	QF	2R	QF	SF	A	F	QF	A	A	A	NH		A	0 / 8	18–8	69%
Paris Masters	A	2R	A	Q2	2R	W	QF	A	F	QF	2R	3R	3R	QF	2R	1R	QF	A	A	A	1 / 13	21–12	64%
Win–loss	0–0	1–1	0–0	0–0	1–1	10–5	11–8	11–6	13–9	14–8	13–7	14–7	15–8	14–7	1–5	0–1	3–4	0–0	0–0	0–2	2 / 81	121–79	61%
Career statistics
	2003	2004	2005	2006	2007	2008	2009	2010	2011	2012	2013	2014	2015	2016	2017	2018	2019	2020	2021	2022	SR	W–L	Win %
Tournaments	0	2	1	0	10	16	23	15	24	24	17	18	16	16	19	6	20	2	8	7	244		
Finals	0	0	0	0	0	3	3	0	6	4	2	2	2	1	5	0	2	0	0	0	30		
Titles	0	0	0	0	0	2	3	0	2	2	1	1	1	0	4	0	2	0	0	0	18		
Hard win–loss	0–0	1–1	0–0	0–0	6–7	27–11	41–14	19–10	38–15	36–16	23–10	22–12	20–9	25–11	27–10	5–7	24–12	0–2	1–3	2–4	17 / 162	317–153	67%
Clay win–loss	0–0	0–0	0–1	0–0	0–0	4–2	8–4	8–5	7–6	10–6	12–4	10–5	10–5	8–5	7–2	0–0	6–5	0–0	0–3	0–3	1 / 55	90–57	61%
Grass win–loss	0–0	0–0	0–0	0–0	5–2	0–0	2–2	4–1	10–3	9–3	4–2	4–2	2–2	4–1	3–2	0–0	4–3	0–0	0–2	0–0	0 / 24	51–25	68%
Carpet win–loss	0–0	1–1	0–0	0–0	3–1	3–1	2–0	Discontinued													0 / 3	9–3	75%
Overall win–loss	0–0	2–2	0–1	0–0	14–10	34–14	53–20	31–16	55–24	55–25	39–16	36–19	32–16	37–17	38–15	5–7	34–20	0–2	1–8	2–7	18 / 244	467–238	66%
Win %	–	50%	0%	–	58%	71%	73%	66%	70%	69%	71%	65%	67%	69%	73%	42%	63%	0%	11%	29%	66.24%		
Year-end ranking	394	163	338	212	43	6	10	13	6	8	10	12	10	12	15	239	29	62	257		$22,458,018		

== Significant finals ==
=== Grand Slam tournaments ===
==== Singles: 1 (1 runner-up) ====
Result	Year	Tournament	Surface	Opponent	Score
Loss	2008	Australian Open	Hard	(Serbia) Novak Djokovic	6–4, 4–6, 3–6, 6–7^{(2–7)}

=== Year-end championships ===
==== Singles: 1 (1 runner-up) ====
Result	Year	Tournament	Surface	Opponent	Score
Loss	2011	ATP Tour finals, London	Hard (i)	(Switzerland) Roger Federer	3–6, 7–6^{(8–6)}, 3–6

=== Masters 1000 tournaments ===
==== Singles: 4 (2 titles, 2 runner-ups) ====
Result	Year	Tournament	Surface	Opponent	Score
Win	2008	Paris Masters	Hard (i)	(Argentina) David Nalbandian	6–3, 4–6, 6–4
Loss	2011	Paris Masters	Hard (i)	(Switzerland) Roger Federer	1–6, 6–7^{(3–7)}
Win	2014	Canadian Open	Hard	(Switzerland) Roger Federer	7–5, 7–6^{(7–3)}
Loss	2015	Shanghai Masters	Hard	(Serbia) Novak Djokovic	2–6, 4–6

==== Doubles: 1 (1 title) ====
Result	Year	Tournament	Surface	Partner	Opponents	Score
Win	2009	Shanghai Masters	Hard	(France) Julien Benneteau	(Poland) Mariusz Fyrstenberg (Poland) Marcin Matkowski	6–2, 6–4

=== Olympic medal matches ===
==== Doubles: 1 (1 silver medal) ====
Result	Year	Tournament	Surface	Partner	Opponents	Score
Silver	2012	Summer Olympics London	Grass	(France) Michaël Llodra	(United States) Bob Bryan (United States) Mike Bryan	4–6, 6–7^{(2–7)}

== ATP Tour finals ==
=== Singles: 30 (18 titles, 12 runner-ups) ===
Legend Grand Slam tournaments (0–1) ATP World Tour Finals (0–1) ATP World Tour Masters 1000 (2–2) ATP World Tour 500 Series (2–4) ATP World Tour 250 Series (14–4)	Titles by surface Hard (17–11) Clay (1–0) Grass (0–1) Carpet (0–0)	Titles by setting Outdoors (5–4) Indoors (13–8)

Result	W–L	Date	Tournament	Tier	Surface	Opponent	Score
Loss	0–1	Jan 2008	Australian Open, Australia	Grand Slam	Hard	(Serbia) Novak Djokovic	6–4, 4–6, 3–6, 6–7^{(2–7)}
Win	1–1	Sep 2008	Thailand Open, Thailand	International	Hard (i)	(Serbia) Novak Djokovic	7–6^{(7–4)}, 6–4
Win	2–1	Nov 2008	Paris Masters, France	Masters 1000	Hard (i)	(Argentina) David Nalbandian	6–3, 4–6, 6–4
Win	3–1	Feb 2009	SA Tennis Open, South Africa	250 Series	Hard	(France) Jérémy Chardy	6–4, 7–6^{(7–5)}
Win	4–1	Feb 2009	Open 13, France	250 Series	Hard (i)	(France) Michaël Llodra	7–5, 7–6^{(7–3)}
Win	5–1	Oct 2009	Japan Open, Japan	500 Series	Hard	(Russia) Mikhail Youzhny	6–3, 6–3
Loss	5–2	Feb 2011	Rotterdam Open, Netherlands	500 Series	Hard (i)	(Sweden) Robin Söderling	3–6, 6–3, 3–6
Loss	5–3	Jun 2011	Queen's Club Championships, United Kingdom	250 Series	Grass	(United Kingdom) Andy Murray	6–3, 6–7^{(2–7)}, 4–6
Win	6–3	Sep 2011	Moselle Open, France	250 Series	Hard (i)	(Croatia) Ivan Ljubičić	6–3, 6–7^{(4–7)}, 6–3
Win	7–3	Oct 2011	Vienna Open, Austria	250 Series	Hard (i)	(Argentina) Juan Martín del Potro	6–7^{(5–7)}, 6–3, 6–4
Loss	7–4	Nov 2011	Paris Masters, France	Masters 1000	Hard (i)	(Switzerland) Roger Federer	1–6, 6–7^{(3–7)}
Loss	7–5	Nov 2011	ATP Finals London, United Kingdom	ATP Finals	Hard (i)	(Switzerland) Roger Federer	3–6, 7–6^{(8–6)}, 3–6
Win	8–5	Jan 2012	Qatar Open, Qatar	250 Series	Hard	(France) Gaël Monfils	7–5, 6–3
Win	9–5	Sep 2012	Moselle Open, France (2)	250 Series	Hard (i)	(Italy) Andreas Seppi	6–1, 6–2
Loss	9–6	Oct 2012	China Open, China	500 Series	Hard	(Serbia) Novak Djokovic	6–7^{(5–7)}, 2–6
Loss	9–7	Oct 2012	Stockholm Open, Sweden	250 Series	Hard (i)	(Czech Republic) Tomáš Berdych	6–4, 4–6, 4–6
Win	10–7	Feb 2013	Open 13, France (2)	250 Series	Hard (i)	(Czech Republic) Tomáš Berdych	3–6, 7–6^{(8–6)}, 6–4
Loss	10–8	Feb 2013	Moselle Open, France	250 Series	Hard (i)	(France) Gilles Simon	4–6, 3–6
Loss	10–9	Feb 2014	Open 13, France	250 Series	Hard (i)	(Latvia) Ernests Gulbis	6–7^{(5–7)}, 4–6
Win	11–9	Aug 2014	Canadian Open, Canada	Masters 1000	Hard	(Switzerland) Roger Federer	7–5, 7–6^{(7–3)}
Win	12–9	Sep 2015	Moselle Open, France (3)	250 Series	Hard (i)	(France) Gilles Simon	7–6^{(7–5)}, 1–6, 6–2
Loss	12–10	Oct 2015	Shanghai Masters, China	Masters 1000	Hard	(Serbia) Novak Djokovic	2–6, 4–6
Loss	12–11	Oct 2016	Vienna Open, Austria	500 Series	Hard (i)	(United Kingdom) Andy Murray	3–6, 6–7^{(6–8)}
Win	13–11	Feb 2017	Rotterdam Open, Netherlands	500 Series	Hard (i)	(Belgium) David Goffin	4–6, 6–4, 6–1
Win	14–11	Feb 2017	Open 13, France (3)	250 Series	Hard (i)	(France) Lucas Pouille	6–4, 6–4
Win	15–11	May 2017	Lyon Open, France	250 Series	Clay	(Czech Republic) Tomáš Berdych	7–6^{(7–2)}, 7–5
Win	16–11	Oct 2017	European Open, Belgium	250 Series	Hard (i)	(Argentina) Diego Schwartzman	6–3, 7–5
Loss	16–12	Oct 2017	Vienna Open, Austria	500 Series	Hard (i)	(France) Lucas Pouille	1–6, 4–6
Win	17–12	Feb 2019	Open Sud de France, France	250 Series	Hard (i)	(France) Pierre-Hugues Herbert	6–4, 6–2
Win	18–12	Sep 2019	Moselle Open, France (4)	250 Series	Hard (i)	(Slovenia) Aljaž Bedene	6–7^{(4–7)}, 7–6^{(7–4)}, 6–3

=== Doubles: 8 (4 titles, 4 runner-ups) ===
Legend Grand Slam tournaments (0–0) ATP World Tour Finals (0–0) ATP World Tour Masters 1000 (1–0) Olympic Games (0–1) ATP World Tour 500 Series (0–0) ATP World Tour 250 Series (3–3)	Titles by surface Hard (3–3) Clay (0–0) Grass (0–1) Carpet (1–0)	Titles by setting Outdoors (3–1) Indoors (1–3)

Result	W–L	Date	Tournament	Tier	Surface	Partner	Opponents	Score
Win	1–0	Oct 2007	Lyon Open, France	International	Carpet (i)	(France) Sébastien Grosjean	(Poland) Łukasz Kubot (Croatia) Lovro Zovko	6–4, 6–3
Win	2–0	Jan 2008	Sydney International, Australia	International	Hard	(France) Richard Gasquet	(United States) Bob Bryan (United States) Mike Bryan	4–6, 6–4, [11–9]
Win	3–0	Jan 2009	Brisbane International, Australia	250 Series	Hard	(France) Marc Gicquel	(Spain) Fernando Verdasco (Germany) Mischa Zverev	6–4, 6–3
Win	4–0	Oct 2009	Shanghai Masters, China	Masters 1000	Hard	(France) Julien Benneteau	(Poland) Mariusz Fyrstenberg (Poland) Marcin Matkowski	6–2, 6–4
Loss	4–1	Feb 2011	Open 13, France	250 Series	Hard (i)	(France) Julien Benneteau	(Netherlands) Robin Haase (United Kingdom) Ken Skupski	3–6, 7–6^{(7–4)}, [11–13]
Loss	4–2	Feb 2012	Open 13, France (2)	250 Series	Hard (i)	(Germany) Dustin Brown	(France) Nicolas Mahut (France) Édouard Roger-Vasselin	6–3, 3–6, [6–10]
Loss	4–3	Aug 2012	Summer Olympics London, United Kingdom	Olympics	Grass	(France) Michaël Llodra	(United States) Bob Bryan (United States) Mike Bryan	4–6, 6–7^{(2–7)}
Loss	4–4	Sep 2013	Moselle Open, France	250 Series	Hard (i)	(France) Nicolas Mahut	(Sweden) Johan Brunström (South Africa) Raven Klaasen	4–6, 6–7^{(5–7)}

== ATP Challenger and ITF Futures finals ==
=== Singles: 18 (15 titles, 3 runner-ups) ===
Legend ATP Challenger Tour (9–1) ITF Futures Tour (6–2)	Finals by surface Hard (12–3) Grass (2–0) Carpet (1–0)

Result	W–L	Date	Tournament	Tier	Surface	Opponent	Score
Win	1–0	Jul 2004	Nottingham, UK	Challenger	Grass	(United Kingdom) Alex Bogdanovic	6–3, 6–4
Win	2–0	Jul 2004	Tolyatti, Russia	Challenger	Hard	(Slovakia) Ladislav Švarc	6–3, 7–6^{(7–2)}
Win	3–0	Apr 2005	León, Mexico	Challenger	Hard	(United States) Glenn Weiner	7–5, 7–5
Loss	3–1	Apr 2006	Lanzarote, Spain	Challenger	Hard	(Sweden) Filip Prpic	6–3, 3–6, 4–6
Win	4–1	Oct 2006	Rennes, France	Challenger	Carpet (i)	(Germany) Tobias Summerer	1–6, 7–5, 7–5
Win	5–1	Apr 2007	Tallahassee, US	Challenger	Hard	(South Africa) Rik de Voest	6–1, 6–4
Win	6–1	Apr 2007	Mexico City, Mexico	Challenger	Hard	(Mexico) Bruno Echagaray	6–4, 2–6, 6–1
Win	7–1	May 2007	Lanzarote, Spain	Challenger	Hard	(Australia) Paul Baccanello	6–2, 6–2
Win	8–1	Jun 2007	Surbiton, UK	Challenger	Grass	(Croatia) Ivo Karlović	6–3, 7–6^{(7–4)}
Win	9–1	Sep 2019	Cassis, France	Challenger	Hard	(Israel) Dudi Sela	6–1, 6–0
Loss	0–1	Jul 2003	France F14, Valescure	Futures	Hard	(France) Benjamin Cassaigne	5–7, 1–6
Win	1–1	Jun 2004	Spain F11, Lanzarote	Futures	Hard	(Spain) Daniel Muñoz de la Nava	7–5, 6–3
Win	2–1	Oct 2005	France F17, Saint-Dizier	Futures	Hard	(Germany) Torsten Popp	6–0, 7–6^{(10–8)}
Win	3–1	Mar 2006	France F4, Lille	Futures	Hard	(France) Sébastien de Chaunac	7–5, 7–5
Win	4–1	Apr 2006	Great Britain F5, Bath	Futures	Hard	(Sweden) Michael Ryderstedt	6–3, 6–2
Win	5–1	Apr 2006	Great Britain F6, Bath	Futures	Hard	(Sweden) Filip Prpic	6–3, 6–1
Loss	5–2	Sep 2006	France F14, Plaisir	Futures	Hard	(France) Grégory Carraz	6–7^{(7–9)}, 1–6
Win	6–2	Mar 2007	France F5, Poitiers	Futures	Hard	(Latvia) Andis Juška	6–1, 7–5

=== Doubles: 2 (1 title, 1 runner-up) ===
Legend ITF Futures Tour (1–1)	Finals by surface Clay (1–1)

Result	W–L	Date	Tournament	Tier	Surface	Partner	Opponents	Score
Loss	0–1	Apr 2003	Germany F1, Riemerling	Futures	Clay	(France) Édouard Roger-Vasselin	(Sweden) Robert Lindstedt (Sweden) Fredrik Lovén	4–6, 1–6
Win	1–1	Apr 2004	France F7, Grasse	Futures	Clay	(France) Gilles Simon	(France) Gaël Monfils (France) Josselin Ouanna	7–5, 6–2

== Top 10 wins per season ==
- Tsonga has a 45–88 (33.8%) record against players who were, at the time the match was played, ranked in the top 10.

Year	2004	2005	2006	2007	2008	2009	2010	2011	2012	2013	2014	2015	2016	2017	2018	2019	2020	2021	2022	Total
Wins	1	0	0	0	8	5	1	10	1	3	4	5	3	2	0	2	0	0	0	45

#	Player	Rank	Event	Surface	Rd	Score
2004
1.	(Spain) Carlos Moyá	6	Beijing, China	Hard	1R	6–3, 6–3
2008
2.	(United Kingdom) Andy Murray	9	Australian Open, Melbourne, Australia	Hard	1R	7–5, 6–4, 0–6, 7–6^{(7–5)}
3.	(France) Richard Gasquet	8	Australian Open, Melbourne, Australia	Hard	4R	6–2, 6–7^{(5–7)}, 7–6^{(8–6)}, 6–3
4.	(Spain) Rafael Nadal	2	Australian Open, Melbourne, Australia	Hard	SF	6–2, 6–3, 6–2
5.	(Serbia) Novak Djokovic	3	Bangkok, Thailand	Hard (i)	F	7–6^{(7–4)}, 6–4
6.	(Serbia) Novak Djokovic	3	Paris, France	Hard (i)	3R	6–4, 1–6, 6–3
7.	(United States) Andy Roddick	7	Paris, France	Hard (i)	QF	5–7, 6–4, 7–6^{(7–5)}
8.	(Argentina) David Nalbandian	8	Paris, France	Hard (i)	F	6–3, 4–6, 6–4
9.	(Serbia) Novak Djokovic	3	Tennis Masters Cup, Shanghai, China	Hard (i)	RR	1–6, 7–5, 6–1
2009
10.	(United States) James Blake	10	Australian Open, Melbourne, Australia	Hard	4R	6–4, 6–4, 7–6^{(7–3)}
11.	(Serbia) Novak Djokovic	3	Marseille, France	Hard (i)	SF	6–4, 7–6^{(7–1)}
12.	(France) Gilles Simon	8	Miami, US	Hard	4R	6–7^{(4–7)}, 6–3, 6–2
13.	(France) Gilles Simon	9	Montréal, Canada	Hard	3R	6–3, 6–3
14.	(Switzerland) Roger Federer	1	Montréal, Canada	Hard	QF	7–6^{(7–5)}, 1–6, 7–6^{(7–3)}
2010
15.	(Serbia) Novak Djokovic	3	Australian Open, Melbourne, Australia	Hard	QF	7–6^{(10–8)}, 6–7^{(5–7)}, 1–6, 6–3, 6–1
2011
16.	(Spain) Nicolás Almagro	9	Madrid, Spain	Clay	1R	6–1, 6–3
17.	(Spain) Rafael Nadal	1	London, UK	Grass	QF	6–7^{(3–7)}, 6–4, 6–1
18.	(Spain) David Ferrer	6	Wimbledon, London, UK	Grass	4R	6–3, 6–4, 7–6^{(7–1)}
19.	(Switzerland) Roger Federer	3	Wimbledon, London, UK	Grass	QF	3–6, 6–7^{(3–7)}, 6–4, 6–4, 6–4
20.	(Switzerland) Roger Federer	3	Montréal, Canada	Hard	3R	7–6^{(7–3)}, 4–6, 6–1
21.	(Spain) Nicolás Almagro	10	Montréal, Canada	Hard	QF	6–4, 6–4
22.	(United States) Mardy Fish	8	US Open, New York, US	Hard	4R	6–4, 6–7^{(5–7)}, 3–6, 6–4, 6–2
23.	(United States) Mardy Fish	8	ATP World Tour Finals, London, UK	Hard (i)	RR	7–6^{(7–4)}, 6–1
24.	(Spain) Rafael Nadal	2	ATP World Tour Finals, London, UK	Hard (i)	RR	7–6^{(7–2)}, 4–6, 6–3
25.	(Czech Republic) Tomáš Berdych	7	ATP World Tour Finals, London, UK	Hard (i)	SF	6–3, 7–5
2012
26.	(Argentina) Juan Martín del Potro	9	Rome, Italy	Clay	3R	6–4, 6–1
2013
27.	(France) Richard Gasquet	10	Australian Open, Melbourne, Australia	Hard	4R	6–4, 3–6, 6–3, 6–2
28.	(Czech Republic) Tomáš Berdych	6	Marseille, France	Hard (i)	F	3–6, 7–6^{(8–6)}, 6–4
29.	(Switzerland) Roger Federer	3	French Open, Paris, France	Clay	QF	7–5, 6–3, 6–3
2014
30.	(Serbia) Novak Djokovic	1	Toronto, Canada	Hard	3R	6–2, 6–2
31.	(United Kingdom) Andy Murray	9	Toronto, Canada	Hard	QF	7–6^{(7–5)}, 4–6, 6–4
32.	(Bulgaria) Grigor Dimitrov	8	Toronto, Canada	Hard	SF	6–4, 6–3
33.	(Switzerland) Roger Federer	3	Toronto, Canada	Hard	F	7–5, 7–6^{(7–3)}
2015
34.	(Czech Republic) Tomáš Berdych	4	French Open, Paris, France	Clay	4R	6–3, 6–2, 6–7^{(5–7)}, 6–3
35.	(Japan) Kei Nishikori	5	French Open, Paris, France	Clay	QF	6–1, 6–4, 4–6, 3–6, 6–3
36.	(France) Gilles Simon	10	Metz, France	Hard (i)	F	7–6^{(7–5)}, 1–6, 6–2
37.	(South Africa) Kevin Anderson	10	Shanghai, China	Hard	QF	7–6^{(8–6)}, 5–7, 6–4
38.	(Spain) Rafael Nadal	7	Shanghai, China	Hard	SF	6–4, 0–6, 7–5
2016
39.	(Switzerland) Roger Federer	3	Monte Carlo, Monaco	Clay	QF	3–6, 6–2, 7–5
40.	(France) Richard Gasquet	10	Wimbledon, London, UK	Grass	4R	4–2 ret.
41.	(Japan) Kei Nishikori	4	Paris, France	Hard (i)	3R	0–6, 6–3, 7–6^{(7–3)}
2017
42.	(Croatia) Marin Čilić	7	Rotterdam, Netherlands	Hard (i)	QF	7–6^{(10–8)}, 7–6^{(7–5)}
43.	(Germany) Alexander Zverev	5	Vienna, Austria	Hard (i)	QF	7–6^{(8–6)}, 6–2
2019
44.	(Russia) Karen Khachanov	8	Washington, US	Hard	2R	6–4, 2–6, 7–5
45.	(Italy) Matteo Berrettini	9	Paris, France	Hard (i)	2R	6–4, 6–3

== National representation ==
=== Team competitions finals: 6 (2 titles, 4 runner-ups) ===
Legend
Olympic Games (0–1)
Davis Cup (1–3)
Hopman Cup (1–0)

Outcome	Date	Team competition	Surface	Partner/team	Opponents	Score
Loss	3–5 December 2010	Davis Cup, Belgrade, Serbia	Hard (i)	(France) Gaël Monfils (France) Gilles Simon (France) Michaël Llodra (France) Arnaud Clément (France) Julien Benneteau	(Serbia) Novak Djokovic (Serbia) Viktor Troicki (Serbia) Janko Tipsarević (Serbia) Nenad Zimonjić	2–3
Loss	4 August 2012	Summer Olympics, London, United Kingdom	Grass	(France) Michaël Llodra	(United States) Bob Bryan (United States) Mike Bryan	0–1
Win	4 January 2014	Hopman Cup, Perth, Australia	Hard	(France) Alizé Cornet	(Poland) Agnieszka Radwańska (Poland) Grzegorz Panfil	2–1
Loss	21–23 November 2014	Davis Cup, Lille, France	Clay (i)	(France) Gaël Monfils (France) Richard Gasquet (France) Julien Benneteau (France) Michaël Llodra	(Switzerland) Roger Federer (Switzerland) Stan Wawrinka (Switzerland) Marco Chiudinelli (Switzerland) Michael Lammer	1–3
Win	24–26 November 2017	Davis Cup, Villeneuve-d'Ascq, France	Hard (i)	(France) Lucas Pouille (France) Richard Gasquet (France) Pierre-Hugues Herbert (France) Nicolas Mahut (France) Julien Benneteau (France) Jérémy Chardy (France) Gilles Simon	(Belgium) David Goffin (Belgium) Steve Darcis (Belgium) Ruben Bemelmans (Belgium) Joris De Loore (Belgium) Arthur De Greef	3–2
Loss	23–25 November 2018	Davis Cup, Lille, France	Clay (i)	(France) Lucas Pouille (France) Jérémy Chardy (France) Nicolas Mahut (France) Pierre-Hugues Herbert (France) Richard Gasquet (France) Benoît Paire (France) Julien Benneteau (France) Adrian Mannarino	(Croatia) Marin Čilić (Croatia) Borna Ćorić (Croatia) Mate Pavić (Croatia) Ivan Dodig (Croatia) Nikola Mektić (Croatia) Viktor Galović	1–3

== ATP Tour career earnings ==
Year	Majors	ATP wins	Total wins	Earnings ($)	Money list rank
2001	0	0	0	$896
2002	0	0	0	$8,088
2003	0	0	0	$15,703	431
2004	0	0	0	$53,277	259
2005	0	0	0	$28,134	338
2006	0	0	0	$21,760	394
2007	0	0	0	$318,615	84
2008	0	2	2	$1,695,139	6
2009	0	3	3	$1,818,551	10
2010	0	0	0	$1,166,154	16
2011	0	2	2	$3,173,972	5
2012	0	2	2	$2,376,642	8
2013	0	1	1	$1,833,946	11
2014	0	1	1	$1,961,908	12
2015	0	1	1	$2,213,691
2016	0	0	0	$2,265,379
2017	0	4	4	$1,822,983
2018	0	0	0	$184,312
2019	0	2	2	$910,680	63
2020	0	0	0	$85,047	237
2021	0	0	0	$52,413	219
Career	0	18	18	$22,210,076	17

* Statistics correct as of 13 June 2021.
