= 2019 Open Sud de France – Singles =

Singles
- 2019 Open Sud de France

Final
- Champion: (France) Jo-Wilfried Tsonga
- Runner-up: (France) Pierre-Hugues Herbert
- Score: 6–4, 6–2

Details
- Draw: 28 (4 Q / 3 WC )
- Seeds: 8

Events
Singles	Doubles
- Open Sud de France

Lucas Pouille was the defending champion, but lost in the second round to Marcos Baghdatis.

Jo-Wilfried Tsonga won the title, defeating Pierre-Hugues Herbert in the final, 6–4, 6–2.

== Seeds ==
The top four seeds received a bye into the second round.

1. (France) Lucas Pouille (second round)
2. (Belgium) David Goffin (second round)
3. (Canada) Denis Shapovalov (quarterfinals)
4. (France) Gilles Simon (second round)
5. (Germany) Philipp Kohlschreiber (first round)
6. (France) Jérémy Chardy (quarterfinals)
7. (France) Pierre-Hugues Herbert (final)
8. (France) Benoît Paire (second round)

== Draw ==
Key

- Q = Qualifier
- WC = Wild card
- LL = Lucky loser
- Alt = Alternate
- ITF = ITF entry
- PR = Protected ranking
- SR = Special ranking
- SE = Special exempt
- JE = Junior exempt
- JR = Junior Accelerator Programme entrant
- CO = College Accelerator Programme entrant
- NG = Next Gen Accelerator Program entrant
- w/o = Walkover
- r = Retired
- d = Defaulted

=== Finals ===
Semifinals
(Moldova) Radu Albot	1	3
WC	(France) Jo-Wilfried Tsonga	6	6
7	(France) Pierre-Hugues Herbert	6	7
(Czech Republic) Tomáš Berdych	2	5

Final
WC	(France) Jo-Wilfried Tsonga	6	6
7	(France) Pierre-Hugues Herbert	4	2

=== Top half ===
First round
LL	(Belgium) R Bemelmans	2	4
Q	(Cyprus) M Baghdatis	6	6
(Latvia) E Gulbis	6	7^{7}
(Poland) H Hurkacz	4	6^{5}
(Moldova) R Albot	6	6
5	(Germany) P Kohlschreiber	4	3
WC	(France) U Humbert	6	6^{5}	4
WC	(France) J-W Tsonga	3	7^{7}	6
Q	(France) A Hoang	6	6
PR	(Belgium) S Darcis	1	2
LL	(Spain) A Menéndez Maceiras	1	1
6	(France) J Chardy	6	6

Second round
1	(France) L Pouille	6^{2}	7^{7}	4
Q	(Cyprus) M Baghdatis	7^{7}	6^{3}	6
(Latvia) E Gulbis	6^{5}	6	4
(Moldova) R Albot	7^{7}	4	6
4	(France) G Simon	2	6^{3}
WC	(France) J-W Tsonga	6	7^{7}
Q	(France) A Hoang	3	5
6	(France) J Chardy	6	7

Quarterfinals
Q	(Cyprus) M Baghdatis	2	6^{2}
(Moldova) R Albot	6	7^{7}
WC	(France) J-W Tsonga	6^{6}	7^{7}	6
6	(France) J Chardy	7^{8}	6^{4}	4

Semifinals
(Moldova) R Albot	1	3
WC	(France) J-W Tsonga	6	6

=== Bottom half ===
First round
7	(France) P-H Herbert	6	6
(United States) D Kudla	2	1
(Belarus) I Ivashka	4	6	6
(Italy) T Fabbiano	6	4	3
(Spain) M Granollers	7^{7}	6^{5}	7^{7}
(Croatia) I Karlović	6^{3}	7^{7}	6^{5}
8	(France) B Paire	7	6
(Russia) E Donskoy	5	3
(Czech Republic) T Berdych	5	6	6
Q	(Germany) M Bachinger	7	3	3
(Serbia) F Krajinović	7^{9}	6
Q	(France) N Mahut	6^{7}	4

Second round
7	(France) P-H Herbert	4	6	6
(Belarus) I Ivashka	6	4	2
(Spain) M Granollers	4	6^{1}
3/WC	(Canada) D Shapovalov	6	7^{7}
8	(France) B Paire	2	0
(Czech Republic) T Berdych	6	6
(Serbia) F Krajinović	6	6
2	(Belgium) D Goffin	4	4

Quarterfinals
7	(France) P-H Herbert	7	7^{7}
3/WC	(Canada) D Shapovalov	5	6^{4}
(Czech Republic) T Berdych	7^{7}	6^{5}	7
(Serbia) F Krajinović	6^{3}	7^{7}	5

Semifinals
7	(France) P-H Herbert	6	7
(Czech Republic) T Berdych	2	5

== Qualifying ==
=== Seeds ===
1. (Lithuania) Ričardas Berankis (first round)
2. (Spain) Adrián Menéndez Maceiras (qualifying competition, lucky loser)
3. (Cyprus) Marcos Baghdatis (qualified)
4. (Belgium) Ruben Bemelmans (qualifying competition, lucky loser)
5. (France) Quentin Halys (qualifying competition)
6. (Germany) Matthias Bachinger (qualified)
7. (France) Antoine Hoang (qualified)
8. (France) Constant Lestienne (first round)

=== Qualifiers ===
1. (France) Nicolas Mahut
2. (France) Antoine Hoang
3. (Cyprus) Marcos Baghdatis
4. (Germany) Matthias Bachinger

=== Lucky losers ===
1. (Spain) Adrián Menéndez Maceiras
2. (Belgium) Ruben Bemelmans

=== Qualifying draw ===
==== First qualifier ====
First round
1	(Lithuania) Ričardas Berankis	2	3
(France) Nicolas Mahut	6	6
(Russia) Alexey Vatutin	6	3	6
8	(France) Constant Lestienne	4	6	1

Qualifying competition
(France) Nicolas Mahut	6	6
(Russia) Alexey Vatutin	4	4

==== Second qualifier ====
First round
2	(Spain) Adrián Menéndez Maceiras	7	6
Alt	(France) Benjamin Bonzi	5	3
(Spain) Sergio Gutiérrez Ferrol	2	0
7	(France) Antoine Hoang	6	6

Qualifying competition
2	(Spain) Adrián Menéndez Maceiras	5	3
7	(France) Antoine Hoang	7	6

==== Third qualifier ====
First round
3	(Cyprus) Marcos Baghdatis	3	6	6
WC	(France) Antoine Cornut-Chauvinc	6	4	4
Alt	(France) Kenny de Schepper	4	6	0
5	(France) Quentin Halys	6	3	6

Qualifying competition
3	(Cyprus) Marcos Baghdatis	6	6
5	(France) Quentin Halys	2	3

==== Fourth qualifier ====
First round
4	(Belgium) Ruben Bemelmans	7^{8}	6
(Italy) Matteo Donati	6^{6}	3
WC	(France) Jonathan Eysseric	4	1
6	(Germany) Matthias Bachinger	6	6

Qualifying competition
4	(Belgium) Ruben Bemelmans	3	4
6	(Germany) Matthias Bachinger	6	6
