= 2018 Open Sud de France – Singles =

Singles
- 2018 Open Sud de France

Final
- Champion: (France) Lucas Pouille
- Runner-up: (France) Richard Gasquet
- Score: 7–6^{(7–2)}, 6–4

Details
- Draw: 28 (4 Q / 3 WC )
- Seeds: 8

Events
Singles	Doubles
- Open Sud de France

Alexander Zverev was the defending champion, but chose not to participate this year.

Lucas Pouille won the title, defeating Richard Gasquet in the final, 7–6^{(7–2)}, 6–4.

== Seeds ==
The top four seeds receive a bye into the second round.

1. (Belgium) David Goffin (semifinals)
2. (France) Lucas Pouille (champion)
3. (France) Jo-Wilfried Tsonga (semifinals, retired)
4. (Bosnia and Herzegovina) Damir Džumhur (quarterfinals)
5. (France) Richard Gasquet (final)
6. (Russia) Andrey Rublev (quarterfinals)
7. (Spain) David Ferrer (first round)
8. (Japan) Yūichi Sugita (first round)

== Draw ==
Key

- Q = Qualifier
- WC = Wild card
- LL = Lucky loser
- Alt = Alternate
- ITF = ITF entry
- PR = Protected ranking
- SR = Special ranking
- SE = Special exempt
- JE = Junior exempt
- JR = Junior Accelerator Programme entrant
- CO = College Accelerator Programme entrant
- NG = Next Gen Accelerator Program entrant
- w/o = Walkover
- r = Retired
- d = Defaulted

=== Finals ===
Semifinals
1	(Belgium) David Goffin	4	6	3
5	(France) Richard Gasquet	6	0	6
3	(France) Jo-Wilfried Tsonga	6	5^{r}
2/WC	(France) Lucas Pouille	1	5

Final
5	(France) Richard Gasquet	6^{2}	4
2/WC	(France) Lucas Pouille	7^{7}	6

=== Top half ===
First round
(France) G Simon	6	4	7^{7}
Q	(Germany) Y Maden	1	6	6^{3}
PR	(Lithuania) R Berankis	6	7^{8}
WC	(France) J Benneteau	3	6^{6}
(Russia) K Khachanov	6^{5}	6	6
7	(Spain) D Ferrer	7^{7}	3	4
WC	(France) C Hemery	1	2
(Belgium) R Bemelmans	6	6
Q	(France) K de Schepper	6^{4}	7^{7}	4
(France) P-H Herbert	7^{7}	6^{5}	6
(Russia) D Medvedev	0	3
5	(France) R Gasquet	6	6

Second round
1	(Belgium) D Goffin	6	6
(France) G Simon	4	2
PR	(Lithuania) R Berankis	2	6^{11}
(Russia) K Khachanov	6	7^{13}
4	(Bosnia and Herzegovina) D Džumhur	7	6
(Belgium) R Bemelmans	5	4
(France) P-H Herbert	6^{3}	7	3
5	(France) R Gasquet	7^{7}	5	6

Quarterfinals
1	(Belgium) D Goffin	6	6
(Russia) K Khachanov	4	4
4	(Bosnia and Herzegovina) D Džumhur	4	2
5	(France) R Gasquet	6	6

Semifinals
1	(Belgium) D Goffin	4	6	3
5	(France) R Gasquet	6	0	6

=== Bottom half ===
First round
6	(Russia) A Rublev	6	6
(Spain) G García López	4	4
(France) J Chardy	4	7	7
(Greece) S Tsitsipas	6	5	5
(Germany) D Brown	7^{7}	5^{r}
(France) N Mahut	6^{2}	2
8	(Japan) Y Sugita	7	3	4
PR	(Australia) J Millman	5	6	6
(France) B Paire	6	6
(Germany) M Zverev	4	4
Q	(Spain) C Taberner	7^{7}	7^{7}
Q	(Slovakia) N Gombos	6^{5}	6^{1}

Second round
6	(Russia) A Rublev	6	6
(France) J Chardy	2	1
(France) N Mahut	6^{3}	7^{7}	6^{4}
3	(France) J-W Tsonga	7^{7}	6^{3}	7^{7}
PR	(Australia) J Millman	4	6^{4}
(France) B Paire	6	7^{7}
Q	(Spain) C Taberner	1	2
2/WC	(France) L Pouille	6	6

Quarterfinals
6	(Russia) A Rublev	4	6^{1}
3	(France) J-W Tsonga	6	7^{7}
(France) B Paire	1	4
2/WC	(France) L Pouille	6	6

Semifinals
3	(France) J-W Tsonga	6	5^{r}
2/WC	(France) L Pouille	1	5

== Qualifying ==
=== Seeds ===
1. (Italy) Matteo Berrettini (first round)
2. (Slovakia) Norbert Gombos (qualified)
3. (Germany) Yannick Maden (qualified)
4. (France) Kenny de Schepper (qualified)
5. (France) Gleb Sakharov (first round)
6. (Spain) Ricardo Ojeda Lara (qualifying competition)
7. (Spain) Jaume Munar (qualifying competition)
8. (Spain) Carlos Taberner (qualified)

=== Qualifiers ===
1. (Spain) Carlos Taberner
2. (Slovakia) Norbert Gombos
3. (Germany) Yannick Maden
4. (France) Kenny de Schepper

=== Qualifying draw ===
==== First qualifier ====
First round
1	(Italy) Matteo Berrettini	3	6	3
(Argentina) Marco Trungelliti	6	3	6
(France) Benjamin Bonzi	2	4
8	(Spain) Carlos Taberner	6	6

Qualifying competition
(Argentina) Marco Trungelliti	6	2	4
8	(Spain) Carlos Taberner	4	6	6

==== Second qualifier ====
First round
2	(Slovakia) Norbert Gombos	6	7^{7}
WC	(France) Tristan Lamasine	4	6^{5}
(Spain) Bernabé Zapata Miralles	6	2	4
6	(Spain) Ricardo Ojeda Lara	4	6	6

Qualifying competition
2	(Slovakia) Norbert Gombos	6	6
6	(Spain) Ricardo Ojeda Lara	2	2

==== Third qualifier ====
First round
3	(Germany) Yannick Maden	6	6
WC	(France) Elliot Benchetrit	2	0
(France) Vincent Millot	6	7^{7}
5	(France) Gleb Sakharov	3	6^{5}

Qualifying competition
3	(Germany) Yannick Maden	5	7^{7}	6
(France) Vincent Millot	7	6^{3}	1

==== Fourth qualifier ====
First round
4	(France) Kenny de Schepper	7^{7}	4	7^{8}
(Italy) Matteo Donati	6^{4}	6	6^{6}
Alt	(France) Antoine Hoang	7^{8}	3	2
7	(Spain) Jaume Munar	6^{6}	6	6

Qualifying competition
4	(France) Kenny de Schepper	6	6
7	(Spain) Jaume Munar	1	4
