= 2020 Open Sud de France – Doubles =

Doubles
- 2020 Open Sud de France

Final
- Champions: (Serbia) Nikola Ćaćić (Croatia) Mate Pavić
- Runners-up: (United Kingdom) Dominic Inglot (Pakistan) Aisam-ul-Haq Qureshi
- Score: 6–4, 6–7^{(4–7)}, [10–4]

Details
- Draw: 16
- Seeds: 4

Events
Singles	Doubles
← 2019 ·	Open Sud de France	· 2021 →

Ivan Dodig and Édouard Roger-Vasselin were the defending champions, but Dodig chose not to participate this year. Roger-Vasselin played alongside Jürgen Melzer but lost in the quarterfinals to Tomislav Brkić and Ante Pavić.

Nikola Ćaćić and Mate Pavić won the title, defeating Dominic Inglot and Aisam-ul-Haq Qureshi in the final, 6–4, 6–7^{(4–7)}, [10–4].

== Seeds ==
1. (Germany) Kevin Krawietz / (France) Nicolas Mahut (quarterfinals)
2. (Netherlands) Jean-Julien Rojer / (Romania) Horia Tecău (quarterfinals)
3. (Austria) Jürgen Melzer / (France) Édouard Roger-Vasselin (quarterfinals)
4. (United Kingdom) Jamie Murray / (United Kingdom) Neal Skupski (semifinals)

== Draw ==
=== Key ===
- Q = Qualifier
- WC = Wild card
- LL = Lucky loser
- Alt = Alternate
- SE = Special exempt
- PR = Protected ranking
- ITF = ITF entry
- JE = Junior exempt
- w/o = Walkover
- r = Retired
- d = Defaulted
- SR = Special ranking

=== Draw ===
First round
1	(Germany) K Krawietz (France) N Mahut	7^{7}	4	[10]
(France) A Mannarino (Monaco) H Nys	6^{4}	6	[4]
WC	(France) K de Schepper (France) H Gaston	4	4
(Serbia) N Ćaćić (Croatia) M Pavić	6	6
3	(Austria) J Melzer (France) É Roger-Vasselin	6	6
WC	(Spain) F López (Spain) M López	2	2
(Bosnia and Herzegovina) T Brkić (Croatia) A Pavić	6	6
(Italy) S Bolelli (Czech Republic) R Jebavý	4	4
(Spain) P Carreño Busta (Portugal) J Sousa	6^{7}	6^{8}
(Croatia) I Sabanov (Croatia) M Sabanov	7^{9}	7^{10}
Alt	(Austria) J Knowle (Austria) D Novak	1	0
4	(United Kingdom) J Murray (United Kingdom) N Skupski	6	6
(United Kingdom) D Inglot (Pakistan) A-u-H Qureshi	6^{5}	6	[12]
(Kazakhstan) A Bublik (Bosnia and Herzegovina) D Džumhur	7^{7}	4	[10]
(Canada) F Auger-Aliassime (Canada) D Shapovalov	4	4
2	(Netherlands) J-J Rojer (Romania) H Tecău	6	6

Quarterfinals
1	(Germany) K Krawietz (France) N Mahut	4	5
(Serbia) N Ćaćić (Croatia) M Pavić	6	7
3	(Austria) J Melzer (France) É Roger-Vasselin	4	6	[7]
(Bosnia and Herzegovina) T Brkić (Croatia) A Pavić	6	2	[10]
(Croatia) I Sabanov (Croatia) M Sabanov	6	2	[2]
4	(United Kingdom) J Murray (United Kingdom) N Skupski	3	6	[10]
(United Kingdom) D Inglot (Pakistan) A-u-H Qureshi	7^{7}	6^{4}	[11]
2	(Netherlands) J-J Rojer (Romania) H Tecău	6^{4}	7^{7}	[9]

Semifinals
(Serbia) N Ćaćić (Croatia) M Pavić	7^{7}	7
(Bosnia and Herzegovina) T Brkić (Croatia) A Pavić	6^{3}	5
4	(United Kingdom) J Murray (United Kingdom) N Skupski	6	6^{5}	[5]
(United Kingdom) D Inglot (Pakistan) A-u-H Qureshi	4	7^{7}	[10]

Final
(Serbia) N Ćaćić (Croatia) M Pavić	6	6^{4}	[10]
(United Kingdom) D Inglot (Pakistan) A-u-H Qureshi	4	7^{7}	[4]
