= 2017 Open Sud de France – Doubles =

Doubles
- 2017 Open Sud de France

Final
- Champions: (Germany) Alexander Zverev (Germany) Mischa Zverev
- Runners-up: (France) Fabrice Martin (Canada) Daniel Nestor
- Score: 6–4, 6–7^{(3–7)}, [10–7]

Details
- Draw: 16
- Seeds: 4

Events
Singles	Doubles
← 2016 ·	Open Sud de France	· 2018 →

Mate Pavić and Michael Venus were the defending champions, but Pavić chose to compete in Sofia instead. Venus played alongside Robert Lindstedt, but lost in the quarterfinals to Alexander and Mischa Zverev.

The Zverev brothers went on to win the title, defeating Fabrice Martin and Daniel Nestor in the final, 6–4, 6–7^{(3–7)}, [10–7].

== Seeds ==
1. (Spain) Feliciano López / (Spain) Marc López (first round)
2. (France) Fabrice Martin / (Canada) Daniel Nestor (final)
3. (Sweden) Robert Lindstedt / (New Zealand) Michael Venus (quarterfinals)
4. (New Zealand) Marcus Daniell / (Brazil) Marcelo Demoliner (semifinals)

== Draw ==
=== Key ===
- Q = Qualifier
- WC = Wild card
- LL = Lucky loser
- Alt = Alternate
- SE = Special exempt
- PR = Protected ranking
- ITF = ITF entry
- JE = Junior exempt
- w/o = Walkover
- r = Retired
- d = Defaulted
- SR = Special ranking

=== Draw ===
First round
1	(Spain) F López (Spain) M López	3	2
(Tunisia) M Jaziri (France) A Olivetti	6	6
(India) P Raja (India) D Sharan	w/o
(Germany) D Brown (Russia) K Khachanov
3	(Sweden) R Lindstedt (New Zealand) M Venus	6	7^{7}
(United Kingdom) J Marray (Canada) A Shamasdin	0	6^{5}
(France) J Benneteau (France) J Chardy	1	6	[10]
(Belarus) A Bury (Croatia) A Šančić	6	2	[7]
(France) J Eysseric (Croatia) N Mektić	6	7^{7}
Alt	(Croatia) B Ćorić (France) B Paire	3	6^{4}
WC	(France) Q Halys (France) T Lamasine	4	4
2	(France) F Martin (Canada) D Nestor	6	6

Quarterfinals
(Tunisia) M Jaziri (France) A Olivetti	4	2
(India) P Raja (India) D Sharan	6	6
3	(Sweden) R Lindstedt (New Zealand) M Venus	4	5
(Germany) A Zverev (Germany) M Zverev	6	7
(France) J Benneteau (France) J Chardy	6	4	[6]
4	(New Zealand) M Daniell (Brazil) M Demoliner	3	6	[10]
(France) J Eysseric (Croatia) N Mektić	2	3
2	(France) F Martin (Canada) D Nestor	6	6

Semifinals
(India) P Raja (India) D Sharan	2	6^{1}
(Germany) A Zverev (Germany) M Zverev	6	7^{7}
4	(New Zealand) M Daniell (Brazil) M Demoliner	4	4
2	(France) F Martin (Canada) D Nestor	6	6

Final
(Germany) A Zverev (Germany) M Zverev	6	6^{3}	[10]
2	(France) F Martin (Canada) D Nestor	4	7^{7}	[7]
