= 2020 Open Sud de France – Singles =

Singles
- 2020 Open Sud de France

Final
- Champion: (France) Gaël Monfils
- Runner-up: (Canada) Vasek Pospisil
- Score: 7–5, 6–3

Details
- Draw: 28 (4 Q / 3 WC )
- Seeds: 8

Events
| Singles | Doubles |
- Open Sud de France

Jo-Wilfried Tsonga was the defending champion, but chose not to participate this year.

Gaël Monfils won the title, defeating Vasek Pospisil in the final, 7–5, 6–3.

== Seeds ==
The top four seeds received a bye into the second round.

1. (France) Gaël Monfils (champion)
2. (Belgium) David Goffin (semifinals)
3. (Canada) Denis Shapovalov (second round)
4. (Bulgaria) Grigor Dimitrov (second round)
5. (Canada) Félix Auger-Aliassime (second round)
6. (Spain) Pablo Carreño Busta (first round)
7. (Serbia) Filip Krajinović (semifinals)
8. (France) Ugo Humbert (first round)

== Draw ==
Key

- Q = Qualifier
- WC = Wild card
- LL = Lucky loser
- Alt = Alternate
- ITF = ITF entry
- PR = Protected ranking
- SR = Special ranking
- SE = Special exempt
- JE = Junior exempt
- JR = Junior Accelerator Programme entrant
- CO = College Accelerator Programme entrant
- NG = Next Gen Accelerator Program entrant
- w/o = Walkover
- r = Retired
- d = Defaulted

=== Finals ===
Semifinals
1/WC | (France) Gaël Monfils | 7^{7} | 6
7 | (Serbia) Filip Krajinović | 6^{4} | 2
PR | (Canada) Vasek Pospisil | 6 | 1 | 7
2 | (Belgium) David Goffin | 3 | 6 | 5

Final
1/WC | (France) Gaël Monfils | 7 | 6
PR | (Canada) Vasek Pospisil | 5 | 3

=== Top half ===
First round
(France) A Mannarino | 6 | 6^{7} | 6
(Australia) A Popyrin | 0 | 7^{9} | 0
Q | (Finland) E Ruusuvuori | 7^{7} | 4 | 6
(Austria) D Novak | 6^{3} | 6 | 2
(Slovakia) N Gombos | 3 | 6 | 6
6 | (Spain) P Carreño Busta | 6 | 4 | 3
(Portugal) J Sousa | 2 | 6^{6}
(France) G Barrère | 6 | 7^{8}
(Italy) J Sinner | 3 | 4
(Sweden) M Ymer | 6 | 6
Q | (France) E Couacaud | 4 | 4
7 | (Serbia) F Krajinović | 6 | 6

Second round
1/WC | (France) G Monfils | 4 | 6 | 6
(France) A Mannarino | 6 | 1 | 4
Q | (Finland) E Ruusuvuori | 5 | 4
(Slovakia) N Gombos | 7 | 6
4/WC | (Bulgaria) G Dimitrov | 7^{7} | 4 | 5
(France) G Barrère | 6^{4} | 6 | 7
(Sweden) M Ymer | 1 | 1
7 | (Serbia) F Krajinović | 6 | 6

Quarterfinals
1/WC | (France) G Monfils | 6 | 6
(Slovakia) N Gombos | 3 | 4
(France) G Barrère | 2 | 5
7 | (Serbia) F Krajinović | 6 | 7

Semifinals
1/WC | (France) G Monfils | 7^{7} | 6
7 | (Serbia) F Krajinović | 6^{4} | 2

=== Bottom half ===
First round
8 | (France) U Humbert | 4 | 1
(Spain) F López | 6 | 6
(France) G Simon | 4 | 4
(France) R Gasquet | 6 | 6
(Slovenia) A Bedene | 3 | 4
PR | (Canada) V Pospisil | 6 | 6
5/WC | (Canada) F Auger-Aliassime | 6^{5} | 6 | 6
Q | (Bosnia and Herzegovina) D Džumhur | 7^{7} | 2 | 2
Q | (Ukraine) S Stakhovsky | 2 | 5
(France) P-H Herbert | 6 | 7
(Kazakhstan) A Bublik | 6^{2} | 6 | 7^{7}
(Switzerland) H Laaksonen | 7^{7} | 1 | 6^{2}

Second round
(Spain) F López | 7^{7} | 4 | 2
(France) R Gasquet | 6^{1} | 6 | 6
PR | (Canada) V Pospisil | 6 | 6
3 | (Canada) D Shapovalov | 2 | 3
5/WC | (Canada) F Auger-Aliassime | 6^{2} | 5
(France) P-H Herbert | 7^{7} | 7
(Kazakhstan) A Bublik | 3 | 6^{9}
2 | (Belgium) D Goffin | 6 | 7^{11}

Quarterfinals
(France) R Gasquet | 1 | 0^{r}
PR | (Canada) V Pospisil | 6 | 1
(France) P-H Herbert | 4 | 6^{5}
2 | (Belgium) D Goffin | 6 | 7^{7}

Semifinals
PR | (Canada) V Pospisil | 6 | 1 | 7
2 | (Belgium) D Goffin | 3 | 6 | 5

== Qualifying ==
=== Seeds ===
1. (Bosnia and Herzegovina) Damir Džumhur (qualified)
2. (Finland) Emil Ruusuvuori (qualified)
3. (Ukraine) Sergiy Stakhovsky (qualified)
4. (Spain) Guillermo García López (qualifying competition)
5. (Serbia) Danilo Petrović (qualifying competition)
6. (Slovakia) Lukáš Lacko (first round)
7. (France) Nicolas Mahut (qualifying competition)
8. (France) Enzo Couacaud (qualified)

=== Qualifiers ===
1. (Bosnia and Herzegovina) Damir Džumhur
2. (Finland) Emil Ruusuvuori
3. (Ukraine) Sergiy Stakhovsky
4. (France) Enzo Couacaud

=== Qualifying draw ===
==== First qualifier ====
First round
1 | (Bosnia and Herzegovina) Damir Džumhur | 6 | 6
(France) Quentin Halys | 2 | 2
WC | (France) Elliot Benchetrit | 6 | 6
6 | (Slovakia) Lukáš Lacko | 3 | 3

Qualifying competition
1 | (Bosnia and Herzegovina) Damir Džumhur | 6 | 6
WC | (France) Elliot Benchetrit | 2 | 4

==== Second qualifier ====
First round
2 | (Finland) Emil Ruusuvuori | 6 | 6
(Germany) Matthias Bachinger | 4 | 4
WC | (France) Hugo Gaston | 2 | 2
7 | (France) Nicolas Mahut | 6 | 6

Qualifying competition
2 | (Finland) Emil Ruusuvuori | 6 | 3 | 7^{7}
7 | (France) Nicolas Mahut | 3 | 6 | 6^{3}

==== Third qualifier ====
First round
3 | (Ukraine) Sergiy Stakhovsky | 6 | 5 | 6
(Russia) Alexey Vatutin | 3 | 7 | 1
(Japan) Hiroki Moriya | 4 | 6^{8}
5 | (Serbia) Danilo Petrović | 6 | 7^{10}

Qualifying competition
3 | (Ukraine) Sergiy Stakhovsky | 6 | 6
5 | (Serbia) Danilo Petrović | 2 | 4

==== Fourth qualifier ====
First round
4 | (Spain) Guillermo García López | 6 | 6
(Germany) Dustin Brown | 3 | 3
(Argentina) Marco Trungelliti | 3 | 6^{7}
8 | (France) Enzo Couacaud | 6 | 7^{9}

Qualifying competition
4 | (Spain) Guillermo García López | 3 | 3
8 | (France) Enzo Couacaud | 6 | 6
