= 2017 Open Sud de France – Singles =

Singles
- 2017 Open Sud de France

Final
- Champion: (Germany) Alexander Zverev
- Runner-up: (France) Richard Gasquet
- Score: 7–6^{(7–4)}, 6–3

Details
- Draw: 28 (4 Q / 3 WC )
- Seeds: 8

Events
Singles	Doubles
- Open Sud de France

Richard Gasquet was the two-time defending champion, but lost to Alexander Zverev in the final, 6–7^{(4–7)}, 3–6.

== Seeds ==
The top four seeds receive a bye into the second round.

1. (Croatia) Marin Čilić (second round)
2. (France) Jo-Wilfried Tsonga (semifinals)
3. (France) Richard Gasquet (final)
4. (Germany) Alexander Zverev (champion)
5. (Spain) Feliciano López (second round)
6. (Germany) Mischa Zverev (first round)
7. (Spain) Marcel Granollers (first round)
8. (Spain) Fernando Verdasco (second round)

== Draw ==
Key

- Q = Qualifier
- WC = Wild card
- LL = Lucky loser
- Alt = Alternate
- ITF = ITF entry
- PR = Protected ranking
- SR = Special ranking
- SE = Special exempt
- JE = Junior exempt
- JR = Junior Accelerator Programme entrant
- CO = College Accelerator Programme entrant
- NG = Next Gen Accelerator Program entrant
- w/o = Walkover
- r = Retired
- d = Defaulted

=== Finals ===
Semifinals
(France) Benoît Paire	2	2
3	(France) Richard Gasquet	6	6
4/WC	(Germany) Alexander Zverev	6^{6}	6	6
2	(France) Jo-Wilfried Tsonga	7^{8}	2	4

Final
3	(France) Richard Gasquet	6^{4}	3
4/WC	(Germany) Alexander Zverev	7^{7}	6

=== Top half ===
First round
(Germany) D Brown	7^{7}	6
(Spain) G García López	6^{4}	3
(France) B Paire	7^{7}	6
(Russia) K Khachanov	6^{4}	4
Q	(France) J Benneteau	3	6	6^{0}
5/WC	(Spain) F López	6	4	7^{7}
Q	(France) T Lamasine	6	5	6^{3}
(Tunisia) M Jaziri	1	7	7^{7}
(Ukraine) I Marchenko	6	6
WC	(France) Q Halys	4	4
Q	(France) K de Schepper	6	6
6	(Germany) M Zverev	4	3

Second round
1	(Croatia) M Čilić	4	4
(Germany) D Brown	6	6
(France) B Paire	6	7^{7}
5/WC	(Spain) F López	4	6^{5}
3	(France) R Gasquet	7	6
(Tunisia) M Jaziri	5	2
(Ukraine) I Marchenko	6^{9}	6^{2}
Q	(France) K de Schepper	7^{11}	7^{7}

Quarterfinals
(Germany) D Brown	0^{r}
(France) B Paire	1
3	(France) R Gasquet	6	5	6
Q	(France) K de Schepper	2	7	4

Semifinals
(France) B Paire	2	2
3	(France) R Gasquet	6	6

=== Bottom half ===
First round
7	(Spain) M Granollers	0	6	3
(France) J Chardy	6	3	6
(France) P-H Mathieu	6	4	6
LL	(France) V Millot	2	6	4
(United Kingdom) A Bedene	7	4	6
(Croatia) B Ćorić	5	6	1
8	(Spain) F Verdasco	6	6
LL	(France) G Barrère	2	1
(Russia) D Medvedev	6	7^{7}
(Germany) T Kamke	2	6^{3}
Q	(France) C Hemery	3	5
(France) P-H Herbert	6	7

Second round
(France) J Chardy	3	6	6
(France) P-H Mathieu	6	1	4
(United Kingdom) A Bedene	5	6	4
4/WC	(Germany) A Zverev	7	3	6
8	(Spain) F Verdasco	3	3
(Russia) D Medvedev	6	6
(France) P-H Herbert	1	2
2	(France) J-W Tsonga	6	6

Quarterfinals
(France) J Chardy	4	6	2
4/WC	(Germany) A Zverev	6	4	6
(Russia) D Medvedev	2	5
2	(France) J-W Tsonga	6	7

Semifinals
4/WC	(Germany) A Zverev	6^{6}	6	6
2	(France) J-W Tsonga	7^{8}	2	4

== Qualifying ==
=== Seeds ===
1. (France) Julien Benneteau (qualified)
2. (France) Vincent Millot (Qualifying competition, lucky loser)
3. (France) Kenny de Schepper (qualified)
4. (Spain) Albert Montañés (first round)
5. (Spain) Enrique López Pérez (first round)
6. (Italy) Stefano Napolitano (qualifying competition)
7. (Germany) Jeremy Jahn (first round)
8. (France) Tristan Lamasine (qualified)

=== Qualifiers ===
1. (France) Julien Benneteau
2. (France) Calvin Hemery
3. (France) Kenny de Schepper
4. (France) Tristan Lamasine

=== Lucky losers ===
1. (France) Vincent Millot
2. (France) Grégoire Barrère

=== Qualifying draw ===
==== First qualifier ====
First round
1	(France) Julien Benneteau	6	6
Alt	(France) Fabrice Martin	4	4
Alt	(India) Divij Sharan	4	0
6	(Italy) Stefano Napolitano	6	6

Qualifying competition
1	(France) Julien Benneteau	3	6	6
6	(Italy) Stefano Napolitano	6	4	4

==== Second qualifier ====
First round
2	(France) Vincent Millot	6	6
WC	(France) Corentin Moutet	3	3
WC	(France) Calvin Hemery	6	6
5	(Spain) Enrique López Pérez	3	4

Qualifying competition
2	(France) Vincent Millot	3	4
WC	(France) Calvin Hemery	6	6

==== Third qualifier ====
First round
3	(France) Kenny de Schepper	7^{9}	6
(Russia) Aslan Karatsev	6^{7}	2
(France) Grégoire Barrère	6	6
7	(Germany) Jeremy Jahn	2	3

Qualifying competition
3	(France) Kenny de Schepper	7^{7}	6
(France) Grégoire Barrère	6^{2}	2

==== Fourth qualifier ====
First round
4	(Spain) Albert Montañés	4	5
(France) Jonathan Eysseric	6	7
(Spain) Jordi Samper Montaña	6^{4}	0
8	(France) Tristan Lamasine	7^{7}	6

Qualifying competition
(France) Jonathan Eysseric	6	6^{4}	3
8	(France) Tristan Lamasine	4	7^{7}	6
