= Sud de France Arena =

Indoor arena in Montpellier, France

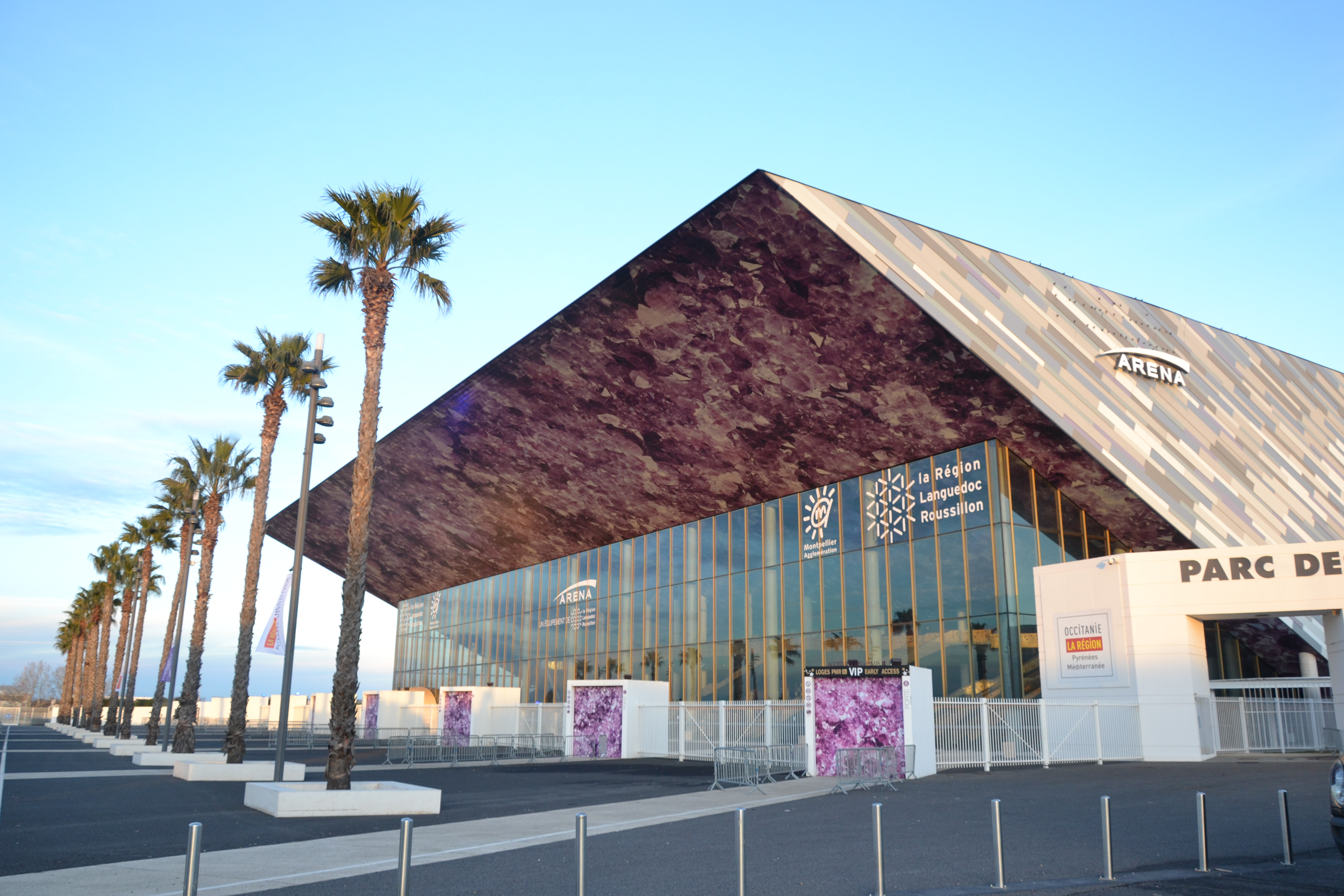
- Interactive map of Sud de France Arena
- Former names: Arena Montpellier (2010–2011); Park&Suites Arena (2011–2016); L'Arena Montpellier (2016–2017); Sud de France Arena (2017–present)
- Location: Pérols, Hérault, France
- Coordinates: 43.5734°N 3.9516°E
- Owner: Occitanie
- Capacity: 14,000 (concerts); 10,700 (basketball); 9,000 (handball); 7,500 (tennis tournaments)

Construction
- Groundbreaking: October 2008
- Opened: 8 September 2010
- Cost: €53 million
- Architect: Cabinet A+ Architecture

Tenant
- Montpellier Handball (European matches)

Sud de France Arena ("South of France Arena", also known as the Arena Montpellier) is an indoor arena located in the Montpellier suburb of Pérols, Hérault, in the south of France, that opened in September 2010. It has a concert seating capacity of 14,000 spectators, with about 10,000 for sporting events.

== Notable events ==
The arena is the host of the Open Occitanie tennis tournament since 2010.

It was host to the European matches of Montpellier Handball. In 2011, it also hosted the XXXI World Rhythmic Gymnastics Championships which served as a qualification process for the 2012 Summer Olympics. The arena hosted the 2015 European Artistic Gymnastics Championships on April 13–19.

In May 2013, American icon Beyoncé performed a sold-out concert there as part of her The Mrs Carter Show World Tour, marking her first show in Montpellier as well as her last arena concert in France.

The arena hosted the Violetta Live International Tour, recording the video clips of the concert that are now published. American pop singer Katy Perry also performed there during her Prismatic World Tour on 17 February 2015.

The venue hosted a group of the FIBA EuroBasket 2015, and some matches of the 2017 World Men's Handball Championship.

In 2021, the arena hosted the UCI Urban Cycling World Championships.

In March 2022, it hosted the World Figure Skating Championships.

In October 2023, the stadium held the finals of the TrackMania Esports Ascension tournament, which was hosted by French vlogger and YouTube personality Zerator, as well as Twitch streamer Etoiles.

Since October 2024, the arena has also hosted the WTT Champions Montpellier event, which saw the Montpellier born table tennis star, Félix Lebrun become the champion at just 18 years old.

== See also ==
- List of indoor arenas in France
