= Lucas Pouille =

French tennis player (born 1994)

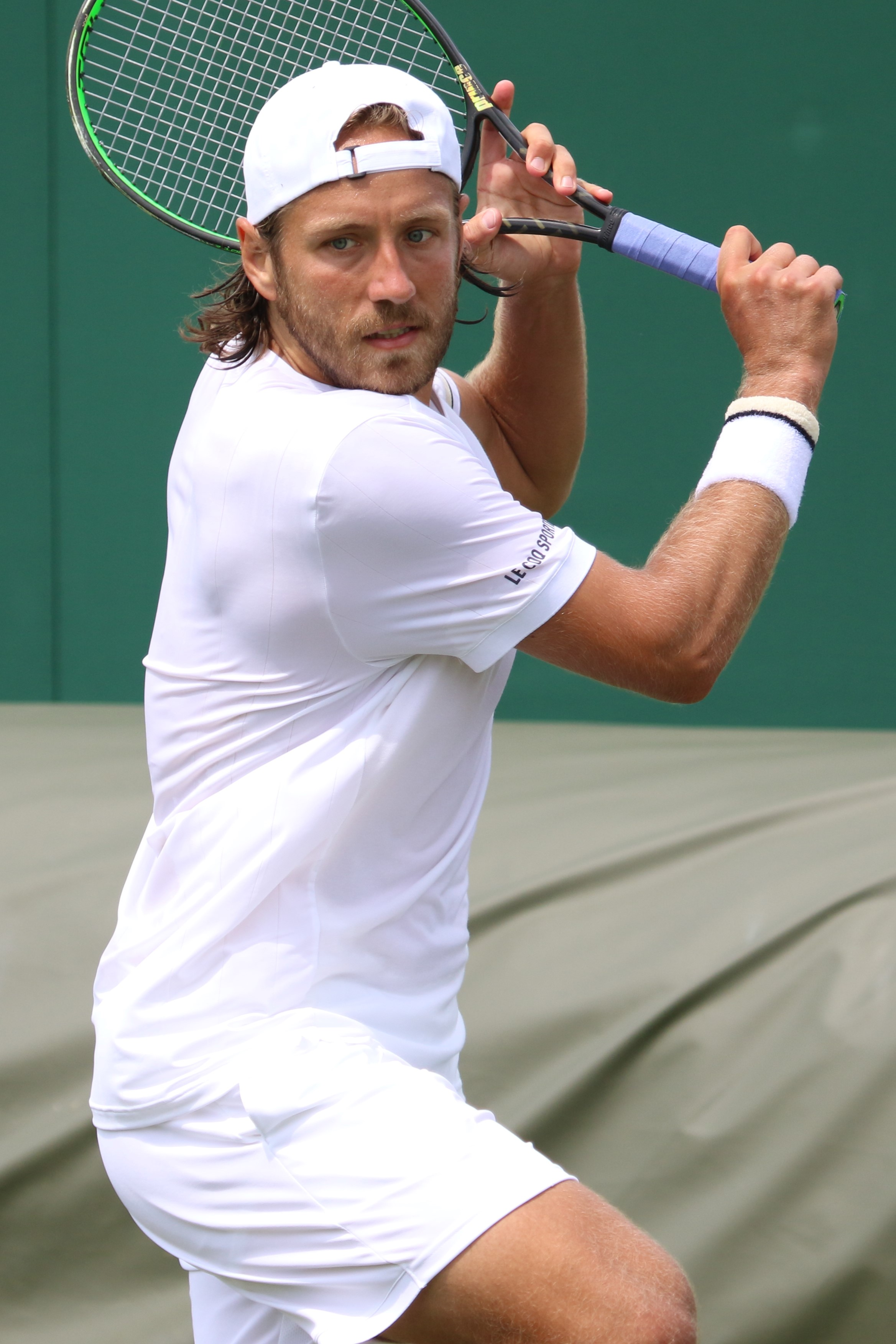
- Pouille at the 2023 Wimbledon Championships
- Country (sports): France
- Residence: Rennes, France
- Born: 23 February 1994 (age 32) Grande-Synthe, France
- Height: 1.85 m (6 ft 1 in)
- Turned pro: 2012
- Plays: Right-handed (two-handed backhand)
- Coach: Emmanuel Planque (2012–2018), Amélie Mauresmo (2019–2020), Thierry Ascione, Nicolas Renavand (2021-2024), Éric Winogradsky (2023-), Nicolas Copin (2024-)
- Prize money: US $8,834,022
- Official website: lucaspouille.com

Singles
- Career record: 143–134
- Career titles: 5
- Highest ranking: No. 10 (19 March 2018)

Grand Slam singles results
- Australian Open: SF (2019)
- French Open: 3R (2017, 2018)
- Wimbledon: QF (2016)
- US Open: QF (2016)

Doubles
- Career record: 30–61
- Career titles: 0
- Highest ranking: No. 79 (11 April 2016)

Grand Slam doubles results
- Australian Open: SF (2016)
- French Open: 3R (2024)
- Wimbledon: 1R (2015, 2016)
- US Open: 2R (2015)

Mixed doubles
- Career record: 3–1

Grand Slam mixed doubles results
- French Open: 1R (2023)

Team competitions
- Davis Cup: W (2017)
- Hopman Cup: RR (2019)
- Last updated on: 1 September 2026.

Lucas Pouille (French pronunciation: [lykɑ puj], born 23 February 1994) is a French former professional tennis player. He has a career-high ATP singles ranking of world No. 10, achieved on 19 March 2018 and a career-high ATP doubles ranking of world No. 79, achieved on 11 April 2016. He has won five singles titles on the ATP Tour and was on the winning French Davis Cup team in 2017. He won the decisive match against Steve Darcis for the title.

== Personal life ==
Pouille's mother is a Swedish-speaking Finn from Närpes, Finland. He has two brothers, and his family comes from northern France, at Loon-Plage near Dunkerque. He married his long-time girlfriend Clémence Bertrand in September 2019 and their daughter Rose was born in January 2021. He moved to Dubai in 2015 but moved back to France, to Rennes, in 2020. Le Coq Sportif and Babolat are his current sponsors.

== Career ==
=== 2009-11: Beginnings ===
In 2009, Pouille played (only the singles events of) two tournaments, both of them ITF Men's Circuit tournaments held in France.

In 2010, Pouille played (only the singles events of) five tournaments – an ATP Challenger Tour tournament in Saint–Brieuc held in March/April and four ITF Men's Circuit tournaments held in France.

In 2011, Pouille played (only the singles events of) seven tournaments – an ATP Challenger Tour tournament in Saint–Brieuc and six ITF Men's Circuit tournaments.

=== 2012: Turned Pro ===
In 2012, Pouille played the singles event of one ATP Challenger Tour tournament (in Quimper) and the singles events of 15 ITF Men's Circuit tournaments. He won two back-to-back ITF Men's Circuit singles titles in Mexico without dropping a set and was the singles runner-up at two ITF Men's Circuit tournaments (in Sweden and Serbia).

=== 2013: Grand Slam debut ===
Pouille made his Grand Slam singles debut at the Australian Open after receiving a wildcard for the singles qualifying competition; he lost in the second qualifying round to Ruben Bemelmans.

Pouille made his ATP World Tour singles debut as a wildcard at the tournament in Montpellier, where he lost his opening singles match in the first round of the main draw to the No. 7 seed Viktor Troicki in straight sets. Pouille also lost his opening singles match in the first round of the main draw of his next ATP World Tour tournament in Marseille as a wildcard, this time to Julien Benneteau.

Pouille appeared in the singles main draw of a Grand Slam event for the first time in his career at the 2013 French Open, thanks to a singles main draw wildcard; in the first round, he defeated American wildcard Alex Kuznetsov in straight sets, but lost in the second round to the No. 26 seed Grigor Dimitrov in straight sets.

In June, Pouille qualified (he had to win three singles qualifying matches) for the singles main draw of an ATP World Tour tournament for the first time in his career at the grass court tournament in 's-Hertogenbosch; he lost his singles main draw first-round match to Jérémy Chardy. In July, Pouille won his second ITF Men's Circuit singles title of 2013 in Estonia (he had earlier in April won the ITF Men's Circuit Vietnam F3 singles title). In October, Pouille lost in the singles semifinals of the ATP Challenger Tour tournament in Kazan, which was hitherto his best singles performance in an ATP Challenger Tour tournament.

=== 2014: Masters 1000 debut, Top 150 debut ===
Pouille received wildcards for the singles main draw of the 2014 Australian Open and the 2014 French Open, where he lost in the first round to Dušan Lajović and Juan Mónaco respectively.

In September, Pouille reached his first career ATP Challenger Tour singles final in Meknes; he lost the final to Kimmer Coppejans in three sets. At the 2014 Paris Masters, Pouille entered the singles main draw after defeating Steve Johnson and Jarkko Nieminen in the qualifying rounds. In the singles main draw, he defeated Ivo Karlović and Fabio Fognini to reach the third round, where he lost to the No. 2 seed Roger Federer (4–6, 4–6).

At the 2014 BNP Paribas Masters, Pouille qualified by not dropping a set in his four singles victories over players who were ranked at least 100 places higher than him in the ATP singles rankings on his way to the third round, losing to No. 2 seed Roger Federer. As a result of this successful run immediately following the tournament, on 3 November 2018 his ATP singles ranking jumped to world No. 134 compared to world No. 176 seven days ago. Pouille finished the year as the youngest Frenchman in the Top 150 of the ATP singles rankings, with a final singles match win–loss record of 28–17 on the 2014 ATP Challenger Tour.

=== 2015: Top 100 debut ===
Pouille was defeated in the third and final singles qualifying round of the Heineken Open by Jiří Veselý but entered the singles main draw as a lucky loser after the top seed David Ferrer's withdrawal from the tournament; in the singles main draw, he won his second round and quarterfinal matches to reach his first career ATP World Tour singles semifinal, where he lost to Adrian Mannarino in three sets. Pouille received a wildcard for the singles main draw of the 2015 Australian Open and lost to the No. 17 seed Gaël Monfils in five sets (Pouille was leading by two sets to love) in the first round. At the Monte Carlo Masters, he entered the singles main draw as a wildcard and defeated Dominic Thiem (6–4, 6–4) to reach the second round, where he was defeated by the No. 3 seed Rafael Nadal (2–6, 1–6). On 20 April, Pouille attained a career-high ATP singles ranking of world number 98 and broke into the top 100 of the ATP singles rankings for the first time in his career.

Pouille was defeated by Gilles Simon in first round of the French Open and by Kevin Anderson in the first round of Wimbledon. At the German Open in Hamburg, Pouille earned a place in the singles main draw by winning two qualifying matches; in the singles main draw, he defeated Íñigo Cervantes, Juan Mónaco and Benoît Paire to reach his second career ATP World Tour and first ATP World Tour 500 series singles semifinal, where he lost to Fabio Fognini in two sets. On 3 August, Pouille achieved a career-high singles ranking of world number 64 in the ATP singles rankings. In the second half of the year, Pouille managed to advance beyond the round of 16 of the singles main draw in two ATP World Tour tournaments, in St. Petersburg (in September) and Moscow (in October), losing to Roberto Bautista Agut in the quarterfinals in both tournaments and both times in straight sets. In November, Pouille reached his second career ATP Challenger Tour singles final in Mouilleron-le-Captif, losing the final to Benoît Paire in three sets. He finished the year with a final singles match win–loss record of 17–8 on the 2015 ATP Challenger Tour.

=== 2016: Two Grand Slam quarterfinals ===
At the Australian Open, the unseeded pair of Pouille and Adrian Mannarino lost in the doubles semifinals to Jamie Murray and Bruno Soares. Pouille lost in the first round of the singles event of the Australian Open to 13th-seeded Milos Raonic, his third consecutive singles first-round loss at that event.

Pouille defeated 32nd seed Guillermo García-López in the second round and saved one match point in beating eighth seed David Ferrer in the third round to reach the round of 16 of the Miami Open, where he fell to the No. 18 seed Gilles Simon (0–6, 1–6). Pouille was the beneficiary of a singles main draw wildcard at the 2016 Monte Carlo Masters; he defeated Nicolas Mahut in the first round and the No. 9 seed Richard Gasquet before losing to the No. 8 seed Jo-Wilfried Tsonga (4–6, 4–6) in the third round. In April, the unseeded Pouille reached his first ATP World Tour singles final at the BRD Năstase Țiriac Trophy in Bucharest after defeating three seeded players – Ivo Karlović, Paolo Lorenzi and Federico Delbonis in the second round, quarterfinals and semifinals respectively; he lost the final to the unseeded Fernando Verdasco (3–6, 2–6). Pouille won two singles qualifying matches to reach the singles main draw of the Madrid Open; he saved four match points in beating the No. 12 seed David Goffin in the first round of the main draw.

At the Italian Open in Rome, Pouille reached his first career Masters 1000 singles semifinal (after wins over Ernests Gulbis, David Ferrer and Juan Mónaco in the second round, third round and quarterfinals respectively), where he lost to the No. 2 seed Andy Murray (2–6, 1–6). In that tournament, he was defeated in the final qualifying round but entered the second round of the main draw as a lucky loser. Pouille became only the second lucky loser to reach a Masters 1000 singles semifinal (Thomas Johansson was the first to do so, in Toronto in 2004). On 16 May, he broke into the top 32 (at No. 31) of the ATP singles rankings for the first time in his career as a result of his performance at the Italian Open, thus ensuring that he would be seeded in the singles event of the upcoming French Open. Seeded No. 29, he was eliminated in the second round of the French Open by lucky loser Andrej Martin, after a first-round win over countryman Julien Benneteau. He then had a first-round loss at the MercedesCup to John Millman despite winning the first set. He had another first-round loss at the Gerry Weber Open to second seed Kei Nishikori, despite winning the first set again.

Pouille competed at the third Grand Slam event of the year at the 2016 Wimbledon Championships as the 32nd seed. He came into the tournament with an 0–4 ATP World Tour (including the Grand Slams) main draw singles career record on grass and had never contested an ATP Challenger Tour or ITF Men's Circuit singles event on grass. He defeated qualifier Marius Copil in four sets in the first round. He defeated Donald Young in straight sets in the second round. This was the first time Pouille had advanced to the main draw singles third round of a Grand Slam tournament. He defeated Juan Martín del Potro in the third round in four sets despite being a set and a break down. In the fourth round, he defeated 19th seed Bernard Tomic in five sets to advance to the quarterfinals. However, he came up against tenth-seeded Tomáš Berdych and lost in straight sets on Court One. As a result of reaching the Wimbledon quarterfinals, Pouille attained a career-high ATP singles ranking of 21 on 11 July 2016. Pouille lost in the second round of the 2016 Rogers Cup to Rajeev Ram and in the first round of the Cincinnati Masters to Nick Kyrgios.

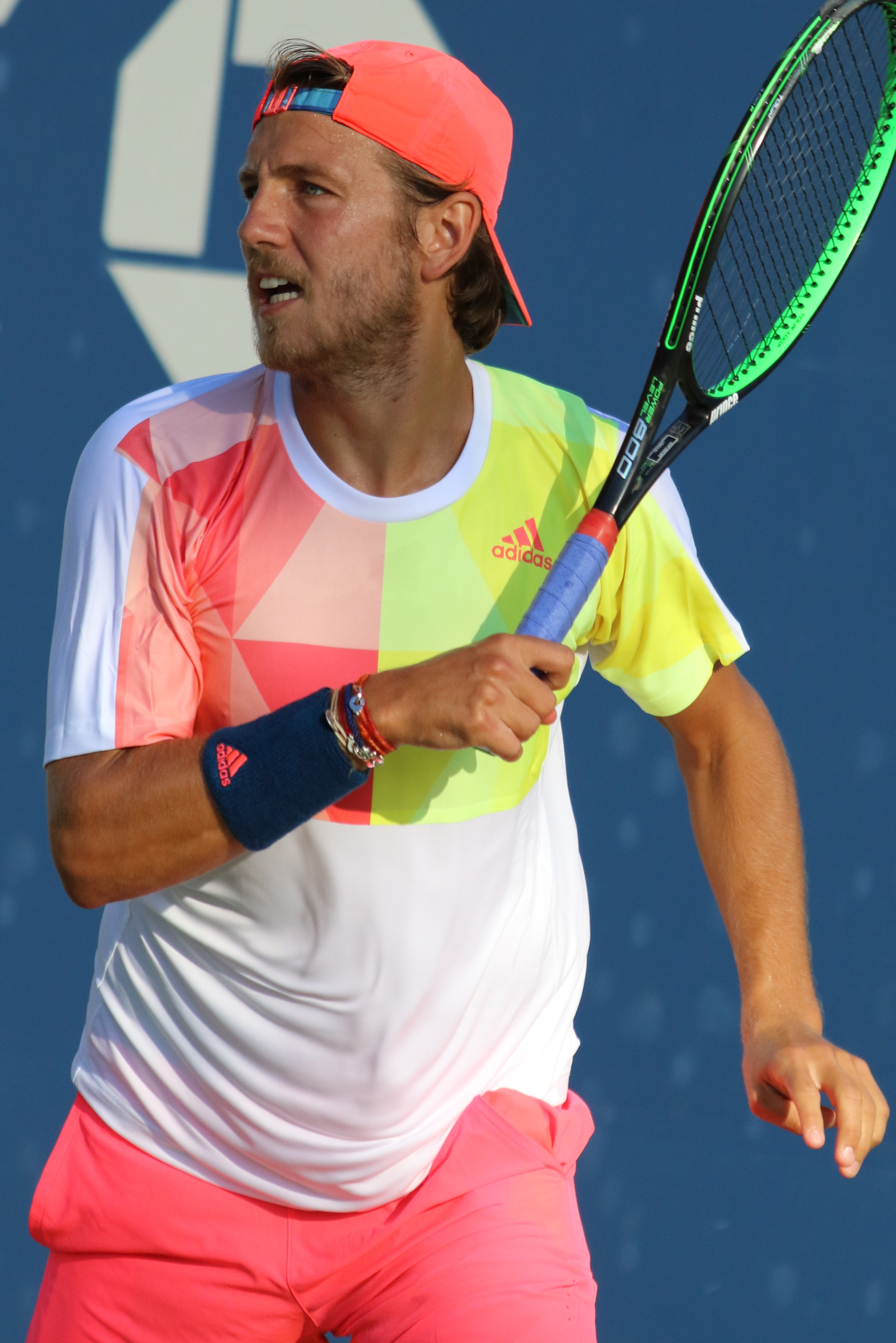
Pouille at the 2016 US Open

At the 2016 US Open, Pouille ousted No. 4 seed Rafael Nadal in five sets (6–1, 2–6, 6–4, 3–6, 7–6 ^{(8–6)}) in the fourth round to reach the quarterfinals. Pouille, Gael Monfils and Jo-Wilfried Tsonga became the first French trio to reach the singles quarterfinals of the same Grand Slam tournament in the Open Era.

At the Moselle Open, Pouille (the third seed of the tournament) reached the final after defeating countrymen Pierre-Hugues Herbert, Julien Benneteau and second-seeded, David Goffin. In the final, Pouille defeated top seed Dominic Thiem (7–6^{(7–5)}, 6–2), winning his first ATP World Tour singles title. As a result, Pouille achieved a career-high ATP singles ranking of 16 on 26 September, overtaking Richard Gasquet to become French No. 3.

Pouille kicked off his Asian leg of the tour at the China Open. Despite being the No. 6 seed of the tournament, Pouille lost in the second round to eventual finalist Grigor Dimitrov. Next, Pouille competed in the Shanghai Masters, in which he was seeded No. 13. He defeated Fernando Verdasco and Nicolás Almagro before falling to the No. 2 seed and eventual champion Andy Murray. Pouille faced off against Murray two weeks later in the third round of the 2016 BNP Paribas Masters in Paris where Murray won again. Pouille achieved a new career-high ATP singles ranking of world number 15 on 7 November. At the end of the year, Pouille received the ATP World Tour Award for the Most Improved Player of the Year.

In December 2016, Ion Țiriac became Pouille's manager.

=== 2017: French Open third round, three titles on three different surfaces ===
Pouille started the season at the Brisbane International, in which he was seeded no. 6. He drew countryman Gilles Simon in the first round and narrowly defeated him, (7–6^{(8–6)}, 7–6^{(7–4)}), after being down 0–5 in the first set. Pouille then played against Kyle Edmund in the second round, but was forced to retire in the second set due to a right big toe injury. That injury further affected him at the Australian Open where, seeded No. 16, he lost in the first round to qualifier Alexander Bublik in four sets.

Pouille then participated at the Rotterdam Open. Seeded eighth, he lost in the first round to Philipp Kohlschreiber in straight sets. The Frenchman turned his season around at the Open 13 by reaching his third career ATP World Tour singles final as the No. 4 seed, where he lost to the second seed and the reigning French No. 1 Jo-Wilfried Tsonga (4–6, 4–6). Pouille (seeded No. 7) continued his good performance by reaching the singles semifinals at the Dubai Tennis Championships, where he lost to the top seed and the reigning world No. 1 Andy Murray (5–7, 1–6); Pouille's straight sets defeat by Murray meant that Pouille had still not won a single set in four matches against Murray.

Pouille reached his second career Masters 1000 singles semifinal at the 2017 Monte Carlo Masters; seeded No. 11, he defeated four lower-ranked players (Ryan Harrison, Paolo Lorenzi, Adrian Mannarino and Pablo Cuevas) before losing his semifinal to the No. 15 seed Albert Ramos Viñolas in three sets. Pouille won his second career ATP World Tour singles title at the Hungarian Open in Budapest; seeded No. 1, he saved two match points in his second-round match against Jiří Veselý before beating Aljaž Bedene (6–3, 6–1) in the final. Pouille reached a new career-high ATP singles ranking of world No. 13 on 8 May 2017.

Seeded No. 16, he reached the third round of the French Open for the first time in his career but lost to the No. 19 seed Albert Ramos-Viñolas in five sets. The fourth-seeded Pouille won the Stuttgart Open after saving one match point in his second-round match against Jan-Lennard Struff and defeating world No. 33 Feliciano López in the final in three close sets.

Seeded No. 16, Pouille lost in the fourth round of the US Open to the No. 29 seed Diego Schwartzman in four sets. In early October, Pouille (who had never defeated a reigning world No. 1 in his career) lost in the first round of the China Open to top seed and world No. 1 Rafael Nadal (6–4, 6–7^{(6–8)}, 5–7), with Pouille failing to convert two match points when he was leading 6–4 in the second-set tie-break. In late October, the unseeded Pouille won his first career ATP World Tour 500 series singles title in Vienna; he beat his eighth-seeded compatriot Jo-Wilfried Tsonga (6–1, 6–4) in the final after defeating four unseeded opponents in the previous four rounds.

Lucas finished the 2017 season as the only player to win at least one ATP World Tour singles title on each surface – Budapest (clay), Stuttgart (grass) and Vienna (indoor hard courts).

In the 2017 Davis Cup World Group final against Belgium, Pouille defeated Steve Darcis (6–3, 6–1, 6–0) in the fifth and final rubber of the tie to give France a 3–2 win and its tenth Davis Cup title (and their first since 2001).

=== 2018: Top 10 debut ===
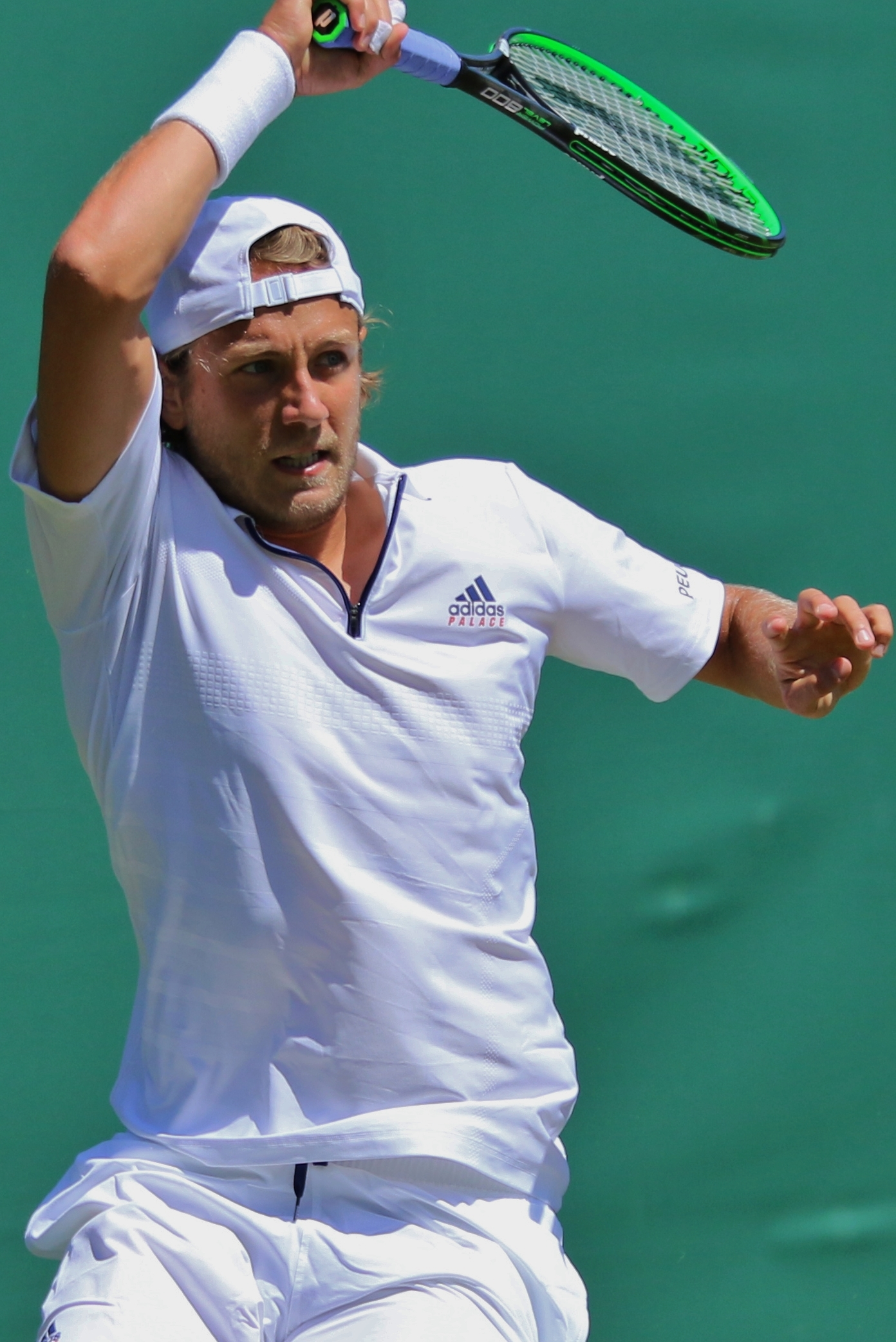
Pouille at the 2018 Wimbledon Championships

Pouille entered the 2018 Australian Open having not played any tournament in the first two weeks of 2018 prior to the Australian Open; this proved fatal for Pouille (seeded No. 18) as he lost in the singles main draw first round of the opening Grand Slam tournament of the year for the fifth consecutive year, this time to the Belgian qualifier Ruben Bemelmans. Pouille was called up to play for France in the 2018 Davis Cup World Group first-round tie against the Netherlands, but he withdrew a few hours before the start of his first singles match on 2 February against Thiemo de Bakker because of torticollis and was replaced by Adrian Mannarino.

Pouille won the fifth ATP World Tour singles title of his career at the Open Sud de France; he saved two match points when he was down 1–6, 3–5 against Jo-Wilfried Tsonga in the semifinals before subsequently defeating Richard Gasquet in the final. Pouille lost his opening singles match, against Andrey Rublev, in his next tournament held the following week in Rotterdam. Over the next two weeks, Pouille lost in the singles finals of two ATP World Tour tournaments, losing to Karen Khachanov and Roberto Bautista Agut in Marseille and Dubai respectively. Less than seven days after the Dubai final, the ninth-seeded Pouille suffered a shock opening round defeat against the Indian qualifier Yuki Bhambri in Indian Wells.

On 19 March 2018, Pouille broke into Top 10 of the ATP singles rankings for the first time in his career, attaining a career-high ATP singles ranking of world number 10. After winning both singles matches (he defeated Andreas Seppi and Fabio Fognini) in the 2018 Davis Cup World Group quarterfinal tie against Italy, he suffered a mini slump and lost his opening singles match in three consecutive clay court tournaments – Monte Carlo, Budapest and Madrid. In June, Pouille reached his fourth and final ATP World Tour singles semifinal of 2018 in Stuttgart, where he lost to Milos Raonic.

Pouille failed to advance beyond the singles round of 16 in any of the eight tournaments (Wimbledon, Washington D.C., Toronto, Cincinnati, the US Open, Stockholm, Vienna and Paris) that he played in the second half of 2018. However, he won all three of thesingles matches that he contested in the 2018 Davis Cup World Group quarterfinal and semifinal ties against Italy and Spain respectively, to help France advance to the final. In the final, Pouille played only one match, which was the third singles rubber of the tie. He lost his match against Marin Čilić in straight sets and that enabled Croatia to take an unassailable 3–1 lead.

On 8 November 2018, Pouille announced that he and Emmanuel Planque, his coach since 2012, had decided to end immediately their player-coach collaboration by mutual agreement. On 6 December 2018, L'Équipe reported that Amélie Mauresmo would coach Pouille starting from the beginning of 2019. The following day, Mauresmo resigned from her post as the captain of the French Davis Cup team to avoid a conflict of interest.

=== 2019: First Grand Slam semifinal, third Masters quarterfinal ===
In 2019, he played the first Grand Slam semi-final of his career, at the Australian Open.

Pouille began his season in Sydney, where seeded sixth, he lost in the first round to the Russian qualifier Andrey Rublev in straight sets.

At the Australian Open, Pouille was seeded 28th and won the first Australian Open main draw singles match of his career, defeating Mikhail Kukushkin in straight sets in the first round. He then defeated Maximilian Marterer before triumphing over Australian wildcard Alexei Popyrin in five sets. In the fourth round, he faced 11th seed Borna Ćorić, defeating him in four sets. In his first Grand Slam singles quarterfinal since the 2016 US Open, he faced 16th seed Milos Raonic, whom he defeated in four sets. He thus advanced to his first Grand Slam singles semifinal, where he lost to the top seed Novak Djokovic in three sets.

Pouille lost his opening singles match in his next five tournaments (Montpellier, Indian Wells, Miami, Monte Carlo, and Barcelona). To recover his form, the Frenchman played the ATP Challenger Tour tournament in Bordeaux, where he won the singles title after defeating Mikael Ymer in the final. At the 2019 Madrid Open the following week, he defeated the thirteenth seed Borna Ćorić in the first round, before losing to the Polish qualifier Hubert Hurkacz in the second round.

He reached his third Masters 1000 quarterfinal at the 2019 Western & Southern Open by defeating World No. 9 Karen Khachanov, his first Top 10 win in nearly three years. He was defeated by World No. 1 Novak Djokovic. He lost also to Djokovic in the 2019 Japan Open in Tokyo in the quarterfinals. His last tournament for 2019 was the 2019 Shanghai Masters in October when he ended his season due to a right elbow injury.

=== 2021-23: Return after hiatus due to surgery, out of top 600, back to Majors ===
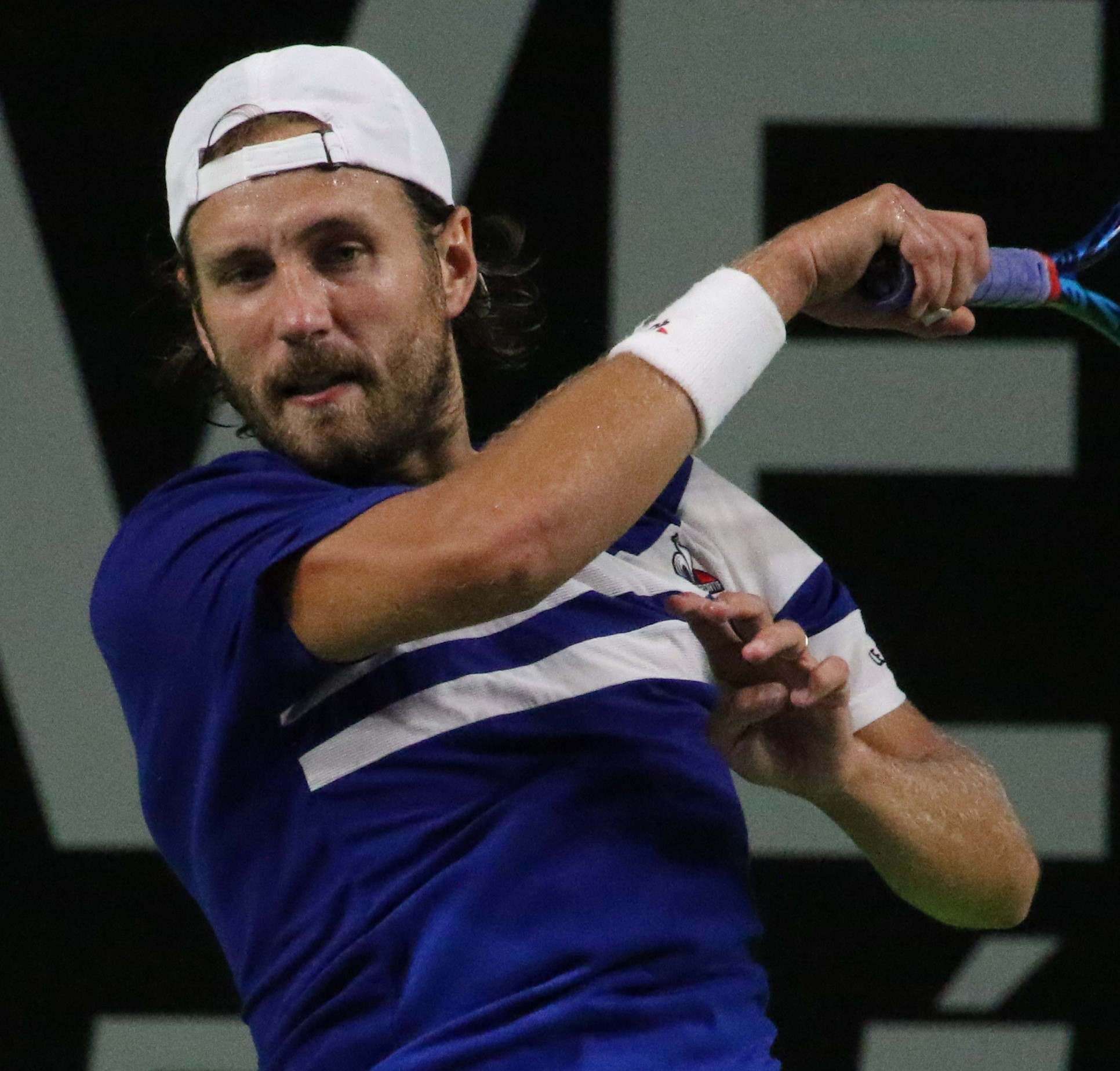
Pouille at the 2021 Internationaux de Tennis de Vendée

Pouille returned from right elbow surgery in January by playing at the 2021 Open Quimper Bretagne. As the top seed, he lost in the first round to eventual finalist Filip Horanský. Seeded second at the Open Quimper Bretagne II, he was defeated in the second round by qualifier Tobias Kamke He pulled out of the Australian Open due to the advice of his team. In Montpellier, Pouille was eliminated in the first round by wildcard and compatriot, Benjamin Bonzi. At the Open 13, he was beaten in the second round by second seed and two-time defending champion, Stefanos Tsitsipas. As the top seed in Biella, he lost in the second round to Illya Marchenko.

Pouille kicked off his clay-court season at the Andalucía Open. He was defeated in the first round by Ričardas Berankis. At the Monte-Carlo Masters, he earned his first top-100 victory since Tokyo in 2019 by beating World No. 48 Guido Pella in the first round. In the second round, he defeated another top 100 player, Alexei Popyrin. He ended up losing his third-round match to Alejandro Davidovich Fokina. At the French Open, he fell in the first round to Pablo Cuevas.

Starting his grass-court season at the Stuttgart Open, Pouille lost in the first round of qualifying to Altuğ Çelikbilek. At the Queen's Club Championships, he was beaten in the first round of qualifying by Viktor Troicki. Getting past qualifying at the first edition of the Mallorca Championships, he was defeated in the first round by sixth seed Karen Khachanov. At 2021 Wimbledon, he lost in the first round to 29th seed Cameron Norrie.

After Wimbledon, Pouille competed at the Hamburg Open. He was eliminated in the first round by fifth seed Dušan Lajović. In Umag, he lost in the first round to seventh seed and eventual champion, Carlos Alcaraz. At the Generali Open Kitzbühel, he was defeated in the first round by eventual finalist Pedro Martínez.

Coming through qualifying at the Winston-Salem Open, Pouille was eliminated in the second round by third seed Dan Evans. At the 2021 US Open, he was beaten in the first round by Albert Ramos Viñolas. After his early exit from the 2021 US Open, Pouille competed at the Cassis Open Provence. Seeded fifth, he reached the final where he lost to top seed Benjamin Bonzi. Seeded sixth at the Open de Rennes, he reached the quarterfinals where he fell to second seed, defending champion, and compatriot Arthur Rinderknech. Playing as a wildcard at the Moselle Open, he was defeated in the second round by top seed and eventual champion Hubert Hurkacz. Before the last Masters 1000 of the year, Pouille went back to play a couple of Challengers but did not find a way to really get going. He fell in the second round in 2021 Open d'Orléans against Richard Gasquet and in the second round of the 2021 Internationaux de Tennis de Vendée in Mouilleron-le-Captif, France against Elias Ymer whom he had just beaten in Orléans. Pouille played the last match of his season as a wildcard at the 2021 Rolex Paris Masters then, losing in the first round of the qualifying draw against Lorenzo Musetti.

He received wildcards for the 2022 Australian Open and for the 2022 French Open. Ranked No. 670 he qualified for the main draw of the 2023 French Open defeating Jurij Rodionov in the last round of qualifying. Next he defeated Rodionov again, who qualified as a lucky loser, to reach the second round.

=== 2024: Back to Masters & top 100, Wimbledon third round ===
Ranked No. 273, he reached the main draw of the 2024 BNP Paribas Open having received a wildcard for the qualifying competition. He won his first round match over Daniel Altmaier and returned to the top 250, climbing more than 30 positions in the rankings on 18 March 2024.

In April, ranked No. 241, he qualified for the 2024 Estoril Open. In May, Pouille won his first Challenger title in five years at the 2024 Upper Austria Open in Mauthausen, defeating Jozef Kovalik in the final. As a result, he returned to the top 165, climbing more than 60 positions in the rankings on 20 May 2024.

Ranked No. 213, he qualified for the main draw of the 2024 Wimbledon Championships after a two-year absence at this Major. He defeated Laslo Djere in five sets, his first main draw win at Wimbledon in five years. Next, he reached the third round after Thanasi Kokkinakis retired in the third set. As a result, he moved up more than 60 positions back into the top 150 in the rankings.

In September, Pouille reached the final at the 2024 Saint-Tropez Open, losing to Gijs Brouwer in the final. In October, he won the next Challenger on home soil in Mouilleron-le-Captif, France and reached one position shy of the top 100 in the singles rankings on 14 October 2024. After reaching another Challenger final at the 2024 Open Saint-Brieuc a week later, he returned to the top 100 in the rankings on 21 October 2024.

=== 2025-2026: Achilles injury and coaching ===
In February 2025, Pouille retired in the final of the Play In Challenger in Lille, France. He later confirmed he had suffered a rupture of his Achilles tendon.

Pouille started coaching compatriot Arthur Rinderknech in June 2025, after Roland Garros, for the grass season. Later he extended his coaching experience and accompanied Rinderknech at the 2025 US Open, and at the 2026 United Cup, doing double duty as the captain of team France as well.

== Career statistics ==
=== Grand Slam performance timeline ===
Key
W	F	SF	QF	#R	RR	Q#	DNQ	A	NH

(W) winner; (F) finalist; (SF) semifinalist; (QF) quarterfinalist; (#R) rounds 4, 3, 2, 1; (RR) round-robin stage; (Q#) qualification round; (DNQ) did not qualify; (A) absent; (NH) not held; (SR) strike rate (events won / competed); (W–L) win–loss record.
To avoid confusion and double counting, these charts are updated at the conclusion of a tournament or when the player's participation has ended.

Current through to the 2025 Australian Open.

Tournament	2013	2014	2015	2016	2017	2018	2019	2020	2021	2022	2023	2024	2025	SR	W–L	Win %
Australian Open	Q2	1R	1R	1R	1R	1R	SF	A	A	1R	A	A	1R	0 / 8	5–8	38%
French Open	2R	1R	1R	2R	3R	3R	2R	A	1R	1R	2R	Q1	A	0 / 10	8–10	44%
Wimbledon	A	Q1	1R	QF	2R	2R	3R	NH	1R	A	Q3	3R	A	0 / 7	10–6	63%
US Open	Q2	A	1R	QF	4R	3R	2R	A	1R	A	A	Q3	A	0 / 6	10–6	63%
Win–loss	1–1	0–2	0–4	9–4	6–4	5–4	9–4	0–0	0–3	0–2	1–1	2–0	0–1	0 / 31	33–30	52%

Awards
Preceded by (South Korea) Hyeon Chung	ATP Most Improved Player; 2016	Succeeded by (Canada) Denis Shapovalov
