= 2024 Moselle Open =

- Date: 3–9 November
- Edition: 21st
- Category: ATP Tour 250 series
- Surface: Hard (indoor)
- Location: Metz, France
- Venue: Arènes de Metz

Champions

Singles
- (France) Benjamin Bonzi

Doubles
- (Netherlands) Sander Arends / (United Kingdom) Luke Johnson
- Moselle Open

The 2024 Moselle Open was a men's tennis tournament played on indoor hardcourts. It was the 21st edition of the event, and part of the ATP 250 tournaments on the 2024 ATP Tour. It took place at the Arènes de Metz from 3 November to 9 November 2024.

== Champions ==
=== Singles ===
- (France) Benjamin Bonzi def. (United Kingdom) Cameron Norrie 7–6^{(8–6)}, 6–4

=== Doubles ===
- (Netherlands) Sander Arends / (United Kingdom) Luke Johnson def. (France) Pierre-Hugues Herbert / (France) Albano Olivetti, 6–4, 3–6, [10–3]

== Singles main-draw entrants ==
=== Seeds ===
| Country | Player | Rank^{1} | Seed |
|---|---|---|---|
| | Andrey Rublev | 7 | 1 |
| NOR | Casper Ruud | 8 | 2 |
| ~~BUL~~ | ~~Grigor Dimitrov~~ | ~~9~~ | ~~3~~ |
| ~~DEN~~ | ~~Holger Rune~~ | ~~13~~ | ~~4~~ |
| ~~FRA~~ | ~~Ugo Humbert~~ | ~~18~~ | ~~5~~ |
| ESP | Pedro Martínez | 41 | 6 |
| GER | Jan-Lennard Struff | 42 | 7 |
| USA | Alex Michelsen | 44 | 8 |

- ^{1} Rankings are as of 28 October 2024

=== Other entrants ===
The following players received wildcards into the singles main draw:

- ~~(Bulgaria) Grigor Dimitrov~~
- (France) Richard Gasquet
- (France) Harold Mayot

The following players received a late entry into the main draw:

- Andrey Rublev

The following players received entry from the qualifying draw:

- (France) Benjamin Bonzi
- ~~(France) Arthur Cazaux~~
- (Netherlands) Jesper de Jong
- (France) Quentin Halys

The following players received entry as lucky losers:

- (France) Grégoire Barrère
- (France) Manuel Guinard
- (France) Titouan Droguet
- (France) Pierre-Hugues Herbert
- (France) Théo Papamalamis
- (France) Luca Van Assche

=== Withdrawals ===
- (Canada) Félix Auger-Aliassime → (Argentina) Facundo Díaz Acosta → replaced by (France) Grégoire Barrère
- (Italy) Matteo Berrettini → replaced by (France) Corentin Moutet
- (France) Arthur Cazaux → replaced by (France) Manuel Guinard
- (Bulgaria) Grigor Dimitrov → replaced by (France) Luca Van Assche
- (France) Ugo Humbert → replaced by (France) Titouan Droguet
- (Chile) Nicolás Jarry → replaced by (China) Bu Yunchaokete
- Karen Khachanov → replaced by (France) Hugo Gaston
- (United States) Sebastian Korda → (France) Arthur Rinderknech → replaced by (France) Théo Papamalamis
- (France) Giovanni Mpetshi Perricard → replaced by (India) Sumit Nagal
- (Denmark) Holger Rune → replaced by (France) Pierre-Hugues Herbert

== Doubles main-draw entrants ==
=== Seeds ===
| Country | Player | Country | Player | Rank^{1} | Seed |
|---|---|---|---|---|---|
| MEX | Santiago González | FRA | Édouard Roger-Vasselin | 46 | 1 |
| MON | Hugo Nys | POL | Jan Zieliński | 56 | 2 |
| BEL | Sander Gillé | BEL | Joran Vliegen | 64 | 3 |
| GBR | Julian Cash | GBR | Lloyd Glasspool | 73 | 4 |

- Rankings are as of 28 October 2024

=== Other entrants ===
The following pairs received wildcards into the doubles main draw:

- (Jamaica) Dustin Brown / (United States) Evan King
- (France) Arthur Cazaux / (France) Harold Mayot

=== Withdrawals ===
- (India) Yuki Bhambri / (France) Albano Olivetti → replaced by (France) Pierre-Hugues Herbert / (France) Albano Olivetti
- (India) Rohan Bopanna / (Australia) Matthew Ebden → replaced by (France) Manuel Guinard / (France) Grégoire Jacq
- (Belgium) Sander Gillé / (Belgium) Joran Vliegen → replaced by (India) Rithvik Choudary Bollipalli / (Portugal) Francisco Cabral
- (Argentina) Máximo González / (Argentina) Andrés Molteni → replaced by (Germany) Jakob Schnaitter / (Germany) Mark Wallner
- (Germany) Kevin Krawietz / (Germany) Tim Pütz → replaced by (Spain) Pedro Martínez / (Spain) Sergio Martos Gornés
