= 2021 Moselle Open =

- Date: 20–26 September
- Edition: 18th
- Category: ATP Tour 250 series
- Surface: Hard (indoor)
- Location: Metz, France
- Venue: Arènes de Metz

Champions

Singles
- (Poland) Hubert Hurkacz

Doubles
- (Poland) Hubert Hurkacz / (Poland) Jan Zieliński
- Moselle Open

The 2021 Moselle Open was a tennis tournament played on indoor hard courts. It was the 18th edition of the Moselle Open, and part of the ATP Tour 250 series of the 2021 ATP Tour. It took place at the Arènes de Metz from 20 September to 26 September 2021.

== Champions ==
=== Singles ===
- (Poland) Hubert Hurkacz def. (Spain) Pablo Carreño Busta 7–6^{(7–2)}, 6–3

=== Doubles ===
- (Poland) Hubert Hurkacz / (Poland) Jan Zieliński def. (Monaco) Hugo Nys / (France) Arthur Rinderknech, 7–5, 6–3

== Singles main-draw entrants ==
=== Seeds ===
Country	Player	Rank^{1}	Seed
POL	Hubert Hurkacz	13	1
ESP	Pablo Carreño Busta	16	2
FRA	Gaël Monfils	20	3
AUS	Alex de Minaur	21	4
ITA	Lorenzo Sonego	24	5
FRA	Ugo Humbert	26	6
RUS	Karen Khachanov	27	7
GEO	Nikoloz Basilashvili	35	8

- ^{1} Rankings are as of 13 September 2021

=== Other entrants ===
The following players received wildcards into the singles main draw:

- (France) Grégoire Barrère
- (United Kingdom) Andy Murray
- (France) Lucas Pouille

The following player was accepted directly into the main draw using a protected ranking:

- (France) Gilles Simon

The following player received entry as an alternate:

- (Sweden) Mikael Ymer

The following players received entry from the qualifying draw:

- (Germany) Peter Gojowczyk
- (France) Alexandre Müller
- (Denmark) Holger Rune
- (Canada) Brayden Schnur

The following players received entry as lucky losers:

- (France) Antoine Hoang
- (Germany) Philipp Kohlschreiber
- (Spain) Bernabé Zapata Miralles

=== Withdrawals ===
Before the tournament

- (Spain) Carlos Alcaraz → replaced by (Italy) Marco Cecchinato
- (France) Jérémy Chardy → replaced by (Sweden) Mikael Ymer
- (Belgium) David Goffin → replaced by (France) Arthur Rinderknech
- (Japan) Yoshihito Nishioka → replaced by (France) Antoine Hoang
- (Australia) Alexei Popyrin → replaced by (Spain) Bernabé Zapata Miralles
- (Italy) Jannik Sinner → replaced by (Germany) Philipp Kohlschreiber

== Doubles main-draw entrants ==
=== Seeds ===
Country	Player	Country	Player	Rank^{1}	Seed
FIN	Henri Kontinen	JPN	Ben McLachlan	81	1
BIH	Tomislav Brkić	SRB	Nikola Ćaćić	92	2
AUT	Oliver Marach	AUT	Philipp Oswald	95	3
AUS	Luke Saville	AUS	John-Patrick Smith	97	4

- Rankings are as of 13 September 2021

=== Other entrants ===
The following pairs received wildcards into the doubles main draw:

- (France) Dan Added / (France) Ugo Humbert
- (France) Grégoire Barrère / (France) Lucas Pouille

The following pair received entry as alternates:

- (United States) Hunter Reese / (Netherlands) Sem Verbeek

=== Withdrawals ===
Before the tournament

- (France) Jérémy Chardy / (Poland) Łukasz Kubot → replaced by (Poland) Szymon Walków / (Slovakia) Igor Zelenay
- (Uruguay) Ariel Behar / (Ecuador) Gonzalo Escobar → replaced by (United States) Marcos Giron / (France) Albano Olivetti
- (Spain) Alejandro Davidovich Fokina / (Spain) Pedro Martínez → replaced by (United States) Hunter Reese / (Netherlands) Sem Verbeek
- (Belgium) Sander Gillé / (Belgium) Joran Vliegen → replaced by (Croatia) Ivan Sabanov / (Croatia) Matej Sabanov
- (United Kingdom) Ken Skupski / (United Kingdom) Neal Skupski → replaced by (Australia) Matt Reid / (United Kingdom) Ken Skupski
