= 2022 Moselle Open =

- Date: 19–25 September
- Edition: 19th
- Category: ATP Tour 250 series
- Surface: Hard (indoor)
- Location: Metz, France
- Venue: Arènes de Metz

Champions

Singles
- (Italy) Lorenzo Sonego

Doubles
- (Monaco) Hugo Nys / (Poland) Jan Zieliński
- Moselle Open

The 2022 Moselle Open was a men's tennis tournament played on indoor hard courts. It was the 19th edition of the event, and it is part of the ATP Tour 250 Series of the 2022 ATP Tour. It took place at the Arènes de Metz from 19 September to 25 September 2022.

== Champions ==
=== Singles ===
- (Italy) Lorenzo Sonego def. (Kazakhstan) Alexander Bublik, 7–6^{(7–3)}, 6–2

=== Doubles ===
- (Monaco) Hugo Nys / (Poland) Jan Zieliński def. (United Kingdom) Lloyd Glasspool / (Finland) Harri Heliövaara, 7–6^{(7–5)}, 6–4

== Singles main-draw entrants ==
=== Seeds ===
Country	Player	Rank^{1}	Seed
	Daniil Medvedev	4	1
POL	Hubert Hurkacz	10	2
ITA	Lorenzo Musetti	30	3
DEN	Holger Rune	31	4
GEO	Nikoloz Basilashvili	36	5
	Aslan Karatsev	39	6
KAZ	Alexander Bublik	44	7
FRA	Adrian Mannarino	47	8

- ^{1} Rankings are as of 12 September 2022

=== Other entrants ===
The following players received wildcards into the singles main draw:

- (France) Richard Gasquet
- (France) Ugo Humbert
- (France) Gilles Simon

The following player was accepted directly into the main draw using a protected ranking:

- (Austria) Dominic Thiem

The following players received entry from the qualifying draw:

- (France) Grégoire Barrère
- (Belgium) Zizou Bergs
- (France) Evan Furness
- (Switzerland) Stan Wawrinka

=== Withdrawals ===
- (Spain) Pablo Carreño Busta → replaced by (Italy) Lorenzo Sonego
- (United States) Maxime Cressy → replaced by (Portugal) João Sousa
- (Spain) Alejandro Davidovich Fokina → replaced by (Czech Republic) Jiří Lehečka
- (Bulgaria) Grigor Dimitrov → replaced by (France) Arthur Rinderknech
- Ilya Ivashka → replaced by (Sweden) Mikael Ymer
- Karen Khachanov → replaced by (France) Adrian Mannarino
- (Serbia) Filip Krajinović → replaced by (Belgium) David Goffin
- (France) Gaël Monfils → replaced by (France) Hugo Gaston

== Doubles main-draw entrants ==
=== Seeds ===
Country	Player	Country	Player	Rank^{1}	Seed
GER	Tim Pütz	NZL	Michael Venus	15	1
GBR	Lloyd Glasspool	FIN	Harri Heliövaara	39	2
FRA	Nicolas Mahut	FRA	Édouard Roger-Vasselin	74	3
BRA	Rafael Matos	ESP	David Vega Hernández	76	4

- Rankings are as of 12 September 2022

=== Other entrants ===
The following pairs received wildcards into the doubles main draw:

- (France) Dan Added / (France) Albano Olivetti
- (France) Grégoire Barrère / (France) Quentin Halys

=== Withdrawals ===
- (Italy) Simone Bolelli / (Italy) Fabio Fognini → replaced by (Belgium) Sander Gillé / (Belgium) Joran Vliegen
