= 2026 Open Metz–Grand Est – Doubles =

Grand Est – Doubles
- 2026 Open Metz–Grand Est

Final
- Champions: (Spain) Íñigo Cervantes (Spain) Pedro Martínez
- Runners-up: (Ecuador) Gonzalo Escobar (India) Niki Kaliyanda Poonacha
- Score: 6–4, 6–4

Events
Singles	Doubles
- Open Metz–Grand Est

This was the first edition of the tournament.

Íñigo Cervantes and Pedro Martínez won the title after defeating Gonzalo Escobar and Niki Kaliyanda Poonacha 6–4, 6–4 in the final.

== Seeds ==
1. (Monaco) Romain Arneodo / (United Kingdom) Marcus Willis (semifinals)
2. (Belgium) Sander Gillé / (Netherlands) Sem Verbeek (semifinals)
3. (Ecuador) Gonzalo Escobar / (India) Niki Kaliyanda Poonacha (final)
4. (Mexico) Santiago González / (Germany) Hendrik Jebens (quarterfinals)

== Draw ==
Key

- Q = Qualifier
- WC = Wild card
- LL = Lucky loser
- Alt = Alternate
- ITF = ITF entry
- PR = Protected ranking
- SR = Special ranking
- SE = Special exempt
- JE = Junior exempt
- JR = Junior Accelerator Programme entrant
- CO = College Accelerator Programme entrant
- NG = Next Gen Accelerator Program entrant
- w/o = Walkover
- r = Retired
- d = Defaulted

First round
(Slovakia) M Karol (United Kingdom) J Paris	7^{8}	6^{3}	[12]
(Ukraine) D Molchanov (Austria) M Neuchrist	6^{6}	7^{7}	[10]
3	(Ecuador) G Escobar (India) N Kaliyanda Poonacha	6	6
WC	(Bulgaria) Alex Ganchev (Luxembourg) Sacha Maes	2	4
(Italy) Filippo Giovannini (Italy) Umberto Maria Giovannini	2	2
(Spain) M Mansilla Díez (Spain) D Vega Hernández	6	6
(Spain) Í Cervantes (Spain) P Martínez	7	3	[21]
(Czech Republic) F Duda (Croatia) A Kalender	5	6	[19]
WC	(France) Louis Binet (France) Antoine Vincent	1	5
4	(Mexico) S González (Germany) H Jebens	6	7
(Spain) S Martos Gornés (Poland) S Walków	7^{7}	7^{7}
(France) Robin Catry (France) Arthur Nagel	6^{5}	6^{1}
(Bulgaria) A Donski (Serbia) S Latinović	6	6^{5}	[5]
2	(Belgium) S Gillé (Netherlands) S Verbeek	3	7^{7}	[10]

Quarterfinals
1	(Monaco) R Arneodo (United Kingdom) M Willis	4	7^{7}	[10]
(Slovakia) M Karol (United Kingdom) J Paris	6	6^{3}	[7]
3	(Ecuador) G Escobar (India) N Kaliyanda Poonacha	6	6
(Spain) M Mansilla Díez (Spain) D Vega Hernández	4	2
(Spain) Í Cervantes (Spain) P Martínez	4	7	[12]
4	(Mexico) S González (Germany) H Jebens	6	5	[10]
(Spain) S Martos Gornés (Poland) S Walków	2	6	[8]
2	(Belgium) S Gillé (Netherlands) S Verbeek	6	3	[10]

Semifinals
1	(Monaco) R Arneodo (United Kingdom) M Willis	6	1	[6]
3	(Ecuador) G Escobar (India) N Kaliyanda Poonacha	3	6	[10]
(Spain) Í Cervantes (Spain) P Martínez	7^{8}	7^{7}
2	(Belgium) S Gillé (Netherlands) S Verbeek	6^{6}	6^{5}

Final
3	(Ecuador) G Escobar (India) N Kaliyanda Poonacha	4	4
(Spain) Í Cervantes (Spain) P Martínez	6	6
