= 2026 Open Metz–Grand Est =

- Date: 16–22 November
- Edition: 1st
- Surface: Hard (indoor)
- Location: Metz, France
- Venue: Les Arènes

Champions

Singles
- (Italy) Francesco Passaro

Doubles
- (Spain) Íñigo Cervantes / (Spain) Pedro Martínez
- Open Metz–Grand Est

The 2026 Open Metz–Grand Est was a professional tennis tournament played on hard courts. It was the first edition of the tournament which was part of the 2026 ATP Challenger Tour 125. It took place in Metz, France between 16 and 22 November 2026.

== Singles main-draw entrants ==
=== Seeds ===
Country	Player	Rank^{1}	Seed
~~GER~~	~~Daniel Altmaier~~	~~73~~	~~1~~
FRA	Kyrian Jacquet	85	2
GEO	Nikoloz Basilashvili	86	3
CRO	Dino Prižmić	89	4
FRA	Benjamin Bonzi	91	5
HUN	Zsombor Piros	99	6
FRA	Hugo Gaston	109	7
~~ESP~~	~~Pedro Martínez~~	~~124~~	~~8~~
CRO	Matej Dodig	136	9

- ^{1} Rankings are as of 9 November 2026.

=== Other entrants ===
The following players received wildcards into the singles main draw:

- (France) Pierre-Hugues Herbert
- (France) Harold Mayot
- (France) Arthur Nagel

The following player received entry into the singles main draw as a special exempt:

- (South Africa) Philip Henning

The following players received entry into the singles main draw through the Next Gen Accelerator programme:

- (France) Thomas Faurel
- (Czech Republic) Maxim Mrva

The following players received entry into the singles main draw as alternates:

- (Netherlands) Max Houkes
- Marat Sharipov

The following players received entry from the qualifying draw:

- (Czech Republic) Jonáš Forejtek
- (France) Antoine Ghibaudo
- (France) Hugo Grenier
- (France) Calvin Hemery
- (Italy) Filippo Moroni
- (Italy) Luca Nardi

The following players received entry as lucky losers:

- (Czech Republic) Matthew William Donald
- (Spain) Carlos Taberner

== Champions ==
=== Singles ===
- (Italy) Francesco Passaro def. (South Korea) Kwon Soon-woo 6–3, 7–6^{(7–2)}.

=== Doubles ===
- (Spain) Íñigo Cervantes / (Spain) Pedro Martínez def. (Ecuador) Gonzalo Escobar / (India) Niki Kaliyanda Poonacha 6–4, 6–4.
