= 2026 Open Metz–Grand Est – Singles =

Grand Est – Singles
- 2026 Open Metz–Grand Est

Final
- Champion: (Italy) Francesco Passaro
- Runner-up: (South Korea) Kwon Soon-woo
- Score: 6–3, 7–6^{(7–2)}

Events
| Singles | Doubles |
- Open Metz–Grand Est

This was the first edition of the tournament.

Francesco Passaro won the title after defeating Kwon Soon-woo 6–3, 7–6^{(7–2)} in the final.

== Seeds ==
1. (Germany) Daniel Altmaier (withdrew)
2. (France) Kyrian Jacquet (second round)
3. (Georgia (country)) Nikoloz Basilashvili (second round, retired)
4. (Croatia) Dino Prižmić (quarterfinals)
5. (France) Benjamin Bonzi (first round)
6. (Hungary) Zsombor Piros (second round)
7. (France) Hugo Gaston (second round)
8. (Spain) Pedro Martínez (withdrew)
9. (Croatia) Matej Dodig (first round)

== Draw ==
Key

- Q = Qualifier
- WC = Wild card
- LL = Lucky loser
- Alt = Alternate
- ITF = ITF entry
- PR = Protected ranking
- SR = Special ranking
- SE = Special exempt
- JE = Junior exempt
- JR = Junior Accelerator Programme entrant
- CO = College Accelerator Programme entrant
- NG = Next Gen Accelerator Program entrant
- w/o = Walkover
- r = Retired
- d = Defaulted

=== Finals ===
Semifinals
WC | (France) Harold Mayot | 1 | 6^{2}
(Italy) Francesco Passaro | 6 | 7^{7}
(South Korea) Kwon Soon-woo | 3 | 6 | 7^{8}
(France) Sascha Gueymard Wayenburg | 6 | 3 | 6^{6}

Final
(Italy) Francesco Passaro | 6 | 7^{7}
(South Korea) Kwon Soon-woo | 3 | 6^{2}

=== Top half ===
First round
9 | (Croatia) M Dodig | 4 | 4
(France) C Tabur | 6 | 6
Alt | M Sharipov | 4 | 4
(Spain) I Montes de la Torre | 6 | 6
Q | (France) H Grenier | 4 | 6 | 1
WC | (France) H Mayot | 6 | 3 | 6
SE | (South Africa) P Henning | 3 | 5
7 | (France) H Gaston | 6 | 7
3 | (Georgia (country)) N Basilashvili | 7^{7} | 6
Alt | (Netherlands) M Houkes | 6^{5} | 4
Q | (France) C Hemery | 7^{8} | 6^{5} | 4
(Italy) F Passaro | 6^{6} | 7^{7} | 6
Q | (Czech Republic) J Forejtek | 3 | 2
WC | (France) P-H Herbert | 6 | 6
(France) A Müller | 6 | 4 | 2
6 | (Hungary) Z Piros | 2 | 6 | 6

Second round
(France) C Tabur | 3 | 3
(Spain) I Montes de la Torre | 6 | 6
WC | (France) H Mayot | 7 | 4 | 7^{7}
7 | (France) H Gaston | 5 | 6 | 6^{4}
3 | (Georgia (country)) N Basilashvili | 2^{r}
(Italy) F Passaro | 3
WC | (France) P-H Herbert | 6 | 4 | 7^{7}
6 | (Hungary) Z Piros | 4 | 6 | 6^{4}

Quarterfinals
(Spain) I Montes de la Torre | 1 | 4
WC | (France) H Mayot | 6 | 6
(Italy) F Passaro | 7 | 7^{7}
WC | (France) P-H Herbert | 5 | 6^{3}

Semifinals
WC | (France) H Mayot | 1 | 6^{2}
(Italy) F Passaro | 6 | 7^{7}

=== Bottom half ===
First round
LL | (Spain) C Taberner | 3 | 6 | 4
LL | (Czech Republic) Matthew William Donald | 6 | 2 | 6
(Ukraine) V Sachko | 3 | 4
(South Korea) S-w Kwon | 6 | 6
Q | (France) A Ghibaudo | 3 | 4
Q | (Italy) F Moroni | 6 | 6
(Germany) D Dedura | 3 | 2
4 | (Croatia) D Prižmić | 6 | 6
5 | (France) B Bonzi | 6 | 3 | 4
(France) S Gueymard Wayenburg | 4 | 6 | 6
WC | (France) Arthur Nagel | 6 | 4 | 6
(Serbia) D Lajović | 4 | 6 | 2
Q | (Italy) L Nardi | 7 | 6
NG | (France) T Faurel | 5 | 1
NG | (Czech Republic) M Mrva | 1 | 7^{7} | 3
2 | (France) K Jacquet | 6 | 6^{5} | 6

Second round
LL | (Czech Republic) MW Donald | 4 | 6^{2}
(South Korea) S-w Kwon | 6 | 7^{7}
Q | (Italy) F Moroni | 1 | 3
4 | (Croatia) D Prižmić | 6 | 6
(France) S Gueymard Wayenburg | 6 | 7^{7}
WC | (France) A Nagel | 2 | 6^{3}
Q | (Italy) L Nardi | 6 | 6
2 | (France) K Jacquet | 2 | 3

Quarterfinals
(South Korea) S-w Kwon | 7^{7} | 7^{7}
4 | (Croatia) D Prižmić | 6^{5} | 6^{5}
(France) S Gueymard Wayenburg | 6 | 6
Q | (Italy) L Nardi | 2 | 3

Semifinals
(South Korea) S-w Kwon | 3 | 6 | 7^{8}
(France) S Gueymard Wayenburg | 6 | 3 | 6^{6}
