= 2022 Moselle Open – Singles =

Singles
- 2022 Moselle Open

Final
- Champion: (Italy) Lorenzo Sonego
- Runner-up: (Kazakhstan) Alexander Bublik
- Score: 7–6^{(7–3)}, 6–2

Details
- Draw: 28 (4 Q / 3 WC )
- Seeds: 8

Events
Singles	Doubles
← 2021 ·	Moselle Open	· 2023 →

Lorenzo Sonego defeated Alexander Bublik in the final, 7–6^{(7–3)}, 6–2 to win the singles tennis title at the 2022 Moselle Open.

Hubert Hurkacz was the defending champion, but lost in the semifinals to Sonego.

== Seeds ==
The top four seeds received a bye into the second round.

1. Daniil Medvedev (second round)
2. (Poland) Hubert Hurkacz (semifinals)
3. (Italy) Lorenzo Musetti (second round)
4. (Denmark) Holger Rune (quarterfinals)
5. (Georgia (country)) Nikoloz Basilashvili (second round)
6. Aslan Karatsev (first round)
7. (Kazakhstan) Alexander Bublik (final)
8. (France) Adrian Mannarino (first round)

== Draw ==
=== Key ===
- Q = Qualifier
- WC = Wild card
- LL = Lucky loser
- Alt = Alternate
- SE = Special exempt
- PR = Protected ranking
- ITF = ITF entry
- JE = Junior exempt
- w/o = Walkover
- r = Retired
- d = Defaulted
- SR = Special ranking

=== Finals ===
Semifinals
Q	(Switzerland) Stan Wawrinka	1^{r}
7	(Kazakhstan) Alexander Bublik	2
(Italy) Lorenzo Sonego	7^{7}	6
2	(Poland) Hubert Hurkacz	6^{5}	4

Final
7	(Kazakhstan) Alexander Bublik	6^{3}	2
(Italy) Lorenzo Sonego	7^{7}	6

=== Top half ===
First round
Q	(Switzerland) S Wawrinka	7^{7}	6
(Portugal) J Sousa	6^{1}	2
Q	(France) G Barrère	7^{7}	7
(Germany) O Otte	6^{3}	5
(Sweden) M Ymer	7	6
8	(France) A Mannarino	5	0
WC	(France) U Humbert	2	6	1
(France) B Bonzi	6	2	6
(Finland) E Ruusuvuori	6	6
(Czech Republic) J Lehečka	4	4
Q	(France) E Furness	7	4	6^{5}
7	(Kazakhstan) A Bublik	5	6	7^{7}

Second round
1	D Medvedev	4	7^{9}	3
Q	(Switzerland) S Wawrinka	6	6^{7}	6
Q	(France) G Barrère	4	3
(Sweden) M Ymer	6	6
4	(Denmark) H Rune	6	4
(France) B Bonzi	4	1^{r}
(Finland) E Ruusuvuori	7^{7}	4	3
7	(Kazakhstan) A Bublik	6^{4}	6	6

Quarterfinals
Q	(Switzerland) S Wawrinka	6	4	7^{7}
(Sweden) M Ymer	4	6	6^{5}
4	(Denmark) H Rune	3	7	4
7	(Kazakhstan) A Bublik	6	5	6

Semifinals
Q	(Switzerland) S Wawrinka	1^{r}
7	(Kazakhstan) A Bublik	2

=== Bottom half ===
First round
6	A Karatsev	5	3
(Italy) L Sonego	7	6
WC	(France) G Simon	6	6
(Belgium) D Goffin	3	3
(France) H Gaston	3	6^{2}
(United States) S Korda	6	7^{7}
5	(Georgia (country)) N Basilashvili	4	1
Q	(Belgium) Z Bergs	6	2^{r}
(Spain) J Munar	2	6	5
(France) A Rinderknech	6	2	7
WC	(France) R Gasquet	3	6^{3}
PR	(Austria) D Thiem	6	7^{7}

Second round
(Italy) L Sonego	7^{7}	6
WC	(France) G Simon	6^{2}	4
(United States) S Korda	6	7^{8}
3	(Italy) L Musetti	3	6^{6}
5	(Georgia (country)) N Basilashvili	6^{11}	3
(France) A Rinderknech	7^{13}	6
PR	(Austria) D Thiem	3	4
2	(Poland) H Hurkacz	6	6

Quarterfinals
(Italy) L Sonego	6	6
(United States) S Korda	4	4
(France) A Rinderknech	3	2
2	(Poland) H Hurkacz	6	6

Semifinals
(Italy) L Sonego	7^{7}	6
2	(Poland) H Hurkacz	6^{5}	4

== Qualifying ==
=== Seeds ===
1. (Serbia) Laslo Đere (first round)
2. (France) Quentin Halys (qualifying competition)
3. (Hungary) Márton Fucsovics (qualifying competition)
4. (Belgium) Zizou Bergs (qualified)
5. (Austria) Jurij Rodionov (first round)
6. (Italy) Luca Nardi (first round)
7. (France) Geoffrey Blancaneaux (first round)
8. (Netherlands) Gijs Brouwer (qualifying competition)

=== Qualifiers ===
1. (Switzerland) Stan Wawrinka
2. (France) Evan Furness
3. (France) Grégoire Barrère
4. (Belgium) Zizou Bergs

=== Qualifying draw ===
==== First qualifier ====
First round
1	(Serbia) Laslo Đere	4	3
WC	(Switzerland) Stan Wawrinka	6	6
(Hungary) Zsombor Piros	4	7	6
6	(Italy) Luca Nardi	6	5	2

Qualifying competition
WC	(Switzerland) Stan Wawrinka	6^{4}	6	6
(Hungary) Zsombor Piros	7^{7}	2	0

==== Second qualifier ====
First round
2	(France) Quentin Halys	7^{7}	7^{7}
(France) Antoine Escoffier	6^{5}	6^{3}
Alt	(France) Evan Furness	6^{4}	7	6
7	(France) Geoffrey Blancaneaux	7^{7}	5	2

Qualifying competition
2	(France) Quentin Halys	3	4
Alt	(France) Evan Furness	6	6

==== Third qualifier ====
First round
3	(Hungary) Márton Fucsovics	6	6
WC	(France) Harold Mayot	4	4
(France) Grégoire Barrère	6	6^{4}	6
5	(Austria) Jurij Rodionov	4	7^{7}	2

Qualifying competition
3	(Hungary) Márton Fucsovics	5	1
(France) Grégoire Barrère	7	6

==== Fourth qualifier ====
First round
4	(Belgium) Zizou Bergs	7^{7}	6
(Germany) Daniel Masur	6^{3}	0
(Germany) Peter Gojowczyk	3	4
8	(Netherlands) Gijs Brouwer	6	6

Qualifying competition
4	(Belgium) Zizou Bergs	6	3	6
8	(Netherlands) Gijs Brouwer	3	6	3
