= 2024 Moselle Open – Doubles =

Doubles
- 2024 Moselle Open

Final
- Champions: (Netherlands) Sander Arends (United Kingdom) Luke Johnson
- Runners-up: (France) Pierre-Hugues Herbert (France) Albano Olivetti
- Score: 6–4, 3–6, [10–3]

Events
Singles	Doubles
← 2023 ·	Moselle Open	· 2025 →

Sander Arends and Luke Johnson defeated Pierre-Hugues Herbert and Albano Olivetti 6–4, 3–6, [10–3] in the final to win the doubles tennis title at the 2024 Moselle Open.

Hugo Nys and Jan Zieliński were the two-time defending champions, but lost in the quarterfinals to Arends and Johnson.

This tournament marked the final professional appearance of Dustin Brown, who announced that he will retire at the end of the season. He lost in the first round to Herbert and Olivetti.

== Seeds ==
1. (Mexico) Santiago González / (France) Édouard Roger-Vasselin (quarterfinals)
2. (Monaco) Hugo Nys / (Poland) Jan Zieliński (quarterfinals)
3. (United Kingdom) Julian Cash / (United Kingdom) Lloyd Glasspool (semifinals)
4. (Austria) Alexander Erler / (Germany) Andreas Mies (first round)

== Draw ==
Key

- Q = Qualifier
- WC = Wild card
- LL = Lucky loser
- Alt = Alternate
- ITF = ITF entry
- PR = Protected ranking
- SR = Special ranking
- SE = Special exempt
- JE = Junior exempt
- JR = Junior Accelerator Programme entrant
- CO = College Accelerator Programme entrant
- NG = Next Gen Accelerator Program entrant
- w/o = Walkover
- r = Retired
- d = Defaulted

=== Draw ===
First round
1	(Mexico) S González (France) É Roger-Vasselin	6	6
(Germany) C Frantzen (Germany) H Jebens	4	4
WC	(France) A Cazaux (France) H Mayot
(India) RC Bollipalli (Portugal) F Cabral	w/o
4	(Austria) A Erler (Germany) A Mies	4	6^{5}
(France) M Guinard (France) G Jacq	6	7^{7}
(France) P-H Herbert (France) A Olivetti	6	7^{10}
WC	(Jamaica) D Brown (United States) E King	3	6^{8}
(Netherlands) M Middelkoop (Netherlands) J-J Rojer	6^{6}	6	[10]
(Argentina) G Andreozzi (India) S Balaji	7^{8}	2	[7]
(Spain) P Martínez (Spain) S Martos Gornés	5	3
3	(United Kingdom) J Cash (United Kingdom) L Glasspool	7	6
(Netherlands) S Arends (United Kingdom) L Johnson	6	6^{4}	[10]
(Germany) J Schnaitter (Germany) M Wallner	2	7^{7}	[5]
(Netherlands) R Haase (Austria) L Miedler	7^{7}	6^{5}	[5]
2	(Monaco) H Nys (Poland) J Zieliński	6^{4}	7^{7}	[10]

Quarterfinals
1	(Mexico) S González (France) É Roger-Vasselin	6^{1}	4
(India) RC Bollipalli (Portugal) F Cabral	7^{7}	6
(France) M Guinard (France) G Jacq	3	4
(France) P-H Herbert (France) A Olivetti	6	6
(Netherlands) M Middelkoop (Netherlands) J-J Rojer	1	4
3	(United Kingdom) J Cash (United Kingdom) L Glasspool	6	6
(Netherlands) S Arends (United Kingdom) L Johnson	6	3	[10]
2	(Monaco) H Nys (Poland) J Zieliński	3	6	[6]

Semifinals
(India) RC Bollipalli (Portugal) F Cabral	3	6^{4}
(France) P-H Herbert (France) A Olivetti	6	7^{7}
3	(United Kingdom) J Cash (United Kingdom) L Glasspool	7^{9}	4	[5]
(Netherlands) S Arends (United Kingdom) L Johnson	6^{7}	6	[10]

Final
(France) P-H Herbert (France) A Olivetti	4	6	[3]
(Netherlands) S Arends (United Kingdom) L Johnson	6	3	[10]
