= 2022 Moselle Open – Doubles =

Doubles
- 2022 Moselle Open

Final
- Champions: (Monaco) Hugo Nys (Poland) Jan Zieliński
- Runners-up: (United Kingdom) Lloyd Glasspool (Finland) Harri Heliövaara
- Score: 7–6^{(7–5)}, 6–4

Events
Singles	Doubles
← 2021 ·	Moselle Open	· 2023 →

Defending champion Jan Zieliński and his partner Hugo Nys defeated Lloyd Glasspool and Harri Heliövaara in the final, 7–6^{(7–5)}, 6–4 to win the doubles tennis title at the 2022 Moselle Open.

Hubert Hurkacz and Zieliński were the reigning champions, but Hurkacz did not participate this year.

== Seeds ==
1. (Germany) Tim Pütz / (New Zealand) Michael Venus (first round)
2. (United Kingdom) Lloyd Glasspool / (Finland) Harri Heliövaara (final)
3. (France) Nicolas Mahut / (France) Édouard Roger-Vasselin (semifinals, retired)
4. (Brazil) Rafael Matos / (Spain) David Vega Hernández (quarterfinals)

== Draw ==
=== Key ===
- Q = Qualifier
- WC = Wild card
- LL = Lucky loser
- Alt = Alternate
- SE = Special exempt
- PR = Protected ranking
- ITF = ITF entry
- JE = Junior exempt
- w/o = Walkover
- r = Retired
- d = Defaulted
- SR = Special ranking

=== Draw ===
First round
1	(Germany) T Pütz (New Zealand) M Venus	2	4
WC	(France) G Barrère (France) Q Halys	6	6
(Bosnia and Herzegovina) T Brkić (Serbia) N Ćaćić	5	5
(France) F Martin (Pakistan) A-u-H Qureshi	7	7
4	(Brazil) R Matos (Spain) D Vega Hernández	7	6
PR	(Netherlands) M Middelkoop (Croatia) F Škugor	5	4
(Monaco) H Nys (Poland) J Zieliński	6	5	[10]
(Portugal) F Cabral (United Kingdom) J Murray	2	7	[5]
(Netherlands) R Haase (Austria) P Oswald	6^{6}	3
(Kazakhstan) A Bublik (Italy) L Musetti	7^{8}	6
(France) S Doumbia (France) F Reboul	4	4
3	(France) N Mahut (France) É Roger-Vasselin	6	6
WC	(France) D Added (France) A Olivetti	7^{7}	7^{7}
(Uruguay) A Behar (Argentina) M González	6^{0}	6^{4}
(Belgium) S Gillé (Belgium) J Vliegen	5	4
2	(United Kingdom) L Glasspool (Finland) H Heliövaara	7	6

Quarterfinals
WC	(France) G Barrère (France) Q Halys	7^{7}	7
(France) F Martin (Pakistan) A-u-H Qureshi	6^{4}	5
4	(Brazil) R Matos (Spain) D Vega Hernández	2	1
(Monaco) H Nys (Poland) J Zieliński	6	6
(Kazakhstan) A Bublik (Italy) L Musetti
3	(France) N Mahut (France) É Roger-Vasselin	w/o
WC	(France) D Added (France) A Olivetti	6^{2}	4
2	(United Kingdom) L Glasspool (Finland) H Heliövaara	7^{7}	6

Semifinals
WC	(France) G Barrère (France) Q Halys	1	7^{11}	[9]
(Monaco) H Nys (Poland) J Zieliński	6	6^{9}	[11]
3	(France) N Mahut (France) É Roger-Vasselin	4	0^{r}
2	(United Kingdom) L Glasspool (Finland) H Heliövaara	6	0

Final
(Monaco) H Nys (Poland) J Zieliński	7^{7}	6
2	(United Kingdom) L Glasspool (Finland) H Heliövaara	6^{5}	4
