= 2024 Moselle Open – Singles =

Singles
- 2024 Moselle Open

Final
- Champion: (France) Benjamin Bonzi
- Runner-up: (United Kingdom) Cameron Norrie
- Score: 7–6^{(8–6)}, 6–4

Details
- Draw: 28 (4Q, 3WC)
- Seeds: 8

Events
Singles	Doubles
← 2023 ·	Moselle Open	· 2025 →

Benjamin Bonzi defeated Cameron Norrie in the final, 7–6^{(8–6)}, 6–4 to win the singles tennis title at the 2024 Moselle Open. It was his first ATP Tour title.

Ugo Humbert was the reigning champion, but withdrew from the tournament.

== Seeds ==
The top four seeds received a bye into the second round.

1. Andrey Rublev (quarterfinals, withdrew)
2. (Norway) Casper Ruud (second round)
3. (Bulgaria) Grigor Dimitrov (withdrew)
4. (Denmark) Holger Rune (withdrew)
5. (France) Ugo Humbert (withdrew)
6. (Spain) Pedro Martínez (first round)
7. (Germany) Jan-Lennard Struff (second round)
8. (United States) Alex Michelsen (semifinals)

== Draw ==
Key

- Q = Qualifier
- WC = Wild card
- LL = Lucky loser
- Alt = Alternate
- ITF = ITF entry
- PR = Protected ranking
- SR = Special ranking
- SE = Special exempt
- JE = Junior exempt
- JR = Junior Accelerator Programme entrant
- CO = College Accelerator Programme entrant
- NG = Next Gen Accelerator Program entrant
- w/o = Walkover
- r = Retired
- d = Defaulted

=== Finals ===
Semifinals
(France) Corentin Moutet	2	6^{5}
(United Kingdom) Cameron Norrie	6	7^{7}
8	(United States) Alex Michelsen	6	0	5
Q	(France) Benjamin Bonzi	4	6	7

Final
(United Kingdom) Cameron Norrie	6^{6}	4
Q	(France) Benjamin Bonzi	7^{8}	6

=== Top half ===
First round
LL	(France) G Barrère	4	5
(Italy) L Sonego	6	7
(India) S Nagal	5	0^{r}
(France) C Moutet	7	4
(Kazakhstan) A Shevchenko	6	4	4
7	(Germany) J-L Struff	3	6	6
(United Kingdom) C Norrie	3	6	6
(Spain) R Carballés Baena	6	4	3
LL	(France) M Guinard	4	4
(Belgium) Z Bergs	6	6
(France) H Gaston	7^{8}	4	6
LL	(France) T Droguet	6^{6}	6	3

Second round
1	A Rublev	7^{7}	7
(Italy) L Sonego	6^{3}	5
(France) C Moutet	7^{7}	5	6
7	(Germany) J-L Struff	6^{2}	7	3
LL	(France) L Van Assche	3	6	1
(United Kingdom) C Norrie	6	3	6
(Belgium) Z Bergs	6	7
(France) H Gaston	4	5

Quarterfinals
1	A Rublev
(France) C Moutet	w/o
(United Kingdom) C Norrie	6	6^{6}	6
(Belgium) Z Bergs	3	7^{8}	1

Semifinals
(France) C Moutet	2	6^{5}
(United Kingdom) C Norrie	6	7^{7}

=== Bottom half ===
First round
8	(United States) A Michelsen	6	6
WC	(France) H Mayot	3	1
WC	(France) R Gasquet	4	6	7^{8}
(Brazil) T Monteiro	6	4	6^{6}
(France) A Mannarino	6^{4}	4
(China) Y Bu	7^{7}	6
6	(Spain) P Martínez	3	6	6^{4}
LL	(France) P-H Herbert	6	3	7^{7}
Q	(France) Q Halys	6	6
LL	(France) T Papamalamis	3	1
(Spain) R Bautista Agut	6^{3}	3
Q	(France) B Bonzi	7^{7}	6

Second round
8	(United States) A Michelsen	6^{4}	7^{7}	7^{10}
WC	(France) R Gasquet	7^{7}	6^{3}	6^{8}
(China) Y Bu	6	7^{7}
Q	(Netherlands) J de Jong	4	6^{1}
LL	(France) P-H Herbert	1	6	4
Q	(France) Q Halys	6	4	6
Q	(France) B Bonzi	6	6
2	(Norway) C Ruud	4	4

Quarterfinals
8	(United States) A Michelsen	6^{6}	6	6
(China) Y Bu	7^{8}	2	4
Q	(France) Q Halys	3	6^{1}
Q	(France) B Bonzi	6	7^{7}

Semifinals
8	(United States) A Michelsen	6	0	5
Q	(France) B Bonzi	4	6	7

== Qualifying ==
=== Seeds ===
1. (France) Arthur Cazaux (qualified)
2. (France) Quentin Halys (qualified)
3. (Switzerland) Alexander Ritschard (first round)
4. (Netherlands) Jesper de Jong (qualified)
5. (United Kingdom) Billy Harris (first round)
6. (France) Luca Van Assche (first round, lucky loser)
7. (France) Pierre-Hugues Herbert (qualifying competition, lucky loser)
8. (France) Benjamin Bonzi (qualified)

=== Qualifiers ===
1. (France) Arthur Cazaux (withdrew)
2. (France) Quentin Halys
3. (France) Benjamin Bonzi
4. (Netherlands) Jesper de Jong

=== Lucky losers ===
1. (France) Pierre-Hugues Herbert
2. (France) Grégoire Barrère
3. (France) Titouan Droguet
4. (France) Manuel Guinard
5. (France) Théo Papamalamis
6. (France) Luca Van Assche

=== Qualifying draw ===
==== First qualifier ====
First round
1	(France) Arthur Cazaux	6	6^{7}	6
(France) Ugo Blanchet	2	7^{9}	2
(France) Robin Bertrand	6	2	4
7	(France) Pierre-Hugues Herbert	4	6	6

Qualifying competition
1	(France) Arthur Cazaux	6	4	6
7	(France) Pierre-Hugues Herbert	0	6	3

==== Second qualifier ====
First round
2	(France) Quentin Halys	6	6
(France) Matteo Martineau	3	4
(France) Grégoire Barrère	6	6
6	(France) Luca Van Assche	3	4

Qualifying competition
2	(France) Quentin Halys	6	6
(France) Grégoire Barrère	4	2

==== Third qualifier ====
First round
3	(Switzerland) Alexander Ritschard	2	2
(France) Manuel Guinard	6	6
(Switzerland) Marc-Andrea Hüsler	1	6^{4}
8	(France) Benjamin Bonzi	6	7^{7}

Qualifying competition
(France) Manuel Guinard	2	3
8	(France) Benjamin Bonzi	6	6

==== Fourth qualifier ====
First round
4	(Netherlands) Jesper de Jong	6	6
WC	(France) Théo Papamalamis	2	3
WC	(France) Titouan Droguet	6	3	6
5	(United Kingdom) Billy Harris	4	6	4

Qualifying competition
4	(Netherlands) Jesper de Jong	6	4	7^{7}
WC	(France) Titouan Droguet	2	6	6^{5}
