= 2021 Moselle Open – Singles =

Singles
- 2021 Moselle Open

Final
- Champion: (Poland) Hubert Hurkacz
- Runner-up: (Spain) Pablo Carreño Busta
- Score: 7–6^{(7–2)}, 6–3

Details
- Draw: 28 (4 Q / 3 WC )
- Seeds: 8

Events
Singles	Doubles
← 2019 ·	Moselle Open	· 2022 →

Jo-Wilfried Tsonga was the reigning champion from when the tournament was last held in 2019, but chose not to participate this year.

Hubert Hurkacz won the title, defeating Pablo Carreño Busta in the final, 7–6^{(7–2)}, 6–3.

== Seeds ==
The top four seeds received a bye into the second round.

1. (Poland) Hubert Hurkacz (champion)
2. (Spain) Pablo Carreño Busta (final)
3. (France) Gaël Monfils (semifinals)
4. (Australia) Alex de Minaur (second round)
5. (Italy) Lorenzo Sonego (second round)
6. (France) Ugo Humbert (first round)
7. (Russia) Karen Khachanov (second round)
8. (Georgia (country)) Nikoloz Basilashvili (quarterfinals)

== Draw ==
=== Key ===
- Q = Qualifier
- WC = Wild card
- LL = Lucky loser
- Alt = Alternate
- SE = Special exempt
- PR = Protected ranking
- ITF = ITF entry
- JE = Junior exempt
- w/o = Walkover
- r = Retired
- d = Defaulted
- SR = Special ranking

=== Finals ===
Semifinals
1	(Poland) Hubert Hurkacz	6	7^{7}
Q	(Germany) Peter Gojowczyk	4	6^{4}
3	(France) Gaël Monfils	5	6^{8}
2	(Spain) Pablo Carreño Busta	7	7^{10}

Final
1	(Poland) Hubert Hurkacz	7^{7}	6
2	(Spain) Pablo Carreño Busta	6^{2}	3

=== Top half ===
First round
WC	(France) L Pouille	3	6	6
Q	(Canada) B Schnur	6	4	4
WC	(France) G Barrère	3	4
(Canada) V Pospisil	6	6
WC	(United Kingdom) A Murray	4	6	6
6	(France) U Humbert	6	3	2
(France) A Rinderknech	6	6^{3}	4
(United States) M Giron	3	7^{7}	6
LL	(France) A Hoang	2	6	4
Q	(Germany) P Gojowczyk	6	3	6
Q	(France) A Müller	6	1	3
7	(Russia) K Khachanov	4	6	6

Second round
1	(Poland) H Hurkacz	6	6
WC	(France) L Pouille	2	3
(Canada) V Pospisil	3	3
WC	(United Kingdom) A Murray	6	6
4	(Australia) A de Minaur	5	6^{5}
(United States) M Giron	7	7^{7}
Q	(Germany) P Gojowczyk	6	7^{7}
7	(Russia) K Khachanov	3	6^{2}

Quarterfinals
1	(Poland) H Hurkacz	7^{7}	6
WC	(United Kingdom) A Murray	6^{4}	3
(United States) M Giron	6	1	3
Q	(Germany) P Gojowczyk	3	6	6

Semifinals
1	(Poland) H Hurkacz	6	7^{7}
Q	(Germany) P Gojowczyk	4	6^{4}

=== Bottom half ===
First round
8	(Georgia (country)) N Basilashvili	6	7^{7}
(Italy) G Mager	3	6^{5}
(Spain) A Davidovich Fokina	6^{4}	7^{7}	6
PR	(France) G Simon	7^{7}	6^{2}	2
LL	(Germany) P Kohlschreiber	7^{7}	6
(Italy) M Cecchinato	6^{3}	3
5	(Italy) L Sonego	6	6
(Hungary) M Fucsovics	3	2
Q	(Denmark) H Rune	6	6
LL	(Spain) B Zapata Miralles	0	0
Alt	(Sweden) M Ymer	7	6
(Germany) J-L Struff	5	3

Second round
8	(Georgia (country)) N Basilashvili	0	6	7^{7}
(Spain) A Davidovich Fokina	6	4	6^{4}
LL	(Germany) P Kohlschreiber	6^{2}	4
3	(France) G Monfils	7^{7}	6
5	(Italy) L Sonego	7^{8}	4	4
Q	(Denmark) H Rune	6^{6}	6	6
Alt	(Sweden) M Ymer	5	2
2	(Spain) P Carreño Busta	7	6

Quarterfinals
8	(Georgia (country)) N Basilashvili	3	3
3	(France) G Monfils	6	6
Q	(Denmark) H Rune	4	6	4
2	(Spain) P Carreño Busta	6	3	6

Semifinals
3	(France) G Monfils	5	6^{8}
2	(Spain) P Carreño Busta	7	7^{10}

== Qualifying ==
=== Seeds ===
1. (Sweden) Mikael Ymer (moved to the main draw)
2. (Germany) Peter Gojowczyk (qualified)
3. (Germany) Philipp Kohlschreiber (qualifying competition, lucky loser)
4. (Spain) Bernabé Zapata Miralles (qualifying competition, lucky loser)
5. (Denmark) Holger Rune (qualified)
6. (France) Antoine Hoang (qualifying competition, lucky loser)
7. (Italy) Federico Gaio (first round)
8. (France) Quentin Halys (first round)

=== Qualifiers ===
1. (Canada) Brayden Schnur
2. (Germany) Peter Gojowczyk
3. (Denmark) Holger Rune
4. (France) Alexandre Müller

=== Lucky losers ===
1. (Germany) Philipp Kohlschreiber
2. (Spain) Bernabé Zapata Miralles
3. (France) Antoine Hoang

=== Qualifying draw ===
==== First qualifier ====
First round
Alt	(Canada) Brayden Schnur	3	6	6
(Italy) Roberto Marcora	6	4	2
WC	(France) Harold Mayot	6^{4}	7	6
7	(Italy) Federico Gaio	7^{7}	5	4

Qualifying competition
Alt	(Canada) Brayden Schnur	6	6
WC	(France) Harold Mayot	4	1

==== Second qualifier ====
First round
2	(Germany) Peter Gojowczyk	6	6
WC	(France) Luca Van Assche	2	3
PR	(Germany) Yannick Maden	2	4
6	(France) Antoine Hoang	6	6

Qualifying competition
2	(Germany) Peter Gojowczyk	6	4	6
6	(France) Antoine Hoang	4	6	2

==== Third qualifier ====
First round
3	(Germany) Philipp Kohlschreiber	7	6
(Uzbekistan) Denis Istomin	5	3
(Italy) Thomas Fabbiano	6	3	4
5	(Denmark) Holger Rune	3	6	6

Qualifying competition
3	(Germany) Philipp Kohlschreiber	7	3	5
5	(Denmark) Holger Rune	5	6	7

==== Fourth qualifier ====
First round
4	(Spain) Bernabé Zapata Miralles	3	6	6
(Chile) Alejandro Tabilo	6	4	1
(France) Alexandre Müller	3	6	6
8	(France) Quentin Halys	6	3	4

Qualifying competition
4	(Spain) Bernabé Zapata Miralles	6^{1}	6	0
(France) Alexandre Müller	7^{7}	4	6
