= 2021 Moselle Open – Doubles =

Doubles
- 2021 Moselle Open

Final
- Champions: (Poland) Hubert Hurkacz (Poland) Jan Zieliński
- Runners-up: (Monaco) Hugo Nys (France) Arthur Rinderknech
- Score: 7–5, 6–3

Events
Singles	Doubles
← 2019 ·	Moselle Open	· 2022 →

Robert Lindstedt and Jan-Lennard Struff were the reigning champions from when the tournament was last held in 2019, but chose not to participate this year.

Hubert Hurkacz and Jan Zieliński won the title, defeating Hugo Nys and Arthur Rinderknech in the final, 7–5, 6–3.

== Seeds ==
1. (Finland) Henri Kontinen / (Japan) Ben McLachlan (semifinals)
2. (Bosnia and Herzegovina) Tomislav Brkić / (Serbia) Nikola Ćaćić (semifinals)
3. (Austria) Oliver Marach / (Austria) Philipp Oswald (quarterfinals)
4. (Australia) Luke Saville / (Australia) John-Patrick Smith (first round)

== Draw ==
=== Key ===
- Q = Qualifier
- WC = Wild card
- LL = Lucky loser
- Alt = Alternate
- SE = Special exempt
- PR = Protected ranking
- ITF = ITF entry
- JE = Junior exempt
- w/o = Walkover
- r = Retired
- d = Defaulted
- SR = Special ranking

=== Draw ===
First round
1	(Finland) H Kontinen (Japan) B McLachlan	7^{7}	7
(Australia) M Reid (United Kingdom) K Skupski	6^{3}	5
(Australia) A de Minaur (Spain) D Vega Hernández	3	6	[5]
WC	(France) G Barrère (France) L Pouille	6	3	[10]
3	(Austria) O Marach (Austria) P Oswald	6	6
(France) N Mahut (Canada) V Pospisil	4	3
(Poland) H Hurkacz (Poland) J Zieliński	6	6
(Poland) S Walków (Slovakia) I Zelenay	3	3
(Croatia) I Sabanov (Croatia) M Sabanov	3	6	[10]
WC	(France) D Added (France) U Humbert	6	3	[8]
(Monaco) H Nys (France) A Rinderknech	6	7
4	(Australia) L Saville (Australia) J-P Smith	3	5
Alt	(United States) H Reese (Netherlands) S Verbeek	6	3	[10]
(United Kingdom) J O'Mara (India) D Sharan	3	6	[8]
(United States) M Giron (France) A Olivetti	4	7^{7}	[1]
2	(Bosnia and Herzegovina) T Brkić (Serbia) N Ćaćić	6	6^{3}	[10]

Quarterfinals
1	(Finland) H Kontinen (Japan) B McLachlan	1	7	[10]
WC	(France) G Barrère (France) L Pouille	6	5	[7]
3	(Austria) O Marach (Austria) P Oswald	3	4
(Poland) H Hurkacz (Poland) J Zieliński	6	6
(Croatia) I Sabanov (Croatia) M Sabanov	3	4
(Monaco) H Nys (France) A Rinderknech	6	6
Alt	(United States) H Reese (Netherlands) S Verbeek	3	3
2	(Bosnia and Herzegovina) T Brkić (Serbia) N Ćaćić	6	6

Semifinals
1	(Finland) H Kontinen (Japan) B McLachlan	4	4
(Poland) H Hurkacz (Poland) J Zieliński	6	6
(Monaco) H Nys (France) A Rinderknech	6	7^{7}
2	(Bosnia and Herzegovina) T Brkić (Serbia) N Ćaćić	3	6^{3}

Final
(Poland) H Hurkacz (Poland) J Zieliński	7	6
(Monaco) H Nys (France) A Rinderknech	5	3
