= Open Metz–Grand Est =

- 2026 Open Metz–Grand Est

ATP Challenger Tour
- Location: Metz, France
- Venue: Les Arènes
- Category: ATP Challenger Tour 125
- Surface: Hard (indoor)
- Website: website

The Open Metz–Grand Est is a professional tennis tournament played on indoor hardcourts. It is currently part of the ATP Challenger Tour 125. It was first held in Metz, France in 2026 after the removal of the Moselle Open from the ATP Tour calendar.

== Past finals ==
=== Singles ===
Year	Champion	Runner-up	Score
2026	(Italy) Francesco Passaro	(South Korea) Kwon Soon-woo	6–3, 7–6^{(7–2)}

=== Doubles ===
Year	Champions	Runners-up	Score
2026	(Spain) Íñigo Cervantes (Spain) Pedro Martínez	(Ecuador) Gonzalo Escobar (India) Niki Kaliyanda Poonacha	6–4, 6–4
