= Hubert Hurkacz =

Polish tennis player (born 1997)

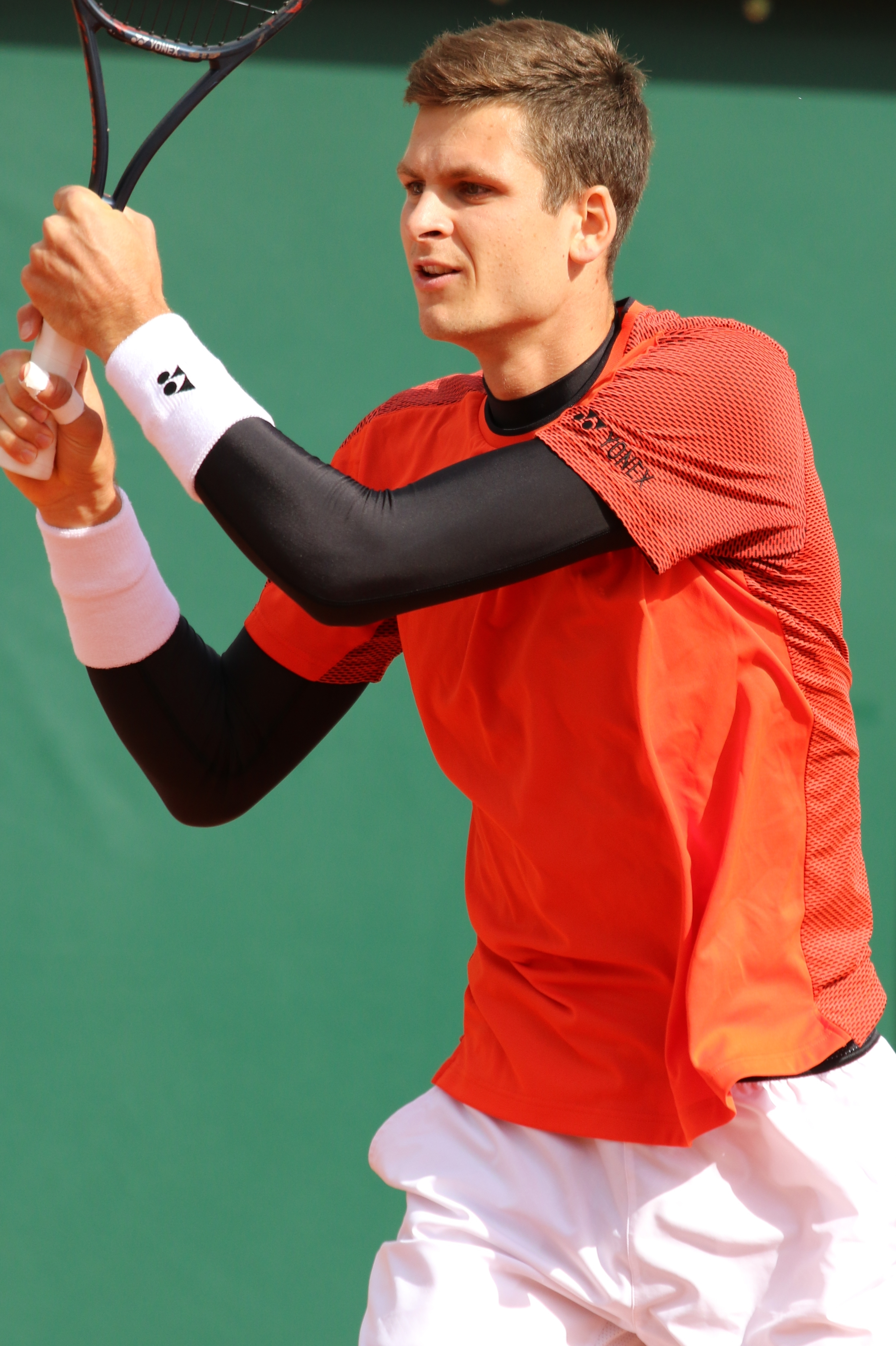
- Hurkacz at French Open in 2019
- Country (sports): Poland
- Residence: Monte Carlo, Monaco
- Born: 11 February 1997 (age 29) Wrocław, Poland
- Height: 1.96 m (6 ft 5 in)
- Turned pro: 2015
- Plays: Right-handed (two-handed backhand)
- Coach: Mateusz Terczynski (2022–), Gilles Cervara (May 2026-), Nicolás Massú (Nov 2024-Apr 2026), Ivan Lendl (Nov 2024-2025); Craig Boynton (2019–2024)
- Prize money: US $22,059,044: 31th all–time in earnings

Singles
- Career record: 249–171
- Career titles: 8
- Highest ranking: No. 6 (5 August 2024)
- Current ranking: No. 30 (9 November 2026)

Grand Slam singles results
- Australian Open: QF (2024)
- French Open: 4R (2022, 2024)
- Wimbledon: SF (2021)
- US Open: 2R (2018, 2020, 2021, 2022, 2023, 2024, 2026)

Other tournaments
- Tour Finals: RR (2021, 2023)
- Olympic Games: 2R (2020)

Doubles
- Career record: 56–65
- Career titles: 4
- Highest ranking: No. 30 (13 June 2022)
- Current ranking: No. 905 (31 August 2026)

Grand Slam doubles results
- Australian Open: 1R (2020, 2021)
- French Open: 2R (2020)
- US Open: 2R (2021)

Other doubles tournaments
- Olympic Games: 1R (2020)

Team competitions
- Davis Cup: 8–9
- Last updated on: 3 October 2026.

Hubert Hurkacz (Polish pronunciation: [ˈxubɛrt ˈxurkatʂ]; born 11 February 1997) is a Polish professional tennis player. In August 2024, he reached a career-high ranking of world No. 6 in singles by the ATP, making him the highest-ranked Polish man in the Open Era. He also reached a best doubles ranking of No. 30 in June 2022. He is currently the No. 1 Polish player in men's singles.

Hurkacz has won eight ATP Tour singles titles, including two Masters 1000 titles at the 2021 Miami Open and the 2023 Shanghai Masters, becoming the first Pole to win an ATP Masters 1000 title.

As a junior, Hurkacz was ranked as high as No. 29 in the world. He and his partner Alex Molčan were the runners-up at the 2015 Australian Open boys' doubles final. As a professional, he broke into the top 100 for the first time in 2018 after reaching the second rounds of the 2018 French Open and 2018 US Open. That year, he qualified for the Next Generation ATP Finals, where he won against Jaume Munar, but lost to Frances Tiafoe and Stefanos Tsitsipas. In 2019, he won his first ATP title at the 2019 Winston-Salem Open. The next year, he defeated three higher-ranked opponents at the 2020 ATP Cup and reached the semifinals of the 2020 ATP Auckland Open. In doing so, he entered the top 30 of the world rankings. In 2021, after winning his second and third singles titles, he went on to reach his first Grand Slam semifinal at the 2021 Wimbledon Championships and became the second Polish man to make a semifinals appearance at a Grand Slam after Jerzy Janowicz in 2013.

Hurkacz is an all-court player. At 1.96 m (6 ft 5 in), he also possesses a serve reaching up to 151 miles per hour (243 km/h) to set up effective one-two punches. In addition to being a defensive baseliner, he has often included netplay into his style and has been recognized for his penchant for playing serve-and-volley to close points.

== Early life and background ==
Hurkacz was born on 11 February 1997 to Zofia Maliszewska-Hurkacz and Krzysztof Hurkacz in Wrocław, Poland, as the first of two children. His younger sister, Nika, is ten years younger and also plays tennis. Hurkacz grew up in a family with athletic prowess. His mother was a junior tennis champion in Poland, and one of his uncles, Tomasz Maliszewski, played tennis professionally. His grandfather was also a volleyball player at an international level. When asked whether his family's history shaped him to become the athlete he became, Hurkacz replied, "The [sporting] genes, the motivation in the family, the love for the sport. I think they have helped me a lot."

Hurkacz began playing tennis at the age of five after his mother introduced him to the sport as she practiced. His mother and father were his first teachers but he later enrolled in classes and started playing more consistently. He later became interested in professional tennis after watching Roger Federer on television. He has stated that if tennis was not his future, he would have pursued either basketball or motor racing, or he would continue his education. By 2014, Hurkacz had established himself as a member of the group of the most talented young Polish tennis players at the time, alongside Kamil Majchrzak and Jan Zieliński.

== Career ==
=== 2018: First major match wins and Next Generation ATP Finals ===
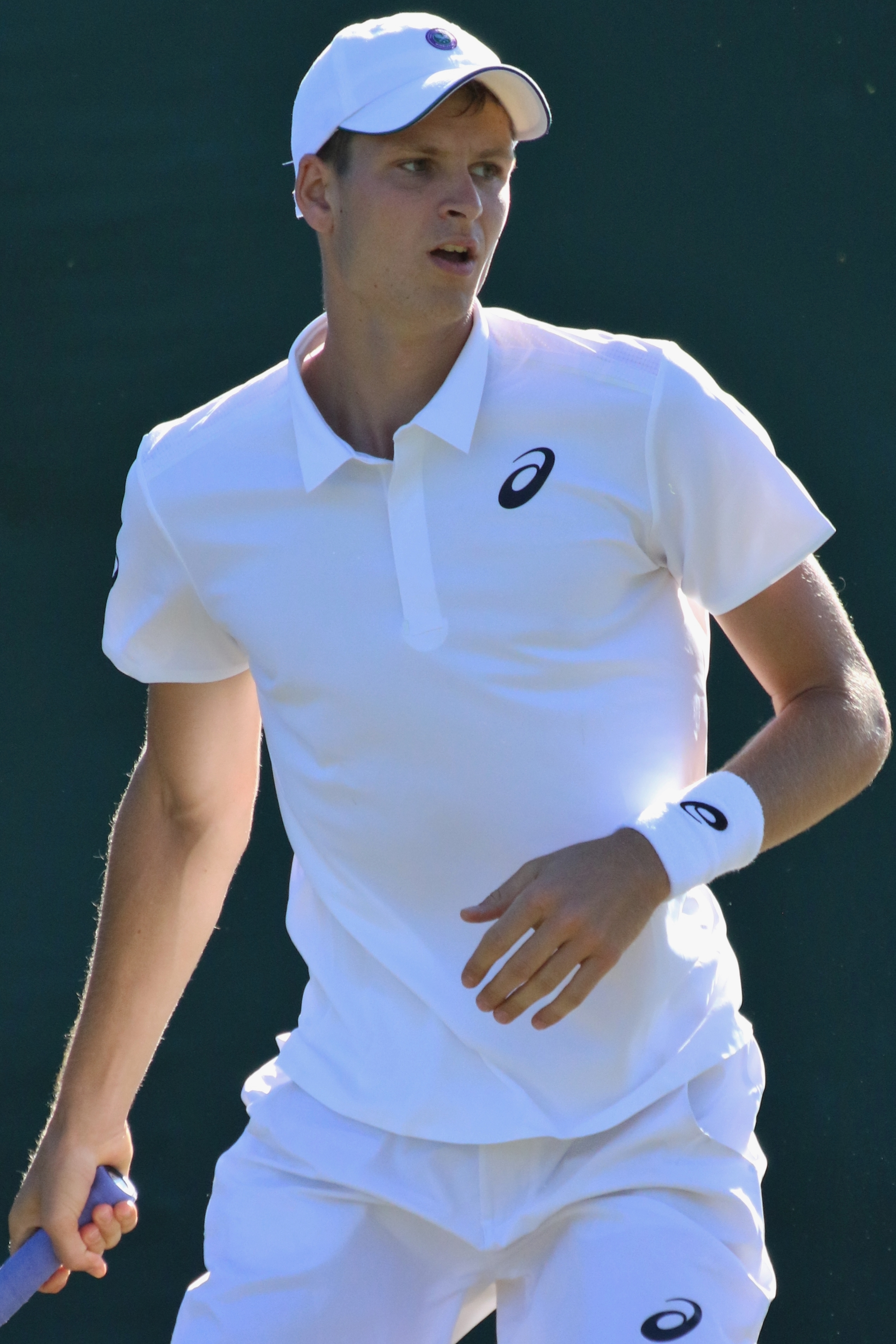
Hurkacz at the 2018 Wimbledon Championships

Hurkacz played in the main draw at the French Open and defeated Tennys Sandgren in the first round. This marked his first victory at a Grand Slam and at any ATP main-draw event. He lost in the second round to third seed Marin Čilić in four sets.

In August, Hurkacz made his US Open debut. He began as the sixth seed in the qualifying draw and reached his third consecutive Grand Slam main draw as a qualifier, beating John-Patrick Smith, Egor Gerasimov and Pedro Martínez Portero (all in straight sets) to enter into the first round. There, he faced Stefano Travaglia who, like many others, fell victim to the extreme heat and retired. In the second round, Hurkacz lost to 2014 US Open champion Čilić in their second meeting.

In November, Hurkacz played at the NextGen Finals in Milan where he defeated Jaume Munar but lost to Frances Tiafoe and Stefanos Tsitsipas. At the end of the season he received a nomination for the ATP Newcomer of the Year Award.

=== 2019: First ATP Tour title and top 40 debut ===
Hurkacz started his season at the Maharashtra Open in Pune, India. He continued at the Canberra Challenger, where he won the title after defeating Ilya Ivashka in the final. Hurkacz followed that up by making his debut at the Australian Open. He faced one of the best servers on the Tour, drawing Ivo Karlović in the opening round at Melbourne Park. After winning the first set, Hurkacz lost the match in four sets, all of which were tiebreakers. At the Dubai Championships, he defeated Corentin Moutet in the first round and then went on to win against No. 1 seeded player, Kei Nishikori, which marked his first ever win against a top 10 player. Hurkacz lost in the quarterfinals in three sets to the eventual runner-up of the tournament, Stefanos Tsitsipas.

In March, Hurkacz played at the Indian Wells Open, where he made it to the quarterfinals of an ATP Masters 1000 event for the first time in his career. On his way to the quarterfinals, he defeated Kei Nishikori in the third round and Denis Shapovalov in the fourth round. In the quarterfinals, he lost to Roger Federer. Following Indian Wells, Hurkacz achieved a new career high singles ranking of world No. 54. He continued at Miami, where he defeated Matteo Berrettini in first round. In the second round, Hurkacz took down the 2019 Indian Wells Open champion Dominic Thiem, in straight sets, before falling to Félix Auger-Aliassime in the third round.

At the Madrid Open, Hurkacz defeated Alex de Minaur and Lucas Pouille. He lost to Alexander Zverev in the third round after winning the first set. He continued at the French Open, where he lost to world No. 1, Novak Djokovic, in the first round.

Hurkacz later produced an upset in the first round of the Eastbourne International, with a victory over seventh seed Marco Cecchinato in just over an hour. He then defeated Steve Johnson in the second round. In the quarterfinals Hurkacz lost a tight match against the eventual champion Taylor Fritz.

For the first time in his career, Hurkacz reached the third round of a Grand Slam. At Wimbledon, he defeated Dušan Lajović and Leonardo Mayer to set up a third-round match with world No. 1 Djokovic. For two sets, Hurkacz gave Djokovic all he could handle before eventually succumbing to the top seed in four sets. At the Rogers Cup, Hurkacz defeated Taylor Fritz and Stefanos Tsitsipas before losing his third-round match to Gaël Monfils. Two weeks later, Hurkacz defeated Benoît Paire to win his first ATP title in Winston-Salem. In October, Hurkacz prevailed over Monfils in straight sets in the second round of the Shanghai Masters. In the third round he lost to Stefanos Tsitsipas.

=== 2020: First Masters doubles title and top 30 ===
At the 2020 ATP Cup, Hurkacz defeated a trio of higher-ranked opponents: Dominic Thiem, Diego Schwartzman and Borna Ćorić. Sixth seed, Hurkacz picked up where he left off at the ATP Cup, advancing to the semifinal of the ATP Auckland Open with victories over Lorenzo Sonego, Mikael Ymer, and Feliciano López. Seeded No. 31 at the Australian Open, Hurkacz reached the second round, defeating Dennis Novak before falling to John Millman in straight sets. With this successful run he reached the top 30 at world No. 28, on 3 February 2020.

Playing at the Rotterdam Open Hurkacz lost a three set 1st round match to Tsitsipas. He continued in doubles with Auger-Aliassime. To reach the quarterfinal, they defeated third seeds Nikola Mektić and Wesley Koolhof. At Dubai, Hurkacz lost to Alexander Bublik in the first round.

After tennis stopped in March 2020 due to COVID-19 pandemic, Hurkacz resumed training with his coach Craig Boynton at the Saddlebrook Academies in Florida.

In May, Hurkacz played at the UTR Pro Match Series presented by Tennis Channel, a two-day round-robin tournament in West Palm Beach, Florida. Four top 60 ATP players including Hurkacz, Miomir Kecmanović, Reilly Opelka and Tommy Paul competed in the inaugural edition from 8–9 May 2020.

In August, Hurkacz traveled to New York City for the Cincinnati Open. In the first round he lost to John Isner. He continued at the US Open, where he defeated Peter Gojowczyk in the first round. In the second round he lost to Alejandro Davidovich Fokina. Seeded fifth at the Austrian Open Kitzbühel, Hurkacz defeated João Sousa in the first round. At the Italian Open, he defeated 2020 US Open quarterfinalist Andrey Rublev before falling to eighth seed Diego Schwartzman in the third round.

Hurkacz continued at the French Open where he was seeded at No. 29. In the first round he lost to Tennys Sandgren in five sets.

Hurkacz and Auger-Aliassime ended the six-match winning streak of Łukasz Kubot and Marcelo Melo to reach their maiden doubles team final at the Paris Masters. They defeated US Open champions Mate Pavić and Bruno Soares in the final.

=== 2021: Masters title, Major semifinal, ATP Finals & world No. 9 ===
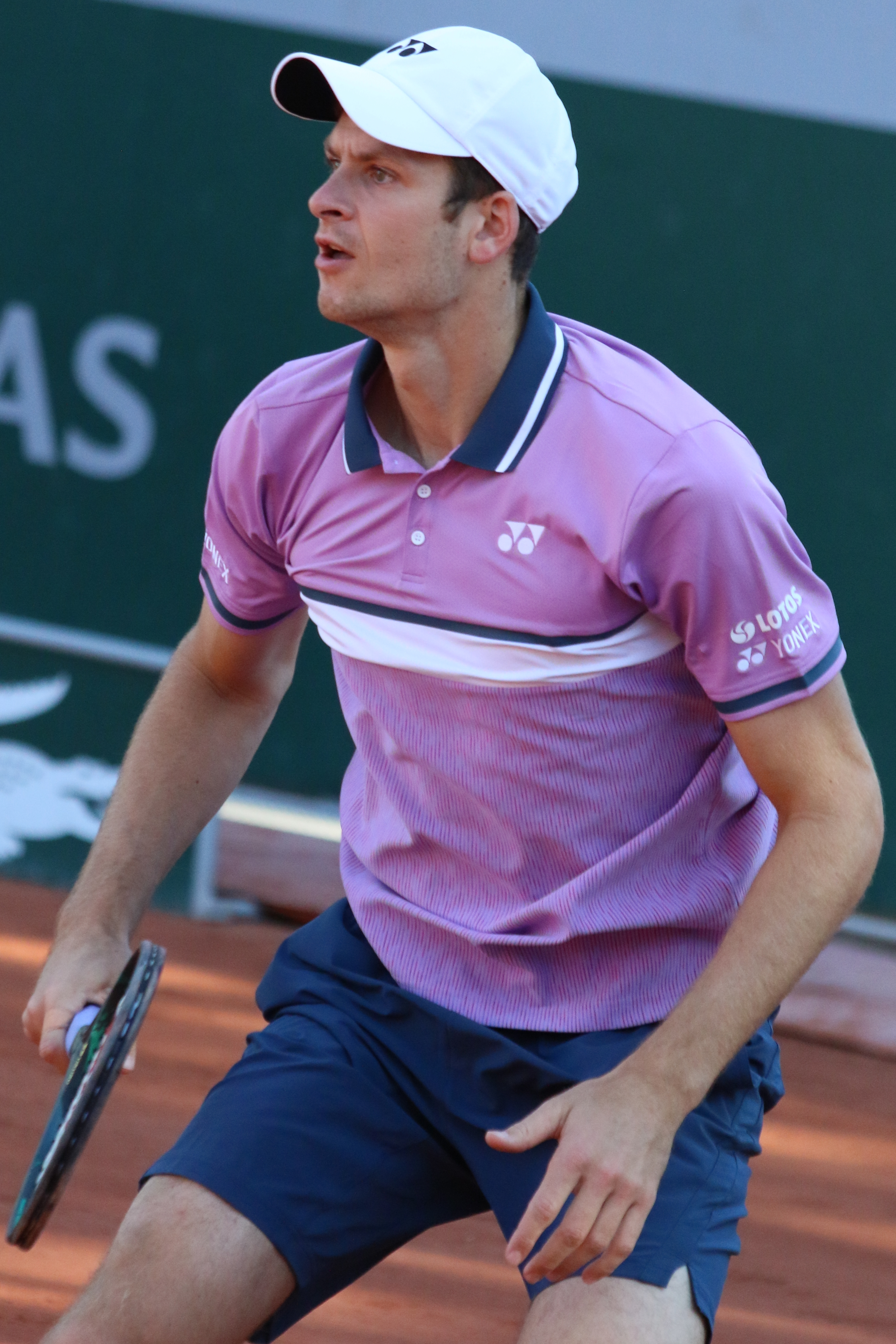
Hurkacz at the 2021 French Open

Hurkacz started his season at the Delray Beach Open where he was seeded fourth. He advanced to his second career ATP Tour final in straight sets. In the final, he defeated Sebastian Korda to win his second ATP title. Next, Hurkacz played at the 2021 Great Ocean Road Open in Melbourne, where he reached the quarterfinals in both singles and doubles. Coming into the Australian Open as the No. 26 seed, he lost to Mikael Ymer in the first round.

At the Rotterdam Open, Hurkacz struck 17 aces to knock out Adrian Mannarino in straight sets. In the second round, he lost to second-seeded Stefanos Tsitsipas in three sets. He continued at the Dubai Championships, where he defeated Richard Gasquet before falling to third-seeded Denis Shapovalov in the third round.

In March, Hurkacz participated at the Miami Open. He defeated Denis Shapovalov, Milos Raonic, Tsitsipas, Rublev, and Jannik Sinner en route to his first Masters 1000 title and third ATP title overall. By lifting the title in Miami, he entered the top 20 for the first time and reached a career-high ranking of No. 16 on 5 April 2021.

At the Halle Open he reached his second doubles final partnering again with Auger-Aliassime, but lost to third-seeded German Kevin Krawietz and Romanian Horia Tecău.

As the 14th seed at Wimbledon, Hurkacz defeated Lorenzo Musetti, Marcos Giron and Alexander Bublik all in straight sets to reach the fourth round at a Grand Slam for the first time in his career. In the fourth round Hurkacz defeated second seed Daniil Medvedev, his third top-10 win of the year. He was the fifth Polish man to reach the Wimbledon quarterfinals. Hurkacz then defeated eight-time Wimbledon champion and sixth seed Roger Federer in the quarterfinals in three sets, in what would transpire to be the Swiss player's final professional singles match. With this victory, he became the first man since Mario Ančić in 2002 to defeat Federer in straight sets at Wimbledon. Hurkacz became only the second Polish man in history to reach the semifinals at a Grand Slam (after Jerzy Janowicz at Wimbledon in 2013). Hurkacz then lost to 7th-seed Matteo Berrettini in the semifinals. With this successful run he entered the top 15 in the rankings at World No. 11 on 12 July 2021.

Following his Wimbledon run, Hurkacz attended the 2020 Summer Olympics and entered as the seventh seed. He defeated Luke Saville in the first round before falling in a stunning defeat to Liam Broady in a second round three-setter. For the year's US Open Series, Hurkacz embarked on his first tournament of the North American summer swing at the Canadian Open in Toronto, where the seventh seed defeated Nikoloz Basilashvili to reach the quarterfinals before he lost to top seed Daniil Medvedev in a tight three-set match involving two tiebreaks. The following week, ninth-seeded Hurkacz took on the Cincinnati Masters and defeated former world No. 1 Andy Murray in straight sets before losing to Pablo Carreño Busta in the third round in another hard-fought match with two tiebreak sets. The loss ended Hurkacz's 12-match win streak in the United States following his success at Delray Beach and Miami earlier in the year. In New York, Hurkacz embarked on the US Open as the 10th seed. He defeated Egor Gerasimov in the first round in straight sets before he was ousted by Andreas Seppi in a five-set second round match with a final set tiebreak.

After his loss in New York, Hurkacz headed to the 2021 Moselle Open to play in both the singles and doubles tournaments. In the singles, he was drawn as the top seed. After he defeated Lucas Pouille, Murray, and Peter Gojowczyk without dropping a set, he beat Carreño Busta in another straight-set win in the final and earned himself his fourth ATP title. In the doubles, after making the finals without dropping a set, Hurkacz and his partner, Jan Zieliński, defeated Hugo Nys and Arthur Rinderknech in straight sets to win the tournament. Hurkacz's win gave him his second career doubles title and made him the first player to sweep both titles in the tournament's history. The win earned him a top 50 debut in doubles and his then-career-high doubles ranking of world No. 47 on 27 September 2021.

Seeded eighth at the Indian Wells Masters, he reached the quarterfinals without dropping a set after beating Alexei Popyrin, Frances Tiafoe, and Aslan Karatsev. There, he lost to Grigor Dimitrov in a three-set match that ended in a deciding tiebreak. After the tournament, Hurkacz made his debut in the top 10 at No. 10 on 18 October and became just the second male Polish tennis player to be ranked inside the top 10 in singles after Wojciech Fibak achieved the feat in 1977.

At the Paris Masters, Hurkacz defeated qualifier Tommy Paul and lucky loser Dominik Koepfer to reach the quarterfinals. There, he beat Australian James Duckworth, to take the 8th and final spot at the ATP Finals. He is the second Polish player to earn a spot at the event in tournament history (after 1976 runner-up Wojciech Fibak). Hurkacz lost to Novak Djokovic in the semifinals in three sets. Due to his result at the tournament, his ranking shot up to World No. 9 thus surpassing Wojciech Fibak for the highest ranked Polish man in ATP singles ranking history.

=== 2022: Second Masters singles final and doubles title, ATP 500 title ===
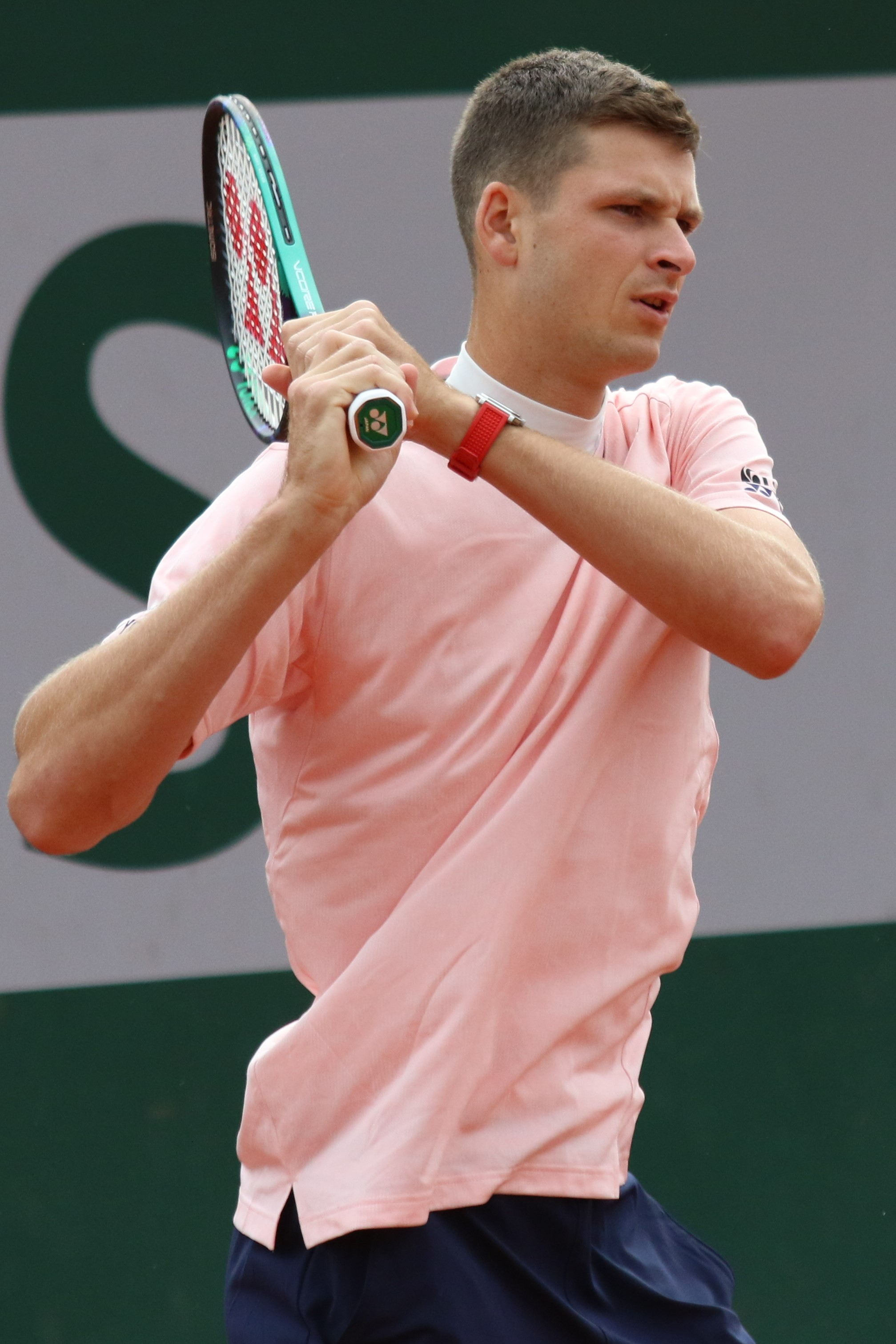
Hurkacz at the 2022 French Open

In January Hubert Hurkacz participated at the 2022 ATP Cup, where his win over Diego Schwartzman sealed victory for Poland over Argentina and allowed Polish team to advance to the semifinals. At the Australian Open, Hurkacz defeated Egor Gerasimov before falling to Adrian Mannarino in the second round. Seeded fourth at Rotterdam, Hurkacz overpowered Jo-Wilfried Tsonga in the first round. In the second round he lost to Lorenzo Musetti in three sets.

At Dubai, Hurkacz reached his first ATP 500 semifinal when he defeated Jannik Sinner. Seeded fifth, he lost to second seed Andrey Rublev in the semifinal.

In March, Hurkacz, seeded eighth, entered into the Miami Open where he was the defending champion. After wins over Arthur Rinderknech, Aslan Karatsev and Lloyd Harris, he reached the quarterfinals where he defeated top seeded Daniil Medvedev. In the semifinals, he lost in a close match to Carlos Alcaraz in straight sets, which included two tiebreaks. Hurkacz also entered the doubles tournament with John Isner as wildcards, where they won the title defeating Wesley Koolhof and Neal Skupski in the final.

At the Monte Carlo Masters, Hurkacz recorded his 100th career victory by defeating Pedro Martínez in the second round. He then defeated Albert Ramos Viñolas to reach his first Masters 1000 quarterfinal on a clay court. At the quarterfinals he fell short to Grigor Dimitrov again in a three set thriller.

In May, Hurkacz participated at the Madrid Open achieving victories over Hugo Dellien, Alejandro Davidovich Fokina and Dušan Lajović. In the quarterfinal, he lost to world No. 1, Novak Djokovic, in straight sets. At the Italaian Open, Hurkacz lost in the first round to David Goffin in two tiebreak sets.

He reached the fourth round at the French Open for the first time beating Goffin in the third. He lost in the fourth round to Casper Ruud in four sets. With that match Hurkacz concluded his clay season as one of the best in his career so far with a win-loss record of 9–3.

In June, he won the Halle Open, his first title of 2022, on grass, as well as his first ATP 500 title, winning against the new world No. 1, Daniil Medvedev, in the final. On the way to the final he defeated Maxime Cressy, Ugo Humbert, Félix Auger-Aliassime and Nick Kyrgios. This also became his fifth singles final in a row that he won and became the seventh player in the Open Era to win the first five ATP tour finals. He lost his first-round match at the 2022 Wimbledon Championships to Alejandro Davidovich Fokina in a tight 3 1/2 hours five set match with a super tiebreak in the fifth, after saving three match points.

At the Canadian Open Hurkacz battled past Emil Ruusuvuori, Albert Ramos Viñolas, Nick Kyrgios and fourth seed Casper Ruud to reach the final. In the final he lost to Pablo Carreño Busta in three sets. The defeat ended Hurkacz's 5-ATP Tour finals win streak. At the same tournament, he reached the semifinals in doubles with compatriot Zieliński defeating en route sixth seeds Puetz/Venus in the first round, Bopanna/Middelkoop in the second and fourth seeds, French Open champions Arévalo/Rogers in the quarterfinals.

In September, Hurkacz participated at the Moselle Open as the defending champion and reached the semifinal, after defeating Dominic Thiem and Arthur Rinderknech. In the semifinal he lost to Lorenzo Sonego in straight sets.

In October, he entered the Astana Open and defeated Francisco Cerúndolo and Alexander Bublik in the first and second rounds respectively. He advanced to the quarterfinal where he lost to Stefanos Tsitsipas in straight sets. At the 2022 European Open in Antwerp, he also reached the quarterfinals but lost to Dominic Thiem. At the Vienna Open, he advanced to his third consecutive quarterfinal where he faced Borna Ćorić, losing a tight three-set match featuring two tie-breaks. At the Paris Masters, he beat Adrian Mannarino in the first round, before losing to the eventual champion Holger Rune in the second round.

=== 2023: United Cup semifinalist, second Masters title ===
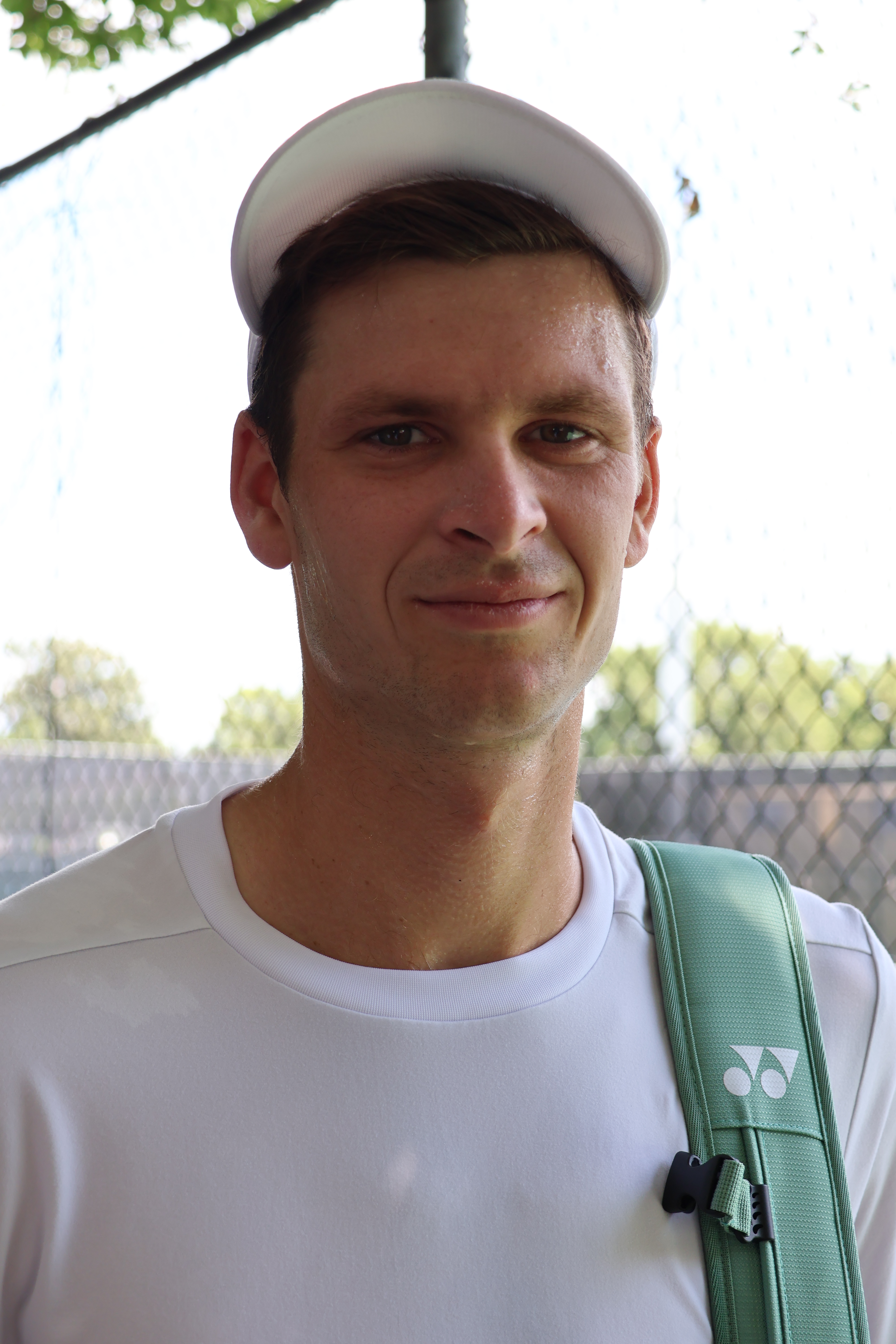
Hurkacz at practice at the 2023 DC Open

Ranked No. 10 at the 2023 United Cup Hurkacz defeated Alexander Bublik to give Poland a 2–1 lead against Kazakhstan. Hurkacz then defeated Switzerland's Stan Wawrinka to help Poland advance to the Brisbane City Finals. Paired with Iga Świątek against the Italian pair of Camilla Rosatello and Lorenzo Musetti, Hubi and Iga won the decisive point to send Poland into the United Cup Final Four in Sydney.

At the 2023 Australian Open Hurkacz, the No. 10 seed, defeated Pedro Martínez in the first round. In the second round he faced Lorenzo Sonego and won the match in five sets. He defeated Denis Shapovalov in the next round in five sets and advanced to the fourth round, his best result at Australian Open so far. He played against Sebastian Korda and lost a tight five-set match, which ended in a super tiebreak.

In February, he reached the final in Marseille defeating Leandro Riedi, Mikael Ymer and Alexander Bublik en route. In the final, he beat Benjamin Bonzi in straight sets to claim his sixth career singles title.

In March, at the 2023 Miami Open he reached the third round with a win over lucky loser Thanasi Kokkinakis after saving five match points, playing in the longest three sets match of the season thus far, lasting 3 hours and 31 minutes with three tiebreaks.

At the 2023 Monte-Carlo Masters he recorded his 50th Masters win, more than any other Polish male player, defeating Laslo Djere in another also close to three and half hours battle with three tiebreaks saving a match point. In the second round he defeated Jack Draper before losing to Jannik Sinner in three sets in the third round.

In May, Hurkacz entered the 2023 French Open as the 13th seed. In the first round, he defeated David Goffin in five sets. In the second round, he played against Tallon Griekspoor and again won the match in five sets. He was subsequently upset in the third round by unseeded Juan Pablo Varillas in five sets.

At Wimbledon, Hurkacz entered the tournament as the 17th seed. He reached the fourth round after eliminating Albert Ramos Viñolas, Jan Choinski and Lorenzo Musetti all in straight sets. In the fourth round, despite having served 33 aces, he lost to second seed Novak Djokovic in four sets featuring two tie-breaks. At the Canadian Open, Hurkacz, the last year's runner-up at the event, reached third round after beating Alexander Bublik and Miomir Kecmanović. In the third round, he lost to the reigning world No. 1, Carlos Alcaraz, in three sets. At the Western & Southern Open, Hurkacz defeated Thanasi Kokkinakis, Borna Ćorić, Stefanos Tsitsipas and Alexei Popyrin. In the semifinal, he again lost to Carlos Alcaraz in three sets. In September, he made his debut appearance at the Laver Cup representing Team Europe.

In October he reached his third Masters career final at Shanghai defeating Fábián Marozsán and Sebastian Korda. In the final, he defeated Andrey Rublev in three sets to claim his second Masters title and his seventh overall. As a result, he returned to world No. 11 in the singles rankings on 16 October 2023. Hurkacz reached another final at the ATP 500 2023 Swiss Indoors defeating Ugo Humbert. In the final he lost to the defending champion Félix Auger-Aliassime. At the 2023 Paris Masters, he reached the quarterfinal stage of the tournament where he lost to Grigor Dimitrov in three sets. He entered the 2023 ATP Finals as an alternate, replacing Stefanos Tsitsipas, and played one match against Novak Djokovic losing in three sets.

=== 2024: United Cup final, Australian quarterfinal, first clay title, World No. 6 ===
Hurkacz started the season at the 2024 United Cup. Following his first match win in singles he paired up with Iga Świątek in mixed doubles to secure a win over Brazil. With the wins over Spain, China and France, team Poland qualified for the finals.

Seeded ninth at the 2024 Australian Open, Hurkacz defeated qualifiers Omar Jasika and Jakub Menšík, 21st seed Ugo Humbert and another Frenchman, wildcard Arthur Cazaux to reach the quarterfinals for the first time at this Major. He lost to Daniil Medvedev in a four hour five setter match. As a result he moved to World No. 8 in the rankings.

In February, Hurkacz entered the Open 13 Provence tournament as the defending champion. He reached the semifinals, after having defeated Alexander Shevchenko and Tomáš Macháč. In the semifinal he lost to Ugo Humbert in two sets.

In March in Miami, he lost on the round of 16 to 11th seed Grigor Dimitrov.

In April, seeded second, he made his first clay semifinal in his career at the 2024 Estoril Open with wins over qualifiers Jan Choinski and Pablo Llamas Ruiz. Next he reached his first clay court final and tenth overall defeating Cristian Garín. He lifted his first clay court title defeating Pedro Martinez in straight sets, having won a title on all surfaces, joining the list of then 16 active players having accomplished this feat.

In May, Hurkacz participated at the Italian Open where he reached the quarterfinal after defeating Rafael Nadal, T.M. Etcheverry and Sebastián Báez. In the quarterfinal, he eventually lost to Tommy Paul in three sets. By achieving this, he became the sixth player born in the 1990s (after Dominic Thiem, Stefanos Tsitsipas, Alexander Zverev, Grigor Dimitrov, and Daniil Medvedev) to reach at least the quarterfinals at all nine Masters events, and the eleventh active player overall to accomplish the feat.

At the French Open, Hurkacz equalled his best result at the tournament by reaching the fourth round after eliminating Shintaro Mochizuki, Brandon Nakashima and Denis Shapovalov. In the fourth round he lost to Grigor Dimitrov in three sets.

Following reaching the final for the second time at the 2024 Halle Open with a win over Alexander Zverev, he climbed two positions up to a new career-high ranking of world No. 7 on 24 June 2024. In the final, he lost to the world No. 1, Jannik Sinner, in two sets both of which ended in a tie-break.

At Wimbledon, Hurkacz reached the second round and was forced to retire in the fourth set after sustaining a knee injury in a match against Arthur Fils. As a result, he withdrew from the 2024 Summer Olympics where he was supposed to play in the singles, doubles and mixed doubles events. Despite his retirement, he moved up to a new career best ranking of world No. 6, on 5 August 2024.

In August, he reached two consecutive quarterfinals, first at the Canadian Open losing to the eventual champion Alexei Popyrin and then at the Cincinnati Open retiring in the match against Frances Tiafoe.

=== 2025: Second United Cup and Geneva finals, surgery ===
Hurkacz entered the United Cup representing Team Poland for the third time. With his team, he advanced to the final, where Team United States defeated Team Poland. In May, Hurkacz reached the finals of the Geneva Open, where he lost to Novak Djokovic in a close match. He lost in the first round of the 2025 French Open to Joao Fonseca.

Starting in June, Hurkacz was out of the Tour after undergoing arthroscopic surgery and subsequently withdrew from Wimbledon and from the US Open.

=== 2026: Return to Tour, United Cup title, out of top 100 ===
Hurkacz once again represented Poland at the United Cup. He defeated Alexander Zverev in straights in his first match in 7 months. Poland then progressed to the final, defeating Australia, despite Hurkacz losing to Alex De Minaur, & the USA in the quarter-final & semi-final respectively. In the final, Hurkacz defeated Switzerland's Stan Wawrinka to keep Poland in title contention, after Iga Świątek lost. After the Poland's victory in the Mixed Doubles, Poland won the United Cup.

At the 2026 Australian Open, Hurkacz defeated Zizou Bergs in 4 sets in the first round, however lost out to Ethan Quinn in straights in the second round. He then lost in the first round at the Open Occitanie, ABN AMRO Open, Dubai Tennis Championships, Indian Wells Open, Copa Cap Cana Challenger & Miami Open.

Hurkacz ended this losing streak at the Monte-Carlo Masters, defeating Luciano Darderi & Fábián Marozsán to make the third round. He lost out to eventual semi-finalist Valentin Vacherot. He then lost in the second round of Madrid to Lorenzo Musetti, but then made the final of the Sardegna Open (Challenger), losing out to French Open semi-finalist Matteo Arnaldi.

At Roland Garros, Hurkacz won his first round against Jaume Munar. In the second round, he lost out to Frances Tiafoe in 5 sets. The contest lasted 4 hours 42 minutes.

After losing in the first round at the 2026 Libéma Open, Hurkacz dropped out of the top 100 for the first time since 2018 on 15th June 2026. He did, however win his first doubles match in 2 years, with Gabriel Diallo, saving match points in the match tiebreak. In August, Hurkacz won the Cancún Country Open, an ATP Challenger Tour 125 event beating the No. 1 seed Sebastian Baez in the final. On 29 September 2026, Hurkacz reached the final of Chengdu Open losing in straight sets to Alejandro Davidovich Fokina.

At the China Open, Hurkacz defeated Karen Khachanov in the quarterfinals to record his 250th tour-level win and become the first Polish man to reach the tournament's singles semifinals. He retired from his semifinal against Alex de Minaur with an adductor injury.

At the 2026 Shanghai Masters, Hurkacz defeated Novak Djokovic 6–4, 6–3 in the second round, his first victory in their nine meetings. He became the fourth man, after Andy Murray, Dominic Thiem and Alexander Zverev, to defeat Roger Federer on grass, Rafael Nadal on clay and Djokovic on hard courts.

== Playing style ==
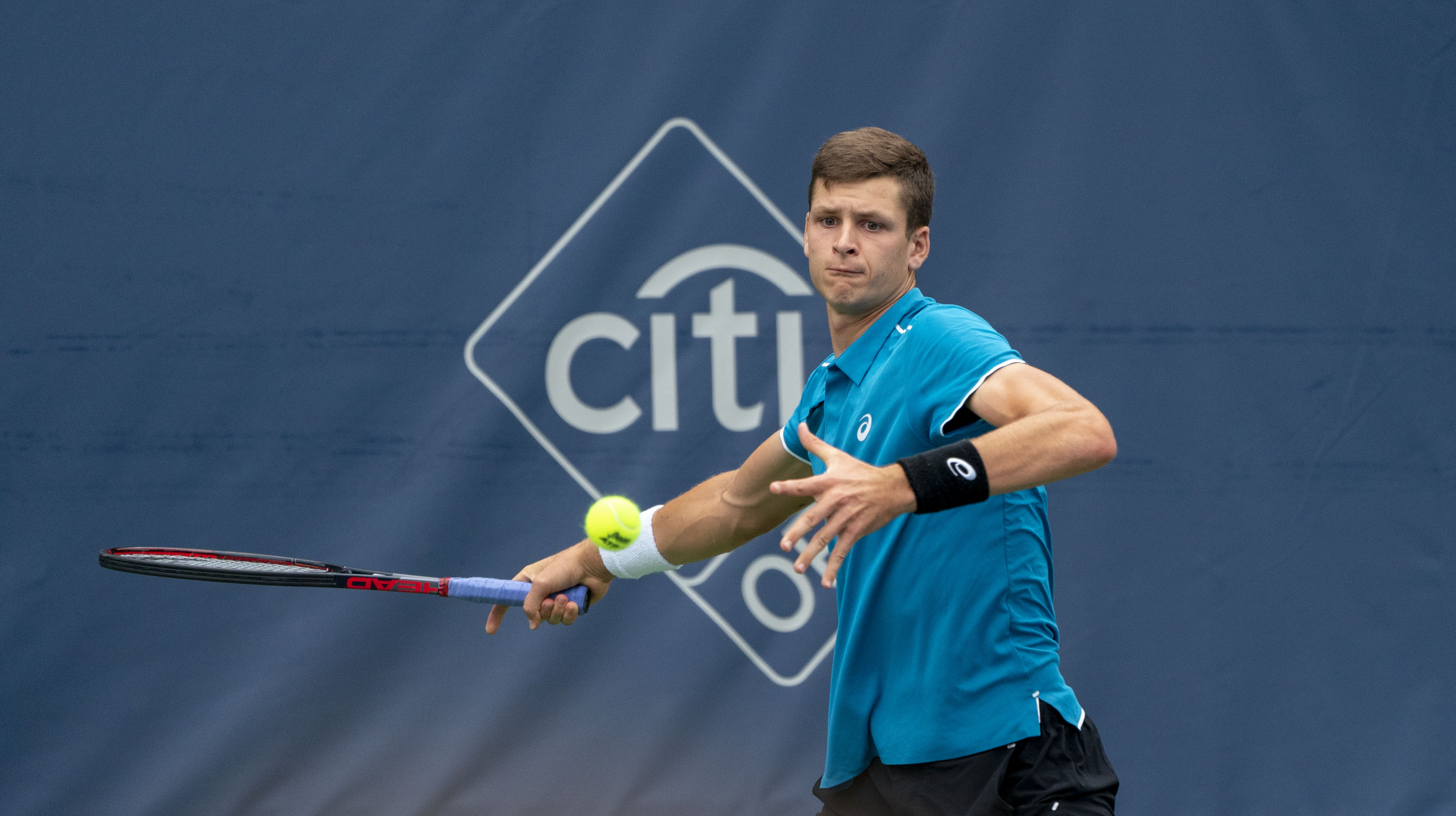
Hurkacz at the 2018 Citi Open

Hurkacz plays an all-court game with an emphasis on defensive baseline play, and former top 10 player Wojciech Fibak stated that Hurkacz is "an excellent, versatile player who can attack, accelerate and defend". Hurkacz is a big hitter, given that he stands 196 cm (6’5"). He is an effective server, with a top serve capable of reaching 151 miles per hour (243 km/h), and can hit powerfully from both his forehand and backhand. But like many of the tour's more powerful players, consistency has been described as an issue. Hurkacz plays solidly from the back of the court. He plays a low, flat and dangerous ball, while holding the ball in court. Over the years, Hurkacz has also developed a reputation as a diver on court. Speaking of his unique moves, Hurkacz explains, "I always enjoy grass courts, when you play on the hardcourt or clay court it's probably better not to dive as when you're falling down from the dive you can scratch yourself, on the grass, it's pretty comfortable. Sometimes, trying to get to a ball which is pretty far away, you just have to do it." He has also been described as a serve-and-volley player, especially on grass courts. His coach, Craig Boynton, summarized Hurkacz's style by comparing it to that of Andy Murray: "I think if you look at him, people have said he kind of mirrors Andy Murray with a similar routine on returns, a little bit of a similar backhand. He's a little taller than Andy. Andy's movement was phenomenal. But Hubi's a very good athlete, too."

Despite all tennis players being taught to keep their eye on the ball, Hurkacz does quite the opposite. In a 2019 interview with L'Équipe, he admitted, "I confess, it's true, I close my eyes when I hit the ball. In fact, I've probably always played like that, and it's been a while since I've been noticed."

== Coaches ==
In the early years (2010–2016), Hurkacz was coached by Filip Kańczuła. In 2017, he continued with Wrocław coaches Alexander Charpantidis and Paweł Stadniczenko, who shaped the tennis career of Michał Przysiężny, while Przemysław Piotrowicz was responsible for physical preparation. In 2018, "Hubi" decided to work with New Zealander Rene Moller, who appeared at his side during the Next Gen ATP Finals in Milan later that same year. Under his leadership, Hurkacz won the Challenger in Canberra and strengthened himself in the top 100. At the 2019 Indian Wells Open, Hurkacz began his coaching partnership with Craig Boynton, who had worked with players including Jim Courier, Mardy Fish, John Isner, Sam Querrey and Steve Johnson. In 2024, following his early exit in round two of the US Open, he split with his coach Craig Boynton after five years of collaboration. In November 2024, Hurkacz announced Nicolás Massú as his new coach with Ivan Lendl also joining the team as an advisor.

== Endorsements ==
Sports company Yonex was the primary brand sponsor of Hubert Hurkacz, until 2025. He is now sponsored by Adidas for clothes and Wilson for racquets. He is also sponsored by Lotos, a Polish capital group investing in oil. During his matches Hurkacz wears the Lotos brand's logo on his shirts. At the beginning of 2022 Hurkacz started to wear the Gerald Charles GC sport watch collection during his matches.

Hurkacz has turned his childhood love of sports cars into a partnership with U.K. based McLaren that has him driving McLaren vehicles while at tournaments. It started in New York City when Hurkacz toured around in the McLaren GT. At the 2021 BNP Paribas Open in Indian Wells he was spinning in the McLaren 720S, the same car he drives when in Poland.

== Personal life ==
For the past several years Hurkacz has adhered to a vegan diet. However, during an interview with ATP, he stated that "when I was a kid, I didn’t like salad at all and I didn’t like most of the veggies". He is popularly known by many as 'Hubi'.

Hurkacz had arthroscopic surgery on his right knee in June 2025. During the procedure, doctors removed an overgrown synovial membrane to help relieve the pain he was experiencing in the joint.

== Career statistics ==
=== Grand Slam performance timelines ===
Key
W	F	SF	QF	#R	RR	Q#	DNQ	A	NH

(W) winner; (F) finalist; (SF) semifinalist; (QF) quarterfinalist; (#R) rounds 4, 3, 2, 1; (RR) round-robin stage; (Q#) qualification round; (DNQ) did not qualify; (A) absent; (NH) not held; (SR) strike rate (events won / competed); (W–L) win–loss record.
To avoid confusion and double counting, these charts are updated at the conclusion of a tournament or when the player's participation has ended.

==== Singles ====
Current through the 2026 US Open.

Tournament	2018	2019	2020	2021	2022	2023	2024	2025	2026	SR	W–L	Win %
Australian Open	Q2	1R	2R	1R	2R	4R	QF	2R	2R	0 / 8	11–8	58%
French Open	2R	1R	1R	1R	4R	3R	4R	1R	2R	0 / 9	10–9	53%
Wimbledon	1R	3R	NH	SF	1R	4R	2R	A	4R	0 / 7	14–7	67%
US Open	2R	1R	2R	2R	2R	2R	2R	A	2R	0 / 8	7–8	47%
Win–loss	2–3	2–4	2–3	6–4	5–4	9–4	9–4	1–2	6–4	0 / 32	42–32	57%

==== Doubles ====
Tournament	2019	2020	2021	2022	2023	2024	2025	2026	SR	W–L	Win %
Australian Open	A	1R	1R	A	A	A	A	A	0 / 2	0–2	0%
French Open	1R	2R	1R	A	A	A	A	A	0 / 3	1–3	25%
Wimbledon	A	NH	A	A	A	A	A	A	0 / 0	0–0	–
US Open	1R	A	2R	A	A	A	A	A	0 / 2	1–2	33%
Win–loss	0–2	1–2	1–3	0–0	0–0	0–0	0–0	0–0	0 / 7	2–7	22%

=== ATP 1000 tournaments ===
==== Singles: 3 (2 titles, 1 runner-up) ====
Result	Year	Tournament	Surface	Opponent	Score
Win	2021	Miami Open	Hard	(Italy) Jannik Sinner	7–6^{(7–4)}, 6–4
Loss	2022	Canadian Open	Hard	(Spain) Pablo Carreño Busta	6–3, 3–6, 3–6
Win	2023	Shanghai Masters	Hard	Andrey Rublev	6–3, 3–6, 7–6^{(10–8)}

==== Doubles: 2 (2 titles) ====
Result	Year	Tournament	Surface	Partner	Opponents	Score
Win	2020	Paris Masters	Hard (i)	(Canada) Félix Auger-Aliassime	(Croatia) Mate Pavić (Brazil) Bruno Soares	6–7^{(3–7)}, 7–6^{(9–7)}, [10–2]
Win	2022	Miami Open	Hard	(United States) John Isner	(Netherlands) Wesley Koolhof (United Kingdom) Neal Skupski	7–6^{(7–5)}, 6–4
