= Hugo Nys =

French-born Monegasque tennis player

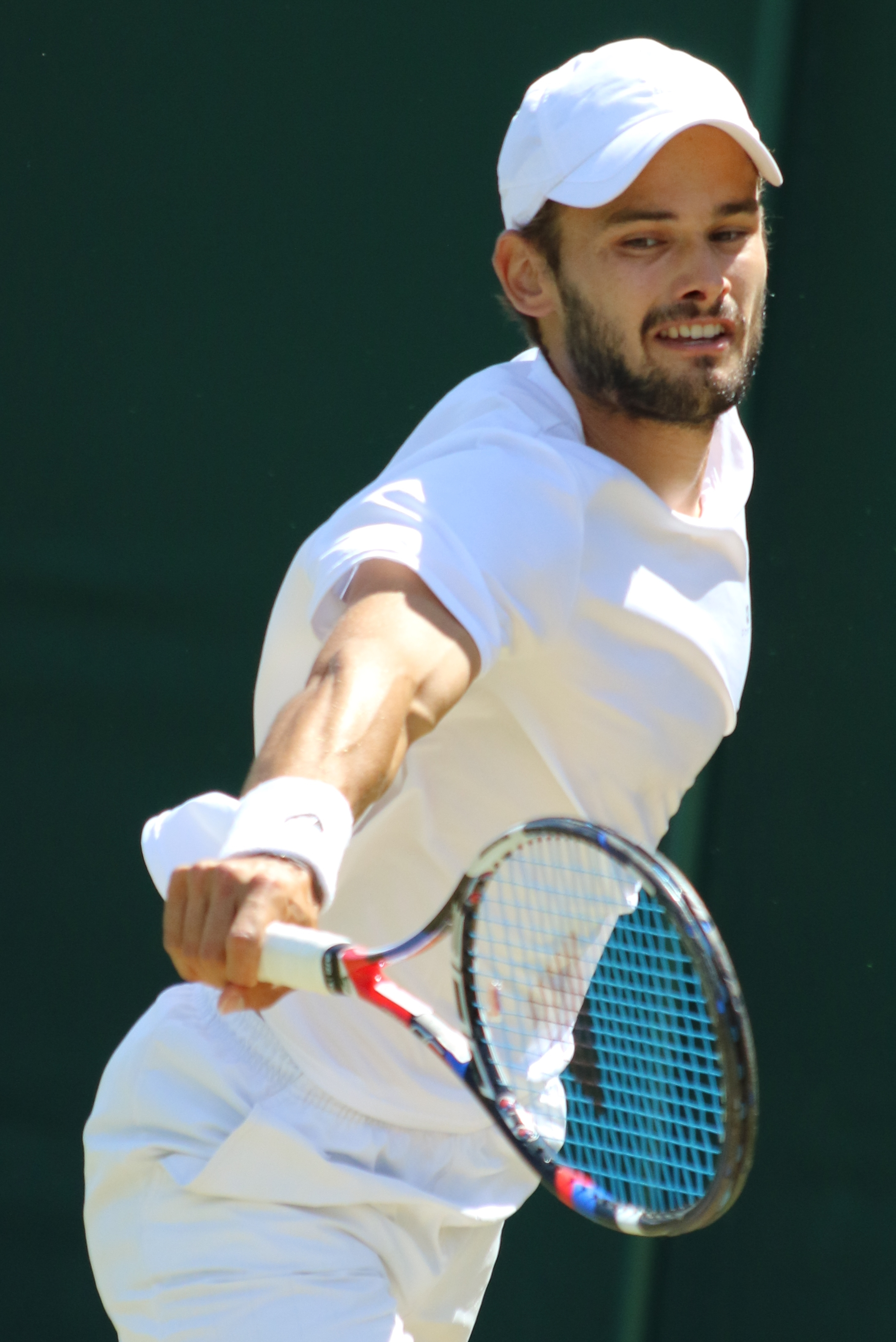
- Nys at the 2017 Wimbledon Championships
- Country (sports): France (2012−2019); Monaco (2019–)
- Residence: Monte Carlo, Monaco
- Born: 16 February 1991 (age 35) Évian-les-Bains, France
- Height: 6 ft 1 in (185 cm)
- Turned pro: 2010
- Plays: Right-handed (one-handed backhand)
- Coach: Mariusz Fyrstenberg, Kevin Blandy, Guillaume Couillard
- Prize money: US$ 2,181,525

Singles
- Career record: 1–1
- Highest ranking: No. 327 (29 July 2019)

Doubles
- Career record: 177–163
- Career titles: 9
- Highest ranking: No. 12 (12 June 2023)
- Current ranking: No. 25 (16 June 2025)

Grand Slam doubles results
- Australian Open: F (2023)
- French Open: SF (2025)
- Wimbledon: QF (2025)
- US Open: QF (2022, 2023)

Grand Slam mixed doubles results
- Australian Open: 2R (2024, 2025, 2026)
- French Open: 1R (2022, 2023, 2024, 2025, 2026)
- Wimbledon: 1R (2018, 2023, 2024, 2026)
- US Open: QF (2023)

Team competitions
- Davis Cup: 1–1
- Last updated on: 16 June 2025.

Hugo Nys (French pronunciation: [yɡo nis]; born 16 February 1991) is a Monégasque professional tennis player who previously represented France until 2019. A doubles specialist, he reached his highest ATP doubles ranking of No. 12 on 12 June 2023 and singles ranking of No. 327 on 29 July 2019. He became the first ever Monegasque player to reach the semifinal and final of a Major at the 2023 Australian Open.

His grandfather was Francis Nys, a French tennis player.

== Career ==
=== 2019: Maiden ATP title ===
At the 2019 Los Cabos Open, Nys won his maiden doubles title with partner Romain Arneodo.

=== 2021: French Open quarterfinal, two doubles titles, top 50 ===
Nys won his second doubles title at the Estoril Open, with partner Tim Pütz.

Later in May, Nys won his next doubles title at the Lyon Open, again with Pütz. As a result, he reached a career-high of No. 53 in doubles on 24 May 2021.

The Nys/Pütz duo reached the quarterfinals of the 2021 French Open, where they were defeated by eventual runner-ups Kazakh duo Bublik/Golubev.

=== 2022: US Open quarterfinal, fourth ATP title ===
At the US Open, he reached the quarterfinals of a Grand Slam for the second time in his career with partner Jan Zieliński, defeating 10th seeded pair Jamie Murray/Bruno Soares and Ariel Behar/Gonzalo Escobar. The pair won their first title at the 2022 Moselle Open.

=== 2023: Historic Major final and Masters title, top 15 debut ===
With Zieliński, Nys reached his first Grand Slam final at the Australian Open, defeating second seeds Rajeev Ram and Joe Salisbury on the way. He became the first Monegasque player to reach a Grand Slam final. They were defeated by wildcard Australian pair of Jason Kubler and Rinky Hijikata in the championship match. He reached the top 20 on 13 February 2023.

Following their maiden Masters 1000 title in Rome, Nys reached a new career high ranking of No. 14 on 22 May 2023. He became the first Monégasque player to win an ATP Masters 1000 title.

At the 2023 Moselle Open in Metz the Monégasque/Polish pair defended their crown but came short of qualifying for the year-end 2023 ATP Finals, finishing ninth in the ATP race.

=== 2024: First ATP 500 title ===
At the 2024 Australian Open he reached the quarterfinals with Zielenski but they lost to the unseeded pair Dominik Koepfer and Yannick Hanfmann and could not defend their runner-up points from the previous year.

At the 2024 Abierto Mexicano Telcel in Acapulco he won his first ATP 500 title with Zielenski defeating top pair of Santiago Gonzalez and Neal Skupski.

=== 2025: New partnership, Marrakech final ===
Nys and new partner Edouard Roger-Vasselin reached the final at the 2025 Grand Prix Hassan II. At the next tournament, the 2025 Monte-Carlo Masters they defeated Jamie Murray and Rajeev Ram to advance to the round of 16. They lost to fourth seeds Kevin Krawietz and Tim Puetz in a close match tiebreak.

== Doubles performance timeline ==
Key
W	F	SF	QF	#R	RR	Q#	P#	DNQ	A	Z#	PO	G	S	B	NMS	NTI	P	NH

(W) winner; (F) finalist; (SF) semifinalist; (QF) quarterfinalist; (#R) rounds 4, 3, 2, 1; (RR) round-robin stage; (Q#) qualification round; (P#) preliminary round; (DNQ) did not qualify; (A) absent; (Z#) Davis/Fed Cup Zonal Group (with number indication) or (PO) play-off; (G) gold, (S) silver or (B) bronze Olympic/Paralympic medal; (NMS) not a Masters tournament; (NTI) not a Tier I tournament; (P) postponed; (NH) not held; (SR) strike rate (events won / competed); (W–L) win–loss record.
To avoid confusion and double counting, these charts are updated at the conclusion of a tournament or when the player's participation has ended.

=== Men's doubles ===
Country Tournament	France					(France) (Monaco) ^{1}	Monaco							Total	
Country Tournament	2014	2015	2016	2017	2018	2019	2020	2021	2022	2023	2024	2025	2026	SR	W–L
Grand Slam tournaments
Australian Open	A	A	A	A	2R	1R	3R	1R	1R	F	QF	QF	1R	0 / 9	14–9
French Open	1R	A	A	1R	2R	A	2R	QF	3R	2R	3R	SF	QF	0 / 10	17–10
Wimbledon	A	A	A	3R	1R	2R	NH	1R	2R	3R	1R	QF		0 / 8	9–8
US Open	A	A	A	A	1R	1R	A	2R	QF	QF	2R	3R		0 / 7	10–7
Win–loss	0–1	0–0	0–0	2–2	2–4	1–3	3–2	4–4	6–4	11–4	6–4	12–4	3–2	0 / 32	47–32
ATP Masters Series
Indian Wells Masters	A	A	A	A	A	A	NH	A	A	1R	1R	2R	1R	0 / 4	1–4
Miami Open	A	A	A	A	A	A	NH	A	A	1R	2R	2R	QF	0 / 4	4–4
Monte-Carlo Masters	A	A	A	SF	2R	1R	NH	1R	1R	1R	1R	1R	SF	0 / 9	8–9
Madrid Open	A	A	A	A	A	A	NH	A	A	2R	QF	1R	1R	0 / 4	3–4
Italian Open	A	A	A	A	A	A	A	A	A	W	2R	1R	2R	1 / 4	7–3
Canadian Open	A	A	A	A	A	A	NH	A	A	1R	SF	2R		0 / 3	3–3
Cincinnati Open	A	A	A	A	A	A	A	A	A	1R	2R	2R		0 / 3	2–3
Shanghai Open	A	A	A	A	A	A	NH			1R	1R	1R		0 / 3	0–3
Paris Masters	A	A	A	A	A	A	1R	A	1R	1R	2R	2R		0 / 5	2–5
Win–loss	0–0	0–0	0–0	3–1	1–1	0–1	0–1	0–1	0–2	6–8	8–8	6–8	6–5	1 / 38	30–37
Career statistics
Titles	0	0	0	0	0	1	0	2	1	2	1	1	1	9	
Finals	0	0	0	0	1	1	0	4	2	4	2	4	1	19	
Year-end ranking	329	360	234	91	80	66	66	44	41	15	24	18		$2,740,940	

^{1} Hugo Nys represented France till 2019 Verrazzano Open, from 2019 Monte-Carlo Masters onwards he has represented Monaco.

=== Mixed doubles ===
Tournament	2018	...	2022	2023	2024	2025	2026	SR	W–L
Australian Open	A		1R	1R	2R	2R	2R	0 / 4	3–4
French Open	A		1R	1R	1R	1R	1R	0 / 5	0–5
Wimbledon	1R		A	1R	1R	A		0 / 3	0–3
US Open	A		A	QF	2R	A		0 / 2	3–2

=== Grand Slam tournament finals ===
==== Men's Doubles: 1 (1 runner-up) ====
Result	Year	Tournament	Surface	Partner	Opponents	Score
Loss	2023	Australian Open	Hard	(Poland) Jan Zieliński	(Australia) Rinky Hijikata (Australia) Jason Kubler	4–6, 6–7^{(4–7)}

== ATP Tour finals ==
=== Doubles: 19 (9 titles, 10 runner-ups) ===
Legend Grand Slam tournaments (0–1) ATP World Tour Finals (0–0) ATP World Tour Masters 1000 (1–0) ATP World Tour 500 Series (2–3) ATP World Tour 250 Series (6–6)	Finals by surface Hard (5–8) Clay (3–2) Grass (1–0)	Finals by setting Outdoor (7–5) Indoor (2–5)

Result	W–L	Date	Tournament	Tier	Surface	Partner	Opponents	Score
Loss	0–1	Feb 2018	Open Sud de France, France	250 Series	Hard (i)	(Japan) Ben McLachlan	(United Kingdom) Ken Skupski (United Kingdom) Neal Skupski	6–7^{(2–7)}, 4–6
Win	1–1	Aug 2019	Los Cabos Open, Mexico	250 Series	Hard	(Monaco) Romain Arneodo	(United Kingdom) Dominic Inglot (United States) Austin Krajicek	7–5, 5–7, [16–14]
Win	2–1	May 2021	Estoril Open, Portugal	250 Series	Clay	(Germany) Tim Pütz	(United Kingdom) Luke Bambridge (United Kingdom) Dominic Inglot	7–5, 3–6, [10–3]
Win	3–1	May 2021	Lyon Open, France	250 Series	Clay	(Germany) Tim Pütz	(France) Pierre-Hugues Herbert (France) Nicolas Mahut	6–4, 5–7, [10–8]
Loss	3–2	Sep 2021	Moselle Open, France	250 Series	Hard (i)	(France) Arthur Rinderknech	(Poland) Hubert Hurkacz (Poland) Jan Zieliński	5–7, 3–6
Loss	3–3	Oct 2021	St. Petersburg Open, Russia	250 Series	Hard (i)	(Kazakhstan) Andrey Golubev	(United Kingdom) Jamie Murray (Brazil) Bruno Soares	3–6, 4–6
Loss	3–4	Aug 2022	Winston-Salem Open, United States	250 Series	Hard	(Poland) Jan Zieliński	(Australia) Matthew Ebden (United Kingdom) Jamie Murray	4–6, 2–6
Win	4–4	Sep 2022	Moselle Open, France	250 Series	Hard (i)	(Poland) Jan Zieliński	(United Kingdom) Lloyd Glasspool (Finland) Harri Heliövaara	7–6^{(7–5)}, 6–4
Loss	4–5	Jan 2023	Australian Open, Australia	Grand Slam	Hard	(Poland) Jan Zieliński	(Australia) Rinky Hijikata (Australia) Jason Kubler	4–6, 6–7^{(4–7)}
Win	5–5	May 2023	Rome Masters, Italy	Masters 1000	Clay	(Poland) Jan Zieliński	(Netherlands) Robin Haase (Netherlands) Botic van de Zandschulp	7–5, 6–1
Loss	5–6	Oct 2023	Swiss Indoors, Switzerland	500 Series	Hard (i)	(Poland) Jan Zieliński	(Mexico) Santiago González (France) Édouard Roger-Vasselin	7–6^{(10–8)}, 6–7^{(3–7)}, [1–10]
Win	6–6	Nov 2023	Moselle Open, France (2)	250 Series	Hard (i)	(Poland) Jan Zieliński	(Germany) Constantin Frantzen (Germany) Hendrik Jebens	6–4, 6–4
Win	7–6	Mar 2024	Mexican Open, Mexico	500 Series	Hard	(Poland) Jan Zieliński	(Mexico) Santiago González (United Kingdom) Neal Skupski	6–3, 6–2
Loss	7–7	Apr 2024	Barcelona Open, Spain	500 Series	Clay	(Poland) Jan Zieliński	(Argentina) Máximo González (Argentina) Andrés Molteni	6–4, 4–6, [9–11]
Loss	7–8	Apr 2025	Grand Prix Hassan II, Morocco	250 Series	Clay	(France) Édouard Roger-Vasselin	(Czech Republic) Patrik Rikl (Czech Republic) Petr Nouza	3–6, 4–6
Loss	7–9	Jul 2025	Washington Open, United States	500 Series	Hard	(France) Édouard Roger-Vasselin	(Italy) Simone Bolelli (Italy) Andrea Vavassori	3–6, 4–6
Win	8–9	Sep 2025	Japan Open, Japan	500 Series	Hard	(France) Édouard Roger-Vasselin	(India) Rohan Bopanna (Japan) Takeru Yuzuki	7–5, 7–5
Loss	8–10	Oct 2025	European Open, Belgium	250 Series	Hard (i)	(France) Édouard Roger-Vasselin	(United States) Christian Harrison (United States) Evan King	6–7^{(10–12)}, 6–7^{(5–7)}
Win	9–10	Jun 2026	Eastbourne International, United Kingdom	250 Series	Grass	(France) Édouard Roger-Vasselin	(Argentina) Guido Andreozzi (France) Manuel Guinard	6–3, 4–6, [10–8]

== ATP Challenger and ITF Tour finals ==
=== Singles: 12 (6–6) ===
Legend (singles) ATP Challenger Tour (0–0) ITF Futures Tour (6–6)	Titles by surface Hard (5–6) Clay (0–0) Grass (0–0) Carpet (1–0)

Result	W–L	Date	Tournament	Tier	Surface	Opponent	Score
Win	1–0	Sep 2012	Sweden F4, Uppsala	Futures	Hard (i)	(Sweden) Robin Olin	6–0, 5–7, 6–3
Loss	1–1	May 2013	Turkey F20, Antalya	Futures	Hard	(Croatia) Mate Delić	6–3, 5–7, 4–6
Loss	1–2	Sep 2013	France F14, Bagnères-de-Bigorre	Futures	Hard	(France) Alexandre Penaud	6–1, 4–6, 4–6
Win	2–2	Apr 2014	Turkey F12, Antalya	Futures	Hard	(Germany) Robin Kern	6–0, 6–2
Win	3–2	Jul 2014	Turkey F23, Istanbul	Futures	Hard	(Bosnia and Herzegovina) Aldin Šetkić	6–4, 6–3
Win	4–2	Jul 2014	Turkey F24, Istanbul	Futures	Hard	(Croatia) Matija Pecotić	7–6^{(7–5)}, 3–6, 7–6^{(7–4)}
Loss	4–3	Jan 2015	Turkey F1, Antalya	Futures	Hard	(Japan) Shuichi Sekiguchi	7–6^{(11–9)}, 4–6, 3–6
Loss	4–4	Apr 2015	Turkey F16, Antalya	Futures	Hard	(France) Yannick Jankovits	7–6^{(7–4)}, 0–6, 1–6
Win	5–4	Jun 2015	Egypt F21, Sharm El Sheikh	Futures	Hard	(Spain) Javier Pulgar-García	6–3, 6–1
Loss	5–5	Jan 2016	France F2, Bressuire	Futures	Hard (i)	(France) Constant Lestienne	7–6^{(7–4)}, 1–6, 4–6
Win	6–5	Jan 2016	France F3, Veigy-Foncenex	Futures	Carpet (i)	(Netherlands) Antal van der Duim	6–4, 6–3
Loss	6–6	Sep 2016	France F17, Bagnères-de-Bigorre	Futures	Hard	(Belgium) Maxime Authom	6–4, 6–7^{(9–11)}, 0–6

=== Doubles: 72 (38–34) ===
Legend (doubles) ATP Challenger Tour (11–14) ITF Futures Tour (27–20)	Titles by surface Hard (32–18) Clay (6–12) Grass (0–0) Carpet (0–4)

Result	W–L	Date	Tournament	Tier	Surface	Partner	Opponents	Score
Loss	0–1	Oct 2009	France F18, Saint-Dizier	Futures	Hard (i)	(France) Jérémy Corbière	(France) Baptiste Bayet (France) Grégoire Burquier	3–6, 1–6
Loss	0–2	Jun 2012	Spain F17, Melilla	Futures	Hard	(France) Jules Marie	(Spain) Iván Arenas-Gualda (Spain) Jaime Pulgar-García	7–6^{(8–6)}, 1–6, [7–10]
Loss	0–3	Jul 2012	France F12, Montauban	Futures	Clay	(France) Pierre-Hugues Herbert	(France) Jonathan Eysseric (France) Nicolas Renavand	7–6^{(7–3)}, 4–6, [9–11]
Win	1–3	Aug 2012	Belgium F7, Eupen	Futures	Clay	(France) Teri Groll	(Belgium) Germain Gigounon (Belgium) James Junior Storme	6–4, 6–3
Loss	1–4	Sep 2012	France F18, Sarreguemines	Futures	Carpet (i)	(South Africa) Jean Andersen	(France) Julien Obry (France) Alexandre Penaud	6–2, 1–6, [8–10]
Win	2–4	Oct 2012	France F21, La Roche-sur-Yon	Futures	Hard (i)	(South Africa) Jean Andersen	(Germany) Moritz Baumann (Germany) Tim Pütz	7–6^{(8–6)}, 7–6^{(7–3)}
Win	3–4	Mar 2013	France F6, Saint-Raphaël	Futures	Hard (i)	(France) Romain Arneodo	(France) Simon Cauvard (France) Alexandre Penaud	6–7^{(6–8)}, 6–4, [10–5]
Win	4–4	May 2013	Turkey F20, Antalya	Futures	Hard	(France) Davy Sum	(Italy) Claudio Fortuna (Italy) Matthieu Viérin	6–2, 6–0
Loss	4–5	Jun 2013	Serbia F2, Belgrade	Futures	Clay	(France) Romain Arneodo	(Slovakia) Patrik Fabian (Slovakia) Adrian Partl	4–6, 1–6
Win	5–5	Jun 2013	France F10, Toulon	Futures	Clay	(Monaco) Benjamin Balleret	(France) David Couronne (France) Vincent Verpeaux	7–5, 6–4
Win	6–5	Sep 2013	France F14, Bagnères-de-Bigorre	Futures	Hard	(France) Antoine Benneteau	(Italy) Riccardo Ghedin (Italy) Claudio Grassi	6–3, 4–6, [10–2]
Win	7–5	Sep 2013	Sweden F4, Gothenburg	Futures	Hard (i)	(Sweden) Jesper Brunström	(Sweden) Pierre Bonfre (Sweden) Viktor Stjern	6–3, 7–6^{(7–5)}
Win	8–5	Oct 2013	France F19, Saint-Dizier	Futures	Hard (i)	(Belgium) Germain Gigounon	(United Kingdom) David Rice (United Kingdom) Sean Thornley	7–6^{(7–4)}, 6–4
Win	9–5	Oct 2013	Mouilleron-le-Captif, France	Challenger	Hard (i)	(France) Fabrice Martin	(Finland) Henri Kontinen (Spain) Adrián Menéndez Maceiras	3–6, 6–3, [10–8]
Loss	9–6	Feb 2014	Italy F2, Rovereto	Futures	Carpet (i)	(France) Fabrice Martin	(Italy) Marco Crugnola (Italy) Luca Vanni	4–6, 4–6
Loss	9–7	Mar 2014	France F7, Saint-Raphaël	Futures	Hard (i)	(France) Fabrice Martin	(Monaco) Romain Arneodo (Monaco) Benjamin Balleret	2–6, 6–7^{(2–7)}
Loss	9–8	Jun 2014	Croatia F13, Bol	Futures	Clay	(Germany) Tim Nekic	(Argentina) Gastón-Arturo Grimolizzi (Italy) Giorgio Portaluri	3–6, 4–6
Win	10–8	Jul 2014	Turkey F23, Istanbul	Futures	Hard	(Bolivia) Federico Zeballos	(Turkey) Tuna Altuna (Czech Republic) Michal Schmid	7–6^{(7–3)}, 3–6, [10–3]
Win	11–8	Jul 2014	Belgium F7, Middelkerke	Futures	Hard	(France) Élie Rousset	(France) Éric Fomba (France) Florian Lakat	6–3, 6–1
Loss	11–9	Aug 2014	Belarus F1, Minsk	Futures	Hard	(Australia) Dane Propoggia	(Belarus) Sergey Betov (Belarus) Aliaksandr Bury	6–7^{(0–7)}, 6–7^{(5–7)}
Loss	11–10	Aug 2014	Belarus F2, Minsk	Futures	Hard	(Australia) Dane Propoggia	(Belarus) Sergey Betov (Belarus) Aliaksandr Bury	3–6, 5–7
Loss	11–11	Sep 2014	France F20, Sarreguemines	Futures	Carpet (i)	(France) Élie Rousset	(Italy) Erik Crepaldi (Germany) Pirmin Haenle	6–7^{(5–7)}, 6–7^{(3–7)}
Win	12–11	Oct 2014	France F21, Nevers	Futures	Hard (i)	(France) Olivier Charroin	(Netherlands) Romano Frantzen (United Kingdom) Darren Walsh	6–4, 6–4
Loss	12–12	Mar 2015	France F5, Balma	Futures	Hard (i)	(France) Alexandre Sidorenko	(France) Romain Bauvy (France) Yanais Laurent	3–6, 6–7^{(4–7)}
Loss	12–13	Mar 2015	Tunisia F10, El Kantaoui	Futures	Hard	(Monaco) Benjamin Balleret	(Italy) Thomas Fabbiano (Italy) Giorgio Portaluri	2–6, 6–7^{(3–7)}
Win	13–13	Mar 2015	Tunisia F11, El Kantaoui	Futures	Hard	(Monaco) Benjamin Balleret	(Italy) Thomas Fabbiano (Italy) Giorgio Portaluri	7–5, 2–6, [10–4]
Win	14–13	Apr 2015	Turkey F16, Antalya	Futures	Hard	(France) Yannick Jankovits	(Ukraine) Marat Deviatiarov (Belgium) Michael Geerts	7–6^{(8–6)}, 6–1
Loss	14–14	May 2015	Turkey F17, Antalya	Futures	Hard	(Switzerland) Antoine Bellier	(Austria) Lucas Miedler (Austria) Maximilian Neuchrist	6–4, 3–6, [7–10]
Loss	14–15	Jun 2015	Egypt F21, Sharm El Sheikh	Futures	Hard	(Spain) Jaime Pulgar-García	(Chile) Juan Matías González Carrasco (Argentina) Emiliano Franco Vecchia	6–7^{(4–7)}, 7–5, [5–10]
Win	15–15	Jun 2015	France F10, Mont-de-Marsan	Futures	Hard (i)	(Monaco) Romain Arneodo	(France) Théo Fournerie (France) Louis Tessa	6–1, 7–5
Win	16–15	Jul 2015	Turkey F26, Istanbul	Futures	Hard	(France) Yannick Jankovits	(Turkey) Sarp Ağabigün (Turkey) Muhammet Haylaz	2–6, 7–5, [10–6]
Win	17–15	Aug 2015	France F16, Ajaccio	Futures	Hard	(Monaco) Romain Arneodo	(Thailand) Sanchai Ratiwatana (Thailand) Sonchat Ratiwatana	2–6, 6–4, [10–5]
Win	18–15	Aug 2015	Switzerland F4, Sion	Futures	Clay	(France) Tak Khunn Wang	(Argentina) Federico Coria (Switzerland) Siméon Rossier	6–2, 6–2
Win	19–15	May 2016	Turkey F18, Antalya	Futures	Hard	(Latvia) Miķelis Lībietis	(Turkey) Sarp Ağabigün (Turkey) Altuğ Çelikbilek	6–2, 6–2
Win	20–15	May 2016	Turkey F19, Antalya	Futures	Hard	(Latvia) Miķelis Lībietis	(Japan) Katsuki Nagao (Japan) Hiromasa Oku	4–6, 6–2, [10–3]
Win	21–15	Jun 2016	Zimbabwe F1, Harare	Futures	Hard	(Italy) Andrea Vavassori	(Zimbabwe) Benjamin Lock (Zimbabwe) Courtney John Lock	6–3, 6–3
Win	22–15	Jul 2016	Zimbabwe F2, Harare	Futures	Hard	(India) Vishnu Vardhan	(South Africa) Nicolaas Scholtz (South Africa) Tucker Vorster	6–4, 6–2
Win	23–15	Jul 2016	Zimbabwe F3, Harare	Futures	Hard	(India) Vishnu Vardhan	(Zimbabwe) Benjamin Lock (Zimbabwe) Courtney John Lock	6–7^{(5–7)}, 6–4, [10–5]
Win	24–15	Jul 2016	France F16, Ajaccio	Futures	Hard	(Monaco) Romain Arneodo	(France) Romain Jouan (France) Joan Soler	7–5, 6–2
Win	25–15	Aug 2016	Spain F24, Béjar	Futures	Hard	(Belgium) Yannick Mertens	(United States) Alexander Centenari (Germany) Sami Reinwein	6–4, 7–6^{(7–3)}
Loss	25–16	Aug 2016	Switzerland F3, Collonge-Bellerive	Futures	Clay	(Switzerland) Antoine Bellier	(Portugal) Gonçalo Oliveira (France) Fabien Reboul	3–6, 5–7
Loss	25–17	Sep 2016	France F18, Mulhouse	Futures	Hard (i)	(Belgium) Maxime Authom	(Germany) Andreas Beck (France) Grégoire Jacq	4–6, 3–6
Win	26–17	Oct 2016	France F22, Saint-Dizier	Futures	Hard (i)	(France) Mick Lescure	(France) Geoffrey Blancaneaux (France) Evan Furness	6–2, 6–3
Loss	26–18	Oct 2016	Pune, India	Challenger	Hard	(Switzerland) Luca Margaroli	(India) Purav Raja (India) Divij Sharan	6–3, 3–6, [9–11]
Loss	26–19	Jan 2017	France F1, Bagnoles-de-l'Orne	Futures	Clay (i)	(France) Grégoire Jacq	(France) Constant Lestienne (France) Alexis Musialek	6–3, 5–7, [8–10]
Win	27–19	Jan 2017	France F2, Bressuire	Futures	Hard (i)	(France) Corentin Denolly	(Croatia) Ante Pavić (South Africa) Ruan Roelofse	6–4, 6–2
Win	28–19	Mar 2017	Canada F1, Gatineau	Futures	Hard (i)	(Latvia) Miķelis Lībietis	(France) Grégoire Barrère (France) Laurent Lokoli	7–6^{(7–4)}, 6–3
Loss	28–20	Mar 2017	Canada F2, Sherbrooke	Futures	Hard (i)	(Latvia) Miķelis Lībietis	(Sweden) Isak Arvidsson (Denmark) Frederik Nielsen	0–6, 4–6
Loss	28–21	May 2017	France F10, Grasse	Futures	Clay	(France) Grégoire Jacq	(France) Maxime Chazal (France) Louis Tessa	2–6, 6–1, [7–10]
Win	29–21	Aug 2017	Manerbio, Italy	Challenger	Clay	(Monaco) Romain Arneodo	(Russia) Mikhail Elgin (Czech Republic) Roman Jebavý	4–6, 7–6^{(7–3)}, [10–5]
Loss	29–22	Sep 2017	Istanbul, Turkey	Challenger	Hard	(Monaco) Romain Arneodo	(Germany) Andre Begemann (France) Jonathan Eysseric	3–6, 7–5, [4–10]
Win	30–22	Jan 2018	Nouméa, New Caledonia	Challenger	Hard	(Germany) Tim Pütz	(Colombia) Alejandro González (Spain) Jaume Munar	6–2, 6–2
Win	31–22	Mar 2018	Lille, France	Challenger	Hard	(Germany) Tim Pütz	(India) Jeevan Nedunchezhiyan (India) Purav Raja	7–6^{(7–3)}, 1–6, [10–7]
Loss	31–23	Sep 2018	Cary, USA	Challenger	Hard	(France) Fabrice Martin	(United States) Evan King (United States) Hunter Reese	4–6, 6–7^{(6–8)}
Loss	31–24	Nov 2018	Eckental, Germany	Challenger	Carpet (i)	(United Kingdom) Jonny O'Mara	(Germany) Kevin Krawietz (Germany) Andreas Mies	1–6, 4–6
Win	32–24	Jan 2019	Canberra, Australia	Challenger	Hard	(Brazil) Marcelo Demoliner	(Sweden) André Göransson (Netherlands) Sem Verbeek	3–6, 6–4, [10–3]
Win	33–24	Feb 2019	Quimper, France	Challenger	Hard (i)	(France) Fabrice Martin	(Netherlands) David Pel (Croatia) Antonio Šančić	6–4, 6–2
Win	34–24	Mar 2019	Lille, France	Challenger	Hard	(Monaco) Romain Arneodo	(Israel) Jonathan Erlich (France) Fabrice Martin	7–5, 5–7, [10–8]
Loss	34–25	Apr 2019	Bordeaux, France	Challenger	Clay	(Monaco) Romain Arneodo	(France) Quentin Halys (France) Grégoire Barrère	4–6, 1–6
Loss	34–26	Jul 2019	Granby, Canada	Challenger	Hard	(China) Li Zhe	(Sweden) André Göransson (Netherlands) Sem Verbeek	2–6, 4–6
Win	35–26	Sep 2019	Orleans, France	Challenger	Hard (i)	(Monaco) Romain Arneodo	(Chile) Hans Podlipnik Castillo (Austria) Tristan-Samuel Weissborn	6–7^{(5–7)}, 6–3, [10–1]
Loss	35–27	Sep 2020	Cordenons, Italy	Challenger	Clay	(Argentina) Andrés Molteni	(Uruguay) Ariel Behar (Kazakhstan) Andrey Golubev	5–7, 4–6
Win	36–27	Sep 2020	Aix-en-Provence, France	Challenger	Clay	(Argentina) Andrés Molteni	(Uruguay) Ariel Behar (Ecuador) Gonzalo Escobar	6–4, 7–6^{(7–4)}
Win	37–27	Feb 2021	Biella, Italy	Challenger	Hard (i)	(Germany) Tim Pütz	(United Kingdom) Lloyd Glasspool (Finland) Harri Heliövaara	7–6^{(7–4)}, 6–3
Loss	37–28	Apr 2021	Marbella, Spain	Challenger	Clay	(Monaco) Romain Arneodo	(United Kingdom) Dominic Inglot (Australia) Matt Reid	6–1, 3–6, [6–10]
Win	38–28	Mar 2022	Roseto degli Abruzzi, Italy	Challenger	Clay	(Poland) Jan Zieliński	(Czech Republic) Roman Jebavý (Austria) Philipp Oswald	7–6^{(7–2)}, 4–6, [10–3]
Loss	38–29	Mar 2022	Marbella, Spain	Challenger	Clay	(Poland) Jan Zieliński	(Czech Republic) Roman Jebavý (Austria) Philipp Oswald	6–7^{(6–8)}, 6–3, [3–10]
Loss	38–30	May 2022	Bordeaux, France	Challenger	Clay	(Poland) Jan Zieliński	(Brazil) Rafael Matos (Spain) David Vega Hernández	4-6, 0-6
Loss	38–31	Aug 2022	Grodzisk Mazowiecki, Poland	Challenger	Hard	(France) Fabien Reboul	(Netherlands) Robin Haase (Austria) Philipp Oswald	3–6, 4–6
Loss	38–32	Mar 2023	Phoenix, USA	Challenger	Hard	(Poland) Jan Zieliński	(United States) Nathaniel Lammons (United States) Jackson Withrow	7–6^{(7–1)}, 4–6, [8–10]
Loss	38–33	Apr 2025	Aix-en-Provence, France	Challenger	Clay	(France) Théo Arribagé	(United States) Robert Cash (United States) JJ Tracy	5–7, 6–7^{(5–7)}
Loss	38–34	Mar 2026	Phoenix, USA	Challenger	Hard	(France) Édouard Roger-Vasselin	(Ecuador) Diego Hidalgo (United States) Patrik Trhac	7–6^{(8–6)}, 3–6, [4–10]
