= Arènes de Metz =

Indoor sports arena in Metz, France

Coordinates: 49.1088914°N 6.1841199°E

Palais Omnisports Les Arènes
- Arènes de Metz
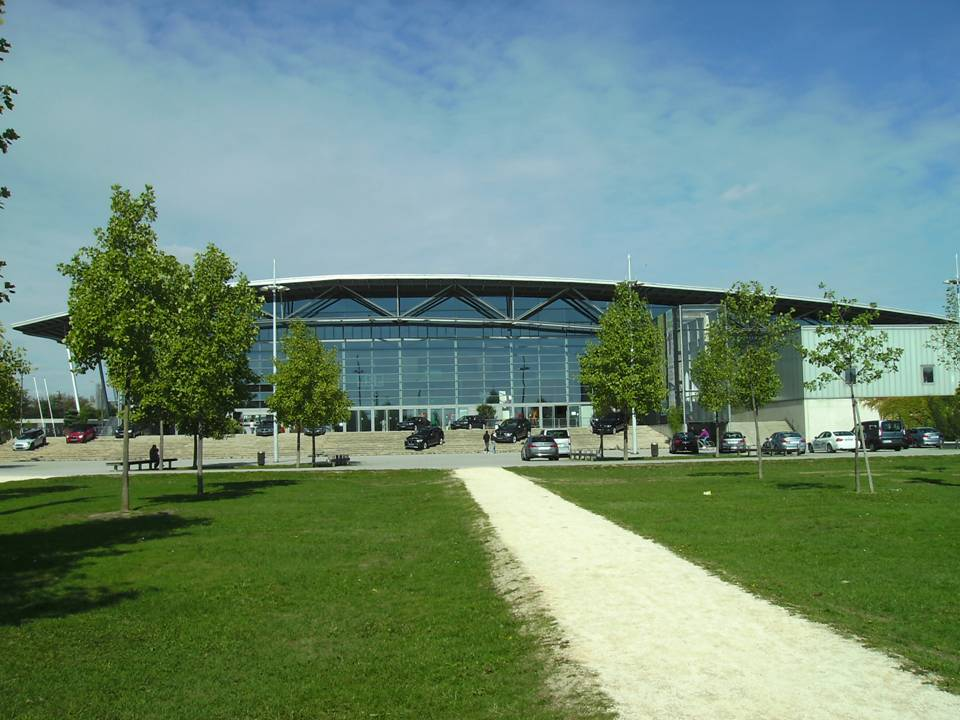
- Interactive map of Palais Omnisports Les Arènes
- Location: 5 avenue Louis-le-Débonnaire; 57000; Metz, France
- Capacity: 5,300
- Surface: 16 850 m^{2}

Construction
- Groundbreaking: 2000
- Built: 2001
- Opened: 7 February 2002
- Architect: Paul Chemetov

Tenant
- Metz Handball (handball) (2001–present)

The Palais omnisport Les Arènes, often abbreviated as Les Arènes, is an indoor sports arena in Metz, France. It is the home venue of the Metz Handball team. It is also the home of the Open Metz–Grand Est, an annual tennis event. Until 2026, it was the home of the Open de Moselle tennis tournament, part of the ATP Tour 250 series of the ATP Tour. Currently the arena has a capacity of 4,500 seats.

== See also ==
- List of tennis stadiums by capacity
