= David Goffin career statistics =

Career finals
Discipline	Type	Won	Lost	Total	WR
Singles	Grand Slam	–	–	–	–
Singles	Olympic Games	–	–	–	–
Singles	ATP Finals	–	1	1	0.00
Singles	ATP Masters 1000	–	1	1	0.00
Singles	ATP 500	1	4	5	0.20
Singles	ATP 250	5	3	8	0.63
Singles	Total	6	9	15	0.40
Doubles	Grand Slam	–	–	–	–
Doubles	Olympic Games	–	–	–	–
Doubles	ATP Finals	–	–	–	–
Doubles	ATP Masters 1000	–	–	–	–
Doubles	ATP 500	–	–	–	–
Doubles	ATP 250	1	–	1	1.00
Doubles	Total	1	–	1	1.00
Total		7	9	15	0.44

This is a list of main career statistics of Belgian professional tennis player David Goffin. All statistics are according to the ATP Tour and ITF websites.

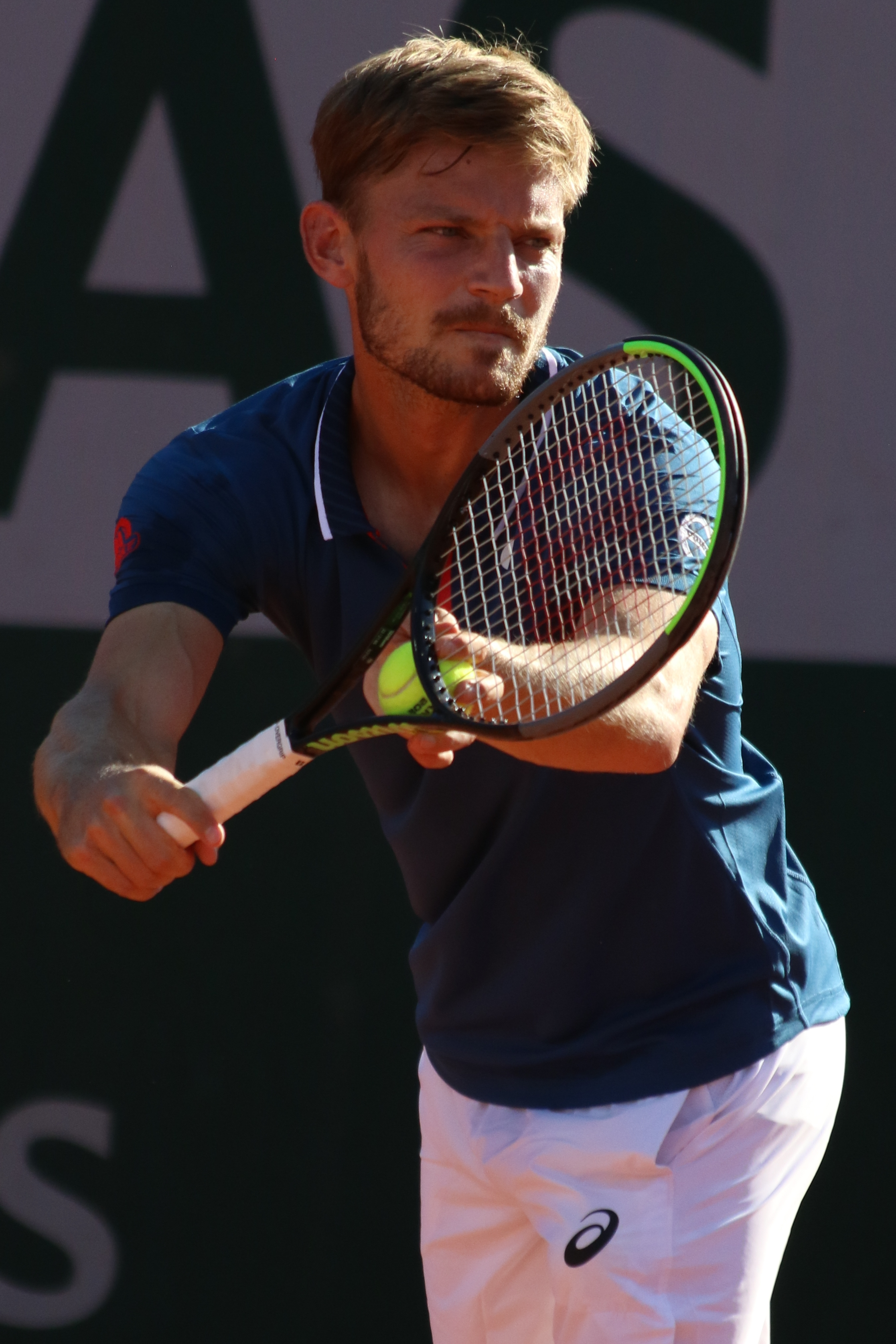
Goffin at the 2021 French Open.

== Performance timelines ==
Key
W	F	SF	QF	#R	RR	Q#	P#	DNQ	A	Z#	PO	G	S	B	NMS	NTI	P	NH

(W) winner; (F) finalist; (SF) semifinalist; (QF) quarterfinalist; (#R) rounds 4, 3, 2, 1; (RR) round-robin stage; (Q#) qualification round; (P#) preliminary round; (DNQ) did not qualify; (A) absent; (Z#) Davis/Fed Cup Zonal Group (with number indication) or (PO) play-off; (G) gold, (S) silver or (B) bronze Olympic/Paralympic medal; (NMS) not a Masters tournament; (NTI) not a Tier I tournament; (P) postponed; (NH) not held; (SR) strike rate (events won / competed); (W–L) win–loss record.
To avoid confusion and double counting, these charts are updated at the conclusion of a tournament or when the player's participation has ended.

=== Singles ===
Tournament	2009	2010	2011	2012	2013	2014	2015	2016	2017	2018	2019	2020	2021	2022	2023	2024	2025	2026	SR	W–L	Win%
Grand Slam tournaments
Australian Open	A	A	Q1	Q2	1R	A	2R	4R	QF	2R	3R	3R	1R	1R	A	1R	1R	A	0 / 11	13–11	54%
French Open	A	A	A	4R	1R	1R	3R	QF	3R	4R	3R	1R	1R	3R	1R	2R	A		0 / 13	19–13	59%
Wimbledon	A	A	Q3	3R	1R	1R	4R	4R	A	1R	QF	NH	A	QF	3R	1R	1R		0 / 10	18–11	62%
US Open	A	A	Q3	1R	1R	3R	3R	1R	4R	4R	4R	4R	1R	1R	Q1	3R	2R		0 / 13	19–13	59%
Win–loss	0–0	0–0	0–0	5–3	0–4	2–3	8–4	10–4	9–3	7–4	11–4	5–3	0–3	6–4	2–2	3–4	1–3	0–0	0 / 48	69–48	59%
Year-end championships
ATP Finals	DNQ							RR	F	DNQ									0 / 2	3–3	50%
National representation
Summer Olympics	NH			1R	NH			3R	NH				A	NH		A	NH		0 / 2	2–2	50%
Davis Cup	A	A	A	PO	1R	1R	F	1R	F	QF	RR	A		RR	WG1	A	A		0 / 8	29–6	83%
ATP 1000 tournaments
Indian Wells Open	A	A	A	A	2R	1R	A	SF	4R	A	2R	NH	A	1R	A	1R	2R	Q1	0 / 8	8–8	50%
Miami Open	A	A	A	2R	3R	1R	4R	SF	4R	2R	4R	NH	2R	2R	A	Q2	3R	A	0 / 11	16–11	59%
Monte-Carlo Masters	A	A	A	A	1R	1R	2R	3R	SF	QF	2R	NH	QF	3R	1R	Q1	Q2		0 / 10	15–10	60%
Madrid Open	A	A	A	A	1R	A	2R	1R	QF	3R	1R	NH	A	3R	1R	Q1	1R		0 / 9	7–9	44%
Italian Open	A	A	A	A	A	A	QF	QF	3R	QF	2R	2R	2R	2R	2R	A	A		0 / 9	14–9	61%
Canadian Open	A	A	A	A	1R	A	3R	3R	2R	1R	1R	NH	A	1R	A	A	1R		0 / 8	4–8	33%
Cincinnati Open	A	A	A	Q2	3R	A	3R	2R	1R	SF	F	3R	1R	1R	A	A	1R		0 / 10	14–10	58%
Shanghai Masters	A	A	A	A	A	A	2R	QF	2R	A	3R	NH			A	QF	3R		0 / 6	12–6	67%
Paris Masters	A	A	A	Q1	A	2R	3R	3R	3R	A	2R	2R	A	Q1	A	Q1	Q2		0 / 6	4–6	40%
Win–loss	0–0	0–0	0–0	1–1	5–6	1–4	12–8	19–9	15–9	10–6	10–9	1–3	4–4	6–7	1–3	4–2	5–6	0–0	0 / 77	94–77	55%
Career statistics
	2009	2010	2011	2012	2013	2014	2015	2016	2017	2018	2019	2020	2021	2022	2023	2024	2025	2026	Career		
Tournaments	0	0	2	14	22	16	24	25	25	16	26	10	16	26	13	16	22	0	Career total: 273		
Finals	0	0	0	0	0	3	2	1	5	0	2	0	1	1	0	0	0	0	Career total: 15		
Titles	0	0	0	0	0	2	0	0	2	0	0	0	1	1	0	0	0	0	Career total: 6		
Hard win–loss	0–0	0–0	2–2	10–7	8–13	19–10	20–14	32–18	43–17	17–9	20–18	12–9	9–9	11–19	5–6	15–10	8–18	0–0	4 / 177	231–179	56%
Clay win–loss	0–0	0–0	0–0	5–3	3–7	5–3	12–8	12–5	16–7	12–5	6–6	0–2	5–5	12–5	3–6	2–4	3–3	0–0	2 / 69	96–69	58%
Grass win–loss	0–0	0–0	0–0	2–4	0–3	1–2	6–3	5–2	0–0	0–2	10–3	0–0	0–1	4–2	2–2	0–2	0–1	0–0	0 / 27	30–27	53%
Overall win–loss	0–0	0–0	2–2	17–14	11–23	25–15	38–25	49–25	59–24	29–16	36–27	12–11	14–15	27–26	10–14	17–16	11–22	0–0	6 / 273	357–275	56%
Win %	–	–	50%	55%	32%	63%	60%	66%	71%	64%	57%	52%	48%	53%	42%	52%	33%	–	Career total: 56%		
Year-end ranking	324	229	174	46	110	22	16	11	7	22	11	15	39	53	107	52	119		$19,088,427		

== Significant finals ==
=== Year-end championships (ATP Finals) ===
==== Singles: 1 (1 runner-up) ====
Result	Year	Tournament	Surface	Opponent	Score
Loss	2017	ATP Finals, London	Hard (i)	(Bulgaria) Grigor Dimitrov	5–7, 6–4, 3–6

=== Masters 1000 tournaments ===
==== Singles: 1 (1 runner-up) ====
Result	Year	Tournament	Surface	Opponent	Score
Loss	2019	Cincinnati Open	Hard	(Russia) Daniil Medvedev	6–7^{(3–7)}, 4–6

== ATP Tour finals ==
=== Singles: 15 (6 titles, 9 runner-ups) ===
Legend Grand Slam (0–0) ATP Finals (0–1) ATP 1000 (0–1) ATP 500 (1–4) ATP 250 (5–3)	Finals by surface Hard (4–6) Clay (2–1) Grass (0–2)	Finals by setting Indoor (2–4) Outdoor (4–5)

Result	W–L	Date	Tournament	Tier	Surface	Opponent	Score
Win	1–0	Aug 2014	Austrian Open Kitzbühel, Austria	ATP 250	Clay	(Austria) Dominic Thiem	4–6, 6–1, 6–3
Win	2–0	Sep 2014	Moselle Open, France	ATP 250	Hard (i)	(Portugal) João Sousa	6–4, 6–3
Loss	2–1	Oct 2014	Swiss Indoors, Switzerland	ATP 500	Hard (i)	(Switzerland) Roger Federer	2–6, 2–6
Loss	2–2	Jun 2015	Rosmalen Championships, Netherlands	ATP 250	Grass	(France) Nicolas Mahut	6–7^{(1–7)}, 1–6
Loss	2–3	Aug 2015	Swiss Open, Switzerland	ATP 250	Clay	(Austria) Dominic Thiem	5–7, 2–6
Loss	2–4	Oct 2016	Japan Open, Japan	ATP 500	Hard	(Australia) Nick Kyrgios	6–4, 3–6, 5–7
Loss	2–5	Feb 2017	Sofia Open, Bulgaria	ATP 250	Hard (i)	(Bulgaria) Grigor Dimitrov	5–7, 4–6
Loss	2–6	Feb 2017	Rotterdam Open, Netherlands	ATP 500	Hard (i)	(France) Jo-Wilfried Tsonga	6–4, 4–6, 1–6
Win	3–6	Oct 2017	Shenzhen Open, China	ATP 250	Hard	(Ukraine) Alexandr Dolgopolov	6–4, 6–7^{(5–7)}, 6–3
Win	4–6	Oct 2017	Japan Open, Japan	ATP 500	Hard	(France) Adrian Mannarino	6–3, 7–5
Loss	4–7	Nov 2017	ATP Finals, United Kingdom	Finals	Hard (i)	(Bulgaria) Grigor Dimitrov	5–7, 6–4, 3–6
Loss	4–8	Jun 2019	Halle Open, Germany	ATP 500	Grass	(Switzerland) Roger Federer	6–7^{(2–7)}, 1–6
Loss	4–9	Aug 2019	Cincinnati Open, United States	ATP 1000	Hard	(Russia) Daniil Medvedev	6–7^{(3–7)}, 4–6
Win	5–9	Feb 2021	Open Sud de France, France	ATP 250	Hard (i)	(Spain) Roberto Bautista Agut	5–7, 6–4, 6–2
Win	6–9	Apr 2022	Grand Prix Hassan II, Morocco	ATP 250	Clay	(Slovakia) Alex Molčan	3–6, 6–3, 6–3

=== Doubles: 1 (1 title) ===
Legend Grand Slam (0–0) ATP Finals (0–0) ATP 1000 (0–0) ATP 500 (0–0) ATP 250 (1–0)	Finals by surface Hard (1–0) Clay (0–0) Grass (0–0)	Finals by setting Indoor (0–0) Outdoor (1–0)

Result	W–L	Date	Tournament	Tier	Surface	Partner	Opponents	Score
Win	1–0	Jan 2019	Qatar Open, Qatar	ATP 250	Hard	(France) Pierre-Hugues Herbert	(Netherlands) Robin Haase (Netherlands) Matwé Middelkoop	5–7, 6–4, [10–4]

== ATP Challenger Tour finals ==
=== Singles: 11 (9 titles, 2 runner-ups) ===
Legend ATP Challenger Tour (9–2)	Finals by surface Hard (5–1) Clay (3–1) Grass (1–0)

Result	W–L	Date	Tournament	Tier	Surface	Opponent	Score
Loss	0–1	Sep 2010	Ljubljana Open, Slovenia	Challenger	Clay	(Slovenia) Blaž Kavčič	2–6, 6–4, 5–7
Win	1–1	Apr 2012	Orange Open Guadeloupe, Guadeloupe (FR)	Challenger	Hard	(Germany) Mischa Zverev	6–2, 6–2
Win	2–1	Sep 2012	Orléans Open, France	Challenger	Hard	(Belgium) Ruben Bemelmans	6–4, 3–6, 6–3
Win	3–1	Jul 2013	Eskişehir Cup, Turkey	Challenger	Hard	(Turkey) Marsel İlhan	4–6, 7–5, 6–2
Win	4–1	Jul 2014	Sport 1 Open, Netherlands	Challenger	Clay	(Germany) Andreas Beck	6–3, 6–2
Win	5–1	Jul 2014	Poznań Open, Poland	Challenger	Clay	(Slovenia) Blaž Rola	6–4, 6–2
Win	6–1	Jul 2014	Tampere Open, Finland	Challenger	Clay	(Finland) Jarkko Nieminen	7–6^{(7–3)}, 6–3
Win	7–1	Oct 2014	Ethias Trophy, Belgium	Challenger	Hard	(Belgium) Steve Darcis	6–3, 6–3
Win	8–1	Jan 2023	BW Open, Belgium	Challenger	Hard (i)	(Sweden) Mikael Ymer	6–4, 6–1
Loss	8–2	Nov 2023	Faip–Perrel Trophy, Italy	Challenger	Hard (i)	(United Kingdom) Jack Draper	6–1, 6–7^{(3–7)}, 3–6
Win	9–2	Jun 2024	Ilkley Trophy, United Kingdom	Challenger	Grass	(France) Harold Mayot	6–4, 6–2

== ITF Futures finals ==
=== Singles: 11 (6 titles, 5 runner-ups) ===
Legend ITF Futures (6–5)	Finals by surface Hard (4–2) Clay (2–3)

Result	W–L	Date	Tournament	Tier	Surface	Opponent	Score
Win	1–0	Sep 2008	F4 Cephalonia, Greece	Futures	Hard	(Belgium) Germain Gigounon	6–1, 6–2
Loss	1–1	Nov 2008	F1 Santo Domingo, Dominican Republic	Futures	Hard	(Austria) Nikolaus Moser	4–6, 3–6
Loss	1–2	Jun 2009	F16 Castelfranco Veneto, Italy	Futures	Clay	(Hungary) Ádám Kellner	4–6, 7–6^{(11–9)}, 3–6
Win	2–2	Jul 2010	F8 Römerberg, Germany	Futures	Clay	(France) Éric Prodon	walkover
Loss	2–3	Jul 2010	F9 Trier, Germany	Futures	Clay	(Bulgaria) Grigor Dimitrov	6–4, 1–6, 4–6
Loss	2–4	Aug 2010	F11 Wetzlar, Germany	Futures	Clay	(Germany) Alexander Flock	5–7, 2–6
Win	3–4	Aug 2010	F1 Eupen, Belgium	Futures	Clay	(Germany) Peter Torebko	6–3, 4–6, 6–3
Win	4–4	Oct 2010	F18 Saint-Dizier, France	Futures	Hard (i)	(Switzerland) Adrien Bossel	6–4, 7–5
Loss	4–5	Nov 2010	F4 Ramat HaSharon, Israel	Futures	Hard	(United Kingdom) Daniel Cox	6–3, 4–6, 4–6
Win	5–5	Oct 2011	F19 La Roche-sur-Yon, France	Futures	Hard	(Germany) Peter Torebko	6–2, 1–6, 7–6^{(7–4)}
Win	6–5	Oct 2011	F20 Rodez, France	Futures	Hard	(Spain) Adrián Menéndez Maceiras	6–3, 6–2

=== Doubles: 4 (2 titles, 2 runner-ups) ===
Legend ITF Futures (2–2)	Finals by surface Hard (1–0) Clay (1–2)

Result	W–L	Date	Tournament	Tier	Surface	Partner	Opponents	Score
Loss	0–1	Aug 2008	F1 Eupen, Belgium	Futures	Clay	(Belgium) Alexandre Folie	(Netherlands) Stephan Fransen (Netherlands) Romano Frantzen	6–3, 3–6, [3–10]
Loss	0–2	Aug 2008	F2 Koksijde, Belgium	Futures	Clay	(Belgium) Alexandre Folie	(Belgium) Ruben Bemelmans (Belgium) Niels Desein	5–7, 5–7
Win	1–2	Nov 2008	F2 Santo Domingo, Dominican Republic	Futures	Hard	(Czech Republic) Radim Žitko	(Georgia (country)) Lado Chikhladze (Germany) David Klier	7–6^{(10–8)}, 3–6, [10–3]
Win	2–2	Jul 2010	F9 Trier, Germany	Futures	Clay	(Belgium) Alexandre Folie	(United States) Patrick Frandji (Australia) Michael Hole	6–0, 6–7^{(4–7)}, [10–7]

== Best Grand Slam results details ==
	Australian Open	
2017 Australian Open (11th Seed)
Round	Opponent	Score
1R	(United States) Reilly Opelka (Q)	6–4, 4–6, 6–2, 4–6, 6–4
2R	(Czech Republic) Radek Štěpánek (Q)	6–4, 6–0, 6–3
3R	(Croatia) Ivo Karlović (20)	6–3, 6–2, 6–4
4R	(Austria) Dominic Thiem (8)	5–7, 7–6^{(7–4)}, 6–2, 6–2
QF	(Bulgaria) Grigor Dimitrov (15)	3–6, 2–6, 4–6

	French Open	
2016 French Open (12th Seed)
Round	Opponent	Score
1R	(France) Grégoire Barrère (WC)	6–3, 6–3, 6–4
2R	(Argentina) Carlos Berlocq (Q)	7–5, 6–1, 6–4
3R	(Spain) Nicolás Almagro	6–2, 4–6, 6–3, 4–6, 6–2
4R	(Latvia) Ernests Gulbis	4–6, 6–2, 6–2, 6–3
QF	(Austria) Dominic Thiem (13)	6–4, 6–7^{(7–9)}, 4–6, 1–6

	Wimbledon Championships	
2019 Wimbledon (21st Seed)
Round	Opponent	Score
1R	(United States) Bradley Klahn	6–4, 6–4, 6–4
2R	(France) Jérémy Chardy	6–2, 6–4, 6–3
3R	(Russia) Daniil Medvedev (11)	4–6, 6–2, 3–6, 6–3, 7–5
4R	(Spain) Fernando Verdasco	7–6^{(11–9)}, 2–6, 6–3, 6–4
QF	(Serbia) Novak Djokovic (1)	4–6, 0–6, 2–6
2022 Wimbledon
Round	Opponent	Score
1R	(Moldova) Radu Albot (Q)	6–2, 6–2, 7–6^{(7–5)}
2R	(Argentina) Sebastián Báez (31)	6–1, 6–2, 6–4
3R	(France) Ugo Humbert	4–6, 7–5, 6–2, 7–5
4R	(United States) Frances Tiafoe (23)	7–6^{(7–3)}, 5–7, 5–7, 6–4, 7–5
QF	(United Kingdom) Cameron Norrie (9)	6–3, 5–7, 6–2, 3–6, 5–7

	US Open	
2017 US Open (9th Seed)
Round	Opponent	Score
1R	(France) Julien Benneteau	6–4, 2–6, 6–4, 6–2
2R	(Argentina) Guido Pella	3–6, 7–6^{(7–5)}, 6–7^{(2–7)}, 7–6^{(7–4)}, 6–3
3R	(France) Gaël Monfils (18)	7–5, 5–1 ret.
4R	(Russia) Andrey Rublev	5–7, 6–7^{(5–7)}, 3–6
2018 US Open (10th Seed)
Round	Opponent	Score
1R	(Italy) Federico Gaio (Q)	6–2, 6–4, 7–6^{(7–5)}
2R	(Netherlands) Robin Haase	6–2, 6–7^{(1–7)}, 6–3, 6–2
3R	(Germany) Jan-Lennard Struff	6–4, 6–1, 7–6^{(7–4)}
4R	(Croatia) Marin Čilić (7)	6–7^{(6–8)}, 2–6, 4–6
2019 US Open (15th Seed)
Round	Opponent	Score
1R	(France) Corentin Moutet	6–3, 3–6, 6–4, 6–0
2R	(France) Grégoire Barrère (Q)	6–2, 6–2, 6–2
3R	(Spain) Pablo Carreño Busta	7–6^{(7–5)}, 7–6^{(11–9)}, 7–5
4R	(Switzerland) Roger Federer (3)	2–6, 2–6, 0–6
2020 US Open (7th Seed)
Round	Opponent	Score
1R	(United States) Reilly Opelka	7–6^{(7–2)}, 3–6, 6–1, 6–4
2R	(South Africa) Lloyd Harris	7–6^{(8–6)}, 4–6, 6–1, 6–4
3R	(Serbia) Filip Krajinović (26)	6–1, 7–6^{(7–5)}, 6–4
4R	(Canada) Denis Shapovalov (12)	7–6^{(7–0)} 3–6, 4–6, 3–6

== Wins over top 10 players ==
- Goffin has a 21–62 record against players who were, at the time the match was played, ranked in the top 10.

Season	2014	2015	2016	2017	2018	2019	2020	2021	2022	2023	2024	2025	2026	Total
Wins	1	0	3	7	3	1	1	1	1	0	1	2	0	21

#	Player	Rk	Event	Surface	Rd	Score	Rk	Ref
2014
1.	(Canada) Milos Raonic	9	Swiss Indoors, Switzerland	Hard (i)	QF	6–7^{(3–7)}, 6–3, 6–4	28	
2016
2.	(Switzerland) Stan Wawrinka	4	Indian Wells Open, United States	Hard	4R	6–3, 5–7, 7–6^{(7–5)}	18	
3.	(Czech Republic) Tomáš Berdych	8	Italian Open, Italy	Clay	3R	6–0, 6–0	13	
4.	(France) Gaël Monfils	8	Shanghai Masters, China	Hard	3R	4–6, 6–4, 6–2	12	
2017
5.	(Austria) Dominic Thiem	8	Australian Open, Australia	Hard	4R	5–7, 7–6^{(7–4)}, 6–2, 6–2	11	
6.	(Austria) Dominic Thiem	9	Monte-Carlo Masters, Monaco	Clay	3R	7–6^{(7–4)}, 4–6, 6–3	13	
7.	(Serbia) Novak Djokovic	2	Monte-Carlo Masters, Monaco	Clay	QF	6–2, 3–6, 7–5	13	
8.	(Canada) Milos Raonic	6	Madrid Open, Spain	Clay	3R	6–4, 6–2	10	
9.	(Spain) Rafael Nadal	1	ATP Finals, United Kingdom	Hard (i)	RR	7–6^{(7–5)}, 6–7^{(4–7)}, 6–4	8	
10.	(Austria) Dominic Thiem	4	ATP Finals, United Kingdom	Hard (i)	RR	6–4, 6–1	8	
11.	(Switzerland) Roger Federer	2	ATP Finals, United Kingdom	Hard (i)	SF	2–6, 6–3, 6–4	8	
2018
12.	(Argentina) Juan Martín del Potro	6	Italian Open, Italy	Clay	3R	6–2, 4–5 ret.	10	
13.	(South Africa) Kevin Anderson	6	Cincinnati Open, United States	Hard	3R	6–2, 6–4	11	
14.	(Argentina) Juan Martín del Potro	3	Cincinnati Open, United States	Hard	QF	7–6^{(7–5)}, 7–6^{(7–4)}	11	
2019
15.	(Germany) Alexander Zverev	5	Halle Open, Germany	Grass	QF	3–6, 6–1, 7–6^{(7–3)}	33	
2020
16.	(Spain) Rafael Nadal	1	ATP Cup, Australia	Hard	QF	6–4, 7–6^{(7–3)}	11	
2021
17.	(Germany) Alexander Zverev	6	Monte-Carlo Masters, Monaco	Clay	3R	6–4, 7–6^{(9–7)}	15	
2022
18.	(Spain) Carlos Alcaraz	1	Astana Open, Kazakhstan	Hard (i)	1R	7–5, 6–3	66	
2024
19.	(Germany) Alexander Zverev	3	Shanghai Masters, China	Hard	4R	6–4, 7–5	66	
2025
20.	(Spain) Carlos Alcaraz	3	Miami Open, United States	Hard	2R	5–7, 6–4, 6–3	55	
21.	(United States) Ben Shelton	6	Shanghai Masters, China	Hard	2R	6–2, 6–4	87	

== Team competitions finals ==
=== Davis Cup: 2 (2 runner-ups) ===
Outcome	Date	Tournament	Surface	Partner(s)	Opponents	Score
Loss	Nov 2015	Davis Cup, Ghent, Belgium	Clay (i)	(Belgium) Ruben Bemelmans (Belgium) Kimmer Coppejans (Belgium) Steve Darcis	(United Kingdom) Kyle Edmund (United Kingdom) Andy Murray (United Kingdom) Jamie Murray (United Kingdom) James Ward	1–3
Loss	Nov 2017	Davis Cup, Villeneuve-d'Ascq, France	Hard (i)	(Belgium) Ruben Bemelmans (Belgium) Steve Darcis (Belgium) Joris De Loore	(France) Richard Gasquet (France) Pierre-Hugues Herbert (France) Lucas Pouille (France) Jo-Wilfried Tsonga	2–3
