= 2015 Moselle Open – Singles =

Singles
- 2015 Moselle Open

Final
- Champion: (France) Jo-Wilfried Tsonga
- Runner-up: (France) Gilles Simon
- Score: 7–6^{(7–5)}, 1–6, 6–2

Details
- Draw: 32
- Seeds: 8

Events
Singles	Doubles
← 2014 ·	Moselle Open	· 2016 →

David Goffin was the defending champion but chose not to participate this year.

Jo-Wilfried Tsonga won the title, defeating Gilles Simon in the final, 7–6^{(7–5)}, 1–6, 6–2.

== Seeds ==
The top four seeds receive a bye into the second round.

1. (Switzerland) Stan Wawrinka (quarterfinals, withdrew)
2. (France) Gilles Simon (final)
3. (France) Jo-Wilfried Tsonga (champion)
4. (Spain) Guillermo García López (quarterfinals)
5. (Germany) Philipp Kohlschreiber (semifinals)
6. (Slovakia) Martin Kližan (semifinals)
7. (France) Adrian Mannarino (second round)
8. (Spain) Fernando Verdasco (second round)

== Draw ==
=== Key ===
- Q = Qualifier
- WC = Wild card
- LL = Lucky loser
- Alt = Alternate
- SE = Special exempt
- PR = Protected ranking
- ITF = ITF entry
- JE = Junior exempt
- w/o = Walkover
- r = Retired
- d = Defaulted
- SR = Special ranking

=== Finals ===
Semifinals
5/WC	(Germany) Philipp Kohlschreiber	3	4
3	(France) Jo-Wilfried Tsonga	6	6
6	(Slovakia) Martin Kližan	4	4
2	(France) Gilles Simon	6	6

Final
3	(France) Jo-Wilfried Tsonga	7^{7}	1	6
2	(France) Gilles Simon	6^{5}	6	2

=== Top half ===
First round
(Germany) D Brown	6	3	6
(United States) R Ram	3	6	3
(Belgium) S Darcis	6	3	3
(Italy) P Lorenzi	1	6	6
(Australia) J Millman	6^{5}	3
5/WC	(Germany) P Kohlschreiber	7^{7}	6
(Spain) P Carreño Busta	2	7^{7}	1
Q	(Germany) M Zverev	6	6^{3}	6
(Argentina) F Delbonis	2	5
(France) N Mahut	6	7
Q	(France) V Millot	2	5
7	(France) A Mannarino	6	7

Second round
1	(Switzerland) S Wawrinka	4	6	7^{7}
(Germany) D Brown	6	3	6^{4}
(Italy) P Lorenzi	3	3
5/WC	(Germany) P Kohlschreiber	6	6
3	(France) J-W Tsonga	7^{7}	6^{8}	6
Q	(Germany) M Zverev	6^{5}	7^{10}	3
(France) N Mahut	6	6^{5}	6
7	(France) A Mannarino	4	7^{7}	3

Quarterfinals
1	(Switzerland) S Wawrinka
5/WC	(Germany) P Kohlschreiber	w/o
3	(France) J-W Tsonga	6^{6}	6	7
(France) N Mahut	7^{8}	3	5

Semifinals
5/WC	(Germany) P Kohlschreiber	3	4
3	(France) J-W Tsonga	6	6

=== Bottom half ===
First round
6	(Slovakia) M Kližan	6^{1}	6	3
(France) P-H Mathieu	7^{7}	3	2^{r}
(Kazakhstan) A Nedovyesov	1	5
(Canada) V Pospisil	6	7
WC	(France) P-H Herbert	6	7
(Ukraine) S Stakhovsky	2	5
8/WC	(Spain) F Verdasco	6^{2}	6	6
(Germany) A Zverev	7^{7}	3	3
(Luxembourg) G Müller	6	6
(United Kingdom) A Bedene	3	4
Q	(France) K de Schepper	4	6^{2}
Q	(France) E Roger-Vasselin	6	7^{7}

Second round
6	(Slovakia) M Kližan	6	7^{9}
(Canada) V Pospisil	4	6^{7}
WC	(France) P-H Herbert	6	2	4
4	(Spain) G García López	4	6	6
8/WC	(Spain) F Verdasco	6^{3}	6^{2}
(Luxembourg) G Müller	7^{7}	7^{7}
Q	(France) E Roger-Vasselin	4	2
2	(France) G Simon	6	6

Quarterfinals
6	(Slovakia) M Kližan	4	6	7^{7}
4	(Spain) G García López	6	3	6^{4}
(Luxembourg) G Müller	4	4
2	(France) G Simon	6	6

Semifinals
6	(Slovakia) M Kližan	4	4
2	(France) G Simon	6	6

== Qualifying ==
=== Seeds ===
1. (France) Kenny de Schepper (qualified)
2. (France) Édouard Roger-Vasselin (qualified)
3. (Germany) Daniel Brands (qualifying competition)
4. (France) Vincent Millot (qualified)
5. (France) Constant Lestienne (qualifying competition)
6. (Germany) Mischa Zverev (qualified)
7. (France) Enzo Couacaud (qualifying competition)
8. (France) Maxime Teixeira (qualifying competition)

=== Qualifiers ===
1. (France) Kenny de Schepper
2. (France) Édouard Roger-Vasselin
3. (Germany) Mischa Zverev
4. (France) Vincent Millot

=== Qualifying draw ===
==== First qualifier ====
Second round
1	(France) Kenny de Schepper	7^{7}	7
(France) Hugo Nys	6^{2}	5
(France) Grégoire Jacq	3	4
5	(France) Constant Lestienne	6	6

Qualifying competition
1	(France) Kenny de Schepper	7	6
5	(France) Constant Lestienne	5	3

==== Second qualifier ====
First round					Second round				Qualifying competition
					2	(France) Édouard Roger-Vasselin	6	6
WC	(France) Julien Mathieu	6	3	4		(New Zealand) Michael Venus	3	3
	(New Zealand) Michael Venus	4	6	6					2	(France) Édouard Roger-Vasselin	6	6
	(Croatia) Filip Veger	6	6						7	(France) Enzo Couacaud	1	1
	(Croatia) Mate Pavić	3	4			(Croatia) Filip Veger	2	4
					7	(France) Enzo Couacaud	6	6

==== Third qualifier ====
First round					Second round				Qualifying competition
					3	(Germany) Daniel Brands	6	6
	(France) Sadio Doumbia	4	6	7^{7}		(France) Sadio Doumbia	3	4
WC	(Brazil) André Sá	6	2	6^{3}					3	(Germany) Daniel Brands	4	6	3
	(Russia) Ilya Vasilyev	0	3						6	(Germany) Mischa Zverev	6	3	6
	(France) Téri Groll	6	6			(France) Téri Groll	1	4
					6	(Germany) Mischa Zverev	6	6

==== Fourth qualifier ====
First round				Second round					Qualifying competition
				4	(France) Vincent Millot	6	6
	(Germany) Tom Schönenberg	6	6		(Germany) Tom Schönenberg	4	4
	(Croatia) Stefan Merunka	0	0						4	(France) Vincent Millot	7	6
	(France) Laurent Rochette	7	6						8	(France) Maxime Teixeira	5	4
WC	(France) Hugo Schott	5	4		(France) Laurent Rochette	7^{7}	1	4
				8	(France) Maxime Teixeira	6^{2}	6	6
