= 2014 Moselle Open =

- Date: 15–21 September
- Edition: 12th
- Category: World Tour 250
- Surface: Hard / indoor
- Location: Metz, France
- Venue: Arènes de Metz

Champions

Singles
- (Belgium) David Goffin

Doubles
- (Poland) Mariusz Fyrstenberg / (Poland) Marcin Matkowski
- Moselle Open

The 2014 Moselle Open was a men's tennis tournament held in Metz, France and played on indoor hard courts. It was the 12th edition of the Moselle Open, and part of the ATP World Tour 250 series of the 2014 ATP World Tour. It was held at the Arènes de Metz from 15 September until 21 September 2014. Eighth-seeded David Goffin won the singles title.

== Singles main-draw entrants ==
=== Seeds ===
Country	Player	Rank^{1}	Seed
FRA	Jo-Wilfried Tsonga	12	1
FRA	Gaël Monfils	18	2
GER	Philipp Kohlschreiber	24	3
CZE	Lukáš Rosol	27	4
FRA	Jérémy Chardy	35	5
POR	João Sousa	40	6
POL	Jerzy Janowicz	41	7
BEL	David Goffin	46	8

- ^{1} Rankings are as of September 8, 2014.

=== Other entrants ===
The following players received wild cards into the singles main draw:

- (France) Laurent Lokoli
- (France) Nicolas Mahut
- (France) Paul-Henri Mathieu

The following players received entry from the singles qualifying draw:

- (France) Kenny de Schepper
- (France) Pierre-Hugues Herbert
- (Poland) Michał Przysiężny
- (France) Florent Serra

=== Withdrawals ===
Before the tournament

- (Kazakhstan) Andrey Golubev
- (Spain) Marcel Granollers
- (Kazakhstan) Mikhail Kukushkin
- (Argentina) Leonardo Mayer
- (France) Gilles Simon (right wrist injury)
- (Russia) Dmitry Tursunov
- (Switzerland) Stan Wawrinka (fatigue)

=== Retirements ===
- (Germany) Philipp Kohlschreiber
- (Italy) Andreas Seppi (back injury)

== Doubles main-draw entrants ==
=== Seeds ===
Country	Player	Country	Player	Rank^{1}	Seed
~~FRA~~	~~Nicolas Mahut~~	~~FRA~~	~~Édouard Roger-Vasselin~~	~~27~~	~~1~~
GBR	Dominic Inglot	ROU	Florin Mergea	67	2
POL	Mariusz Fyrstenberg	POL	Marcin Matkowski	85	3
CRO	Marin Draganja	FIN	Henri Kontinen	87	4

- Rankings are as of September 8, 2014

=== Other entrants ===
The following pairs received wildcards into the doubles main draw:

- (France) Jonathan Eysseric / (France) Adrian Mannarino
- (France) Marc Gicquel / (France) Pierre-Hugues Herbert

The following pairs received entry as alternates:

- (Ukraine) Sergiy Bubka / (Ukraine) Sergiy Stakhovsky
- (Germany) Frank Moser / (Germany) Alexander Satschko

=== Withdrawals ===
Before the tournament

- (France) Édouard Roger-Vasselin (right hip injury)
- (Italy) Andreas Seppi (back injury)

== Finals ==
=== Singles ===
- (Belgium) David Goffin defeated (Portugal) João Sousa 6–4, 6–3

=== Doubles ===
- (Poland) Mariusz Fyrstenberg / (Poland) Marcin Matkowski defeated (Croatia) Marin Draganja / (Finland) Henri Kontinen, 6–7^{(3–7)}, 6–3, [10–8]
