= 2015 Eskişehir Cup =

- Date: 18–24 May
- Edition: 2nd
- Surface: Hard
- Location: Eskişehir, Turkey

Champions

Singles
- (Italy) Paolo Lorenzi

Doubles
- (Belarus) Sergey Betov / (Russia) Mikhail Elgin
← 2013 ·	Eskişehir Cup

The 2015 Eskişehir Cup was a professional tennis tournament played on hard courts. It was the 2nd edition of the tournament which was part of the 2015 ATP Challenger Tour. It took place in Eskişehir, Turkey between 18 and 24 May 2015.

== Singles main-draw entrants ==
=== Seeds ===
Country	Player	Rank^{1}	Seed
ITA	Paolo Lorenzi	94	1
ESP	Íñigo Cervantes	184	2
TPE	Chen Ti	211	3
IND	Saketh Myneni	229	4
AUS	Matthew Ebden	236	5
AUT	Dennis Novak	243	6
BRA	Henrique Cunha	246	7
FRA	Rémi Boutillier	253	8

- ^{1} Rankings are as of May 11, 2015.

=== Other entrants ===
The following players received wildcards into the singles main draw:

- (Turkey) Barış Ergüden
- (Turkey) Cem İlkel
- (Turkey) Anıl Yüksel
- (Slovenia) Grega Žemlja

The following players received entry from the qualifying draw:

- (Venezuela) Ricardo Rodríguez
- (Belarus) Yaraslav Shyla
- (Croatia) Filip Veger
- (South Africa) Tucker Vorster

== Champions ==
=== Singles ===
- (Italy) Paolo Lorenzi def. (Spain) Íñigo Cervantes, 7–6^{(7–4)}, 7–6^{(7–5)}

=== Doubles ===
- (Belarus) Sergey Betov / (Russia) Mikhail Elgin def. (Chinese Taipei) Chen Ti / (South Africa) Ruan Roelofse, 6–4, 6–7^{(2–7)}, [10–7]
