= 2015 Eskişehir Cup – Doubles =

Doubles
- 2015 Eskişehir Cup

Final
- Champions: (Belarus) Sergey Betov (Russia) Mikhail Elgin
- Runners-up: (Chinese Taipei) Chen Ti (South Africa) Ruan Roelofse
- Score: 6–4, 6–7^{(2–7)}, [10–7]

Events
Singles	Doubles
← 2013 ·	Eskişehir Cup

Marin Draganja and Mate Pavić were the defending champions, but they decided not to participate this year.

Sergey Betov and Mikhail Elgin won the title, defeating Chen Ti and Ruan Roelofse in the final, 6–4, 6–7^{(2–7)}, [10–7].

== Seeds ==
1. (Belarus) Sergey Betov / (Russia) Mikhail Elgin (champions)
2. (India) Saketh Myneni / (India) Divij Sharan (quarterfinals)
3. (United Kingdom) Sean Thornley / (United Kingdom) Darren Walsh (first round)
4. (United States) James Cerretani / (Japan) Yasutaka Uchiyama (semifinals, withdrew)

== Draw ==
=== Key ===
- Q = Qualifier
- WC = Wild card
- LL = Lucky loser
- Alt = Alternate
- SE = Special exempt
- PR = Protected ranking
- ITF = ITF entry
- JE = Junior exempt
- w/o = Walkover
- r = Retired
- d = Defaulted
- SR = Special ranking

First round
1	(Belarus) S Betov (Russia) M Elgin	7^{7}	4	[10]
(Belarus) Y Shyla (Belarus) A Vasilevski	6^{5}	6	[5]
(Serbia) N Milojević (Portugal) FF Silva	6^{4}	6	[10]
(Spain) I Cervantes (Spain) O Roca Batalla	7^{7}	3	[7]
4	(United States) J Cerretani (Japan) Y Uchiyama	6	6
(Republic of Ireland) J Cluskey (Republic of Ireland) D O'Hare	3	3
(France) R Boutillier (France) Y Jankovits	6	1	[5]
WC	(Turkey) B Ergüden (Turkey) A Yüksel	4	6	[10]
(Chinese Taipei) T Chen (South Africa) R Roelofse	6	6
(Italy) R Bellotti (Austria) D Novak	4	4
(Brazil) Henrique Cunha (United States) Connor Smith	7^{17}	4	[10]
3	(United Kingdom) S Thornley (United Kingdom) D Walsh	6^{15}	6	[6]
(Switzerland) A Bossel (Switzerland) M Chiudinelli	6	6
WC	(Turkey) C İlkel (Turkey) Efe Yurtacan	4	0
WC	(Turkey) A Çelikbilek (Turkey) Sefa Suluoğlu	3	3
2	(India) S Myneni (India) D Sharan	6	6

Quarterfinals
1	(Belarus) S Betov (Russia) M Elgin	w/o
(Serbia) N Milojević (Portugal) FF Silva
4	(United States) J Cerretani (Japan) Y Uchiyama	6	6^{6}	[10]
WC	(Turkey) B Ergüden (Turkey) A Yüksel	4	7^{8}	[6]
(Chinese Taipei) T Chen (South Africa) R Roelofse	6	3	[10]
(Brazil) H Cunha (United States) C Smith	3	6	[7]
(Switzerland) A Bossel (Switzerland) M Chiudinelli	6	4	[10]
2	(India) S Myneni (India) D Sharan	4	6	[8]

Semifinals
1	(Belarus) S Betov (Russia) M Elgin	w/o
4	(United States) J Cerretani (Japan) Y Uchiyama
(Chinese Taipei) T Chen (South Africa) R Roelofse	6	6
(Switzerland) A Bossel (Switzerland) M Chiudinelli	4	4

Final
1	(Belarus) S Betov (Russia) M Elgin	6	6^{2}	[10]
(Chinese Taipei) T Chen (South Africa) R Roelofse	4	7^{7}	[7]
