= 2019 Moselle Open – Singles =

Singles
- 2019 Moselle Open

Final
- Champion: (France) Jo-Wilfried Tsonga
- Runner-up: (Slovenia) Aljaž Bedene
- Score: 6–7^{(4–7)}, 7–6^{(7–4)}, 6–3

Details
- Draw: 28 (4 Q / 3 WC )
- Seeds: 8

Events
Singles	Doubles
← 2018 ·	Moselle Open	· 2021 →

Gilles Simon was the defending champion, but lost in the second round to Aljaž Bedene.

Jo-Wilfried Tsonga won a record fourth title in Metz, defeating Bedene in the final, 6–7^{(4–7)}, 7–6^{(7–4)}, 6–3.

== Seeds ==
The top four seeds received a bye into the second round.

1. (Belgium) David Goffin (second round)
2. (Georgia (country)) Nikoloz Basilashvili (quarterfinals, retired)
3. (France) Benoît Paire (semifinals)
4. (France) Lucas Pouille (semifinals)
5. (Spain) Fernando Verdasco (second round)
6. (Poland) Hubert Hurkacz (first round)
7. (France) Gilles Simon (second round)
8. (Germany) Jan-Lennard Struff (first round)

== Draw ==
=== Key ===
- Q = Qualifier
- WC = Wild card
- LL = Lucky loser
- Alt = Alternate
- SE = Special exempt
- PR = Protected ranking
- ITF = ITF entry
- JE = Junior exempt
- w/o = Walkover
- r = Retired
- d = Defaulted
- SR = Special ranking

=== Finals ===
Semifinals
(Slovenia) Aljaž Bedene	4	6	6
3	(France) Benoît Paire	6	1	2
4	(France) Lucas Pouille	6^{6}	6^{4}
(France) Jo-Wilfried Tsonga	7^{8}	7^{7}

Final
(Slovenia) Aljaž Bedene	7^{7}	6^{4}	3
(France) Jo-Wilfried Tsonga	6^{4}	7^{7}	6

=== Top half ===
First round
Q	(Germany) J Lenz	1	1
(Spain) P Carreño Busta	6	6
(Slovenia) A Bedene	6	6
WC	(France) R Roumane	4	4
(Romania) M Copil	3	4
7	(France) G Simon	6	6
Q	(Spain) M Granollers	6	6^{5}	4
(France) R Gasquet	4	7^{7}	6
WC	(France) A Hoang	6	6
PR	(Germany) C-M Stebe	2	3
WC	(France) G Barrère	6	6
6	(Poland) H Hurkacz	2	2

Second round
1	(Belgium) D Goffin	3	2
(Spain) P Carreño Busta	6	6
(Slovenia) A Bedene	7^{11}	6
7	(France) G Simon	6^{9}	2
3	(France) B Paire	3	6	6
(France) R Gasquet	6	3	4
WC	(France) A Hoang	6	6^{6}	2
WC	(France) G Barrère	3	7^{8}	6

Quarterfinals
(Spain) P Carreño Busta	4	5
(Slovenia) A Bedene	6	7
3	(France) B Paire	7^{7}	6
WC	(France) G Barrère	6^{4}	4

Semifinals
(Slovenia) A Bedene	4	6	6
3	(France) B Paire	6	1	2

=== Bottom half ===
First round
5	(Spain) F Verdasco	6	6
PR	(Belgium) S Darcis	2	2
(Germany) P Gojowczyk	5	4
(Serbia) F Krajinović	7	6
(Italy) L Sonego	6	7^{7}
Q	(Germany) O Otte	2	6^{2}
8	(Germany) J-L Struff	6^{3}	4
(France) P-H Herbert	7^{7}	6
(Spain) P Andújar	6	1	2
(France) J-W Tsonga	3	6	6
(France) U Humbert	4	7^{10}	4
Q	(Germany) Y Maden	6	6^{8}	6

Second round
5	(Spain) F Verdasco	6	4	3
(Serbia) F Krajinović	3	6	6
(Italy) L Sonego	1	4
4	(France) L Pouille	6	6
(France) P-H Herbert	3	4
(France) J-W Tsonga	6	6
Q	(Germany) Y Maden	2	6^{6}
2	(Georgia (country)) N Basilashvili	6	7^{8}

Quarterfinals
(Serbia) F Krajinović	6	5	2
4	(France) L Pouille	4	7	6
(France) J-W Tsonga	5	6	4
2	(Georgia (country)) N Basilashvili	7	3	1^{r}

Semifinals
4	(France) L Pouille	6^{6}	6^{4}
(France) J-W Tsonga	7^{8}	7^{7}

== Qualifying ==
=== Seeds ===
1. (Spain) Marcel Granollers (qualified)
2. (Germany) Matthias Bachinger (qualifying competition)
3. (Germany) Yannick Maden (qualified)
4. (Germany) Oscar Otte (qualified)
5. (France) Nicolas Mahut (qualifying competition)
6. (France) Maxime Janvier (qualifying competition)
7. (France) Constant Lestienne (first round)
8. (Spain) Adrián Menéndez Maceiras (qualifying competition)

=== Qualifiers ===
1. (Spain) Marcel Granollers
2. (Germany) Julian Lenz
3. (Germany) Yannick Maden
4. (Germany) Oscar Otte

=== Qualifying draw ===
==== First qualifier ====
First round
1	(Spain) Marcel Granollers	6	6
WC	(France) Albano Olivetti	4	2
WC	(France) Harold Mayot	6	3	6^{2}
8	(Spain) Adrián Menéndez Maceiras	3	6	7^{7}

Qualifying competition
1	(Spain) Marcel Granollers	6	6
8	(Spain) Adrián Menéndez Maceiras	3	2

==== Second qualifier ====
First round
2	(Germany) Matthias Bachinger	4	6	6
(Austria) Lucas Miedler	6	4	3
(Germany) Julian Lenz	4	6	7
7	(France) Constant Lestienne	6	3	5

Qualifying competition
2	(Germany) Matthias Bachinger	4	4
(Germany) Julian Lenz	6	6

==== Third qualifier ====
First round
3	(Germany) Yannick Maden	6	6
Alt	(France) Manuel Guinard	0	4
(France) Tristan Lamasine	4	5
5	(France) Nicolas Mahut	6	7

Qualifying competition
3	(Germany) Yannick Maden	6	7^{7}
5	(France) Nicolas Mahut	3	6^{4}

==== Fourth qualifier ====
First round
4	(Germany) Oscar Otte	7^{7}	6
Alt	(Russia) Artem Dubrivnyy	6^{3}	3
(Germany) Mischa Zverev	6^{3}	0^{r}
6	(France) Maxime Janvier	7^{7}	2

Qualifying competition
4	(Germany) Oscar Otte	2	6	6
6	(France) Maxime Janvier	6	3	2
