= 2013 Eskişehir Cup – Doubles =

Doubles
- 2013 Eskişehir Cup

Final
- Champions: (Croatia) Marin Draganja (Croatia) Mate Pavić
- Runners-up: (Thailand) Sanchai Ratiwatana (Thailand) Sonchat Ratiwatana
- Score: 6–3, 3–6, [10–7]

Events
| Singles | Doubles |
| Eskişehir Cup | · 2015 → |

Marin Draganja and Mate Pavić won the title, defeating Sanchai and Sonchat Ratiwatana in the final, 6–3, 3–6, [10–7].

== Seeds ==
1. (Thailand) Sanchai Ratiwatana / (Thailand) Sonchat Ratiwatana (final)
2. (Croatia) Marin Draganja / (Croatia) Mate Pavić (champion)
3. (United Kingdom) David Rice / (United Kingdom) Sean Thornley (semifinals)
4. (China) Chen Ti / (Belarus) Dzmitry Zhyrmont (semifinals)

== Draw ==
=== Key ===
- Q = Qualifier
- WC = Wild card
- LL = Lucky loser
- Alt = Alternate
- SE = Special exempt
- PR = Protected ranking
- ITF = ITF entry
- JE = Junior exempt
- w/o = Walkover
- r = Retired
- d = Defaulted
- SR = Special ranking

=== Draw ===
First round
1 | (Thailand) Sa Ratiwatana (Thailand) So Ratiwatana | 3 | 6 | [11]
(Spain) Jaime Pulgar-García (Croatia) F Veger | 6 | 4 | [9]
WC | (Turkey) C İlkel (Turkey) Efe Yurtaçan | 7^{9} | 4 | [10]
(India) S Balaji (Greece) A Jakupovic | 6^{7} | 6 | [6]
4 | (China) T Chen (Belarus) D Zhyrmont | 6 | 6
WC | (Turkey) Durukan Durmuş (Turkey) A Yüksel | 1 | 1
(Russia) T Gabashvili (Belarus) U Ignatik | 7^{11} | 6
(Republic of Ireland) J Cluskey (United Kingdom) E Corrie | 6^{9} | 4
(Georgia (country)) N Basilashvili (United Kingdom) B Klein | 6 | 5 | [5]
(Russia) E Karlovskiy (Croatia) L Zovko | 3 | 7 | [10]
Alt | (Spain) Luis Antonio Pérez Pérez (Slovakia) Adrian Sikora | 3 | 1
3 | (United Kingdom) D Rice (United Kingdom) S Thornley | 6 | 6
(Austria) M Neuchrist (Chile) H Podlipnik-Castillo | 6 | 6
WC | (Turkey) Haluk Akkoyun (Turkey) B Ergüden | 4 | 4
(Spain) E López-Pérez (Egypt) M Safwat
2 | (Croatia) M Draganja (Croatia) M Pavić | w/o

Quarterfinals
(Thailand) Sa Ratiwatana (Thailand) So Ratiwatana | 7^{7} | 7
WC | (Turkey) C İlkel (Turkey) E Yurtaçan | 6^{2} | 5
4 | (China) T Chen (Belarus) D Zhyrmont | 6 | 1 | [12]
(Russia) T Gabashvili (Belarus) U Ignatik | 4 | 6 | [10]
(Russia) E Karlovskiy (Croatia) L Zovko | 2 | 4
3 | (United Kingdom) D Rice (United Kingdom) S Thornley | 6 | 6
(Austria) M Neuchrist (Chile) H Podlipnik-Castillo | 1 | 3
2 | (Croatia) M Draganja (Croatia) M Pavić | 6 | 6

Semifinals
1 | (Thailand) Sa Ratiwatana (Thailand) So Ratiwatana | 6 | 7^{7}
4 | (China) T Chen (Belarus) D Zhyrmont | 2 | 6^{4}
3 | (United Kingdom) D Rice (United Kingdom) S Thornley | 4 | 3
2 | (Croatia) M Draganja (Croatia) M Pavić | 6 | 6

Final
1 | (Thailand) Sa Ratiwatana (Thailand) So Ratiwatana | 3 | 6 | [7]
2 | (Croatia) M Draganja (Croatia) M Pavić | 6 | 3 | [10]
