= 2019 Moselle Open – Doubles =

Doubles
- 2019 Moselle Open

Final
- Champions: (Sweden) Robert Lindstedt (Germany) Jan-Lennard Struff
- Runners-up: (France) Nicolas Mahut (France) Édouard Roger-Vasselin
- Score: 2–6, 7–6^{(7–1)}, [10–4]

Events
Singles	Doubles
← 2018 ·	Moselle Open	· 2021 →

Nicolas Mahut and Édouard Roger-Vasselin were the defending champions, but lost in the final to Robert Lindstedt and Jan-Lennard Struff, 6–2, 6–7^{(1–7)}, [4–10].

== Seeds ==
1. (France) Nicolas Mahut / (France) Édouard Roger-Vasselin (final)
2. (United Kingdom) Luke Bambridge / (Japan) Ben McLachlan (first round)
3. (United Kingdom) Jonny O'Mara / (United Kingdom) Ken Skupski (first round)
4. (Mexico) Santiago González / (Pakistan) Aisam-ul-Haq Qureshi (semifinals)

== Draw ==
=== Key ===
- Q = Qualifier
- WC = Wild card
- LL = Lucky loser
- Alt = Alternate
- SE = Special exempt
- PR = Protected ranking
- ITF = ITF entry
- JE = Junior exempt
- w/o = Walkover
- r = Retired
- d = Defaulted
- SR = Special ranking

=== Draw ===
First round
1	(France) N Mahut (France) É Roger-Vasselin	6	6
WC	(France) T Lamasine (France) J-W Tsonga	2	4
WC	(France) D Added (France) A Olivetti	7^{7}	7
(Monaco) R Arneodo (France) B Paire	6^{3}	5
3	(United Kingdom) J O'Mara (United Kingdom) K Skupski	4	6^{8}
(Romania) M Copil (France) U Humbert	6	7^{10}
(France) L Pouille (Australia) M Reid	4	6	[9]
(Netherlands) S Arends (Netherlands) D Pel	6	0	[11]
(India) P Raja (Mexico) MÁ Reyes-Varela	3	4
(Spain) G Granollers (Spain) M Granollers	6	6
(Ukraine) D Molchanov (New Zealand) A Sitak	6	5	[9]
4	(Mexico) S González (Pakistan) A-u-H Qureshi	4	7	[11]
(France) G Simon (Germany) M Zverev	7	3	[10]
(Israel) J Erlich (France) F Martin	5	6	[7]
(Sweden) R Lindstedt (Germany) J-L Struff	6	7^{17}
2	(United Kingdom) L Bambridge (Japan) B McLachlan	4	6^{15}

Quarterfinals
1	(France) N Mahut (France) É Roger-Vasselin	6	6
WC	(France) D Added (France) A Olivetti	4	1
(Romania) M Copil (France) U Humbert	7^{7}	3	[5]
(Netherlands) S Arends (Netherlands) D Pel	6^{5}	6	[10]
(Spain) G Granollers (Spain) M Granollers	6^{4}	3
4	(Mexico) S González (Pakistan) A-u-H Qureshi	7^{7}	6
(France) G Simon (Germany) M Zverev	7^{7}	6^{7}	[7]
(Sweden) R Lindstedt (Germany) J-L Struff	6^{5}	7^{9}	[10]

Semifinals
1	(France) N Mahut (France) É Roger-Vasselin	6	6
(Netherlands) S Arends (Netherlands) D Pel	3	1
4	(Mexico) S González (Pakistan) A-u-H Qureshi	4	6^{2}
(Sweden) R Lindstedt (Germany) J-L Struff	6	7^{7}

Final
1	(France) N Mahut (France) É Roger-Vasselin	6	6^{1}	[4]
(Sweden) R Lindstedt (Germany) J-L Struff	2	7^{7}	[10]
