= 2018 Moselle Open – Singles =

Singles
- 2018 Moselle Open

Final
- Champion: (France) Gilles Simon
- Runner-up: (Germany) Matthias Bachinger
- Score: 7–6^{(7–2)}, 6–1

Details
- Draw: 28 (4 Q / 3 WC )
- Seeds: 8

Events
Singles	Doubles
← 2017 ·	Moselle Open	· 2019 →

Peter Gojowczyk was the defending champion, but lost to Kei Nishikori in the second round.

Gilles Simon won the title, defeating Matthias Bachinger in the final, 7–6^{(7–2)}, 6–1.

== Seeds ==
The top four seeds receive a bye into the second round.

1. (Japan) Kei Nishikori (semifinals)
2. (Greece) Stefanos Tsitsipas (second round)
3. (France) Lucas Pouille (withdrew)
4. (France) Richard Gasquet (quarterfinals)
5. (Georgia (country)) Nikoloz Basilashvili (quarterfinals)
6. (France) Adrian Mannarino (first round)
7. (Serbia) Filip Krajinović (second round)
8. (Germany) Philipp Kohlschreiber (withdrew)

== Draw ==
=== Key ===
- Q = Qualifier
- WC = Wild card
- LL = Lucky loser
- Alt = Alternate
- SE = Special exempt
- PR = Protected ranking
- ITF = ITF entry
- JE = Junior exempt
- w/o = Walkover
- r = Retired
- d = Defaulted
- SR = Special ranking

=== Finals ===
Semifinals
1	(Japan) Kei Nishikori	6	4	5
Q	(Germany) Matthias Bachinger	2	6	7
(France) Gilles Simon	6	6
(Moldova) Radu Albot	3	1

Final
Q	(Germany) Matthias Bachinger	6^{2}	1
(France) Gilles Simon	7^{7}	6

=== Top half ===
First round
(Germany) P Gojowczyk	6^{5}	6	6
(France) J-W Tsonga	7^{7}	3	4
Q	(Australia) B Tomic	7^{7}	3	4
WC	(France) U Humbert	6^{5}	6	6
Q	(France) K de Schepper	2	6^{0}
5	(Georgia (country)) N Basilashvili	6	7^{7}
(Spain) J Munar	4	4
Q	(Germany) M Bachinger	6	6
WC	(France) Q Halys	6^{4}	2
(France) B Paire	7^{7}	6
(Germany) M Zverev	5	6	1
LL	(Germany) Y Maden	7	4	6

Second round
1	(Japan) K Nishikori	7^{7}	6
(Germany) P Gojowczyk	6^{4}	3
WC	(France) U Humbert	7^{7}	6^{4}	3
5	(Georgia (country)) N Basilashvili	6^{2}	7^{7}	6
LL	(France) G Barrère	0	3
Q	(Germany) M Bachinger	6	6
(France) B Paire	4	6	3
LL	(Germany) Y Maden	6	3	6

Quarterfinals
1	(Japan) K Nishikori	6	4	6
5	(Georgia (country)) N Basilashvili	3	6	4
Q	(Germany) M Bachinger	6	2	6
LL	(Germany) Y Maden	3	6	4

Semifinals
1	(Japan) K Nishikori	6	4	5
Q	(Germany) M Bachinger	2	6	7

=== Bottom half ===
First round
7	(Serbia) F Krajinović	6	6
WC	(France) C Moutet	1	1
(France) G Simon	7	6
(Czech Republic) J Veselý	5	3
Q	(France) C Lestienne	6	7
(Estonia) J Zopp	3	5
6	(France) A Mannarino	3	2
(Hungary) M Fucsovics	6	6
(Moldova) R Albot	6	6
(France) P-H Herbert	3	4
(Germany) M Marterer	6^{1}	7^{7}	4
(Lithuania) R Berankis	7^{7}	6^{1}	6

Second round
7	(Serbia) F Krajinović	6	5	5
(France) G Simon	4	7	7
Q	(France) C Lestienne	4	2
4	(France) R Gasquet	6	6
(Hungary) M Fucsovics	3	2
(Moldova) R Albot	6	6
(Lithuania) R Berankis	6^{5}	7^{8}	6
2	(Greece) S Tsitsipas	7^{7}	6^{6}	3

Quarterfinals
(France) G Simon	7^{7}	6
4	(France) R Gasquet	6^{4}	2
(Moldova) R Albot	7^{7}	6
(Lithuania) R Berankis	6^{4}	4

Semifinals
(France) G Simon	6	6
(Moldova) R Albot	3	1

== Qualifying ==
=== Seeds ===
1. (Germany) Yannick Maden (qualifying competition, lucky loser)
2. (Australia) Bernard Tomic (first round)
3. (Ukraine) Sergiy Stakhovsky (first round)
4. (France) Grégoire Barrère (qualifying competition, lucky loser)
5. (Germany) Matthias Bachinger (qualified)
6. (Germany) Mats Moraing (qualifying competition)
7. (France) Constant Lestienne (qualified)
8. (France) Kenny de Schepper (first round)

=== Qualifiers ===
1. (Germany) Matthias Bachinger
2. (Australia) Bernard Tomic
3. (France) Constant Lestienne
4. (France) Kenny de Schepper

=== Lucky losers ===
1. (Germany) Yannick Maden
2. (France) Grégoire Barrère

=== Qualifying draw ===
==== First qualifier ====
First round
1	(Germany) Yannick Maden	7^{7}	6
(Germany) Oscar Otte	6^{1}	3
(Slovakia) Norbert Gombos	6^{3}	7^{7}	3
5	(Germany) Matthias Bachinger	7^{7}	6^{0}	6

Qualifying competition
1	(Germany) Yannick Maden	6^{6}	3
5	(Germany) Matthias Bachinger	7^{8}	6

==== Second qualifier ====
First round
2	(Australia) Bernard Tomic	7	7
(Croatia) Ante Pavić	5	5
(Germany) Tobias Kamke	6^{3}	2
6	(Germany) Mats Moraing	7^{7}	6

Qualifying competition
2	(Australia) Bernard Tomic	7^{8}	3	6
6	(Germany) Mats Moraing	6^{6}	6	3

==== Third qualifier ====
First round
3	(Ukraine) Sergiy Stakhovsky	3	4
Alt	(France) Maxime Janvier	6	6
WC	(France) Boris Fassbender	2	1
7	(France) Constant Lestienne	6	6

Qualifying competition
Alt	(France) Maxime Janvier	4	4
7	(France) Constant Lestienne	6	6

==== Fourth qualifier ====
First round
4	(France) Grégoire Barrère	6	7^{7}
WC	(France) Arthur Rinderknech	3	6^{4}
(Germany) Dustin Brown	4	4
8	(France) Kenny de Schepper	6	6

Qualifying competition
4	(France) Grégoire Barrère	6^{4}	7^{7}	6^{3}
8	(France) Kenny de Schepper	7^{7}	6^{5}	7^{7}
