= 2016 Moselle Open =

- Date: 19–25 September
- Edition: 14th
- Category: World Tour 250
- Draw: 28S / 16D
- Surface: Hard / indoor
- Location: Metz, France

Champions

Singles
- (France) Lucas Pouille

Doubles
- (Chile) Julio Peralta / (Argentina) Horacio Zeballos
- Moselle Open

The 2016 Moselle Open was a men's tennis tournament held in Metz, France and played on indoor hard courts. It was the 14th edition of the Moselle Open, and part of the ATP World Tour 250 series of the 2016 ATP World Tour. It was held at the Arènes de Metz from 19 September to 25 September 2016. Third-seeded Lucas Pouille won the singles title.

== Singles main-draw entrants ==
=== Seeds ===
Country	Player	Rank^{1}	Seed
AUT	Dominic Thiem	10	1
BEL	David Goffin	14	2
FRA	Lucas Pouille	18	3
FRA	Gilles Simon	28	4
SVK	Martin Kližan	31	5
LUX	Gilles Müller	37	6
FRA	Benoît Paire	38	7
FRA	Nicolas Mahut	40	8

- ^{1} Rankings are as of September 12, 2016.

=== Other entrants ===
The following players received wild cards into the singles main draw:

- (France) Julien Benneteau
- (France) Quentin Halys
- (Spain) Tommy Robredo

The following players received entry from the singles qualifying draw:

- (France) Grégoire Barrère
- (Georgia (country)) Nikoloz Basilashvili
- (Germany) Peter Gojowczyk
- (France) Vincent Millot

=== Withdrawals ===
Before the tournament

- (Argentina) Carlos Berlocq →replaced by (Germany) Jan-Lennard Struff
- (Spain) Marcel Granollers →replaced by (Germany) Dustin Brown
- (Germany) Philipp Kohlschreiber →replaced by (Spain) Íñigo Cervantes
- (Argentina) Guido Pella →replaced by (France) Pierre-Hugues Herbert
- (France) Jo-Wilfried Tsonga (left knee injury) →replaced by (Croatia) Ivan Dodig

== Doubles main-draw entrants ==
=== Seeds ===
Country	Player	Country	Player	Rank^{1}	Seed
FRA	Julien Benneteau	FRA	Édouard Roger-Vasselin	50	1
AUT	Oliver Marach	FRA	Fabrice Martin	65	2
CRO	Mate Pavić	NZL	Michael Venus	76	3
SWE	Robert Lindstedt	PAK	Aisam-ul-Haq Qureshi	79	4

- Rankings are as of September 12, 2016

=== Other entrants ===
The following pairs received wildcards into the doubles main draw:

- (France) Grégoire Barrère / (France) Albano Olivetti
- (Austria) Jürgen Melzer / (Austria) Dominic Thiem

== Finals ==
=== Singles ===
- (France) Lucas Pouille defeated (Austria) Dominic Thiem, 7–6^{(7–5)}, 6–2

=== Doubles ===
- (Chile) Julio Peralta / (Argentina) Horacio Zeballos defeated (Croatia) Mate Pavić / (New Zealand) Michael Venus, 6–3, 7–6^{(7–4)}
