= 2017 Moselle Open – Singles =

Tennis tournament

Singles
- 2017 Moselle Open

Final
- Champion: (Germany) Peter Gojowczyk
- Runner-up: (France) Benoît Paire
- Score: 7–5, 6–2

Details
- Draw: 28 (4 Q / 3 WC )
- Seeds: 8

Events
Singles	Doubles
← 2016 ·	Moselle Open	· 2018 →

Lucas Pouille was the defending champion, but lost in the second round to Marius Copil.

Peter Gojowczyk won his first and only ATP World Tour title, defeating Benoît Paire in the final, 7–5, 6–2.

== Seeds ==
The top four seeds receive a bye into the second round.

1. (Spain) Pablo Carreño Busta (withdrew)
2. (Belgium) David Goffin (quarterfinals)
3. (France) Lucas Pouille (second round)
4. (Luxembourg) Gilles Müller (second round)
5. (Germany) Mischa Zverev (semifinals, retired)
6. (France) Richard Gasquet (first round)
7. (France) Benoît Paire (final)
8. (France) Gilles Simon (second round)

== Draw ==
=== Key ===
- Q = Qualifier
- WC = Wild card
- LL = Lucky loser
- Alt = Alternate
- ITF = ITF entry
- PR = Protected ranking
- SR = Special ranking
- SE = Special exempt
- JE = Junior exempt
- JR = Junior Accelerator Programme entrant
- CO = College Accelerator Programme entrant
- NG = Next Gen Accelerator Program entrant
- w/o = Walkover
- r = Retired
- d = Defaulted

=== Finals ===
Semifinals
5	(Germany) Mischa Zverev	3	0^{r}
Q	(Germany) Peter Gojowczyk	6	1
(Georgia (country)) Nikoloz Basilashvili	1	6^{5}
7	(France) Benoît Paire	6	7^{7}

Finals
Q	(Germany) Peter Gojowczyk	7	6
7	(France) Benoît Paire	5	2

=== Top half ===
First round
WC	(Germany) D Brown	1	6^{4}
WC	(France) N Mahut	6	7^{7}
WC	(France) P-H Mathieu	5	2
(Switzerland) H Laaksonen	7	6
(France) P-H Herbert	7^{7}	3	2
5	(Germany) M Zverev	6^{3}	6	6
(Italy) A Giannessi	3	2
(Romania) M Copil	6	6
(Slovakia) N Gombos	6	6^{4}	3
Q	(Germany) P Gojowczyk	3	7^{7}	6
(Italy) A Seppi	3	0
8	(France) G Simon	6	6

Second round
LL	(France) K de Schepper	6	7
WC	(France) N Mahut	4	5
(Switzerland) H Laaksonen	4	4
5	(Germany) M Zverev	6	6
3	(France) L Pouille	6^{4}	6^{6}
(Romania) M Copil	7^{7}	7^{8}
Q	(Germany) P Gojowczyk	6	7^{7}
8	(France) G Simon	4	6^{4}

Quarterfinals
LL	(France) K de Schepper	5	6^{4}
5	(Germany) M Zverev	7	7^{7}
(Romania) M Copil	2	4
Q	(Germany) P Gojowczyk	6	6

Semifinals
5	(Germany) M Zverev	3	0^{r}
Q	(Germany) P Gojowczyk	6	1

=== Bottom half ===
First round
6	(France) R Gasquet	6	4	4
(Uzbekistan) D Istomin	1	6	6
LL	(Germany) Y Maden	6	3	6
(Argentina) N Kicker	4	6	3
(Georgia (country)) N Basilashvili	2	7^{7}	6
Q	(France) V Millot	6	6^{5}	4
7	(France) B Paire	6	6
Q	(Greece) S Tsitsipas	2	4
Q	(Italy) S Bolelli	6^{9}	6	6^{8}
(Spain) M Granollers	7^{11}	3	7^{10}
(Spain) N Almagro	7^{7}	7
(France) J Benneteau	6^{3}	5

Second round
(Uzbekistan) D Istomin	6	6^{6}	7^{7}
LL	(Germany) Y Maden	3	7^{8}	6^{0}
(Georgia (country)) N Basilashvili	6	6
4	(Luxembourg) G Müller	4	4
7	(France) B Paire	6	6
(Spain) M Granollers	1	2
(Spain) N Almagro	6	3	3
2	(Belgium) D Goffin	3	6	6

Quarterfinals
(Uzbekistan) D Istomin	5	3
(Georgia (country)) N Basilashvili	7	6
7	(France) B Paire	7^{7}	5	7^{9}
2	(Belgium) D Goffin	6^{3}	7	6^{7}

Semifinals
(Georgia (country)) N Basilashvili	1	6^{5}
7	(France) B Paire	6	7^{7}

== Qualifying ==
=== Seeds ===
1. (Germany) Peter Gojowczyk (qualified)
2. (Germany) Dustin Brown (moved to main draw)
3. (Greece) Stefanos Tsitsipas (qualified)
4. (France) Vincent Millot (qualified)
5. (Germany) Yannick Maden (qualifying competition, lucky loser)
6. (France) Calvin Hemery (first round)
7. (Germany) Tobias Kamke (first round)
8. (France) Kenny de Schepper (qualifying competition, lucky loser)

=== Qualifiers ===
1. (Germany) Peter Gojowczyk
2. (Italy) Simone Bolelli
3. (Greece) Stefanos Tsitsipas
4. (France) Vincent Millot

=== Lucky losers ===
1. (Germany) Yannick Maden
2. (France) Kenny de Schepper

=== Qualifying draw ===
==== First qualifier ====
First round
1	(Germany) Peter Gojowczyk	6	6
(France) Gleb Sakharov	4	2
(Belgium) Yannick Mertens	7	6
6	(France) Calvin Hemery	5	1

Qualifying competition
1	(Germany) Peter Gojowczyk	6	6
(Belgium) Yannick Mertens	3	4

==== Second qualifier ====
First round
Alt	(Argentina) Guillermo Durán	6	1	6^{5}
WC	(France) Ugo Humbert	2	6	7^{7}
PR	(Italy) Simone Bolelli	7^{7}	6
7	(Germany) Tobias Kamke	6^{4}	3

Qualifying competition
WC	(France) Ugo Humbert	6	6^{4}	6^{5}
PR	(Italy) Simone Bolelli	3	7^{7}	7^{7}

==== Third qualifier ====
First round
3	(Greece) Stefanos Tsitsipas	6	7
(Spain) Roberto Ortega Olmedo	2	5
WC	(France) Hugo Schott	2	5
5	(Germany) Yannick Maden	6	7

Qualifying competition
3	(Greece) Stefanos Tsitsipas	6	6^{7}	6
5	(Germany) Yannick Maden	4	7^{9}	3

==== Fourth qualifier ====
First round
4	(France) Vincent Millot	7	6
(Spain) Bernabé Zapata Miralles	5	4
(France) Axel Michon	1	2
8	(France) Kenny de Schepper	6	6

Qualifying competition
4	(France) Vincent Millot	7	7^{8}
8	(France) Kenny de Schepper	5	6^{6}
