= 2015 Eskişehir Cup – Singles =

Singles
- 2015 Eskişehir Cup

Final
- Champion: (Italy) Paolo Lorenzi
- Runner-up: (Spain) Íñigo Cervantes
- Score: 7–6^{(7–4)}, 7–6^{(7–5)}

Events
| Singles | Doubles |
| ← 2013 · | Eskişehir Cup |

David Goffin was the defending champion, but chose not to participate, since he played at French Open during that week.

Paolo Lorenzi won the tournament, defeating Íñigo Cervantes in the final. Lorenzi's quarterfinal match was his 300th win on the ATP Challenger Tour.

== Seeds ==
1. (Italy) Paolo Lorenzi (champion)
2. (Spain) Íñigo Cervantes (final)
3. (Chinese Taipei) Chen Ti (first round)
4. (India) Saketh Myneni (second round)
5. (Australia) Matthew Ebden (quarterfinals)
6. (Austria) Dennis Novak (first round)
7. (Brazil) Henrique Cunha (first round)
8. (France) Rémi Boutillier (semifinals)

== Draw ==
=== Key ===
- Q = Qualifier
- WC = Wild card
- LL = Lucky loser
- Alt = Alternate
- SE = Special exempt
- PR = Protected ranking
- ITF = ITF entry
- JE = Junior exempt
- w/o = Walkover
- r = Retired
- d = Defaulted
- SR = Special ranking

=== Finals ===
Semifinals
1 | (Italy) Paolo Lorenzi | 6 | 6
8 | (France) Rémi Boutillier | 2 | 4
(France) Yannick Jankovits | 2 | 2
2 | (Spain) Íñigo Cervantes | 6 | 6

Final
1 | (Italy) Paolo Lorenzi | 7^{7} | 7^{7}
2 | (Spain) Íñigo Cervantes | 6^{4} | 6^{5}

=== Top half ===
First round
1 | (Italy) P Lorenzi | 6 | 6
(Slovakia) I Klec | 2 | 2
WC | (Turkey) B Ergüden | 6^{3} | 6^{2}
WC | (Turkey) C İlkel | 7^{7} | 7^{7}
(United Kingdom) J Milton | 2 | 7^{7} | 6
WC | (Slovenia) G Žemlja | 6 | 6^{5} | 0
(Serbia) N Milojević | 2 | 1
5 | (Australia) M Ebden | 6 | 6
4 | (India) S Myneni | 7 | 7
(Croatia) N Mektić | 5 | 5
(Serbia) P Krstin | 7^{7} | 6
(Japan) Y Uchiyama | 6^{4} | 4
(Italy) R Bellotti | 7 | 6
(Spain) O Roca Batalla | 3 | 5
(Portugal) FF Silva | 5 | 3
8 | (France) R Boutillier | 7 | 6

Second round
1 | (Italy) P Lorenzi | 6 | 7
WC | (Turkey) C İlkel | 1 | 5
(United Kingdom) J Milton | 3 | 6^{6}
5 | (Australia) M Ebden | 6 | 7^{8}
4 | (India) S Myneni | 4 | 2
(Serbia) P Krstin | 6 | 6
(Italy) R Bellotti | 6 | 6^{4} | 4
8 | (France) R Boutillier | 3 | 7^{7} | 6

Quarterfinals
1 | (Italy) P Lorenzi | 7 | 7^{7}
5 | (Australia) M Ebden | 5 | 6^{1}
(Serbia) P Krstin | 6 | 5 | 2
8 | (France) R Boutillier | 4 | 7 | 6

Semifinals
1 | (Italy) P Lorenzi | 6 | 6
8 | (France) R Boutillier | 2 | 4

=== Bottom half ===
First round
6 | (Austria) D Novak | 2 | 6 | 6^{5}
Q | (Croatia) F Veger | 6 | 2 | 7^{7}
WC | (Turkey) A Yüksel | 0 | 2
(France) Y Jankovits | 6 | 6
Q | (Venezuela) R Rodríguez | 4 | 2
(Switzerland) M Chiudinelli | 6 | 6
(Belarus) D Zhyrmont | 7^{8} | 6
3 | (Chinese Taipei) T Chen | 6^{6} | 3
7 | (Brazil) Henrique Cunha | 4 | 7^{8} | 3
Q | (Belarus) Y Shyla | 6 | 6^{6} | 6
(United States) Connor Smith | 2 | 7^{7} | 6^{4}
(Switzerland) A Bossel | 6 | 6^{3} | 7^{7}
(Bosnia and Herzegovina) T Brkić | 6^{2} | 6 | 6
(Bulgaria) D Kuzmanov | 7^{7} | 1 | 4
Q | (South Africa) T Vorster | 4 | 4
2 | (Spain) I Cervantes | 6 | 6

Second round
Q | (Croatia) F Veger | 3 | 4
(France) Y Jankovits | 6 | 6
(Switzerland) M Chiudinelli | 6 | 4 | 6
(Belarus) D Zhyrmont | 1 | 6 | 3
Q | (Belarus) Y Shyla | 0 | 7^{8} | 4
(Switzerland) A Bossel | 6 | 6^{6} | 6
(Bosnia and Herzegovina) T Brkić | 7^{7} | 2 | 4
2 | (Spain) I Cervantes | 6^{4} | 6 | 6

Quarterfinals
(France) Y Jankovits | 6 | 7^{7}
(Switzerland) M Chiudinelli | 2 | 6^{3}
(Switzerland) A Bossel | 2 | 4
2 | (Spain) I Cervantes | 6 | 6

Semifinals
(France) Y Jankovits | 2 | 2
2 | (Spain) I Cervantes | 6 | 6
