= 2018 Moselle Open =

- Date: 17–23 September
- Edition: 16th
- Category: ATP World Tour 250 series
- Surface: Hard / indoor
- Location: Metz, France
- Venue: Arènes de Metz

Champions

Singles
- (France) Gilles Simon

Doubles
- (France) Nicolas Mahut / (France) Édouard Roger-Vasselin
- Moselle Open

The 2018 Moselle Open was a men's tennis tournament held in Metz, France and played on indoor hard courts. It was the 16th edition of the Moselle Open, and part of the ATP World Tour 250 series of the 2018 ATP World Tour. It was held at the Arènes de Metz from 17 September to 23 September 2018. Unseeded Gilles Simon won the singles title.

== Singles main-draw entrants ==
=== Seeds ===
Country	Player	Rank^{1}	Seed
JPN	Kei Nishikori	12	1
GRE	Stefanos Tsitsipas	15	2
FRA	~~Lucas Pouille~~	~~19~~	~~3~~
FRA	Richard Gasquet	24	4
GEO	Nikoloz Basilashvili	31	5
FRA	Adrian Mannarino	32	6
SRB	Filip Krajinović	33	7
GER	~~Philipp Kohlschreiber~~	~~36~~	~~8~~

- ^{1} Rankings are as of September 10, 2018.

=== Other entrants ===
The following players received wild cards into the singles main draw:

- (France) Quentin Halys
- (France) Ugo Humbert
- (France) Corentin Moutet

The following players received entry from the singles qualifying draw:

- (Germany) Matthias Bachinger
- (France) Constant Lestienne
- (France) Kenny de Schepper
- (Australia) Bernard Tomic

The following player received entry as a lucky loser:

- (France) Grégoire Barrère
- (Germany) Yannick Maden

=== Withdrawals ===
Before the tournament

- (Romania) Marius Copil → replaced by (Estonia) Jürgen Zopp
- (Germany) Philipp Kohlschreiber → replaced by (Germany) Yannick Maden
- (France) Lucas Pouille → replaced by (France) Grégoire Barrère

== Doubles main-draw entrants ==
=== Seeds ===
Country	Player	Country	Player	Rank^{1}	Seed
FRA	Nicolas Mahut	FRA	Édouard Roger-Vasselin	43	1
PAK	Aisam-ul-Haq Qureshi	NZL	Artem Sitak	74	2
NED	Wesley Koolhof	ARG	Andrés Molteni	92	3
GBR	Ken Skupski	GBR	Neal Skupski	106	4

- Rankings are as of September 10, 2018

=== Other entrants ===
The following pairs received wildcards into the doubles main draw:

- (France) Jo-Wilfried Tsonga / (France) Ugo Humbert
- (France) Lucas Pouille / (France) Grégoire Barrère

The following pair received entry as alternates:

- (Netherlands) Sander Arends / (Monaco) Romain Arneodo

=== Withdrawals ===
Before the tournament

- (Germany) Mischa Zverev

== Champions ==
=== Singles ===
- (France) Gilles Simon def. (Germany) Matthias Bachinger, 7–6^{(7–2)}, 6–1.

=== Doubles ===
- (France) Nicolas Mahut / (France) Édouard Roger-Vasselin def. (United Kingdom) Ken Skupski / (United Kingdom) Neal Skupski 6–1, 7–5.
