= 2014 Moselle Open – Doubles =

Doubles
- 2014 Moselle Open

Final
- Champions: (Poland) Mariusz Fyrstenberg (Poland) Marcin Matkowski
- Runners-up: (Croatia) Marin Draganja (Finland) Henri Kontinen
- Score: 6–7^{(3–7)}, 6–3, [10–8]

Events
Singles	Doubles
← 2013 ·	Moselle Open	· 2015 →

Johan Brunström and Raven Klaasen were the defending champions, but Klaasen chose not to participate. Brunström plays alongside Philipp Oswald, but they lost in the first round to Tomasz Bednarek and André Sá.
Mariusz Fyrstenberg and Marcin Matkowski won the title, defeating Marin Draganja and Henri Kontinen in the final, 6–7^{(3–7)}, 6–3, [10–8].

== Seeds ==
1. (France) Nicolas Mahut / (France) Édouard Roger-Vasselin (withdrew)
2. (United Kingdom) Dominic Inglot / (Romania) Florin Mergea (quarterfinals)
3. (Poland) Mariusz Fyrstenberg / (Poland) Marcin Matkowski (champions)
4. (Croatia) Marin Draganja / (Finland) Henri Kontinen (final)

== Draw ==
=== Key ===
- Q = Qualifier
- WC = Wild card
- LL = Lucky loser
- Alt = Alternate
- SE = Special exempt
- PR = Protected ranking
- ITF = ITF entry
- JE = Junior exempt
- w/o = Walkover
- r = Retired
- d = Defaulted
- SR = Special ranking

=== Draw ===
First round
Alt	(Ukraine) S Bubka (Ukraine) S Stakhovsky	6	3	[7]
(France) J Chardy (Czech Republic) L Rosol	3	6	[10]
WC	(France) J Eysseric (France) A Mannarino	0	6^{8}
(United Kingdom) J Marray (United Kingdom) J Murray	6	7^{10}
4	(Croatia) M Draganja (Finland) H Kontinen	4	6	[10]
(United Kingdom) C Fleming (New Zealand) M Venus	6	4	[7]
(Sweden) J Brunström (Austria) P Oswald	3	4
(Poland) T Bednarek (Brazil) A Sá	6	6
(Australia) R Junaid (New Zealand) A Sitak	4	3
Alt	(Germany) F Moser (Germany) A Satschko	6	6
(Italy) D Bracciali (Austria) O Marach	6	2	[5]
3	(Poland) M Fyrstenberg (Poland) M Matkowski	4	6	[10]
(Germany) A Begemann (Austria) J Knowle	3	6	[10]
(Germany) B Becker (Luxembourg) G Müller	6	4	[6]
WC	(France) M Gicquel (France) P-H Herbert	4	4
2	(United Kingdom) D Inglot (Romania) F Mergea	6	6

Quarterfinals
(France) J Chardy (Czech Republic) L Rosol	3	2
(United Kingdom) J Marray (United Kingdom) J Murray	6	6
4	(Croatia) M Draganja (Finland) H Kontinen	6	6^{5}	[10]
(Poland) T Bednarek (Brazil) A Sá	3	7^{7}	[7]
Alt	(Germany) F Moser (Germany) A Satschko	4	6^{4}
3	(Poland) M Fyrstenberg (Poland) M Matkowski	6	7^{7}
(Germany) A Begemann (Austria) J Knowle	7^{7}	7^{7}
2	(United Kingdom) D Inglot (Romania) F Mergea	6^{5}	6^{1}

Semifinals
(United Kingdom) J Marray (United Kingdom) J Murray	4	3
4	(Croatia) M Draganja (Finland) H Kontinen	6	6
3	(Poland) M Fyrstenberg (Poland) M Matkowski	4	6	[12]
(Germany) A Begemann (Austria) J Knowle	6	3	[10]

Final
4	(Croatia) M Draganja (Finland) H Kontinen	7^{7}	3	[8]
3	(Poland) M Fyrstenberg (Poland) M Matkowski	6^{3}	6	[10]
