= 2016 Moselle Open – Singles =

Singles
- 2016 Moselle Open

Final
- Champion: (France) Lucas Pouille
- Runner-up: (Austria) Dominic Thiem
- Score: 7–6^{(7–5)}, 6–2

Details
- Draw: 28
- Seeds: 8

Events
Singles	Doubles
← 2015 ·	Moselle Open	· 2017 →

Jo-Wilfried Tsonga was the defending champion, but withdrew with a left knee injury before the tournament began.

Lucas Pouille won the title, defeating Dominic Thiem in the final, 7–6^{(7–5)}, 6–2.

== Seeds ==
The top four seeds receive a bye into the second round.

1. (Austria) Dominic Thiem (final)
2. (Belgium) David Goffin (semifinals)
3. (France) Lucas Pouille (champion)
4. (France) Gilles Simon (semifinals)
5. (Slovakia) Martin Kližan (first round)
6. (Luxembourg) Gilles Müller (quarterfinals)
7. (France) Benoît Paire (first round)
8. (France) Nicolas Mahut (quarterfinals)

== Draw ==
=== Key ===
- Q = Qualifier
- WC = Wild card
- LL = Lucky loser
- Alt = Alternate
- SE = Special exempt
- PR = Protected ranking
- ITF = ITF entry
- JE = Junior exempt
- w/o = Walkover
- r = Retired
- d = Defaulted
- SR = Special ranking

=== Finals ===
Semifinals
1	(Austria) Dominic Thiem	4	7	6
4	(France) Gilles Simon	6	5	3
3	(France) Lucas Pouille	7^{8}	6
2	(Belgium) David Goffin	6^{6}	1

Final
1	(Austria) Dominic Thiem	6^{5}	2
3	(France) Lucas Pouille	7^{7}	6

=== Top half ===
First round
Q	(Germany) P Gojowczyk	6	6^{11}	6
(Spain) N Almagro	4	7^{13}	3
Q	(Georgia (country)) N Basilashvili	5	7	6
Q	(France) G Barrère	7	5	2
(Argentina) H Zeballos	6^{5}	5
6	(Luxembourg) G Müller	7^{7}	7
(Bosnia and Herzegovina) D Džumhur	7	2	1
(Spain) G García López	5	6	6
(Tunisia) M Jaziri	6	7^{7}
(Croatia) I Dodig	4	6^{3}
Q	(France) V Millot	6	6
7	(France) B Paire	4	3

Second round
1	(Austria) D Thiem	7	7^{7}
Q	(Germany) P Gojowczyk	5	6^{2}
Q	(Georgia (country)) N Basilashvili	4	2
6	(Luxembourg) G Müller	6	6
4	(France) G Simon	6^{5}	6	6
(Spain) G García López	7^{7}	3	4
(Tunisia) M Jaziri	4	6	6
Q	(France) V Millot	6	3	3

Quarterfinals
1	(Austria) D Thiem	6	7^{7}
6	(Luxembourg) G Müller	4	6^{5}
4	(France) G Simon	7^{7}	6
(Tunisia) M Jaziri	6^{2}	0

Semifinals
1	(Austria) D Thiem	4	7	6
4	(France) G Simon	6	5	3

=== Bottom half ===
First round
5	(Slovakia) M Kližan	2	1
WC	(France) J Benneteau	6	6
(France) P-H Mathieu	4	2
(Germany) D Brown	6	6
(France) P-H Herbert	7^{7}	6
(Spain) Í Cervantes	6^{3}	2
8	(France) N Mahut	6	6
WC	(France) Q Halys	3	4
(Ukraine) I Marchenko	6^{1}	6	7^{7}
(Italy) A Seppi	7^{7}	3	6^{4}
(Germany) J-L Struff	7^{7}	7
WC	(Spain) T Robredo	6^{5}	5

Second round
WC	(France) J Benneteau	6	6
(Germany) D Brown	3	4
(France) P-H Herbert	4	7^{8}	4
3	(France) L Pouille	6	6^{6}	6
8	(France) N Mahut	6	6
(Ukraine) I Marchenko	3	4
(Germany) J-L Struff	4	2
2	(Belgium) D Goffin	6	6

Quarterfinals
WC	(France) J Benneteau	6^{2}	6	3
3	(France) L Pouille	7^{7}	4	6
8	(France) N Mahut	3	7^{8}	4
2	(Belgium) D Goffin	6	6^{6}	6

Semifinals
3	(France) L Pouille	7^{8}	6
2	(Belgium) D Goffin	6^{6}	1

== Qualifying ==
=== Seeds ===
1. (Georgia (country)) Nikoloz Basilashvili (qualified)
2. (Italy) Thomas Fabbiano (qualifying competition)
3. (France) Kenny de Schepper (qualifying competition)
4. (Germany) Michael Berrer (qualifying competition)
5. (France) Vincent Millot (qualified)
6. (Germany) Peter Gojowczyk (qualified)
7. (France) Constant Lestienne (qualifying competition, withdrew)
8. (France) Grégoire Barrère (qualified)

=== Qualifiers ===
1. (Georgia (country)) Nikoloz Basilashvili
2. (Germany) Peter Gojowczyk
3. (France) Grégoire Barrère
4. (France) Vincent Millot

=== Qualifying draw ===
==== First qualifier ====
First round
1	(Georgia (country)) Nikoloz Basilashvili	6	6
WC	(France) Hugo Schott	1	1
(Spain) Roberto Ortega Olmedo	3	6	1
7	(France) Constant Lestienne	6	3	6

Qualifying competition
1	(Georgia (country)) Nikoloz Basilashvili	w/o
7	(France) Constant Lestienne

==== Second qualifier ====
First round
2	(Italy) Thomas Fabbiano	6	6
(France) Mathias Bourgue	2	4
(Belgium) Julien Dubail	2	6	3
6	(Germany) Peter Gojowczyk	6	3	6

Qualifying competition
2	(Italy) Thomas Fabbiano	3	2
6	(Germany) Peter Gojowczyk	6	6

==== Third qualifier ====
First round
3	(France) Kenny de Schepper	6	7
PR	(France) Albano Olivetti	3	5
Alt	(New Zealand) Artem Sitak	3	4
8	(France) Grégoire Barrère	6	6

Qualifying competition
3	(France) Kenny de Schepper	4	6	3
8	(France) Grégoire Barrère	6	3	6

==== Fourth qualifier ====
First round
4	(Germany) Michael Berrer	6	6
WC	(Bulgaria) Adrian Andreev	3	2
Alt	(France) Fabrice Martin	4	2
5	(France) Vincent Millot	6	6

Qualifying competition
4	(Germany) Michael Berrer	4	2
5	(France) Vincent Millot	6	6
