= 2015 Moselle Open – Doubles =

Doubles
- 2015 Moselle Open

Final
- Champions: (Poland) Łukasz Kubot (France) Édouard Roger-Vasselin
- Runners-up: (France) Pierre-Hugues Herbert (France) Nicolas Mahut
- Score: 2–6, 6–3, [10–7]

Events
Singles	Doubles
← 2014 ·	Moselle Open	· 2016 →

Mariusz Fyrstenberg and Marcin Matkowski were the defending champions but chose not to participate this year.
Łukasz Kubot and Édouard Roger-Vasselin won the title, defeating Pierre-Hugues Herbert and Nicolas Mahut in the final, 2–6, 6–3, [10–7].

== Seeds ==
1. (France) Pierre-Hugues Herbert / (France) Nicolas Mahut (final)
2. (Poland) Łukasz Kubot / (France) Édouard Roger-Vasselin (champions)
3. (South Africa) Raven Klaasen / (United States) Rajeev Ram (semifinals)
4. (United States) Eric Butorac / (United States) Scott Lipsky (semifinals)

== Draw ==
=== Key ===
- Q = Qualifier
- WC = Wild card
- LL = Lucky loser
- Alt = Alternate
- SE = Special exempt
- PR = Protected ranking
- ITF = ITF entry
- JE = Junior exempt
- w/o = Walkover
- r = Retired
- d = Defaulted
- SR = Special ranking

=== Draw ===
First round
1	(France) P-H Herbert (France) N Mahut	6	6
(Austria) O Marach (Ukraine) S Stakhovsky	3	4
(Australia) C Guccione (Brazil) A Sá	6	6
(Croatia) M Pavić (New Zealand) M Venus	4	4
4	(United States) E Butorac (United States) S Lipsky	7^{7}	7
(Spain) D Marrero (Spain) F Verdasco	6^{2}	5
(United Kingdom) J Marray (Pakistan) A-u-H Qureshi	6	7^{7}
WC	(Luxembourg) G Müller (Luxembourg) M Scheidweiler	4	6^{3}
(New Zealand) M Daniell (Brazil) M Demoliner	7^{7}	6
WC	(Germany) A Zverev (Germany) M Zverev	6^{3}	4
(United Kingdom) A Bedene (Germany) D Brown	6^{2}	5
3	(South Africa) R Klaasen (United States) R Ram	7^{7}	7
(Spain) P Carreño Busta (Spain) G García López	7^{7}	1	[10]
(Germany) A Begemann (New Zealand) A Sitak	6^{3}	6	[4]
(France) A Mannarino (France) F Martin	2	6^{7}
2	(Poland) Ł Kubot (France) É Roger-Vasselin	6	7^{9}

Quarterfinals
1	(France) P-H Herbert (France) N Mahut	4	6	[10]
(Australia) C Guccione (Brazil) A Sá	6	4	[3]
4	(United States) E Butorac (United States) S Lipsky	7^{7}	7^{7}
(United Kingdom) J Marray (Pakistan) A-u-H Qureshi	6^{4}	6^{3}
(New Zealand) M Daniell (Brazil) M Demoliner	4	2
3	(South Africa) R Klaasen (United States) R Ram	6	6
(Spain) P Carreño Busta (Spain) G García López	4	6	[5]
2	(Poland) Ł Kubot (France) É Roger-Vasselin	6	3	[10]

Semifinals
1	(France) P-H Herbert (France) N Mahut	6	4	[10]
4	(United States) E Butorac (United States) S Lipsky	4	6	[3]
3	(South Africa) R Klaasen (United States) R Ram	5	6^{5}
2	(Poland) Ł Kubot (France) É Roger-Vasselin	7	7^{7}

Final
1	(France) P-H Herbert (France) N Mahut	6	3	[7]
2	(Poland) Ł Kubot (France) É Roger-Vasselin	2	6	[10]
