= 2017 Moselle Open – Doubles =

Doubles
- 2017 Moselle Open

Final
- Champions: (France) Julien Benneteau (France) Édouard Roger-Vasselin
- Runners-up: (Netherlands) Wesley Koolhof (New Zealand) Artem Sitak
- Score: 7–5, 6–3

Events
Singles	Doubles
← 2016 ·	Moselle Open	· 2018 →

Julio Peralta and Horacio Zeballos were the defending champions, but chose to compete in St. Petersburg instead.

Julien Benneteau and Édouard Roger-Vasselin won the title, defeating Wesley Koolhof and Artem Sitak in the final, 7–5, 6–3.

== Seeds ==
1. (France) Pierre-Hugues Herbert / (France) Nicolas Mahut (withdrew)
2. (Mexico) Santiago González / (Serbia) Nenad Zimonjić (first round)
3. (France) Julien Benneteau / (France) Édouard Roger-Vasselin (champions)
4. (Spain) Marcel Granollers / (Spain) David Marrero (quarterfinals)

== Draw ==
=== Key ===
- Q = Qualifier
- WC = Wild card
- LL = Lucky loser
- Alt = Alternate
- SE = Special exempt
- PR = Protected ranking
- ITF = ITF entry
- JE = Junior exempt
- w/o = Walkover
- r = Retired
- d = Defaulted
- SR = Special ranking

=== Draw ===
First round
1	(France) P-H Herbert (France) N Mahut
(Argentina) G Durán (Argentina) A Molteni	w/o
WC	(France) P-H Mathieu (France) B Paire	5	7^{12}	[10]
WC	(Monaco) R Arneodo (France) H Nys	7	6^{10}	[7]
3	(France) J Benneteau (France) É Roger-Vasselin	6	6
PR	(Italy) S Bolelli (Italy) A Seppi	4	4
(France) L Pouille (France) G Simon	2	4
(Germany) A Begemann (France) J Eysseric	6	6
(Netherlands) W Koolhof (New Zealand) A Sitak	6	7^{7}
(Belarus) A Bury (Germany) M Zverev	4	6^{3}
(United States) S Lipsky (Canada) A Shamasdin	4	6^{6}
4	(Spain) M Granollers (Spain) D Marrero	6	7^{8}
(India) D Sharan (United Kingdom) N Skupski	4	2
(Philippines) T Huey (France) F Martin	6	6
(Belarus) M Mirnyi (Austria) P Oswald	6	7^{7}
2	(Mexico) S González (Serbia) N Zimonjić	4	6^{5}

Quarterfinals
(Argentina) G Durán (Argentina) A Molteni	3	6	[6]
WC	(France) P-H Mathieu (France) B Paire	6	4	[10]
3	(France) J Benneteau (France) É Roger-Vasselin	5	6	[10]
(Germany) A Begemann (France) J Eysseric	7	2	[6]
(Netherlands) W Koolhof (New Zealand) A Sitak	6	5	[10]
4	(Spain) M Granollers (Spain) D Marrero	2	7	[8]
(Philippines) T Huey (France) F Martin	4	4
(Belarus) M Mirnyi (Austria) P Oswald	6	6

Semifinals
WC	(France) P-H Mathieu (France) B Paire	4	4
3	(France) J Benneteau (France) É Roger-Vasselin	6	6
(Netherlands) W Koolhof (New Zealand) A Sitak	6	3	[10]
(Belarus) M Mirnyi (Austria) P Oswald	4	6	[7]

Final
3	(France) J Benneteau (France) É Roger-Vasselin	7	6
(Netherlands) W Koolhof (New Zealand) A Sitak	5	3
