= 2018 Moselle Open – Doubles =

Doubles
- 2018 Moselle Open

Final
- Champions: (France) Nicolas Mahut; (France) Édouard Roger-Vasselin
- Runners-up: (United Kingdom) Ken Skupski; (United Kingdom) Neal Skupski
- Score: 6–1, 7–5

Events
Singles	Doubles
← 2017 ·	Moselle Open	· 2019 →

Julien Benneteau and Édouard Roger-Vasselin were the defending champions, but Benneteau decided not to participate this year.

Roger-Vasselin played alongside Nicolas Mahut and successfully defended his title, defeating Ken and Neal Skupski in the final, 6–1, 7–5.

== Seeds ==
1. (France) Nicolas Mahut / (France) Édouard Roger-Vasselin (champions)
2. (Pakistan) Aisam-ul-Haq Qureshi / (New Zealand) Artem Sitak (first round)
3. (Netherlands) Wesley Koolhof / (Argentina) Andrés Molteni (semifinals)
4. (United Kingdom) Ken Skupski / (United Kingdom) Neal Skupski (final)

== Draw ==
=== Key ===
- Q = Qualifier
- WC = Wild card
- LL = Lucky loser
- Alt = Alternate
- SE = Special exempt
- PR = Protected ranking
- ITF = ITF entry
- JE = Junior exempt
- w/o = Walkover
- r = Retired
- d = Defaulted
- SR = Special ranking

First round

Quarterfinals

Semifinals

Final

1
(France) N Mahut
(France) É Roger-Vasselin
6
7

- (United Kingdom) L Bambridge
- (United Kingdom) J Salisbury
3
5

1
(France) N Mahut
(France) É Roger-Vasselin
7^{7}
6

(Germany) P Gojowczyk
(France) F Martin
2
6
[10]

- (Germany) P Gojowczyk
- (France) F Martin
6^{4}
4

Alt
- (Netherlands) S Arends
- (Monaco) R Arneodo
6
3
[5]

1
(France) N Mahut
(France) É Roger-Vasselin
6
6

3
(Netherlands) W Koolhof
(Argentina) A Molteni
6
7^{7}

3
- (Netherlands) W Koolhof
- (Argentina) A Molteni
1
1

- (Spain) G Granollers
- (Spain) M Granollers
4
6^{2}

3
(Netherlands) W Koolhof
(Argentina) A Molteni
7^{7}
6

- (Mexico) S González
- (Spain) D Marrero
7^{7}
3
[7]

- (France) H Nys
- (France) B Paire
6^{2}
2

(France) H Nys
(France) B Paire
6^{3}
6
[10]

1
(France) N Mahut
(France) É Roger-Vasselin
6
7

WC
- (France) U Humbert
- (France) J-W Tsonga
7
4
[8]

4
- (United Kingdom) K Skupski
- (United Kingdom) N Skupski
1
5

(Moldova) R Albot
(Georgia (country)) N Basilashvili
5
6
[10]

- (Moldova) R Albot
- (Georgia (country)) N Basilashvili
3
4

WC
- (France) G Barrère
- (France) L Pouille
6^{5}
6
[7]

4
(United Kingdom) K Skupski
(United Kingdom) N Skupski
6
6

4
(United Kingdom) K Skupski
(United Kingdom) N Skupski
7^{7}
3
[10]

4
(United Kingdom) K Skupski
(United Kingdom) N Skupski
4
6
[10]

- (France) J Eysseric
- (France) A Mannarino
4
0

PR
- (Austria) O Marach
- (Austria) J Melzer
6
3
[5]

(United States) J Cerretani
(Israel) J Erlich
6
6

- (United States) J Cerretani
- (Israel) J Erlich
3
6
[5]

PR
(Austria) O Marach
(Austria) J Melzer
6
6

PR
(Austria) O Marach
(Austria) J Melzer
6
1
[10]

2
- (Pakistan) A-u-H Qureshi
- (New Zealand) A Sitak
4
3
