= 2017 Moselle Open =

- Date: 18–24 September
- Edition: 15th
- Category: World Tour 250
- Draw: 28S / 16D
- Prize money: €482,060
- Surface: Hard / indoor
- Location: Metz, France

Champions

Singles
- (Germany) Peter Gojowczyk

Doubles
- (France) Julien Benneteau / (France) Édouard Roger-Vasselin
- Moselle Open

The 2017 Moselle Open was a tennis tournament held in Metz, France and played on indoor hard courts. It was the 15th edition of the Moselle Open, and part of the ATP World Tour 250 series of the 2017 ATP World Tour. It was held at the Arènes de Metz from 18 September to 24 September 2017. Unseeded Peter Gojowczyk, who entered the main draw as a qualifier, won the singles title.

== Singles main-draw entrants ==
=== Seeds ===
Country	Player	Rank^{1}	Seed
ESP	~~Pablo Carreño Busta~~	~~10~~	~~1~~
BEL	David Goffin	12	2
FRA	Lucas Pouille	22	3
LUX	Gilles Müller	23	4
GER	Mischa Zverev	27	5
FRA	Richard Gasquet	30	6
FRA	Benoît Paire	41	7
FRA	Gilles Simon	43	8

- ^{1} Rankings are as of September 11, 2017.

=== Other entrants ===
The following players received wild cards into the singles main draw:

- (Germany) Dustin Brown
- (France) Nicolas Mahut
- (France) Paul-Henri Mathieu

The following players received entry from the singles qualifying draw:

- (Italy) Simone Bolelli
- (Germany) Peter Gojowczyk
- (France) Vincent Millot
- (Greece) Stefanos Tsitsipas

The following players received entry as lucky losers:

- (Germany) Yannick Maden
- (France) Kenny de Schepper

=== Withdrawals ===
Before the tournament

- (Spain) Pablo Carreño Busta →replaced by (France) Kenny de Schepper
- (Slovenia) Blaž Kavčič →replaced by (Switzerland) Henri Laaksonen
- (Germany) Florian Mayer →replaced by (Germany) Yannick Maden
- (Israel) Dudi Sela →replaced by (Spain) Marcel Granollers

=== Retirements ===
- (Germany) Mischa Zverev

== Doubles main-draw entrants ==
=== Seeds ===
Country	Player	Country	Player	Rank^{1}	Seed
~~FRA~~	~~Pierre-Hugues Herbert~~	~~FRA~~	~~Nicolas Mahut~~	~~13~~	~~1~~
MEX	Santiago González	SRB	Nenad Zimonjić	77	2
FRA	Julien Benneteau	FRA	Édouard Roger-Vasselin	87	3
ESP	Marcel Granollers	ESP	David Marrero	87	4

- Rankings are as of September 11, 2017

=== Other entrants ===
The following pairs received wildcards into the doubles main draw:

- (Monaco) Romain Arneodo / (France) Hugo Nys
- (France) Paul-Henri Mathieu / (France) Benoît Paire

=== Withdrawals ===
Before the tournament

- (France) Pierre-Hugues Herbert

== Finals ==
=== Singles ===
- (Germany) Peter Gojowczyk defeated (France) Benoît Paire, 7–5, 6–2.

=== Doubles ===
- (France) Julien Benneteau / (France) Édouard Roger-Vasselin defeated (Netherlands) Wesley Koolhof / (New Zealand) Artem Sitak, 7–5, 6–3.
