= 2016 Moselle Open – Doubles =

Doubles
- 2016 Moselle Open

Final
- Champions: (Chile) Julio Peralta (Argentina) Horacio Zeballos
- Runners-up: (Croatia) Mate Pavić (New Zealand) Michael Venus
- Score: 6–3, 7–6^{(7–4)}

Events
| Singles | Doubles |
| ← 2015 · | Moselle Open | · 2017 → |

Łukasz Kubot and Édouard Roger-Vasselin were the defending champions, but Kubot chose not to participate this year. Roger-Vasselin played alongside Julien Benneteau, but lost in the first round to Marcus Daniell and Marcelo Demoliner.

Julio Peralta and Horacio Zeballos won the title, defeating Mate Pavić and Michael Venus in the final, 6–3, 7–6^{(7–4)}.

== Seeds ==
1. (France) Julien Benneteau / (France) Édouard Roger-Vasselin (first round)
2. (Austria) Oliver Marach / (France) Fabrice Martin (semifinals)
3. (Croatia) Mate Pavić / (New Zealand) Michael Venus (final)
4. (Sweden) Robert Lindstedt / (Pakistan) Aisam-ul-Haq Qureshi (quarterfinals)

== Draw ==
=== Key ===
- Q = Qualifier
- WC = Wild card
- LL = Lucky loser
- Alt = Alternate
- SE = Special exempt
- PR = Protected ranking
- ITF = ITF entry
- JE = Junior exempt
- w/o = Walkover
- r = Retired
- d = Defaulted
- SR = Special ranking

=== Draw ===
First round
1 | (France) J Benneteau (France) É Roger-Vasselin | 2 | 6 | [7]
(New Zealand) M Daniell (Brazil) M Demoliner | 6 | 2 | [10]
(United Kingdom) C Fleming (United States) S Lipsky | 4 | 7^{7} | [10]
WC | (Austria) J Melzer (Austria) D Thiem | 6 | 6^{5} | [8]
3 | (Croatia) M Pavić (New Zealand) M Venus | 5 | 6 | [11]
(Mexico) S González (Spain) D Marrero | 7 | 1 | [9]
(Austria) J Knowle (Italy) A Seppi | 2 | 7 | [6]
(United States) N Monroe (New Zealand) A Sitak | 6 | 5 | [10]
(Chile) J Peralta (Argentina) H Zeballos | w/o
(Germany) D Brown (France) B Paire
WC | (France) G Barrère (France) A Olivetti | 3 | 7^{9} | [7]
4 | (Sweden) R Lindstedt (Pakistan) A-u-H Qureshi | 6 | 6^{7} | [10]
(Germany) G Kretschmer (Germany) J-L Struff | 1 | 7 | [10]
(United Kingdom) K Skupski (United Kingdom) N Skupski | 6 | 5 | [6]
(Australia) C Guccione (Brazil) A Sá | 4 | 5
2 | (Austria) O Marach (France) F Martin | 6 | 7

Quarterfinals
(New Zealand) M Daniell (Brazil) M Demoliner | 7 | 6^{3} | [11]
(United Kingdom) C Fleming (United States) S Lipsky | 5 | 7^{7} | [13]
3 | (Croatia) M Pavić (New Zealand) M Venus | 6 | 7^{7}
(United States) N Monroe (New Zealand) A Sitak | 2 | 6^{5}
(Chile) J Peralta (Argentina) H Zeballos | 4 | 6 | [10]
4 | (Sweden) R Lindstedt (Pakistan) A-u-H Qureshi | 6 | 3 | [5]
(Germany) G Kretschmer (Germany) J-L Struff | 1 | 3
2 | (Austria) O Marach (France) F Martin | 6 | 6

Semifinals
(United Kingdom) C Fleming (United States) S Lipsky | 6^{4} | 1
3 | (Croatia) M Pavić (New Zealand) M Venus | 7^{7} | 6
(Chile) J Peralta (Argentina) H Zeballos | 6^{1} | 6 | [10]
2 | (Austria) O Marach (France) F Martin | 7^{7} | 4 | [8]

Final
3 | (Croatia) M Pavić (New Zealand) M Venus | 3 | 6^{4}
(Chile) J Peralta (Argentina) H Zeballos | 6 | 7^{7}
