= 2015 Moselle Open =

- Date: 21–27 September
- Edition: 13th
- Category: World Tour 250
- Draw: 28S / 16D
- Surface: Hard / indoor
- Location: Metz, France
- Venue: Arènes de Metz

Champions

Singles
- (France) Jo-Wilfried Tsonga

Doubles
- (Poland) Łukasz Kubot / (France) Édouard Roger-Vasselin
- Moselle Open

The 2015 Moselle Open was a men's tennis tournament held in Metz, France and played on indoor hard courts. It was the 13th edition of the Moselle Open, and part of the ATP World Tour 250 series of the 2015 ATP World Tour. It was held at the Arènes de Metz from 21 to 27 September 2015. Third-seeded Jo-Wilfried Tsonga won the singles title.

== Singles main-draw entrants ==
=== Seeds ===
Country	Player	Rank^{1}	Seed
SUI	Stan Wawrinka	4	1
FRA	Gilles Simon	10	2
FRA	Jo-Wilfried Tsonga	17	3
ESP	Guillermo García López	31	4
GER	Philipp Kohlschreiber	34	5
SVK	Martin Kližan	36	6
FRA	Adrian Mannarino	39	7
ESP	Fernando Verdasco	43	8

- ^{1} Rankings are as of September 14, 2015.

=== Other entrants ===
The following players received wild cards into the singles main draw:

- (France) Pierre-Hugues Herbert
- (Germany) Philipp Kohlschreiber
- (Spain) Fernando Verdasco

The following players received entry from the singles qualifying draw:

- (France) Vincent Millot
- (France) Édouard Roger-Vasselin
- (France) Kenny de Schepper
- (Germany) Mischa Zverev

=== Withdrawals ===
Before the tournament

- (France) Julien Benneteau →replaced by Aleksandr Nedovyesov

During the tournament

- (Switzerland) Stan Wawrinka

== Doubles main-draw entrants ==
=== Seeds ===
Country	Player	Country	Player	Rank^{1}	Seed
FRA	Pierre-Hugues Herbert	FRA	Nicolas Mahut	21	1
POL	Łukasz Kubot	FRA	Édouard Roger-Vasselin	52	2
RSA	Raven Klaasen	USA	Rajeev Ram	72	3
USA	Eric Butorac	USA	Scott Lipsky	86	4

- Rankings are as of September 14, 2015

=== Other entrants ===
The following pairs received wildcards into the doubles main draw:

- (Luxembourg) Gilles Müller / (Luxembourg) Mike Scheidweiler
- (Germany) Alexander Zverev / (Germany) Mischa Zverev

== Finals ==
=== Singles ===
- (France) Jo-Wilfried Tsonga defeated (France) Gilles Simon, 7–6^{(7–5)}, 1–6, 6–2

=== Doubles ===
- (Poland) Łukasz Kubot / (France) Édouard Roger-Vasselin defeated (France) Pierre-Hugues Herbert / (France) Nicolas Mahut, 2–6, 6–3, [10–7]
