= 2014 Moselle Open – Singles =

Singles
- 2014 Moselle Open

Final
- Champion: (Belgium) David Goffin
- Runner-up: (Portugal) João Sousa
- Score: 6–4, 6–3

Details
- Draw: 28
- Seeds: 8

Events
Singles	Doubles
← 2013 ·	Moselle Open	· 2015 →

Gilles Simon was the defending champion, but withdrew with a right wrist injury before the tournament began.

David Goffin won the title, defeating João Sousa in the final, 6–4, 6–3.

== Seeds ==
The top four seeds receive a bye into the second round.

1. (France) Jo-Wilfried Tsonga (quarterfinals)
2. (France) Gaël Monfils (semifinals)
3. (Germany) Philipp Kohlschreiber (quarterfinals, retired)
4. (Czech Republic) Lukáš Rosol (second round)
5. (France) Jérémy Chardy (second round)
6. (Portugal) João Sousa (final)
7. (Poland) Jerzy Janowicz (quarterfinals)
8. (Belgium) David Goffin (champion)

== Draw ==
=== Key ===
- Q = Qualifier
- WC = Wild card
- LL = Lucky loser
- Alt = Alternate
- SE = Special exempt
- PR = Protected ranking
- ITF = ITF entry
- JE = Junior exempt
- w/o = Walkover
- r = Retired
- d = Defaulted
- SR = Special ranking

=== Finals ===
Semifinals
8	(Belgium) David Goffin	7^{7}	6
(Germany) Jan-Lennard Struff	6^{4}	3
6	(Portugal) João Sousa	7^{8}	6
2	(France) Gaël Monfils	6^{6}	2

Final
8	(Belgium) David Goffin	6	6
6	(Portugal) João Sousa	4	3

=== Top half ===
First round
(France) É Roger-Vasselin	1	6^{6}
(Luxembourg) G Müller	6	7^{8}
Q	(France) K de Schepper	3	6^{5}
(Germany) T Kamke	6	7^{7}
Q	(France) F Serra	2	2
8	(Belgium) D Goffin	6	6
WC	(France) L Lokoli	2	4
(Italy) P Lorenzi	6	6
(Serbia) D Lajović	7^{8}	3	3
(Germany) J-L Struff	6^{6}	6	6
WC	(France) N Mahut	6^{5}	5
5	(France) J Chardy	7^{7}	7

Second round
1	(France) J-W Tsonga	7^{9}	6
(Luxembourg) G Müller	6^{7}	4
(Germany) T Kamke	1	3
8	(Belgium) D Goffin	6	6
3	(Germany) P Kohlschreiber	6	7
(Italy) P Lorenzi	3	5
(Germany) J-L Struff	6^{5}	6	6
5	(France) J Chardy	7^{7}	3	4

Quarterfinals
1	(France) J-W Tsonga	6	6^{5}	5
8	(Belgium) D Goffin	1	7^{7}	7
3	(Germany) P Kohlschreiber	0^{r}
(Germany) J-L Struff	5

Semifinals
8	(Belgium) D Goffin	7^{7}	6
(Germany) J-L Struff	6^{4}	3

=== Bottom half ===
First round
6	(Portugal) J Sousa	6	6
(Croatia) I Dodig	2	2
(Italy) A Seppi	0	1^{r}
(Netherlands) I Sijsling	6	4
WC	(France) P-H Mathieu	7^{7}	7^{7}
(Germany) B Becker	6^{2}	6^{3}
7	(Poland) J Janowicz	2	7^{7}	6
(France) A Mannarino	6	6^{5}	4
(Finland) J Nieminen	6	6
(Ukraine) S Stakhovsky	1	4
Q	(France) P-H Herbert	4	6	6^{4}
Q	(Poland) M Przysiężny	6	3	7^{7}

Second round
6	(Portugal) J Sousa	6	3	7^{7}
(Netherlands) I Sijsling	3	6	6^{3}
WC	(France) P-H Mathieu	6	6
4	(Czech Republic) L Rosol	3	4
7	(Poland) J Janowicz	6	6
(Finland) J Nieminen	4	4
Q	(Poland) M Przysiężny	5	1
2	(France) G Monfils	7	6

Quarterfinals
6	(Portugal) J Sousa	3	6	7^{7}
WC	(France) P-H Mathieu	6	3	6^{4}
7	(Poland) J Janowicz	3	4
2	(France) G Monfils	6	6

Semifinals
6	(Portugal) J Sousa	7^{8}	6
2	(France) G Monfils	6^{6}	2

== Qualifying ==
=== Seeds ===
1. (France) Kenny de Schepper (qualified)
2. (France) Pierre-Hugues Herbert (qualified)
3. (Poland) Michał Przysiężny (qualified)
4. (Germany) Matthias Bachinger (qualifying competition)
5. (France) Jonathan Eysseric (first round)
6. (Republic of Ireland) Sam Barry (first round)
7. (Russia) Alexander Lobkov (first round)
8. (Switzerland) Adrien Bossel (qualifying competition)

=== Qualifiers ===
1. (France) Kenny de Schepper
2. (France) Pierre-Hugues Herbert
3. (Poland) Michał Przysiężny
4. (France) Florent Serra

=== Qualifying draw ===
==== First qualifier ====
First round
(Ukraine) Vadim Alekseenko	4	1
(France) Elie Rousset	6	6
(France) Alexandre Sidorenko	6	6
(Russia) Alexander Zhurbin	0	0
(France) Julien Mathieu	6	5	6
5	(France) Jonathan Eysseric	3	7	4

Second round
1	(France) Kenny de Schepper	6	6
(France) Elie Rousset	4	2
(France) Alexandre Sidorenko	2	6^{3}
(France) Julien Mathieu	6	7^{7}

Qualifying competition
1	(France) Kenny de Schepper	6	7
(France) Julien Mathieu	0	5

==== Second qualifier ====
First round
(Ukraine) Gleb Alekseenko	3	1
WC	(France) Corentin Moutet	6	6
(Germany) Karl Wegner	0	2
(Republic of Ireland) Daniel Glancy	6	6
(Luxembourg) Ugo Nastasi	6^{5}	3
8	(Switzerland) Adrien Bossel	7^{7}	6

Second round
2	(France) Pierre-Hugues Herbert	6	7^{7}
WC	(France) Corentin Moutet	0	6^{1}
(Republic of Ireland) Daniel Glancy	6	2	6^{4}
8	(Switzerland) Adrien Bossel	3	6	7^{7}

Qualifying competition
2	(France) Pierre-Hugues Herbert	3	6	6
8	(Switzerland) Adrien Bossel	6	3	3

==== Third qualifier ====
First round
3	(Poland) Michał Przysiężny	6	6
(France) Simon Cauvard	2	2
(United Kingdom) Dominic Inglot	2	2
(Croatia) Filip Veger	6	6
WC	(France) Hugo Schott	6	6
(Germany) Maximilian Dinslaken	1	4
(Germany) Mats Moraing	6	6
6	(Republic of Ireland) Sam Barry	1	1

Second round
3	(Poland) Michał Przysiężny	6	2	6
(Croatia) Filip Veger	1	6	3
WC	(France) Hugo Schott	4	5
(Germany) Mats Moraing	6	7

Qualifying competition
3	(Poland) Michał Przysiężny	6^{6}	6	6
(Germany) Mats Moraing	7^{8}	4	3

==== Fourth qualifier ====
First round
4	(Germany) Matthias Bachinger	6^{1}	6	6
(France) Grégoire Barrère	7^{7}	5	4
(Germany) Jan Oliver Sadlowski	2	1
(Brazil) André Sá	6	6
(Russia) Alexandr Igoshin	1	0
(France) Constant Lestienne	6	6
(France) Florent Serra	6	6
7	(Russia) Alexander Lobkov	1	0

Second round
4	(Germany) Matthias Bachinger	6	6
(Brazil) André Sá	2	3
(France) Constant Lestienne	5	3
(France) Florent Serra	7	6

Qualifying competition
4	(Germany) Matthias Bachinger	4	5
(France) Florent Serra	6	7
