= 2019 Moselle Open =

- Date: 16–22 September
- Edition: 17th
- Category: ATP Tour 250 series
- Surface: Hard / indoor
- Location: Metz, France
- Venue: Arènes de Metz

Champions

Singles
- (France) Jo-Wilfried Tsonga

Doubles
- (Sweden) Robert Lindstedt / (Germany) Jan-Lennard Struff
- Moselle Open

The 2019 Moselle Open was a men's tennis tournament played on indoor hard courts. It was the 17th edition of the Moselle Open, and part of the ATP Tour 250 Series of the 2019 ATP Tour. It took place at the Arènes de Metz from 16 September to 22 September 2019. Unseeded Jo-Wilfried Tsonga won the singles title.

== Finals ==
=== Singles ===
- (France) Jo-Wilfried Tsonga defeated (Slovenia) Aljaž Bedene, 6–7^{(4–7)}, 7–6^{(7–4)}, 6–3

=== Doubles ===
- (Sweden) Robert Lindstedt / (Germany) Jan-Lennard Struff defeated (France) Nicolas Mahut / (France) Édouard Roger-Vasselin, 2–6, 7–6^{(7–1)}, [10–4]

== Singles main-draw entrants ==
=== Seeds ===
Country	Player	Rank^{1}	Seed
BEL	David Goffin	14	1
GEO	Nikoloz Basilashvili	17	2
FRA	Benoît Paire	23	3
FRA	Lucas Pouille	26	4
ESP	Fernando Verdasco	35	5
POL	Hubert Hurkacz	36	6
FRA	Gilles Simon	37	7
GER	Jan-Lennard Struff	39	8

- ^{1} Rankings are as of 9 September 2019

=== Other entrants ===
The following players received wildcards into the singles main draw:

- (France) Grégoire Barrère
- (France) Antoine Hoang
- (France) Rayane Roumane

The following players received entry using a protected ranking into the singles main draw:

- (Belgium) Steve Darcis
- (Germany) Cedrik-Marcel Stebe

The following players received entry from the qualifying draw:

- (Spain) Marcel Granollers
- (Germany) Julian Lenz
- (Germany) Yannick Maden
- (Germany) Oscar Otte

=== Withdrawals ===
- (France) Jérémy Chardy → replaced by (Slovenia) Aljaž Bedene
- (Croatia) Marin Čilić → replaced by (Germany) Cedrik-Marcel Stebe
- (Argentina) Leonardo Mayer → replaced by (Romania) Marius Copil
- (Spain) Albert Ramos Viñolas → replaced by (Belgium) Steve Darcis

=== Retirements ===
- (Georgia (country)) Nikoloz Basilashvili

== Doubles main-draw entrants ==
=== Seeds ===
Country	Player	Country	Player	Rank^{1}	Seed
FRA	Nicolas Mahut	FRA	Édouard Roger-Vasselin	28	1
GBR	Luke Bambridge	JPN	Ben McLachlan	97	2
GBR	Jonny O'Mara	GBR	Ken Skupski	102	3
MEX	Santiago González	PAK	Aisam-ul-Haq Qureshi	116	4

- Rankings are as of 9 September 2019

=== Other entrants ===
The following pairs received wildcards into the doubles main draw:

- (France) Dan Added / (France) Albano Olivetti
- (France) Tristan Lamasine / (France) Jo-Wilfried Tsonga
