= 2013 Eskişehir Cup =

- Date: 15–21 July
- Edition: 1st
- Surface: Hard
- Location: Eskişehir, Turkey

Champions

Singles
- (Belgium) David Goffin

Doubles
- (Croatia) Marin Draganja / (Croatia) Mate Pavić
Eskişehir Cup	· 2015 →

The 2013 Eskişehir Cup was a professional tennis tournament played on hard courts. It was the 1st edition of the tournament which was part of the 2013 ATP Challenger Tour. It took place in Eskişehir, Turkey between 15 and 21 July 2013.

== Singles main-draw entrants ==
=== Seeds ===
Country	Player	Rank^{1}	Seed
~~ISR~~	~~Dudi Sela~~	~~94~~	~~1~~
BEL	David Goffin	107	2
RUS	Teymuraz Gabashvili	136	3
BLR	Uladzimir Ignatik	155	4
SUI	Marco Chiudinelli	164	5
TUR	Marsel İlhan	177	6
SVK	Karol Beck	203	7
BLR	Dzmitry Zhyrmont	224	8

- ^{1} Rankings are as of July 9, 2013.

=== Other entrants ===
The following players received wildcards into the singles main draw:

- (Turkey) Durukan Durmuş
- (Turkey) Barış Ergüden
- (Turkey) Cem İlkel
- (Turkey) Anıl Yüksel

The following players received entry as alternates into the singles main draw:

- (Slovenia) Blaž Rola

The following players received entry from the qualifying draw:

- (Greece) Alexandros Jakupovic
- (Russia) Alexander Kudryavtsev
- (United Kingdom) David Rice
- (Croatia) Filip Veger

The following players received entry as lucky losers into the singles main draw:

- (Israel) Gilad Ben Zvi
- (Spain) Jaime Pulgar-García

== Champions ==
=== Singles ===
- (Belgium) David Goffin def. (Turkey) Marsel İlhan, 4–6, 7–5, 6–2

=== Doubles ===
- (Croatia) Marin Draganja / (Croatia) Mate Pavić def. (Thailand) Sanchai Ratiwatana / (Thailand) Sonchat Ratiwatana, 6–3, 3–6, [10–7]
