= Eskişehir Cup =

Defunct tennis tournament
- Event name: Eskişehir Challenger
- Founded: 2013
- Abolished: 2015
- Location: Eskişehir, Turkey
- Category: ATP Challenger Tour
- Surface: Hard
- Draw: 32S/32Q/16D
- Prize money: €42,500

The Eskişehir Cup was a professional tennis tournament played on outdoor hard courts.

It was part of the ATP Challenger Tour. The first edition took place in July 2013. The second edition took place in May 2015.

== Past finals ==
=== Singles ===
Year	Champions	Runners-up	Score
2015	(Italy) Paolo Lorenzi	(Spain) Íñigo Cervantes	7–6^{(7–4)}, 7–6^{(7–5)}
2013	(Belgium) David Goffin	(Turkey) Marsel İlhan	4–6, 7–5, 6–2

=== Doubles ===
Year	Champions	Runners-up	Score
2015	(Belarus) Sergey Betov (Russia) Mikhail Elgin	(Chinese Taipei) Chen Ti (South Africa) Ruan Roelofse	6–4, 6–7^{(2–7)}, [10–7]
2013	(Croatia) Marin Draganja (Croatia) Mate Pavić	(Thailand) Sonchat Ratiwatana (Thailand) Sanchai Ratiwatana	6–3, 3–6, [10–7]
