= 2013 Eskişehir Cup – Singles =

Singles
- 2013 Eskişehir Cup

Final
- Champion: (Belgium) David Goffin
- Runner-up: (Turkey) Marsel İlhan
- Score: 4–6, 7–5, 6–2

Events
Singles	Doubles
Eskişehir Cup	· 2015 →

This was the first edition of the tournament.

David Goffin won the title, defeating Marsel İlhan in the final, 4–6, 7–5, 6–2.

== Seeds ==
1. (Israel) Dudi Sela (withdrew)
2. (Belgium) David Goffin (champion)
3. (Russia) Teymuraz Gabashvili (semifinals)
4. (Belarus) Uladzimir Ignatik (second round)
5. (Switzerland) Marco Chiudinelli (semifinals)
6. (Turkey) Marsel İlhan (final)
7. (Slovakia) Karol Beck (quarterfinals)
8. (Belarus) Dzmitry Zhyrmont (second round)

== Draw ==
=== Key ===
- Q = Qualifier
- WC = Wild card
- LL = Lucky loser
- Alt = Alternate
- SE = Special exempt
- PR = Protected ranking
- ITF = ITF entry
- JE = Junior exempt
- w/o = Walkover
- r = Retired
- d = Defaulted
- SR = Special ranking

=== Finals ===
Semifinals
6	(Turkey) Marsel İlhan	6	6^{2}	6
3	(Russia) Teymuraz Gabashvili	4	7^{7}	3
5	(Switzerland) Marco Chiudinelli	2	6	3
2	(Belgium) David Goffin	6	4	6

Final
6	(Turkey) Marsel İlhan	6	5	2
2	(Belgium) David Goffin	4	7	6

=== Top half ===
First round
LL	(Israel) Gilad Ben Zvi	3	4
Alt	(Slovenia) B Rola	6	6
WC	(Turkey) A Yüksel	4	1
(Austria) M Neuchrist	6	6
(France) Jules Marie	6	6
(India) S Balaji	2	2
(Croatia) M Pavić	4	3
6	(Turkey) M İlhan	6	6
3	(Russia) T Gabashvili	6	7
(Slovakia) Adrian Sikora	1	5
(Georgia (country)) N Basilashvili	6	7^{7}
(Chile) H Podlipnik Castillo	2	6^{5}
LL	(Spain) Jaime Pulgar-García	4	3
(Spain) E López Pérez	6	6
WC	(Turkey) Durukan Durmuş	0	2
8	(Belarus) D Zhyrmont	6	6

Second round
Alt	(Slovenia) B Rola	4	6	6^{3}
(Austria) M Neuchrist	6	5	7^{7}
(France) J Marie	6^{1}	4
6	(Turkey) M İlhan	7^{7}	6
3	(Russia) T Gabashvili	3	6	6
(Georgia (country)) N Basilashvili	6	3	3
(Spain) E López Pérez	3	6	6
8	(Belarus) D Zhyrmont	6	3	4

Quarterfinals
(Austria) M Neuchrist	3	3
6	(Turkey) M İlhan	6	6
3	(Russia) T Gabashvili	4	7^{7}	6
(Spain) E López Pérez	6	6^{3}	0

Semifinals
6	(Turkey) M İlhan	6	6^{2}	6
3	(Russia) T Gabashvili	4	7^{7}	3

=== Bottom half ===
First round
5	(Switzerland) M Chiudinelli	4	7	6
Q	(Russia) A Kudryavtsev	6	5	3
WC	(Turkey) B Ergüden	1	6	6^{3}
Q	(United Kingdom) D Rice	6	3	7^{7}
WC	(Turkey) C İlkel	3	2
(United Kingdom) E Corrie	6	6
(Ukraine) A Smirnov	1	1
4	(Belarus) U Ignatik	6	6
7	(Slovakia) K Beck	6	6
Q	(Croatia) F Veger	4	4
(Egypt) M Safwat	4	3
(Hungary) M Fucsovics	6	6
(China) T Chen	3	4
Q	(Greece) A Jakupovic	6	6
(United Kingdom) B Klein	4	1
2	(Belgium) D Goffin	6	6

Second round
5	(Switzerland) M Chiudinelli	5	6	6
Q	(United Kingdom) D Rice	7	3	4
(United Kingdom) E Corrie	6	6
4	(Belarus) U Ignatik	1	4
7	(Slovakia) K Beck	6	6
(Hungary) M Fucsovics	2	2
Q	(Greece) A Jakupovic	2	0
2	(Belgium) D Goffin	6	6

Quarterfinals
5	(Switzerland) M Chiudinelli	6	6
(United Kingdom) E Corrie	1	4
7	(Slovakia) K Beck	3	3
2	(Belgium) D Goffin	6	6

Semifinals
5	(Switzerland) M Chiudinelli	2	6	3
2	(Belgium) D Goffin	6	4	6
