= Rayan Ghedjemis =

French tennis player

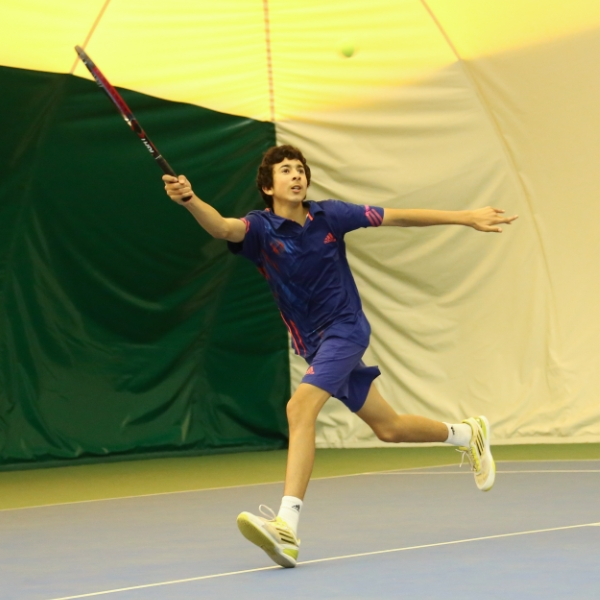
- Roumane in 2014
- Country (sports): Algeria (from 2022); France (before 2022)
- Residence: Bagnolet, France
- Born: 11 September 2000 (age 25) Montreuil, France
- Height: 1.93 m (6 ft 4 in)
- Plays: Right-handed (two-handed backhand)
- Prize money: $32,282

Singles
- Career record: 0–1 (at ATP Tour level, Grand Slam level, and in Davis Cup)
- Career titles: 1 ITF
- Highest ranking: No. 358 (18 November 2019)

Grand Slam singles results
- French Open: Q1 (2020)

Doubles
- Career record: 0–0 (at ATP Tour level, Grand Slam level, and in Davis Cup)
- Career titles: 0 ITF
- Highest ranking: No. 805 (1 July 2019)
- Last updated on: 21 October 2019.

Rayan Ghedjemis (née Roumane; born 11 September 2000) is an Algerian tennis player who previously represented France.

Ghedjemis won Les Petits As in 2014. He has a career high ATP singles ranking of 400 achieved on 30 September 2019. He also has a career high ATP doubles ranking of 805 achieved on 1 July 2019. Ghedjemis made his ATP main draw debut at the 2019 Moselle Open after receiving a wildcard for the singles main draw.

Born in France, Ghedjemis is of Algerian descent. In May 2022, he changed his name from Rayane Roumane to Rayan Ghedjemis, alongside his nationality from French to Algerian.
