= Julien Mathieu =

French tennis player

- Country (sports): France
- Born: 22 April 1982 (age 42)
- Prize money: $32,340

Singles
- Career record: 0–1 (at ATP Tour level, Grand Slam level, and in Davis Cup)
- Career titles: 0
- Highest ranking: No. 562 (24 September 2007)

Doubles
- Career record: 0–2 (at ATP Tour level, Grand Slam level, and in Davis Cup)
- Career titles: 2 ITF
- Highest ranking: No. 735 (9 July 2001)

Julien Mathieu (born 22 April 1982) is a former French tennis player.

Mathieu achieved a career-high ATP singles ranking of 562 on 24 September 2007. He also reached a career-high ATP doubles ranking of 735 on 9 July 2001.

Mathieu made his ATP main draw debut at the 2006 Grand Prix de Tennis de Lyon, where he qualified for the singles main draw.
