= Marin Draganja =

Croatian tennis player (born 1991)

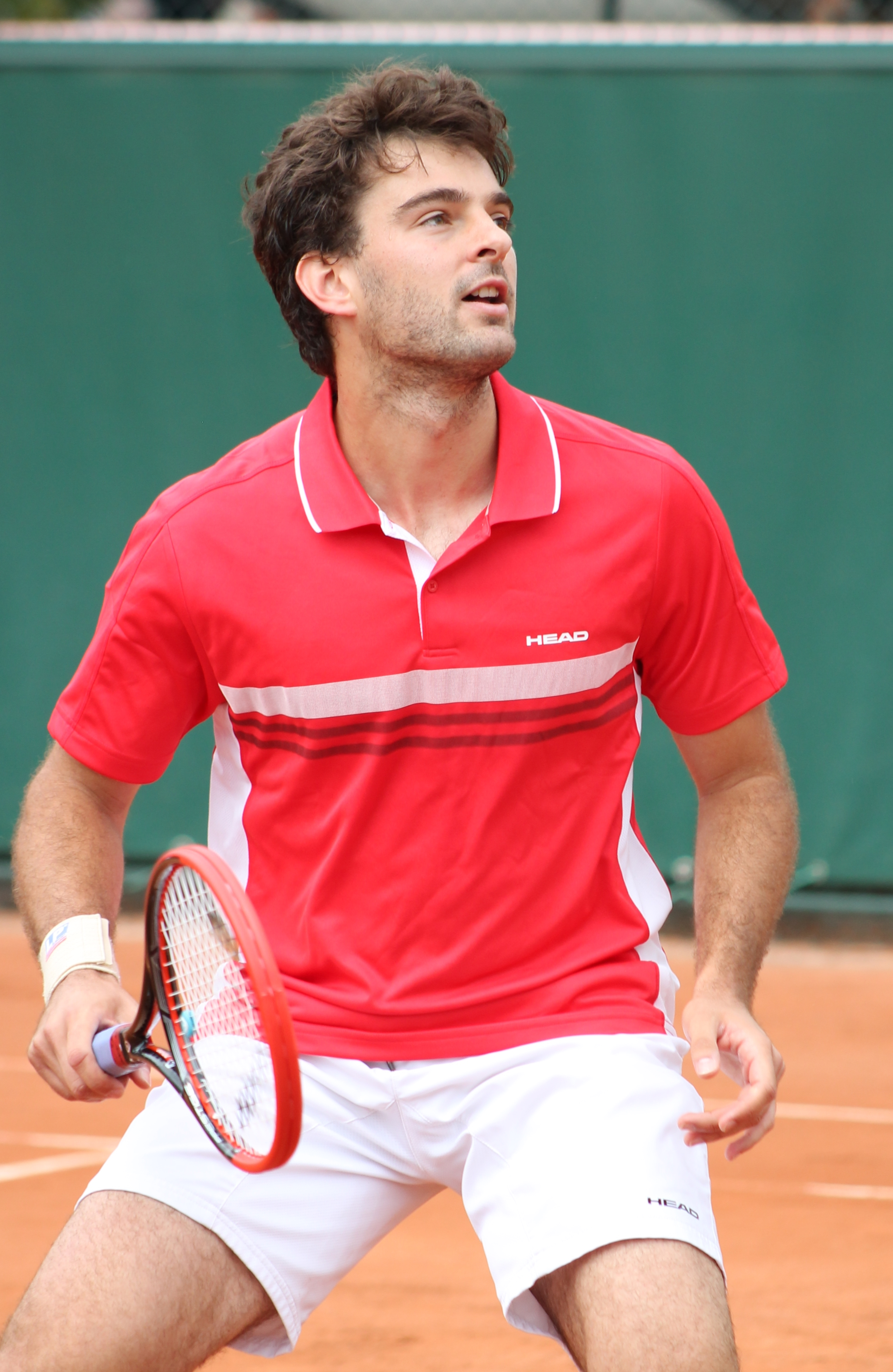
- Country (sports): Croatia
- Residence: Split, Croatia
- Born: 13 May 1991 (age 34) Split, SR Croatia, SFR Yugoslavia
- Height: 1.85 m (6 ft 1 in)
- Turned pro: 2009
- Retired: 2018 (last match)
- Plays: Right-handed (one-handed backhand)
- Coach: Gilbert Schaller
- Prize money: $604,226

Singles
- Career record: 0–1 (ATP Tour and Grand Slam main draws, and in Davis Cup)
- Career titles: 0
- Highest ranking: No. 550 (29 April 2013)

Doubles
- Career record: 63–59 (ATP Tour and Grand Slam main draws, and in Davis Cup)
- Career titles: 4
- Highest ranking: No. 20 (6 April 2015)

Grand Slam doubles results
- Australian Open: 2R (2014)
- French Open: SF (2014)
- Wimbledon: 1R (2014, 2015, 2016)
- US Open: 2R (2014)

Marin Draganja (Croatian pronunciation: [mâriːn drǎɡaɲa]; born 13 May 1991) is a Croatian former professional tennis player who competed mainly on the ATP World Tour in doubles. Draganja reached his highest ATP doubles ranking of world No. 20 on 6 April 2015 and highest ATP singles ranking of No. 550 on 29 April 2013.

== Personal info ==
After having a hip surgery in August 2015 Draganja paused his career for recovery. Marin Draganja was coached by Gilbert Schaller and managed by the McCartney Group, Vienna.

His younger brother is professional tennis player Tomislav Draganja.

== ATP career finals ==
=== Doubles: 9 (4 titles, 5 runner-ups) ===
Legend Grand Slam tournaments (0–0) ATP World Tour Finals (0–0) ATP World Tour Masters 1000 (0–0) ATP World Tour 500 Series (2–1) ATP World Tour 250 Series (2–4)	Titles by surface Hard (2–3) Clay (2–2) Grass (0–0)	Titles by setting Outdoor (2–3) Indoor (2–2)

Result	W–L	Date	Tournament	Tier	Surface	Partner	Opponents	Score
Loss	0–1	Jan 2014	Chennai Open, India	250 Series	Hard	(Croatia) Mate Pavić	(Sweden) Johan Brunström (Denmark) Frederik Nielsen	2–6, 6–4, [7–10]
Win	1–1	Jul 2014	German Open, Germany	500 Series	Clay	(Romania) Florin Mergea	(Austria) Alexander Peya (Brazil) Bruno Soares	6–4, 7–5
Loss	1–2	Sep 2014	Moselle Open, France	250 Series	Hard (i)	(Finland) Henri Kontinen	(Poland) Mariusz Fyrstenberg (Poland) Marcin Matkowski	7–6^{(7–3)}, 3–6, [8–10]
Loss	1–3	Nov 2014	Swiss Indoors, Switzerland	500 Series	Hard (i)	(Finland) Henri Kontinen	(Canada) Vasek Pospisil (Serbia) Nenad Zimonjić	6–7^{(13–15)}, 6–1, [5–10]
Win	2–3	Feb 2015	Zagreb Indoors, Croatia	250 Series	Hard (i)	(Finland) Henri Kontinen	(France) Fabrice Martin (India) Purav Raja	6–4, 6–4
Win	3–3	Feb 2015	Open 13, France	250 Series	Hard (i)	(Finland) Henri Kontinen	(United Kingdom) Colin Fleming (United Kingdom) Jonathan Marray	6–4, 3–6, [10–8]
Win	4–3	Apr 2015	Barcelona Open, Spain	500 Series	Clay	(Finland) Henri Kontinen	(United Kingdom) Jamie Murray (Australia) John Peers	6–3, 6–7^{(6–8)}, [11–9]
Loss	4–4	Apr 2016	Grand Prix Hassan II, Morocco	250 Series	Clay	(Pakistan) Aisam-ul-Haq Qureshi	(Argentina) Guillermo Durán (Argentina) Máximo González	2–6, 6–3, [6–10]
Loss	4–5	Jul 2017	Croatia Open, Croatia	250 Series	Clay	(Croatia) Tomislav Draganja	(Argentina) Guillermo Durán (Argentina) Andrés Molteni	3–6, 7–6^{(7–4)}, [6–10]

== Challenger finals ==
=== Doubles: 16 (13–3) ===
Legend ATP Challenger Tour (13–3)	Finals by surface Hard (5–1) Clay (8–2) Grass (0–0) Carpet (0–0)

Result	No.	Date	Tournament	Surface	Partnering	Opponents	Score
Win	1.	15 April 2012	Blumenau, Brazil	Clay	(Croatia) Dino Marcan	(Slovenia) Blaž Kavčič (Croatia) Antonio Veić	6–2, 6–0
Loss	1.	7 July 2012	Arad, Romania	Clay	(Croatia) Dino Marcan	(Croatia) Nikola Mektić (Croatia) Antonio Veić	6–7^{(5–7)}, 6–4, [3–10]
Loss	2.	21 July 2012	Recanati, Italy	Hard	(Croatia) Dino Marcan	(Australia) Dane Propoggia (Australia) Brydan Klein	5–7, 6–2, [12–14]
Win	2.	12 August 2012	Sibiu, Romania	Clay	(Croatia) Lovro Zovko	(Romania) Alexandru-Daniel Carpen (Chile) Cristóbal Saavedra-Corvalán	6–4, 4–6, [11–9]
Win	3.	16 September 2012	Banja Luka, Bosnia and Herzegovina	Clay	(Croatia) Lovro Zovko	(Australia) Colin Ebelthite (Czech Republic) Jaroslav Pospíšil	6–1, 6–1
Win	4.	31 March 2013	San Luis Potosí, Mexico	Clay	(Spain) Adrián Menéndez-Maceiras	(Switzerland) Marco Chiudinelli (Germany) Peter Gojowczyk	6–4, 6–3
Win	5.	14 April 2013	Guadalajara, Mexico	Hard	(Croatia) Mate Pavić	(Australia) Samuel Groth (Australia) John-Patrick Smith	5–7, 6–2, [13–11]
Win	6.	6 July 2013	Portorož, Slovenia	Hard	(Croatia) Mate Pavić	(Slovenia) Aljaž Bedene (Slovenia) Blaž Rola	6–3, 1–6, [10–5]
Win	7.	20 July 2013	Eskişehir, Turkey	Hard	(Croatia) Mate Pavić	(Thailand) Sanchai Ratiwatana (Thailand) Sonchat Ratiwatana	6–3, 3–6, [10–7]
Win	8.	17 August 2013	Cordenons, Italy	Clay	(Croatia) Franko Škugor	(Slovakia) Norbert Gomboš (Czech Republic) Roman Jebavý	6–4, 6–4
Loss	3.	7 September 2013	Genoa, Italy	Clay	(Croatia) Mate Pavić	(Italy) Daniele Bracciali (Austria) Oliver Marach	3–6, 6–2, [9–11]
Win	9.	14 September 2013	Banja Luka, Bosnia and Herzegovina	Clay	(Croatia) Nikola Mektić	(Germany) Dominik Meffert (Ukraine) Oleksandr Nedovyesov	6–4, 3–6, [10–6]
Win	10.	21 September 2013	Trnava, Slovakia	Clay	(Croatia) Mate Pavić	(Slovenia) Aljaž Bedene (Czech Republic) Jaroslav Pospíšil	7–5, 4–6, [10–6]
Win	11.	3 November 2013	Seoul, South Korea	Hard	(Croatia) Mate Pavić	(Chinese Taipei) Lee Hsin-han (Chinese Taipei) Peng Hsien-yin	7–5, 6–2
Win	12.	10 November 2013	Yeongwol, South Korea	Hard	(Croatia) Mate Pavić	(Chinese Taipei) Lee Hsin-han (Chinese Taipei) Peng Hsien-yin	6–4, 4–6, [10–7]
Win	13.	20 April 2014	Sarasota, United States	Clay	(Finland) Henri Kontinen	(Spain) Rubén Ramírez Hidalgo (Croatia) Franko Škugor	5–7, 7–5, [10–6]
