= 2010 Open de Moselle – Doubles =

Doubles
- 2010 Open de Moselle

Final
- Champions: (Jamaica) Dustin Brown (Netherlands) Rogier Wassen
- Runners-up: (Brazil) Marcelo Melo (Brazil) Bruno Soares
- Score: 6–3, 6–3

Events
Singles	Doubles
← 2009 ·	Open de Moselle	· 2011 →

Colin Fleming and Ken Skupski were the defending champions, but they were eliminated by Wesley Moodie and Dick Norman in the quarterfinals.
Dustin Brown and Rogier Wassen defeated Marcelo Melo and Bruno Soares 6–3, 6–3 in the final.

== Seeds ==
1. (South Africa) Wesley Moodie / (Belgium) Dick Norman (semifinals)
2. (Brazil) Marcelo Melo / (Brazil) Bruno Soares (final)
3. (Germany) Michael Kohlmann / (Finland) Jarkko Nieminen (first round)
4. (Sweden) Johan Brunström / (Germany) Christopher Kas (first round)

== Draw ==
=== Key ===
- Q = Qualifier
- WC = Wild card
- LL = Lucky loser
- Alt = Alternate
- SE = Special exempt
- PR = Protected ranking
- ITF = ITF entry
- JE = Junior exempt
- w/o = Walkover
- r = Retired
- d = Defaulted
- SR = Special ranking

=== Draw ===
First round
1	(South Africa) W Moodie (Belgium) D Norman	6	6
(Israel) J Erlich (Uzbekistan) D Istomin	4	4
(France) A Clément (France) N Mahut	6^{7}	4
(United Kingdom) C Fleming (United Kingdom) K Skupski	7^{9}	6
3	(Finland) J Nieminen (Germany) M Kohlmann	1	6^{7}
(Australia) J Kerr (United States) T Parrott	6	7^{9}
ALT	(Jamaica) D Brown (Netherlands) R Wassen	5	7	[11]
(United Kingdom) R Hutchins (United States) S Lipsky	7	5	[9]
WC	(France) T Ascione (France) M Gicquel	6^{7}	6	[6]
(United States) E Butorac (Netherlands Antilles) J-J Rojer	7^{9}	3	[10]
(France) R Gasquet (France) É Roger-Vasselin	3	6	[10]
4	(Sweden) J Brunström (Germany) C Kas	6	1	[1]
(Australia) S Huss (Serbia) D Vemić	6^{4}	6	[6]
(Belgium) X Malisse (Belgium) K Vliegen	7^{7}	3	[10]
WC	(Hungary) M Fucsovics (France) P-H Herbert	6	1	[3]
2	(Brazil) M Melo (Brazil) B Soares	3	6	[10]

Quarterfinals
1	(South Africa) W Moodie (Belgium) D Norman	6	7
(United Kingdom) C Fleming (United Kingdom) K Skupski	2	5
(Australia) J Kerr (United States) T Parrott	4	6^{4}
ALT	(Jamaica) D Brown (Netherlands) R Wassen	6	7^{7}
(United States) E Butorac (Netherlands Antilles) J-J Rojer	4	6	[12]
(France) R Gasquet (France) É Roger-Vasselin	6	3	[14]
(Belgium) X Malisse (Belgium) K Vliegen	6^{3}	1
2	(Brazil) M Melo (Brazil) B Soares	7^{7}	6

Semifinals
1	(South Africa) W Moodie (Belgium) D Norman	6^{6}	3
ALT	(Jamaica) D Brown (Netherlands) R Wassen	7^{8}	6
(France) R Gasquet (France) É Roger-Vasselin
2	(Brazil) M Melo (Brazil) B Soares	w/o

Finals
ALT	(Jamaica) D Brown (Netherlands) R Wassen	6	6
2	(Brazil) M Melo (Brazil) B Soares	3	3
