= 2011 Open de Moselle – Singles =

Singles
- 2011 Open de Moselle

Final
- Champion: (France) Jo-Wilfried Tsonga
- Runner-up: (Croatia) Ivan Ljubičić
- Score: 6–3, 6–7^{(4–7)}, 6–3

Details
- Draw: 28
- Seeds: 8

Events
Singles	Doubles
← 2010 ·	Open de Moselle	· 2012 →

Gilles Simon was the defending champion, but chose not to compete this year.

Jo-Wilfried Tsonga won the title, defeating Ivan Ljubičić 6–3, 6–7^{(4–7)}, 6–3 in the final. It was his first title since October 2009, having failed to make a single ATP World Tour final in 2010.

== Seeds ==
1. (France) Jo-Wilfried Tsonga (champion)
2. (France) Richard Gasquet (quarterfinals)
3. (Ukraine) Alexandr Dolgopolov (semifinals)
4. (Croatia) Ivan Ljubičić (final)
5. (France) Michaël Llodra (first round)
6. (Belgium) Xavier Malisse (quarterfinals, retired)
7. (Germany) Philipp Kohlschreiber (second round)
8. (Luxembourg) Gilles Müller (semifinals)

== Draw ==
=== Key ===
- Q = Qualifier
- WC = Wild card
- LL = Lucky loser
- Alt = Alternate
- SE = Special exempt
- PR = Protected ranking
- ITF = ITF entry
- JE = Junior exempt
- w/o = Walkover
- r = Retired
- d = Defaulted
- SR = Special ranking

=== Finals ===
Semifinals
1	(France) Jo-Wilfried Tsonga	6	6
3	(Ukraine) Alexandr Dolgopolov	4	4
4	(Croatia) Ivan Ljubičić	7^{7}	7^{7}
8	(Luxembourg) Gilles Müller	6^{3}	6^{5}

Final
1	(France) Jo-Wilfried Tsonga	6	6^{4}	6
4	(Croatia) Ivan Ljubičić	3	7^{7}	3

=== Top half ===
First round
(Kazakhstan) M Kukushkin	2	6	4
Q	(France) M Rodrigues	6	3	6
(France) N Mahut	6	6
(Argentina) D Junqueira	3	2
WC	(France) A Clément	6	6
5	(France) M Llodra	3	4
(Germany) M Bachinger	5	2
(Cyprus) M Baghdatis	7	6
(Russia) I Kunitsyn	7	5	6
WC	(France) K de Schepper	5	7	4
(Germany) M Berrer	4	6	4
6	(Belgium) X Malisse	6	3	6

Second round
1	(France) J-W Tsonga	6	6
Q	(France) M Rodrigues	3	4
(France) N Mahut	3	7	6
WC	(France) A Clément	6	5	3
3	(Ukraine) A Dolgopolov	6^{5}	7	6
(Cyprus) M Baghdatis	7^{7}	5	3
(Russia) I Kunitsyn	4	2
6	(Belgium) X Malisse	6	6

Quarterfinals
1	(France) J-W Tsonga	4	6	7
(France) N Mahut	6	3	5
3	(Ukraine) A Dolgopolov	6	1
6	(Belgium) X Malisse	3	0	r

Semifinals
1	(France) J-W Tsonga	6	6
3	(Ukraine) A Dolgopolov	4	4

=== Bottom half ===
First round
7	(Germany) P Kohlschreiber	6	7^{7}
Q	(France) J Dasnières de Veigy	4	6^{4}
Q	(Netherlands) I Sijsling	6	6
(Bulgaria) G Dimitrov	2	2
(Germany) T Kamke	5	4
Q	(France) N Renavand	7	6
8	(Luxembourg) G Müller	7^{7}	7^{7}
(Germany) P Petzschner	6^{2}	6^{5}
WC	(France) B Paire	7	6
(Kazakhstan) A Golubev	5	2
(Belgium) O Rochus	6	6
(France) S Robert	1	3

Second round
7	(Germany) P Kohlschreiber	4	5
Q	(Netherlands) I Sijsling	6	7
Q	(France) N Renavand	5	5
4	(Croatia) I Ljubičić	7	7
8	(Luxembourg) G Müller	7^{7}	6
WC	(France) B Paire	6^{5}	4
(Belgium) O Rochus	2	1
2	(France) R Gasquet	6	6

Quarterfinals
Q	(Netherlands) I Sijsling	4	3
4	(Croatia) I Ljubičić	6	6
8	(Luxembourg) G Müller	6	6
2	(France) R Gasquet	3	4

Semifinals
4	(Croatia) I Ljubičić	7^{7}	7^{7}
8	(Luxembourg) G Müller	6^{3}	6^{5}
