= 2012 Moselle Open – Doubles =

Doubles
- 2012 Moselle Open

Final
- Champions: (France) Nicolas Mahut (France) Édouard Roger-Vasselin
- Runners-up: (Sweden) Johan Brunström (Denmark) Frederik Nielsen
- Score: 7–6^{(7–3)}, 6–4

Events
Singles	Doubles
← 2011 ·	Moselle Open	· 2013 →

Jamie Murray and André Sá were the defending champions, but lost in the first round to Xavier Malisse and Alexander Waske.
Nicolas Mahut and Édouard Roger-Vasselin defeated Johan Brunström and Frederik Nielsen in the final, 7–6^{(7–3)}, 6–4. It was Mahut and Roger-Vasselin's third ATP World Tour doubles title of the year.

== Seeds ==
1. (Croatia) Ivan Dodig / (Brazil) Marcelo Melo (first round)
2. (France) Nicolas Mahut / (France) Édouard Roger-Vasselin (champions)
3. (Germany) Dustin Brown / (Germany) Christopher Kas (semifinals)
4. (Sweden) Johan Brunström / (Denmark) Frederik Nielsen (final)

== Draw ==
=== Key ===
- Q = Qualifier
- WC = Wild card
- LL = Lucky loser
- Alt = Alternate
- SE = Special exempt
- PR = Protected ranking
- ITF = ITF entry
- JE = Junior exempt
- w/o = Walkover
- r = Retired
- d = Defaulted
- SR = Special ranking

=== Draw ===
First round
1	(Croatia) I Dodig (Brazil) M Melo	4	4
(United States) N Monroe (Germany) S Stadler	6	6
(Belgium) X Malisse (Germany) A Waske	7^{9}	6
(United Kingdom) J Murray (Brazil) A Sá	6^{7}	3
4	(Sweden) J Brunström (Denmark) F Nielsen	6	3	[10]
(Germany) M Berrer (Israel) J Erlich	4	6	[3]
(South Africa) R Klaasen (Belgium) D Norman	4	6^{4}
WC	(France) V Millot (France) G Monfils	6	7^{7}
(United States) E Butorac (Australia) J Peers	6	7^{7}
WC	(France) P-H Herbert (France) A Olivetti	4	6^{5}
(Italy) D Bracciali (Italy) A Seppi	3	4
3	(Germany) D Brown (Germany) C Kas	6	6
(Czech Republic) L Dlouhý (Australia) J Kerr	3	5
(Germany) D Brands (United States) J Levine	6	7
(France) B Paire (France) J-W Tsonga	3	5
2	(France) N Mahut (France) É Roger-Vasselin	6	7

Quarterfinals
(United States) N Monroe (Germany) S Stadler	0	3
(Belgium) X Malisse (Germany) A Waske	6	6
4	(Sweden) J Brunström (Denmark) F Nielsen	w/o
WC	(France) V Millot (France) G Monfils
(United States) E Butorac (Australia) J Peers	6^{5}	4
3	(Germany) D Brown (Germany) C Kas	7^{7}	6
(Germany) D Brands (United States) J Levine	6	3	[7]
2	(France) N Mahut (France) É Roger-Vasselin	3	6	[10]

Semifinals
(Belgium) X Malisse (Germany) A Waske	6^{5}	6^{5}
4	(Sweden) J Brunström (Denmark) F Nielsen	7^{7}	7^{7}
3	(Germany) D Brown (Germany) C Kas	4	2
2	(France) N Mahut (France) É Roger-Vasselin	6	6

Final
4	(Sweden) J Brunström (Denmark) F Nielsen	6^{3}	4
2	(France) N Mahut (France) É Roger-Vasselin	7^{7}	6
