= 2012 Moselle Open – Singles =

Singles
- 2012 Moselle Open

Final
- Champion: (France) Jo-Wilfried Tsonga
- Runner-up: (Italy) Andreas Seppi
- Score: 6–1, 6–2

Details
- Draw: 28
- Seeds: 8

Events
Singles	Doubles
← 2011 ·	Moselle Open	· 2013 →

Jo-Wilfried Tsonga successfully defended his title, defeating Andreas Seppi in the final, 6–1, 6–2.

== Seeds ==
The top four seeds receive a bye into the second round.

1. (France) Jo-Wilfried Tsonga (champion)
2. (Germany) Philipp Kohlschreiber (quarterfinals)
3. (Spain) Marcel Granollers (second round, retired)
4. (Germany) Florian Mayer (quarterfinals)
5. (Italy) Andreas Seppi (final)
6. (Finland) Jarkko Nieminen (withdrew because of a right thigh injury)
7. (France) Gaël Monfils (semifinals)
8. (Russia) Nikolay Davydenko (semifinals)

== Draw ==
=== Key ===
- Q = Qualifier
- WC = Wild card
- LL = Lucky loser
- Alt = Alternate
- SE = Special exempt
- PR = Protected ranking
- ITF = ITF entry
- JE = Junior exempt
- w/o = Walkover
- r = Retired
- d = Defaulted
- SR = Special ranking

=== Finals ===
Semifinals
1	(France) Jo-Wilfried Tsonga	6	3	6
8/WC	(Russia) Nikolay Davydenko	0	6	4
5	(Italy) Andreas Seppi	3	6	6
7	(France) Gaël Monfils	6	1	4

Final
1	(France) Jo-Wilfried Tsonga	6	6
5	(Italy) Andreas Seppi	1	2

=== Top half ===
First round
(France) É Roger-Vasselin	3	6	5
Q	(France) C Reix	6	3	7
(Germany) C-M Stebe	3	2
(United States) J Levine	6	6
(Czech Republic) J Hájek	4	0^{r}
LL	(Germany) M Berrer	6	2
(Croatia) I Karlović	7^{7}	7^{7}
Q	(France) K de Schepper	6^{5}	6^{3}
WC	(France) P-H Mathieu	6^{5}	4
(Luxembourg) G Müller	7^{7}	6
Q	(Germany) M Zverev	6	3	3
8/WC	(Russia) N Davydenko	2	6	6

Second round
1	(France) J-W Tsonga	6	6
Q	(France) C Reix	3	3
(United States) J Levine	6	3	6
LL	(Germany) M Berrer	4	6	0
3	(Spain) M Granollers	6^{3}	2^{r}
(Croatia) I Karlović	7^{7}	2
(Luxembourg) G Müller	5	4
8/WC	(Russia) N Davydenko	7	6

Quarterfinals
1	(France) J-W Tsonga	6	6
(United States) J Levine	3	4
(Croatia) I Karlović	7^{7}	6^{6}	0
8/WC	(Russia) N Davydenko	6^{5}	7^{8}	6

Semifinals
1	(France) J-W Tsonga	6	3	6
8/WC	(Russia) N Davydenko	0	6	4

=== Bottom half ===
First round
5	(Italy) A Seppi	6^{7}	6	6
(Croatia) I Dodig	7^{9}	3	4
(Netherlands) I Sijsling	4	4
Q	(France) V Millot	6	6
WC	(France) A Olivetti	2	6^{4}
(United States) J Blake	6	7^{7}
7	(France) G Monfils	6	6
(Belgium) O Rochus	3	2
(France) N Mahut	7^{10}	7^{7}
LL	(Germany) D Brands	6^{8}	6^{4}
(Belgium) X Malisse	1	4
(France) B Paire	6	6

Second round
5	(Italy) A Seppi	6	6
Q	(France) V Millot	2	1
(United States) J Blake	7^{7}	3	4
4	(Germany) F Mayer	6^{4}	6	6
7	(France) G Monfils	7^{7}	7
(France) N Mahut	6^{4}	5
(France) B Paire	2	6	1
2	(Germany) P Kohlschreiber	6	1	6

Quarterfinals
5	(Italy) A Seppi	7	6
4	(Germany) F Mayer	5	2
7	(France) G Monfils	6^{3}	6	6
2	(Germany) P Kohlschreiber	7^{7}	4	4

Semifinals
5	(Italy) A Seppi	3	6	6
7	(France) G Monfils	6	1	4

== Qualifying ==
=== Seeds ===
1. (Germany) Daniel Brands (qualifying competition, lucky loser)
2. (Germany) Michael Berrer (qualifying competition, lucky loser)
3. (France) Josselin Ouanna (qualifying competition)
4. (Germany) Dustin Brown (second round)
5. (Czech Republic) Jan Hernych (second round)
6. (Belgium) Maxime Authom (qualifying competition)
7. (Germany) Mischa Zverev (qualified)
8. (United States) Alex Kuznetsov (first round)

=== Qualifiers ===
1. (France) Vincent Millot
2. (Germany) Mischa Zverev
3. (France) Kenny de Schepper
4. (France) Clément Reix

=== Lucky losers ===
1. (Germany) Michael Berrer
2. (Germany) Daniel Brands

=== Draw ===
==== First qualifier ====
First round
1	(Germany) Daniel Brands	6	6
WC	(France) Ugo Nastasi	3	4
(France) Sébastien Boltz	2	5
(France) Pierre-Hugues Herbert	6	7
(France) Vincent Millot	7^{8}	6
(France) Nicolas Renavand	6^{6}	1
(Denmark) Frederik Nielsen	3	6^{2}
5	(Czech Republic) Jan Hernych	6	7^{7}

Second round
1	(Germany) Daniel Brands	7^{7}	7
(France) Pierre-Hugues Herbert	6^{5}	5
(France) Vincent Millot	6	7
5	(Czech Republic) Jan Hernych	4	5

Qualifying competition
1	(Germany) Daniel Brands	2	3
(France) Vincent Millot	6	6

==== Second qualifier ====
First round
2	(Germany) Michael Berrer	6	6
(France) Jonathan Eysseric	2	2
WC	(Russia) Philip Davydenko	6	6
WC	(France) Emmanuel Greff	1	4
(France) Mathieu Rodrigues	3	6	4
(France) Romain Jouan	6	4	6
(Germany) David Thurner	2	2
7	(Germany) Mischa Zverev	6	6

Second round
2	(Germany) Michael Berrer	6	6
WC	(Russia) Philip Davydenko	3	1
(France) Romain Jouan	1	1
7	(Germany) Mischa Zverev	6	6

Qualifying competition
2	(Germany) Michael Berrer	3	3
7	(Germany) Mischa Zverev	6	6

==== Third qualifier ====
First round
3	(France) Josselin Ouanna	1	6	6
(France) Laurent Malouli	6	3	2
(Germany) Denis Gremelmayr	0	0^{r}
(France) Alexandre Penaud	6	3
(Germany) Richard Waite	4	2
(France) Kenny de Schepper	6	6
(Lithuania) Laurynas Grigelis	6	2	6
8	(United States) Alex Kuznetsov	4	6	4

Second round
3	(France) Josselin Ouanna	6	6
(France) Alexandre Penaud	2	2
(France) Kenny de Schepper	7	6
(Lithuania) Laurynas Grigelis	5	0

Qualifying competition
3	(France) Josselin Ouanna	4	6^{5}
(France) Kenny de Schepper	6	7^{7}

==== Fourth qualifier ====
First round
4	(Germany) Dustin Brown	6	6
(France) Gleb Sakharov	4	4
WC	(France) Tristan Gabriel	2	3
(France) Clément Reix	6	6
WC	(France) Jean-Pascal Vernet	2	1
(Czech Republic) Jan Minář	6	6
WC	(France) Hugo Schott	3	3
6	(Belgium) Maxime Authom	6	6

Second round
4	(Germany) Dustin Brown	6	3	5
(France) Clément Reix	4	6	7
(Czech Republic) Jan Minář	4	7^{11}	6^{3}
6	(Belgium) Maxime Authom	6	6^{9}	7^{7}

Qualifying competition
(France) Clément Reix	6	7^{7}
6	(Belgium) Maxime Authom	3	6^{5}
