= 2011 Open de Moselle – Doubles =

Doubles
- 2011 Open de Moselle

Final
- Champions: (United Kingdom) Jamie Murray (Brazil) André Sá
- Runners-up: (Czech Republic) Lukáš Dlouhý (Brazil) Marcelo Melo
- Score: 6–4, 7–6^{(9–7)}

Events
| Singles | Doubles |
| ← 2010 · | Open de Moselle | · 2012 → |

Dustin Brown and Rogier Wassen were the defending champions, but decided not to participate.
Jamie Murray and André Sá won the title, defeating Lukáš Dlouhý and Marcelo Melo 6–4, 7–6^{(9–7)} in the final.

== Seeds ==
1. (Germany) Christopher Kas / (Austria) Alexander Peya (quarterfinals)
2. (Czech Republic) Lukáš Dlouhý / (Brazil) Marcelo Melo (final)
3. (Australia) Paul Hanley / (Belgium) Dick Norman (first round)
4. (United Kingdom) Colin Fleming / (United Kingdom) Ross Hutchins (semifinals)

== Draw ==
=== Key ===
- Q = Qualifier
- WC = Wild card
- LL = Lucky loser
- Alt = Alternate
- SE = Special exempt
- PR = Protected ranking
- ITF = ITF entry
- JE = Junior exempt
- w/o = Walkover
- r = Retired
- d = Defaulted
- SR = Special ranking

=== Draw ===
First round
1 | (Germany) C Kas (Austria) A Peya | 7^{7} | 7^{7}
(Argentina) D Junqueira (France) S Robert | 6^{2} | 6^{4}
WC | (France) K de Schepper (France) A Clément | 6 | 4 | [10]
(United Kingdom) J Delgado (United Kingdom) J Marray | 3 | 6 | [7]
3 | (Australia) P Hanley (Belgium) D Norman | 6^{4} | 6^{5}
WC | (France) P-H Herbert (France) N Renavand | 7^{7} | 7^{7}
(Belgium) O Rochus (Germany) M Zverev | 3 | 2
(United Kingdom) J Murray (Brazil) A Sá | 6 | 6
(Kazakhstan) M Kukushkin (Germany) F Moser | 2 | 3
(Canada) A Shamasdin (Slovakia) I Zelenay | 6 | 6
(Germany) M Bachinger (Germany) T Kamke
4 | (United Kingdom) C Fleming (United Kingdom) R Hutchins | w/o
(United States) J Cerretani (Germany) P Marx | 3 | 5
(Germany) M Kohlmann (Germany) A Waske | 6 | 7
(Croatia) I Ljubičić (Croatia) L Zovko | 3 | 4
2 | (Czech Republic) L Dlouhý (Brazil) M Melo | 6 | 6

Quarterfinals
1 | (Germany) C Kas (Austria) A Peya | 1 | 6^{3}
WC | (France) K de Schepper (France) A Clément | 6 | 7^{7}
WC | (France) P-H Herbert (France) N Renavand | 6 | 3 | [5]
(United Kingdom) J Murray (Brazil) A Sá | 3 | 6 | [10]
(Canada) A Shamasdin (Slovakia) I Zelenay | 4 | 5
4 | (United Kingdom) C Fleming (United Kingdom) R Hutchins | 6 | 7
(Germany) M Kohlmann (Germany) A Waske | 6^{5} | 4
2 | (Czech Republic) L Dlouhý (Brazil) M Melo | 7^{7} | 6

Semifinals
WC | (France) K de Schepper (France) A Clément | 4 | 3
(United Kingdom) J Murray (Brazil) A Sá | 6 | 6
4 | (United Kingdom) C Fleming (United Kingdom) R Hutchins | 6 | 4 | [6]
2 | (Czech Republic) L Dlouhý (Brazil) M Melo | 1 | 6 | [10]

Final
(United Kingdom) J Murray (Brazil) A Sá | 6 | 7^{9}
2 | (Czech Republic) L Dlouhý (Brazil) M Melo | 4 | 6^{7}
