= 2010 Open de Moselle – Singles =

Singles
- 2010 Open de Moselle

Final
- Champion: (France) Gilles Simon
- Runner-up: (Germany) Mischa Zverev
- Score: 6–3, 6–2

Details
- Draw: 28
- Seeds: 16

Events
Singles	Doubles
← 2009 ·	Open de Moselle	· 2011 →

Gaël Monfils was the defending champion, but he withdrew before his match against German qualifier Mischa Zverev.
Gilles Simon won the title, by defeating Zverev in the final, 6–3, 6–2.

== Seeds ==
The first four seeds received a bye to the first round.

1. (Croatia) Marin Čilić (quarterfinals)
2. (France) ~~Gaël Monfils~~ (withdrew)
3. (Croatia) Ivan Ljubičić (second round)
4. (France) Richard Gasquet (semifinals, withdrew due to a fever)
5. (France) ~~Michaël Llodra~~ (withdrew)
6. (Germany) Philipp Kohlschreiber (semifinals)
7. (Spain) Tommy Robredo (quarterfinals)
8. (France) Gilles Simon (champion)

== Main draw ==
=== Key ===
- Q = Qualifier
- WC = Wild card
- LL = Lucky loser
- Alt = Alternate
- SE = Special exempt
- PR = Protected ranking
- ITF = ITF entry
- JE = Junior exempt
- w/o = Walkover
- r = Retired
- d = Defaulted
- SR = Special ranking

=== Finals ===
Semifinals
6	(Germany) Philipp Kohlschreiber	3	2
8	(France) Gilles Simon	6	6
4	(France) Richard Gasquet
Q	(Germany) Mischa Zverev	w/o

Final
8	(France) Gilles Simon	6	6
Q	(Germany) Mischa Zverev	3	2

=== Top half ===
First round
(Slovakia) L Lacko	6	6
(France) A Clément	4	2
(Germany) M Berrer	7^{7}	6
(Germany) R Schüttler	6^{5}	2
Q	(Italy) T Fabbiano	4	3
6	(Germany) P Kohlschreiber	6	6
Q	(France) É Roger-Vasselin	6^{3}	4
(Belgium) X Malisse	7^{7}	6
Q	(Netherlands) I Sijsling	6	6
WC	(France) T Ascione	4	4
(Jamaica) D Brown	3	4
8	(France) G Simon	6	6

Second round
1/WC	(Croatia) M Čilić	7	7^{7}
(Slovakia) L Lacko	5	6^{5}
(Germany) M Berrer	4	2
6	(Germany) P Kohlschreiber	6	6
3	(Croatia) I Ljubičić	5	2
(Belgium) X Malisse	7	6
Q	(Netherlands) I Sijsling	1	7^{7}	3
8	(France) G Simon	6	6^{5}	6

Quarterfinals
1/WC	(Croatia) M Čilić	4	1
6	(Germany) P Kohlschreiber	6	6
(Belgium) X Malisse	5	6	1
8	(France) G Simon	7	4	6

Semifinals
6	(Germany) P Kohlschreiber	3	2
8	(France) G Simon	6	6

=== Bottom half ===
First round
7	(Spain) T Robredo	6	7^{7}
(Germany) D Brands	1	6^{3}
(Uzbekistan) D Istomin	6	6
(France) F Serra	4	4
WC	(France) A Mannarino	3	3
(France) P-H Mathieu	6	6
LL	(Argentina) F Delbonis	2	6	3
PR	(Belgium) K Vliegen	6	4	6
(Finland) J Nieminen	6	7^{7}
(Germany) B Becker	3	6^{2}
Q	(Germany) M Zverev	6	6
(Argentina) H Zeballos	3	2

Second round
7	(Spain) T Robredo	6	6
(Uzbekistan) D Istomin	4	2
(France) P-H Mathieu	6	6^{5}	6^{3}
4	(France) R Gasquet	4	7^{7}	7^{7}
PR	(Belgium) K Vliegen	4	1
(Finland) J Nieminen	6	6
Q	(Germany) M Zverev	6	6
LL	(France) N Mahut	4	2

Quarterfinals
7	(Spain) T Robredo	6^{3}	6^{5}
4	(France) R Gasquet	7^{7}	7^{7}
(Finland) J Nieminen	6^{0}	3
Q	(Germany) M Zverev	7^{7}	6

Semifinals
4	(France) R Gasquet
Q	(Germany) M Zverev	w/o
