= 2013 Moselle Open – Doubles =

Doubles
- 2013 Moselle Open

Final
- Champions: (Sweden) Johan Brunström (South Africa) Raven Klaasen
- Runners-up: (France) Nicolas Mahut (France) Jo-Wilfried Tsonga
- Score: 6–4, 7–6^{(7–5)}

Events
| Singles | Doubles |
| ← 2012 · | Moselle Open | · 2014 → |

Nicolas Mahut and Édouard Roger-Vasselin were the defending champions, but chose not to participate together. Roger-Vasselin teamed up with Rohan Bopanna, but lost in the semifinals to Johan Brunström and Raven Klaasen.
Mahut played alongside Jo-Wilfried Tsonga, but lost in the final to Brunström and Klaasen, 4–6, 6–7^{(5–7)}.

== Seeds ==
1. (India) Rohan Bopanna / (France) Édouard Roger-Vasselin (semifinals)
2. (Austria) Julian Knowle / (Brazil) Marcelo Melo (quarterfinals)
3. (United Kingdom) Jamie Murray / (Australia) John Peers (first round)
4. (Germany) Andre Begemann / (Germany) Martin Emmrich (quarterfinals)

== Draw ==
=== Key ===
- Q = Qualifier
- WC = Wild card
- LL = Lucky loser
- Alt = Alternate
- SE = Special exempt
- PR = Protected ranking
- ITF = ITF entry
- JE = Junior exempt
- w/o = Walkover
- r = Retired
- d = Defaulted
- SR = Special ranking

=== Draw ===
First round
1 | (India) R Bopanna (France) É Roger-Vasselin | 6 | 7^{7}
(United States) E Butorac (United States) S Querrey | 1 | 6^{4}
(United States) N Monroe (Germany) S Stadler | 2 | 6 | [10]
(Germany) C Kas (Italy) A Seppi | 6 | 2 | [5]
3 | (United Kingdom) J Murray (Australia) J Peers | 4 | 6^{2}
(Sweden) J Brunström (South Africa) R Klaasen | 6 | 7^{7}
PR | (Israel) J Erlich (Israel) A Ram | 4 | 6 | [10]
WC | (France) P-H Herbert (France) A Olivetti | 6 | 4 | [4]
(France) N Mahut (France) J-W Tsonga | 6 | 6
(Argentina) C Berlocq (Netherlands) I Sijsling | 4 | 1
(Poland) T Bednarek (Austria) O Marach | 6^{3} | 4
4 | (Germany) A Begemann (Germany) M Emmrich | 7^{7} | 6
(Argentina) F Delbonis (Brazil) M Demoliner | 3 | 4
(Australia) P Hanley (Brazil) A Sá | 6 | 6
WC | (France) J Chardy (France) M Gicquel | 4 | 3
2 | (Austria) J Knowle (Brazil) M Melo | 6 | 6

Quarterfinals
1 | (India) R Bopanna (France) É Roger-Vasselin | 6 | 6
(United States) N Monroe (Germany) S Stadler | 3 | 2
(Sweden) J Brunström (South Africa) R Klaasen | 6 | 6
PR | (Israel) J Erlich (Israel) A Ram | 4 | 4
(France) N Mahut (France) J-W Tsonga | 7^{13} | 7
4 | (Germany) A Begemann (Germany) M Emmrich | 6^{11} | 5
(Australia) P Hanley (Brazil) A Sá | 6 | 6
2 | (Austria) J Knowle (Brazil) M Melo | 3 | 2

Semifinals
1 | (India) R Bopanna (France) É Roger-Vasselin | 4 | 7^{10} | [6]
(Sweden) J Brunström (South Africa) R Klaasen | 6 | 6^{8} | [10]
(France) N Mahut (France) J-W Tsonga | 6 | 6^{2} | [10]
(Australia) P Hanley (Brazil) A Sá | 2 | 7^{7} | [4]

Final
(Sweden) J Brunström (South Africa) R Klaasen | 6 | 7^{7}
(France) N Mahut (France) J-W Tsonga | 4 | 6^{5}
