= 2013 Moselle Open – Singles =

Singles
- 2013 Moselle Open

Final
- Champion: (France) Gilles Simon
- Runner-up: (France) Jo-Wilfried Tsonga
- Score: 6–4, 6–3

Details
- Draw: 28
- Seeds: 8

Events
Singles	Doubles
← 2012 ·	Moselle Open	· 2014 →

Jo-Wilfried Tsonga was the two-time defending champion but lost in the final to Gilles Simon, 4–6, 3–6.

== Seeds ==
The top four seeds receive a bye into the second round.

1. (France) Jo-Wilfried Tsonga (final)
2. (France) Gilles Simon (champion)
3. (Italy) Andreas Seppi (second round)
4. (Germany) Philipp Kohlschreiber (second round, retired)
5. (France) Benoît Paire (first round)
6. (United States) Sam Querrey (quarterfinals)
7. (France) Jérémy Chardy (first round)
8. (Germany) Florian Mayer (semifinals)

== Draw ==
=== Key ===
- Q = Qualifier
- WC = Wild card
- LL = Lucky loser
- Alt = Alternate
- SE = Special exempt
- PR = Protected ranking
- ITF = ITF entry
- JE = Junior exempt
- w/o = Walkover
- r = Retired
- d = Defaulted
- SR = Special ranking

=== Finals ===
Semifinals
1	(France) Jo-Wilfried Tsonga	4	6	6
8	(Germany) Florian Mayer	6	2	3
(France) Nicolas Mahut	3	6^{2}
2/WC	(France) Gilles Simon	6	7^{7}

Final
1	(France) Jo-Wilfried Tsonga	4	3
2/WC	(France) Gilles Simon	6	6

=== Top half ===
First round
(Argentina) F Delbonis	0	2
(France) É Roger-Vasselin	6	6
(Germany) T Kamke	6	6
Q	(France) M Gicquel	2	3
Q	(Hungary) M Fucsovics	6	7^{7}
7	(France) J Chardy	3	6^{5}
(Argentina) C Berlocq	6	6
(Czech Republic) J Veselý	3	4
LL	(Germany) M Berrer	3	6	2
(Slovakia) L Lacko	6	1	6
Q	(France) P-H Herbert	2	5
8	(Germany) F Mayer	6	7

Second round
1	(France) J-W Tsonga	6	6
(France) É Roger-Vasselin	3	4
(Germany) T Kamke	1	6	6
Q	(Hungary) M Fucsovics	6	3	2
4	(Germany) P Kohlschreiber	7^{9}	6^{5}	1^{r}
(Argentina) C Berlocq	6^{7}	7^{7}	2
(Slovakia) L Lacko	3	2
8	(Germany) F Mayer	6	6

Quarterfinals
1	(France) J-W Tsonga	4	6	6
(Germany) T Kamke	6	3	4
(Argentina) C Berlocq	7	4	5
8	(Germany) F Mayer	5	6	7

Semifinals
1	(France) J-W Tsonga	4	6	6
8	(Germany) F Mayer	6	2	3

=== Bottom half ===
First round
5	(France) B Paire	3	5
(Germany) B Becker	6	7
Q	(Germany) M Zverev	5	6^{3}
WC	(France) A Olivetti	7	7^{7}
(France) N Mahut	7^{7}	6
(Argentina) L Mayer	6^{4}	4
6	(United States) S Querrey	4	7^{7}	6
(Croatia) I Karlović	6	6^{4}	4
(Netherlands) I Sijsling	7^{7}	5	6^{6}
WC	(France) P-H Mathieu	6^{4}	7	7^{8}
(France) K de Schepper	6	6
(Netherlands) J Huta Galung	3	2

Second round
(Germany) B Becker	6^{8}	6	6
WC	(France) A Olivetti	7^{10}	3	1
(France) N Mahut	6	6
3	(Italy) A Seppi	4	4
6	(United States) S Querrey	6	0
WC	(France) P-H Mathieu	2	0^{r}
(France) K de Schepper	2	3
2/WC	(France) G Simon	6	6

Quarterfinals
(Germany) B Becker	2	4
(France) N Mahut	6	6
6	(United States) S Querrey	4	6^{1}
2/WC	(France) G Simon	6	7^{7}

Semifinals
(France) N Mahut	3	6^{2}
2/WC	(France) G Simon	6	7^{7}

== Qualifying ==
=== Seeds ===
All seeds, along with two other players, received byes into the second round.

1. (France) Marc Gicquel (qualified)
2. (Germany) Mischa Zverev (qualified)
3. (Germany) Michael Berrer (qualifying competition, lucky loser)
4. (France) Pierre-Hugues Herbert (qualified)
5. (Hungary) Márton Fucsovics (qualified)
6. (Slovakia) Karol Beck (second round)
7. (France) Vincent Millot (qualifying competition)
8. (France) Nicolas Renavand (second round)

=== Qualifiers ===
1. (France) Marc Gicquel
2. (Germany) Mischa Zverev
3. (Hungary) Márton Fucsovics
4. (France) Pierre-Hugues Herbert

=== Lucky losers ===
1. (Germany) Michael Berrer

=== Qualifying draw ===
==== First qualifier ====
First round				Second round					Qualifying competition
				1	(France) Marc Gicquel	3	6	7
(Germany) Pascal Meis		5	0		(Czech Republic) Ivo Minář	6	4	5
(Czech Republic) Ivo Minář		7	6						1	(France) Marc Gicquel	6	6
	(Germany) Simon Stadler	w/o								(Germany) Simon Stadler	3	4
WC	(France) Emmanuel Greff				(Germany) Simon Stadler	6	6
				8	(France) Nicolas Renavand	1	4

==== Second qualifier ====
Second round
2	(Germany) Mischa Zverev	7	3	6
(Croatia) Filip Veger	5	6	1
WC	(Germany) Sascha Meis	1	0
7	(France) Vincent Millot	6	6

Qualifying competition
2	(Germany) Mischa Zverev	6	6^{1}	6
7	(France) Vincent Millot	3	7^{7}	4

==== Third qualifier ====
First round			Second round					Qualifying competition
			3	(Germany) Michael Berrer	6	7^{7}
(Australia) Paul Hanley	4	4		(United States) Nicholas Monroe	3	6^{3}
(United States) Nicholas Monroe	6	6						3	(Germany) Michael Berrer	1	6^{1}
(Germany) Christopher Kas	3	2						5	(Hungary) Márton Fucsovics	6	7^{7}
(Switzerland) Yann Marti	6	6		(Switzerland) Yann Marti	7^{7}	5	4
			5	(Hungary) Márton Fucsovics	6^{3}	7	6

==== Fourth qualifier ====
First round				Second round					Qualifying competition
				4	(France) Pierre-Hugues Herbert	4	7^{7}	6
WC	(France) Hugo Perrin	2	4	WC	(Brazil) André Sá	6	6^{4}	1
WC	(Brazil) André Sá	6	6						4	(France) Pierre-Hugues Herbert	2	6	6
(Brazil) Marcelo Demoliner		2	4							(Germany) Alexander Zverev	6	4	3
(Germany) Alexander Zverev		6	6		(Germany) Alexander Zverev	6	7^{7}
				6	(Slovakia) Karol Beck	3	6^{2}
