= 2009 Open de Moselle – Singles =

Singles
- 2009 Open de Moselle

Final
- Champion: (France) Gaël Monfils
- Runner-up: (Germany) Philipp Kohlschreiber
- Score: 7–6^{(7–1)}, 3–6, 6–2

Details
- Draw: 28
- Seeds: 8

Events
Singles	Doubles
← 2008 ·	Open de Moselle	· 2010 →

Dmitry Tursunov was the defending champion, but chose not to participate that year.
Gaël Monfils won in the final 7–6^{(7–1)}, 3–6, 6–2 against Philipp Kohlschreiber.

== Seeds ==
1. (France) Gaël Monfils (champion)
2. (Germany) Philipp Kohlschreiber (final)
3. (France) Paul-Henri Mathieu (semifinals)
4. (Germany) Philipp Petzschner (quarterfinals)
5. (France) Fabrice Santoro (first round)
6. (Germany) Benjamin Becker (first round)
7. (Germany) Andreas Beck (quarterfinals)
8. (Croatia) Ivan Ljubičić (second round)

== Draw ==
=== Key ===
- Q = Qualifier
- WC = Wild card
- LL = Lucky loser
- Alt = Alternate
- SE = Special exempt
- PR = Protected ranking
- ITF = ITF entry
- JE = Junior exempt
- w/o = Walkover
- r = Retired
- d = Defaulted
- SR = Special ranking

=== Finals ===
Semifinals
1	(France) Gaël Monfils	6	6
(France) Richard Gasquet	4	3
3	(France) Paul-Henri Mathieu	6^{5}	4
2	(Germany) Philipp Kohlschreiber	7^{7}	6

Final
1	(France) Gaël Monfils	7^{7}	3	6
2	(Germany) Philipp Kohlschreiber	6^{1}	6	2

=== Top half ===
First round
WC	(France) S Grosjean	7^{7}	7
LL	(France) N Mahut	6^{1}	5
(Serbia) J Tipsarević	6	6
LL	(France) A Clément	4	4
Q	(France) S de Chaunac	6	1	6^{1}
8	(Croatia) I Ljubičić	4	6	7^{7}
(Germany) M Zverev	6	3	3
WC	(France) M Llodra	4	6	6
(France) R Gasquet	6	2	7^{7}
Q	(Germany) M Berrer	3	6	6^{5}
(Belgium) C Rochus	0	6	7^{7}
5	(France) F Santoro	6	4	6^{3}

Second round
1	(France) G Monfils	6	6
WC	(France) S Grosjean	1	1
(Serbia) J Tipsarević	6	7^{7}
8	(Croatia) I Ljubičić	4	6^{3}
4	(Germany) P Petzschner	7^{7}	6
WC	(France) M Llodra	6^{3}	3
(France) R Gasquet	7	4	6
(Belgium) C Rochus	5	6	2

Quarterfinals
1	(France) G Monfils	6	4
(Serbia) J Tipsarević	1	2^{r}
4	(Germany) P Petzschner	7^{7}	1	3
(France) R Gasquet	6^{2}	6	6

Semifinals
1	(France) G Monfils	6	6
(France) R Gasquet	4	3

=== Bottom half ===
First round
7	(Germany) A Beck	6	6
(Chinese Taipei) Y-h Lu	4	2
(France) A Mannarino	6^{5}	4
Q	(France) T Ascione	7^{7}	6
(France) M Gicquel	6	6
Q	(Switzerland) R Valent	3	1
6	(Germany) B Becker	2	3
(Russia) E Korolev	6	6
(Uzbekistan) D Istomin	6	6
(Kazakhstan) A Golubev	2	4
(Germany) B Phau	7^{7}	7^{7}
(Germany) R Schüttler	6^{1}	6^{5}

Second round
7	(Germany) A Beck	6	6
Q	(France) T Ascione	2	4
(France) M Gicquel	6^{5}	4
3	(France) P-H Mathieu	7^{7}	6
(Russia) E Korolev	3	7	7^{7}
(Uzbekistan) D Istomin	6	5	6^{2}
(Germany) B Phau	6	3	2
2	(Germany) P Kohlschreiber	4	6	6

Quarterfinals
7	(Germany) A Beck	2	6	3
3	(France) P-H Mathieu	6	3	6
(Russia) E Korolev	1	3
2	(Germany) P Kohlschreiber	6	6

Semifinals
3	(France) P-H Mathieu	6^{5}	4
2	(Germany) P Kohlschreiber	7^{7}	6
