= 2008 Open de Moselle – Singles =

Singles
- 2008 Open de Moselle

Final
- Champion: (Russia) Dmitry Tursunov
- Runner-up: (France) Paul-Henri Mathieu
- Score: 7–6^{(8–6)}, 1–6, 6–4

Details
- Draw: 32
- Seeds: 8

Events
Singles	Doubles
← 2007 ·	Open de Moselle	· 2009 →

Tommy Robredo was the defending champion, but chose not to participate that year.

Dmitry Tursunov won in the final 7–6^{(8–6)}, 1–6, 6–4, against Paul-Henri Mathieu.

== Seeds ==
1. (Croatia) Ivo Karlović (second round)
2. (France) Gilles Simon (first round)
3. (Spain) Nicolás Almagro (first round)
4. (France) Paul-Henri Mathieu (final)
5. (Russia) Dmitry Tursunov (champion)
6. (Italy) Andreas Seppi (first round)
7. (Czech Republic) Radek Štěpánek (semifinals)
8. (Croatia) Mario Ančić (first round)

== Draw ==
=== Key ===
- Q = Qualifier
- WC = Wild card
- LL = Lucky loser
- Alt = Alternate
- SE = Special exempt
- PR = Protected ranking
- ITF = ITF entry
- JE = Junior exempt
- w/o = Walkover
- r = Retired
- d = Defaulted
- SR = Special ranking

=== Finals ===
Semifinals
5	(Russia) Dmitry Tursunov	6	6
7	(Czech Republic) Radek Štěpánek	3	4
4	(France) Paul-Henri Mathieu	7^{10}	7^{7}
Q	(France) Adrian Mannarino	6^{8}	6^{1}

Final
5	(Russia) Dmitry Tursunov	7^{8}	1	6
4	(France) Paul-Henri Mathieu	6^{6}	6	4

=== Top half ===
First round
1	(Croatia) I Karlović	4	2
(Cyprus) M Baghdatis	6	1^{r}
(Spain) Montañés	1	6	4
(Spain) C Moyá	6	4	6
(Argentina) J Acasuso	6	2	6
(Argentina) G Cañas	3	6	3
Q	(France) T Ascione	7^{7}	2	4
5	(Russia) D Tursunov	6^{3}	6	6
3	(Spain) N Almagro	6^{5}	2
(Argentina) E Schwank	7^{7}	6
(Romania) V Hănescu	6	7^{7}
(Croatia) I Ljubičić	1	6^{4}
(France) M Llodra	7^{13}	6^{6}	6
(Spain) F López	6^{11}	7^{8}	3
(France) J Benneteau	3	3
7	(Czech Republic) R Štěpánek	6	6

Second round
1	(Croatia) I Karlović	3	6^{4}
(Spain) C Moyá	6	7^{7}
(Argentina) J Acasuso	2	2
5	(Russia) D Tursunov	6	6
(Argentina) E Schwank	7^{8}	6^{5}	6
(Romania) V Hănescu	6^{6}	7^{7}	3
(France) M Llodra	7^{7}	1	6^{0}
7	(Czech Republic) R Štěpánek	6^{5}	6	7^{7}

Quarterfinals
(Spain) C Moyá	3	3
5	(Russia) D Tursunov	6	6
(Argentina) E Schwank	6	6^{4}	4
7	(Czech Republic) R Štěpánek	3	7^{7}	6

Semifinals
5	(Russia) D Tursunov	6	6
7	(Czech Republic) R Štěpánek	3	4

=== Bottom half ===
First round
8	(Croatia) M Ančić	6^{3}	4
(Latvia) E Gulbis	7^{7}	6
(Serbia) J Tipsarević	7^{7}	7
WC	(France) J Chardy	6^{5}	5
Q	(France) R Jouan	5	6	6
(Argentina) A Calleri	7	1	2
(France) N Devilder	0	2
4	(France) P-H Mathieu	6	6
6	(Italy) A Seppi	4	2
Q	(France) A Mannarino	6	6
Q	(South Africa) R de Voest	4	6	7
WC	(France) A Clément	6	2	5
(Spain) M Granollers	3	2
(France) M Gicquel	6	6
WC	(France) N Mahut	6	3	6
2	(France) G Simon	4	6	1

Second round
(Latvia) E Gulbis	4	4
(Serbia) J Tipsarević	6	6
Q	(France) R Jouan	3	3
4	(France) P-H Mathieu	6	6
Q	(France) A Mannarino	6	7
Q	(South Africa) R de Voest	4	5
(France) M Gicquel	6	7^{7}
WC	(France) N Mahut	3	6^{4}

Quarterfinals
(Serbia) J Tipsarević	6^{4}	3
4	(France) P-H Mathieu	7^{7}	6
Q	(France) A Mannarino	6	7^{7}
(France) M Gicquel	4	6^{3}

Semifinals
4	(France) P-H Mathieu	7^{8}	7^{7}
Q	(France) A Mannarino	6^{6}	6^{1}
