= 2009 Open de Moselle – Doubles =

Doubles
- 2009 Open de Moselle

Final
- Champion: (United Kingdom) Colin Fleming (United Kingdom) Ken Skupski
- Runner-up: (France) Arnaud Clément (France) Michaël Llodra
- Score: 2–6, 6–4, [10–5]

Events
Singles	Doubles
← 2008 ·	Open de Moselle	· 2010 →

Arnaud Clément and Michaël Llodra were the defending champion, but lost in the final 6–2, 4–6, [5–10], against Colin Fleming and Ken Skupski.

== Seeds ==
1. (France) Arnaud Clément / (France) Michaël Llodra (final)
2. (United Kingdom) Ross Hutchins / (Australia) Jordan Kerr (quarterfinals)
3. (Germany) Christopher Kas / (Netherlands) Rogier Wassen (quarterfinals)
4. (United States) Eric Butorac / (United States) Scott Lipsky (first round)

== Draw ==
=== Key ===
- Q = Qualifier
- WC = Wild card
- LL = Lucky loser
- Alt = Alternate
- SE = Special exempt
- PR = Protected ranking
- ITF = ITF entry
- JE = Junior exempt
- w/o = Walkover
- r = Retired
- d = Defaulted
- SR = Special ranking

=== Draw ===
First round
1	(France) A Clément (France) M Llodra	w/o
(India) R Bopanna (Finland) J Nieminen
(Chinese Taipei) Y-H Lu (Serbia) J Tipsarević	6^{3}	6	[7]
WC	(France) T Ascione (France) M Gicquel	7^{7}	2	[10]
4	(United States) E Butorac (United States) S Lipsky	4	4
(Germany) R Schüttler (Germany) M Zverev	6	6
(Kazakhstan) A Golubev (Italy) A Motti	7^{7}	2	[6]
(Germany) P Marx (Germany) B Phau	6^{4}	6	[10]
(Germany) F Moser (Belgium) C Rochus	6^{2}	1
(United Kingdom) C Fleming (United Kingdom) K Skupski	7^{7}	6
(Switzerland) Y Allegro (United States) D Martin	3	7^{7}	[5]
3	(Germany) C Kas (Netherlands) R Wassen	6	6^{4}	[10]
(Germany) A Beck (Germany) M Berrer	6	4	[4]
(Germany) P Kohlschreiber (Germany) P Petzschner	4	6	[10]
ALT	(Russia) E Korolev (Russia) D Sitak	6	0	[4]
2	(United Kingdom) R Hutchins (Australia) J Kerr	4	6	[10]

Quarterfinals
1	(France) A Clément (France) M Llodra	6	6
WC	(France) T Ascione (France) M Gicquel	2	1
(Germany) R Schüttler (Germany) M Zverev	6	6
(Germany) P Marx (Germany) B Phau	2	2
(United Kingdom) C Fleming (United Kingdom) K Skupski	6	3	[11]
3	(Germany) C Kas (Netherlands) R Wassen	3	6	[9]
(Germany) P Kohlschreiber (Germany) P Petzschner	7	6^{5}	[10]
2	(United Kingdom) R Hutchins (Australia) J Kerr	5	7^{7}	[7]

Semifinals
1	(France) A Clément (France) M Llodra	6	6
(Germany) R Schüttler (Germany) M Zverev	4	2
(United Kingdom) C Fleming (United Kingdom) K Skupski	6	6
(Germany) P Kohlschreiber (Germany) P Petzschner	1	4

Finals
1	(France) A Clément (France) M Llodra	6	4	[5]
(United Kingdom) C Fleming (United Kingdom) K Skupski	2	6	[10]
