= 2025 Moselle Open – Singles =

Singles
- 2025 Moselle Open

Final
- Champion: (United States) Learner Tien
- Runner-up: (United Kingdom) Cameron Norrie
- Score: 6–3, 3–6, 7–6^{(8–6)}

Details
- Draw: 28 (4Q, 3WC)
- Seeds: 8

Events
Singles	Doubles
← 2024 ·	Moselle Open

Learner Tien defeated Cameron Norrie in the final, 6–3, 3–6, 7–6^{(8–6)} to win the singles tennis title at the 2025 Moselle Open. It was his first ATP Tour title.

Benjamin Bonzi was the reigning champion, but withdrew before the tournament began due to a leg injury.

== Seeds ==
The top four seeds received a bye into the second round.

1. (Canada) Félix Auger-Aliassime (withdrew)
2. Daniil Medvedev (withdrew)
3. (Kazakhstan) Alexander Bublik (second round)
4. (Italy) Flavio Cobolli (second round)
5. (Netherlands) Tallon Griekspoor (withdrew)
6. (France) Arthur Rinderknech (first round)
7. (United Kingdom) Cameron Norrie (final)
8. (France) Corentin Moutet (first round)

== Draw ==
Key

- Q = Qualifier
- WC = Wild card
- LL = Lucky loser
- Alt = Alternate
- ITF = ITF entry
- PR = Protected ranking
- SR = Special ranking
- SE = Special exempt
- JE = Junior exempt
- JR = Junior Accelerator Programme entrant
- CO = College Accelerator Programme entrant
- NG = Next Gen Accelerator Program entrant
- w/o = Walkover
- r = Retired
- d = Defaulted

=== Finals ===
Semifinals
7	(United Kingdom) Cameron Norrie	4	6	6
(Italy) Lorenzo Sonego	6	2	4
LL	(Ukraine) Vitaliy Sachko	1	4
(United States) Learner Tien	6	6

Final
7	(United Kingdom) Cameron Norrie	3	6	6^{6}
(United States) Learner Tien	6	3	7^{8}

=== Top half ===
First round
LL	(France) K Jacquet	4	6	6
Q	(France) L Van Assche	6	3	4
(France) A Cazaux	6	7^{7}
(France) A Mannarino	3	6^{4}
(France) V Royer	3	7^{7}	3
7	(United Kingdom) C Norrie	6	6^{2}	6
Q	(United Kingdom) J Choinski	6	4	4
(Italy) L Sonego	4	6	6
(France) T Atmane	4	1
WC	(France) H Gaston	6	6
(Germany) D Altmaier	6	6
6	(France) A Rinderknech	4	4

Second round
LL	(France) D Added	0	2
LL	(France) K Jacquet	6	6
(France) A Cazaux	7^{7}	6^{7}	2
7	(United Kingdom) C Norrie	6^{1}	7^{9}	6
4	(Italy) F Cobolli	6	3	5
(Italy) L Sonego	2	6	7
WC	(France) H Gaston	6	0	0^{r}
(Germany) D Altmaier	4	6	0

Quarterfinals
LL	(France) K Jacquet	6	6^{2}	4
7	(United Kingdom) C Norrie	4	7^{7}	6
(Italy) L Sonego	6	7^{8}
(Germany) D Altmaier	4	6^{6}

Semifinals
7	(United Kingdom) C Norrie	4	6	6
(Italy) L Sonego	6	2	4

=== Bottom half ===
First round
Q	(France) C Tabur	6	6
(United States) A Kovacevic	3	2
Q	(Italy) F Passaro	6	3	4
NG	(Belgium) A Blockx	3	6	6
(France) G Mpetshi Perricard	6^{10}	3
LL	(Ukraine) V Sachko	7^{12}	6
8	(France) C Moutet	6	6^{6}	6^{8}
(Australia) A Vukic	3	7^{8}	7^{10}
(Italy) M Berrettini	6	6
(France) Q Halys	2	4
WC	(France) U Blanchet	3	3
(United States) L Tien	6	6

Second round
Q	(France) C Tabur	6^{4}	7^{8}	7^{8}
NG	(Belgium) A Blockx	7^{7}	6^{6}	6^{6}
LL	(Ukraine) V Sachko	7	3	7
3	(Kazakhstan) A Bublik	5	6	5
(Australia) A Vukic	6^{5}	3
(Italy) M Berrettini	7^{7}	6
(United States) L Tien	7^{7}	6
LL	(Tunisia) M Echargui	6^{3}	3

Quarterfinals
Q	(France) C Tabur	4	6	4
LL	(Ukraine) V Sachko	6	3	6
(Italy) M Berrettini	7	2	3
(United States) L Tien	5	6	6

Semifinals
LL	(Ukraine) V Sachko	1	4
(United States) L Tien	6	6

== Qualifying ==
=== Seeds ===
1. (Australia) Tristan Schoolkate (first round)
2. (Kazakhstan) Alexander Shevchenko (first round)
3. (United Kingdom) Billy Harris (first round)
4. (United Kingdom) Jan Choinski (qualified)
5. (Italy) Francesco Passaro (qualified)
6. (Norway) Nicolai Budkov Kjær (first round)
7. (Italy) Andrea Pellegrino (first round)
8. (Tunisia) Moez Echargui (qualifying competition, lucky loser)

=== Qualifiers ===
1. (Italy) Francesco Passaro
2. (France) Clément Tabur
3. (France) Luca Van Assche
4. (United Kingdom) Jan Choinski

=== Lucky losers ===
1. (France) Kyrian Jacquet
2. (Ukraine) Vitaliy Sachko
3. (Tunisia) Moez Echargui
4. (France) Dan Added

=== Qualifying draw ===
==== First qualifier ====
First round
1	(Australia) Tristan Schoolkate	4	7^{7}	6^{5}
(France) Dan Added	6	6^{2}	7^{7}
Alt	(France) Arthur Bouquier	1	1
5	(Italy) Francesco Passaro	6	6

Qualifying competition
(France) Dan Added	0	4
5	(Italy) Francesco Passaro	6	6

==== Second qualifier ====
First round
2	(Kazakhstan) Alexander Shevchenko	3	1
(Ukraine) Vitaliy Sachko	6	6
WC	(France) Clément Tabur	7	7
6	(Norway) Nicolai Budkov Kjær	5	5

Qualifying competition
(Ukraine) Vitaliy Sachko	7	3	3
WC	(France) Clément Tabur	5	6	6

==== Third qualifier ====
First round
3	(United Kingdom) Billy Harris	1	7^{11}	4
Alt	(France) Luca Van Assche	6	6^{9}	6
WC	(France) Tom Paris	6	4	6^{3}
8	(Tunisia) Moez Echargui	4	6	7^{7}

Qualifying competition
Alt	(France) Luca Van Assche	5	7^{7}	6
8	(Tunisia) Moez Echargui	7	6^{5}	1

==== Fourth qualifier ====
First round
4	(United Kingdom) Jan Choinski	5
(France) Harold Mayot	2^{r}
(France) Kyrian Jacquet	4	6	6
7	(Italy) Andrea Pellegrino	6	1	2

Qualifying competition
4	(United Kingdom) Jan Choinski	6	5	6
(France) Kyrian Jacquet	4	7	2
