= 2008 Open de Moselle – Doubles =

Doubles
- 2008 Open de Moselle

Final
- Champions: (France) Arnaud Clément (France) Michaël Llodra
- Runners-up: (Poland) Mariusz Fyrstenberg (Poland) Marcin Matkowski
- Score: 5–7, 6–3, [10–8]

Events
Singles	Doubles
← 2007 ·	Open de Moselle	· 2009 →

Arnaud Clément and Michaël Llodra were the defending champions, and won in the final 5–7, 6–3, [10–8], against Mariusz Fyrstenberg and Marcin Matkowski.

== Seeds ==
1. (Poland) Mariusz Fyrstenberg / (Poland) Marcin Matkowski (final)
2. (France) Arnaud Clément / (France) Michaël Llodra (champions)
3. (Czech Republic) Martin Damm / (Czech Republic) Pavel Vízner (quarterfinals)
4. (Brazil) Marcelo Melo / (Brazil) André Sá (semifinals)

== Draw ==
=== Key ===
- Q = Qualifier
- WC = Wild card
- LL = Lucky loser
- Alt = Alternate
- SE = Special exempt
- PR = Protected ranking
- ITF = ITF entry
- JE = Junior exempt
- w/o = Walkover
- r = Retired
- d = Defaulted
- SR = Special ranking

=== Draw ===
First round
1	(Poland) M Fyrstenberg (Poland) M Matkowski	6	7
(Spain) F López (United Kingdom) J Murray	3	5
(Spain) M Granollers (Spain) Montañés	2	0
(South Africa) J Coetzee (South Africa) R de Voest	6	6
4	(Brazil) M Melo (Brazil) A Sá	7	6
(Slovakia) D Hrbatý (Czech Republic) R Štěpánek	5	1
(France) J Chardy (France) G Simon	5	6^{5}
(Croatia) M Ančić (Croatia) I Ljubičić	7	7^{7}
WC	(France) T Ascione (France) M Gicquel	7^{7}	7^{7}
(France) N Devilder (France) P-H Mathieu	6^{2}	6^{3}
(Argentina) L Arnold Ker (Brazil) B Soares	1	6	[7]
3	(Czech Republic) M Damm (Czech Republic) P Vízner	6	3	[10]
ALT	(Argentina) A Calleri (Argentina) G Cañas	5	7^{7}	[9]
(France) J Benneteau (France) N Mahut	7	6^{4}	[11]
WC	(France) J Mathieu (France) O Mutis	4	4
2	(France) A Clément (France) M Llodra	6	6

Quarterfinals
1	(Poland) M Fyrstenberg (Poland) M Matkowski	7^{7}	7^{7}
(South Africa) J Coetzee (South Africa) R de Voest	6^{2}	6^{4}
4	(Brazil) M Melo (Brazil) A Sá	2	6	[10]
(Croatia) M Ančić (Croatia) I Ljubičić	6	2	[4]
WC	(France) T Ascione (France) M Gicquel	6	4	[13]
3	(Czech Republic) M Damm (Czech Republic) P Vízner	3	6	[11]
(France) J Benneteau (France) N Mahut	6	5	[6]
2	(France) A Clément (France) M Llodra	3	7	[10]

Semifinals
1	(Poland) M Fyrstenberg (Poland) M Matkowski	6	5	[10]
4	(Brazil) M Melo (Brazil) A Sá	4	7	[4]
WC	(France) T Ascione (France) M Gicquel	6	6^{4}	[9]
2	(France) A Clément (France) M Llodra	4	7^{7}	[11]

Final
1	(Poland) M Fyrstenberg (Poland) M Matkowski	7	3	[8]
2	(France) A Clément (France) M Llodra	5	6	[10]
