= 2025 Moselle Open – Doubles =

Doubles
- 2025 Moselle Open

Final
- Champions: (France) Quentin Halys (France) Pierre-Hugues Herbert
- Runners-up: (Argentina) Guido Andreozzi (France) Manuel Guinard
- Score: 7–5, 6–3

Events
| Singles | Doubles |
| ← 2024 · | Moselle Open |

Quentin Halys and Pierre-Hugues Herbert defeated Guido Andreozzi and Manuel Guinard in the final, 7–5, 6–3 to win the doubles title at the 2025 Moselle Open.

Sander Arends and Luke Johnson were the defending champions, but lost in the semifinals to Halys and Herbert.

== Seeds ==
1. (Sweden) André Göransson / (Poland) Jan Zieliński (first round)
2. (Netherlands) Sander Arends / (United Kingdom) Luke Johnson (semifinals)
3. (Argentina) Guido Andreozzi / (France) Manuel Guinard (final)
4. (Brazil) Fernando Romboli / (Australia) John-Patrick Smith (first round)

== Draw ==
Key

- Q = Qualifier
- WC = Wild card
- LL = Lucky loser
- Alt = Alternate
- ITF = ITF entry
- PR = Protected ranking
- SR = Special ranking
- SE = Special exempt
- JE = Junior exempt
- JR = Junior Accelerator Programme entrant
- CO = College Accelerator Programme entrant
- NG = Next Gen Accelerator Program entrant
- w/o = Walkover
- r = Retired
- d = Defaulted

=== Draw ===
First round
1 | (Sweden) A Göransson (Poland) J Zieliński | 6 | 3 | [7]
PR | (India) RC Bollipalli (India) A Kadhe | 3 | 6 | [10]
(Czech Republic) P Nouza (Czech Republic) P Rikl | 6 | 6
(Ecuador) D Hidalgo (United States) P Trhac | 3 | 4
3 | (Argentina) G Andreozzi (France) M Guinard | 4 | 6 | [10]
(Switzerland) J Paul (Czech Republic) M Vocel | 6 | 0 | [7]
(Germany) C Frantzen (Netherlands) R Haase | 3 | 6 | [11]
WC | (France) U Blanchet (France) K Jacquet | 6 | 4 | [9]
(France) T Arribagé (France) A Olivetti | 2 | 7 | [5]
WC | (France) D Added (France) T Paris | 6 | 5 | [10]
(France) Q Halys (France) P-H Herbert | 4 | 6 | [10]
4 | (Brazil) F Romboli (Australia) J-P Smith | 6 | 2 | [4]
(Brazil) R Matos (Brazil) M Melo | 7 | 6
(Chinese Taipei) R Ho (Australia) MC Romios | 5 | 3
(India) S Balaji (Germany) H Jebens | 1 | 4
2 | (Netherlands) S Arends (United Kingdom) L Johnson | 6 | 6

Quarterfinals
PR | (India) RC Bollipalli (India) A Kadhe | 6^{2} | 5
(Czech Republic) P Nouza (Czech Republic) P Rikl | 7^{7} | 7
3 | (Argentina) G Andreozzi (France) M Guinard | 6 | 6
(Germany) C Frantzen (Netherlands) R Haase | 4 | 4
WC | (France) D Added (France) T Paris | 2 | 5
(France) Q Halys (France) P-H Herbert | 6 | 7
(Brazil) R Matos (Brazil) M Melo | 6 | 3 | [5]
2 | (Netherlands) S Arends (United Kingdom) L Johnson | 4 | 6 | [10]

Semifinals
(Czech Republic) P Nouza (Czech Republic) P Rikl | 6^{7} | 6 | [7]
3 | (Argentina) G Andreozzi (France) M Guinard | 7^{9} | 1 | [10]
(France) Q Halys (France) P-H Herbert | 6 | 4 | [12]
2 | (Netherlands) S Arends (United Kingdom) L Johnson | 2 | 6 | [10]

Final
3 | (Argentina) G Andreozzi (France) M Guinard | 5 | 3
(France) Q Halys (France) P-H Herbert | 7 | 6
