= 2008 Open de Moselle =

Tennis tournament

- Date: September 29 – October 5
- Edition: 6th
- Category: International Series
- Draw: 32S / 16D
- Prize money: €349,000
- Surface: Hard / indoor
- Location: Metz, France
- Venue: Arènes de Metz

Champions

Singles
- (Russia) Dmitry Tursunov

Doubles
- (France) Arnaud Clément / (France) Michaël Llodra
- Open de Moselle

The 2008 Open de Moselle was a men's tennis tournament played on indoor hard courts. It was the sixth edition of the Open de Moselle, and was part of the International Series of the 2008 ATP Tour. It took place at the Arènes de Metz in Metz, France, from September 29 through October 5, 2008.

The announced field featured ATP No. 14, Cincinnati Masters semi-finalist, two-time Nottingham champion Ivo Karlović, Casablanca, Toronto Masters semi-finalist, Indianapolis and Bucharest titlist Gilles Simon, and Costa do Sauípe, Acapulco winner Nicolás Almagro. Also lined up were Marseille and Munich semi-finalist Paul-Henri Mathieu, Sydney champion Dmitry Tursunov, Andreas Seppi, Radek Štěpánek and Mario Ančić.

== Finals ==
=== Singles ===
(Russia) Dmitry Tursunov defeated (France) Paul-Henri Mathieu, 7–6^{(8–6)}, 1–6, 6–4

- It was Dmitry Tursunov's 2nd title of the year, and his 5th overall.

=== Doubles ===
(France) Arnaud Clément / (France) Michaël Llodra defeated (Poland) Mariusz Fyrstenberg / (Poland) Marcin Matkowski, 5–7, 6–3, [10–8]
