= 2010 Open de Moselle =

- Date: 20–26 September
- Edition: 8th
- Category: World Tour 250
- Draw: 28S / 16D
- Prize money: €398,250
- Surface: Hard / indoor
- Location: Metz, France
- Venue: Arènes de Metz

Champions

Singles
- (France) Gilles Simon

Doubles
- (Jamaica) Dustin Brown / (Netherlands) Rogier Wassen
- Open de Moselle

The 2010 Open de Moselle was a tennis tournament played on indoor hard courts. It was the eighth edition of the Open de Moselle, and is part of the ATP World Tour 250 Series of the 2010 ATP World Tour. It was held at the Arènes de Metz in Metz, France, from 20 September until 26 September 2010. Eighth-seeded Gilles Simon won the singles title.

== Entrants ==
=== Seeds ===
Country	Player	Rank^{1}	Seed
CRO	Marin Čilić	14	1
FRA	~~Gaël Monfils~~	~~15~~	~~2~~
CRO	Ivan Ljubičić	17	3
FRA	Richard Gasquet	29	4
FRA	~~Michaël Llodra~~	~~30~~	~~5~~
GER	Philipp Kohlschreiber	31	6
ESP	Tommy Robredo	40	7
FRA	Gilles Simon	41	8

- Seeds are based on the rankings of 13 September 2010.

=== Other entrants ===
The following players received wildcards into the singles main draw:

- (France) Thierry Ascione
- (Croatia) Marin Čilić
- (France) Adrian Mannarino

The following players received entry from the qualifying draw:

- (Italy) Thomas Fabbiano
- (France) Édouard Roger-Vasselin
- (Netherlands) Igor Sijsling
- (Germany) Mischa Zverev

The following player received the lucky losers spots:

- (Argentina) Federico Delbonis
- (France) Nicolas Mahut

== Finals ==
=== Singles ===
(France) Gilles Simon defeated (Germany) Mischa Zverev 6–3, 6–2

- It was Simon's first title of the year, and the seventh of his career.

=== Doubles ===
(Jamaica) Dustin Brown / (Netherlands) Rogier Wassen defeated (Brazil) Marcelo Melo / (Brazil) Bruno Soares, 6–3, 6–3
