= 2013 Moselle Open =

- Date: 16–22 September
- Edition: 11th
- Category: World Tour 250
- Draw: 28S / 16D
- Prize money: €410,200
- Surface: Hard
- Location: Metz, France
- Venue: Parc des Expositions de Metz Métropole

Champions

Singles
- (France) Gilles Simon

Doubles
- (Sweden) Johan Brunström / (South Africa) Raven Klaasen
- Moselle Open

The 2013 Moselle Open was a men's tennis tournament held in Metz, France and played on indoor hard courts. It was the 11th edition of the Moselle Open, and part of the ATP World Tour 250 series of the 2013 ATP World Tour. It was held at the Parc des Expositions de Metz Métropole from 16 September until 22 September 2013. Second-seeded Gilles Simon won the singles title.

== Singles main-draw entrants ==
=== Seeds ===
Country	Player	Rank^{1}	Seed
FRA	Jo-Wilfried Tsonga	8	1
FRA	Gilles Simon	16	2
ITA	Andreas Seppi	22	3
GER	Philipp Kohlschreiber	25	4
FRA	Benoît Paire	28	5
USA	Sam Querrey	31	6
FRA	Jérémy Chardy	39	7
GER	Florian Mayer	44	8

- ^{1} Rankings are as of September 9, 2013.

=== Other entrants ===
The following players received wild cards into the singles main draw:

- (France) Paul-Henri Mathieu
- (France) Albano Olivetti
- (France) Gilles Simon

The following players received entry from the singles qualifying draw:

- (Hungary) Márton Fucsovics
- (France) Marc Gicquel
- (France) Pierre-Hugues Herbert
- (Germany) Mischa Zverev

The following player received entry as a lucky loser:

- (Germany) Michael Berrer

=== Withdrawals ===
Before the tournament

- (Spain) Marcel Granollers
- (Austria) Andreas Haider-Maurer (illness)
- (Canada) Vasek Pospisil

=== Retirements ===
- (Germany) Philipp Kohlschreiber (right knee injury)
- (France) Paul-Henri Mathieu (right leg injury)

== Doubles main-draw entrants ==
=== Seeds ===
Country	Player	Country	Player	Rank^{1}	Seed
IND	Rohan Bopanna	FRA	Édouard Roger-Vasselin	31	1
AUT	Julian Knowle	BRA	Marcelo Melo	52	2
GBR	Jamie Murray	AUS	John Peers	76	3
GER	Andre Begemann	GER	Martin Emmrich	77	4

- Rankings are as of September 9, 2013

=== Other entrants ===
The following pairs received wildcards into the doubles main draw:

- (France) Jérémy Chardy / (France) Marc Gicquel
- (France) Pierre-Hugues Herbert / (France) Albano Olivetti

== Finals ==
=== Singles ===
(France) Gilles Simon defeated (France) Jo-Wilfried Tsonga, 6–4, 6–3

=== Doubles ===
(Sweden) Johan Brunström / (South Africa) Raven Klaasen defeated (France) Nicolas Mahut / (France) Jo-Wilfried Tsonga, 6–4, 7–6^{(7–5)}
