= 2025 Moselle Open =

- Date: 2–8 November
- Edition: 22nd
- Category: ATP Tour 250 series
- Surface: Hard (indoor)
- Location: Metz, France
- Venue: Arènes de Metz

Champions

Singles
- (United States) Learner Tien

Doubles
- (France) Quentin Halys / (France) Pierre-Hugues Herbert
- Moselle Open

The 2025 Moselle Open was a men's tennis tournament played on indoor hardcourts. It was the 22nd and last edition of the event, and part of the ATP 250 tournaments on the 2025 ATP Tour. It took place at the Arènes de Metz from 2 to 8 November 2025.

== Champions ==
=== Singles ===
- (United States) Learner Tien def. (United Kingdom) Cameron Norrie, 6–3, 3–6, 7–6^{(8–6)}

=== Doubles ===
- (France) Quentin Halys / (France) Pierre-Hugues Herbert def. (Argentina) Guido Andreozzi / (France) Manuel Guinard, 7–5, 6–3

== Singles main-draw entrants ==
=== Seeds ===
Country	Player	Rank^{1}	Seed
~~CAN~~	~~Félix Auger-Aliassime~~	~~10~~	~~1~~
	~~Daniil Medvedev~~	~~13~~	~~2~~
KAZ	Alexander Bublik	16	3
ITA	Flavio Cobolli	23	4
~~NED~~	~~Tallon Griekspoor~~	~~25~~	~~5~~
FRA	Arthur Rinderknech	29	6
GBR	Cameron Norrie	31	7
FRA	Corentin Moutet	32	8

- ^{1} Rankings are as of 27 October 2025

=== Other entrants ===
The following players received wildcards into the singles main draw:

- (France) Ugo Blanchet
- (France) Hugo Gaston
- ~~Daniil Medvedev~~

The following player received entry through the Next Gen Accelerator programme:

- (Belgium) Alexander Blockx

The following player received a late entry into the singles main draw:

- ~~(Czech Republic) Tomáš Macháč~~

The following players received entry from the qualifying draw:

- (United Kingdom) Jan Choinski
- (Italy) Francesco Passaro
- (France) Clément Tabur
- (France) Luca Van Assche

The following players received entry as lucky losers:

- (France) Dan Added
- (Tunisia) Moez Echargui
- (France) Kyrian Jacquet
- (Ukraine) Vitaliy Sachko

=== Withdrawals ===
- (Canada) Félix Auger-Aliassime → replaced by (France) Dan Added
- (Belgium) Zizou Bergs → replaced by (France) Quentin Halys
- (France) Benjamin Bonzi → replaced by (France) Adrian Mannarino
- (Canada) Gabriel Diallo → replaced by (France) Arthur Cazaux
- (Netherlands) Tallon Griekspoor → replaced by (Ukraine) Vitaliy Sachko
- (France) Ugo Humbert → replaced by (United States) Aleksandar Kovacevic
- (Czech Republic) Tomáš Macháč → replaced by (France) Kyrian Jacquet
- Daniil Medvedev → replaced by (Tunisia) Moez Echargui
- (United States) Alex Michelsen → replaced by (France) Térence Atmane
- (United States) Frances Tiafoe → replaced by (Italy) Matteo Berrettini

== Doubles main-draw entrants ==
=== Seeds ===
Country	Player	Country	Player	Rank^{1}	Seed
SWE	André Göransson	POL	Jan Zieliński	53	1
NED	Sander Arends	GBR	Luke Johnson	55	2
ARG	Guido Andreozzi	FRA	Manuel Guinard	55	3
BRA	Fernando Romboli	AUS	John-Patrick Smith	85	4

- Rankings are as of 27 October 2025

=== Other entrants ===
The following pairs received wildcards into the doubles main draw:

- (France) Dan Added / (France) Tom Paris
- (France) Ugo Blanchet / (France) Kyrian Jacquet
