= 2009 Open de Moselle =

- Date: 21–27 September
- Edition: 7th
- Category: World Tour 250
- Draw: 28S / 16D
- Prize money: €398,250
- Location: Metz, France
- Venue: Arènes de Metz

Champions

Singles
- (France) Gaël Monfils

Doubles
- (United Kingdom) Colin Fleming / (United Kingdom) Ken Skupski
- Open de Moselle

The 2009 Open de Moselle was a men's tennis tournament played on indoor hard courts. It was the seventh edition of the Open de Moselle, and was part of the ATP World Tour 250 Series of the 2009 ATP World Tour. It was held at the Arènes de Metz in Metz, France, from 21 September through 27 September 2009. First-seeded Gaël Monfils won the singles title.

== Entrants ==
=== Seeds ===
| Country | Player | Rank^{1} | Seed |
|---|---|---|---|
| FRA | Gaël Monfils | 13 | 1 |
| GER | Philipp Kohlschreiber | 23 | 2 |
| FRA | Paul-Henri Mathieu | 27 | 3 |
| GER | Philipp Petzschner | 35 | 4 |
| FRA | Fabrice Santoro | 41 | 5 |
| GER | Benjamin Becker | 42 | 6 |
| GER | Andreas Beck | 44 | 7 |
| CRO | Ivan Ljubičić | 47 | 8 |

- Seeds are based on the rankings of September 14, 2009

=== Other entrants ===
The following players received wildcards into the singles main draw

- (France) Josselin Ouanna
- (France) Sébastien Grosjean
- (France) Michaël Llodra

The following players received entry from the qualifying draw:

- (France) Thierry Ascione
- (Germany) Michael Berrer
- (France) Sébastien de Chaunac
- (Switzerland) Roman Valent

== Finals ==
=== Singles ===
(France) Gaël Monfils defeated (Germany) Philipp Kohlschreiber, 7–6^{(7–1)}, 3–6, 6–2

- It was Monfils' first title of the year and second of his career.

=== Doubles ===
(United Kingdom) Colin Fleming / (United Kingdom) Ken Skupski defeated (France) Arnaud Clément / (France) Michaël Llodra, 2–6, 6–4, [10–5]
