= Colin Fleming =

British tennis player (born 1984)

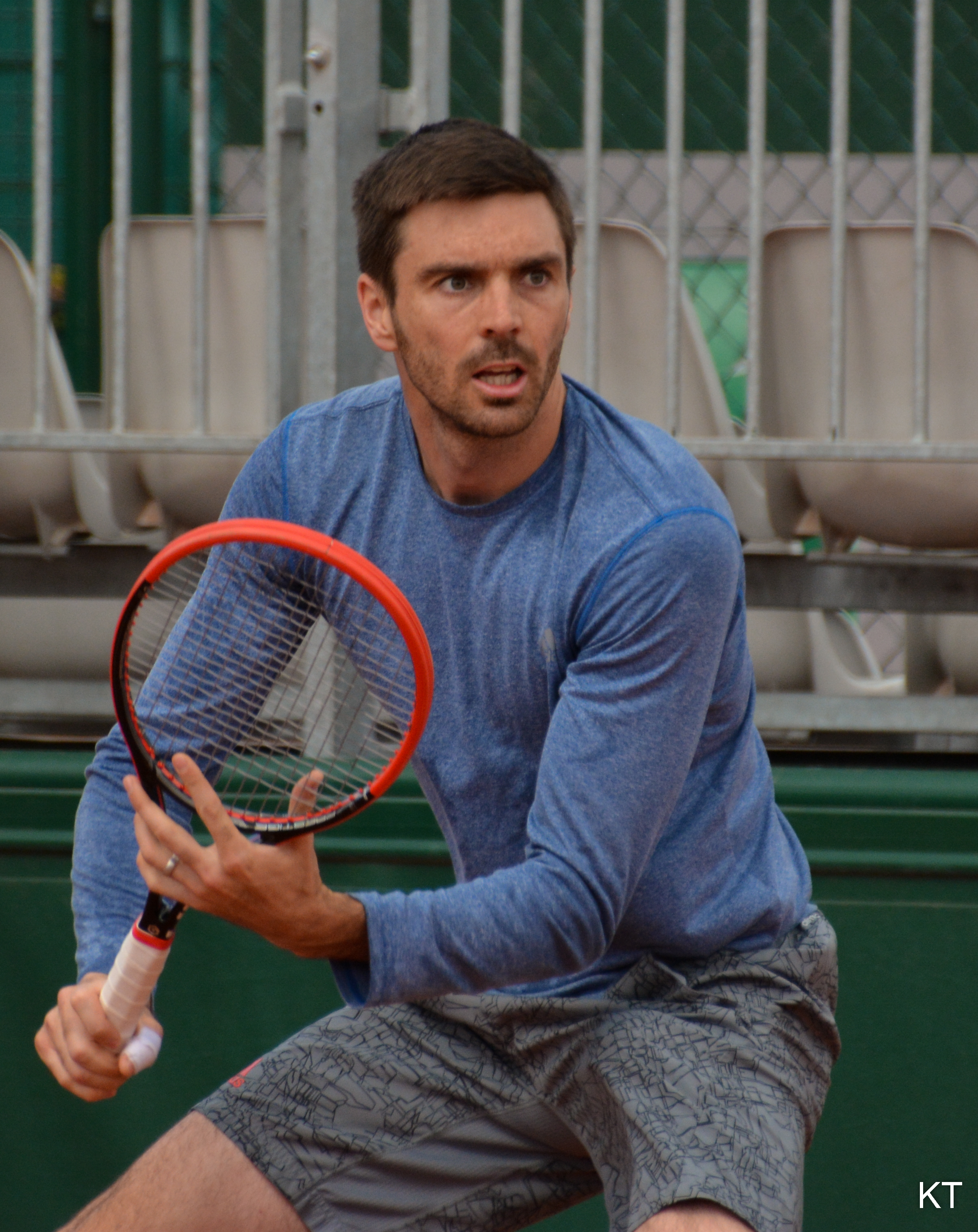
- Fleming at 2015 French Open
- Country (sports): (United Kingdom) Great Britain; Scotland
- Residence: Linlithgow, West Lothian
- Born: 13 August 1984 (age 42) Broxburn, Scotland
- Height: 1.88 m (6 ft 2 in)
- Turned pro: 2003
- Retired: 16 January 2017
- Plays: Right-handed
- Prize money: $1,076,823
- Official website: colinflemingtennis.com

Singles
- Career record: 1–2 (at ATP Tour level and Grand Slam level, and in Davis Cup)
- Career titles: 0
- Highest ranking: No. 359 (14 September 2009)

Doubles
- Career record: 173–153 (at ATP Tour level and Grand Slam level, and in Davis Cup)
- Career titles: 8
- Highest ranking: No. 17 (9 September 2013)

Grand Slam doubles results
- Australian Open: 3R (2012)
- French Open: 2R (2010, 2011, 2016)
- Wimbledon: QF (2011)
- US Open: QF (2011, 2013)

Other doubles tournaments
- Olympic Games: 1R (2012, 2016)

Mixed doubles
- Career record: 17–13 (57%)
- Career titles: 0

Grand Slam mixed doubles results
- Australian Open: QF (2012)
- French Open: 1R (2013, 2014)
- Wimbledon: QF (2012)
- US Open: QF (2012)

Team competitions
- Davis Cup: QF (2014)
Medal record
Commonwealth Games
Gold medal – first place	2010 Delhi	Mixed Doubles
- Last updated on: 20 January 2017.

Colin Fleming (born 13 August 1984) is a British retired professional tennis player who specialised in doubles.

As part of the Davis Cup team, he won eight successive doubles matches to help Great Britain into the World Group. He also won his doubles match in the World Group quarter final against Italy. At the 2010 Commonwealth Games, he won the mixed doubles gold medal with Jocelyn Rae for Scotland.

He has reached nineteen ATP Tour doubles finals in his career, winning eight of them: two in 2009, 2012 and 2013 and one in 2011 and 2015. In 2011, he had his best doubles Grand Slam results, reaching the quarterfinals of Wimbledon, and then two months later equalling it at the US Open.

He has had a number of different partners, but primarily played alongside his British compatriots, most notably Ross Hutchins, Jamie and Andy Murray, Ken Skupski and Jonathan Marray. Fleming's most successful partnership has been with Ross Hutchins, however whilst Hutchins was off the tour with illness, Fleming spent most of 2013 partnering with Marray.

He retired from professional tennis in January 2017, to take up the new position of national coach for Tennis Scotland.

== Early and personal life ==
Fleming first picked up a tennis racquet as a toddler and copied his older siblings by playing for a local club in Linlithgow. When he was eight, he began playing in mini tennis tournaments. Working his way up through the ranks Colin loved to compete, and regularly travelled long distances to play in regional challenge events and regional and GB junior tournaments. He was never at the top rank in the juniors, being small and slightly built until late teens, but held his own through court craft and determination. He also began his county career as a junior, representing North of Scotland, culminating in the great enjoyment he has in playing Summer County week and the camaraderie that he has with the North of Scotland players. As a teenager, he played in and around Edinburgh for the Blackhall club men's team. Brian Barnet coached Fleming up until he was about 14 when Fleming moved to the newly opened Next Generation club in Newhaven where Judy Murray began coaching.

Fleming is married with two children.

He is a known supporter of Partick Thistle F.C.

== University tennis career ==
=== 2001–2004 ===
Fleming left high school in 2001 at age 17 to study economics & finance at the University of Stirling as a sports bursar. The university offered him the opportunity to continue with his tennis training and competition as part of a high quality programme, otherwise he would have become a social player at that time. His tennis career was supported by the university when they enabled him to take two sabbatical years from 2004 to turn pro and join the tour.

=== 2005–2007 ===
Fleming partnered Jamie Murray, winning their first Futures tournament on 4 September 2005 at the Great Britain F10 Futures in Nottingham.

Fleming/Murray followed this with Futures titles at Glasgow, Edinburgh and Exmouth, amassing a total of four Futures plus four satellite tournaments.

In April 2006, Fleming was selected for the Davis Cup match against Serbia and Montenegro

Fleming and Jamie Murray's success gained them a wildcard into the main draw of the men's doubles at Wimbledon though they lost in the first round.

Fleming achieved career highs for singles and doubles, but in summer 2006, Fleming decided to quit the tour to return to Stirling in order to complete his University degree. Fleming said "At that stage I had no intentions of ever playing full-time again." He graduated with First Class Honours in 2007 and secured a graduate scheme position as an energy trader where he worked for ten months.

=== 2008 ===
Fleming helped Giffnock win the Scottish Cup and also represented his local club Linlithgow in the national league. With his hunger rekindled and his head set on making it in pro tennis, Colin decided to return to the tour in August 2008.

== Senior career ==
=== 2008 ===
Fleming considered himself to have turned properly professional in the summer of 2008, when he was 24.

In September, Fleming qualified for the singles in the Nottingham Futures F14, eventually reaching the semi-finals. A week later, Fleming played the singles in the Nottingham Futures F15, this time losing in the quarter-finals.

Ken Skupski was looking for a fellow British doubles partner who was capable of going to the top of the game, and thought Fleming's game style suited his.

Fleming/Skupski won three Futures in Glasgow, London, Sunderland and the Caversham International Challenger in Jersey.

The pair came to be known as 'Flemski'.

Ken Skupski finished the year there because he'd had a long year, but Fleming continued by partnering Jonny Marray in the Czech Republic and winning two Futures in Frydland Nad Ostravici, and Opava

=== 2009 ===
In February, the Davis Cup captain John Lloyd decided to hold play-offs between six British tennis hopefuls to determine the players for the next tie. Fleming won one match, but Josh Goodall and Chris Eaton were chosen for the singles. Fleming had won six doubles tournaments matches in 2008 and was selected for the doubles.

In March, Fleming, ranked 289, made his debut in Great Britain's Davis Cup team for their Europe/Africa Zone Group I match against Ukraine in Renfrewshire. Fleming and Ross Hutchins, ranked 44, lost a tightly contested match to Sergiy Stakhovsky and Sergei Bubka, Ukraine winning 6–4, 3–6, 6–3, 5–7, 6–4 to give Ukraine an unassailable 3–0 lead.

In June, Fleming/Skupski beat the world no. 1 ranked doubles pair, Mike Bryan and Bob Bryan, at the Queen's Club grass court tournament. However they were put out in the first round at Wimbledon in five sets having led by two sets to love.

In September, Fleming/Skupski both won their first doubles tournament on the ATP Tour circuit at the Open de Moselle in France 2–6, 6–4, [10–5]. A few months later they won their second title at the St. Petersburg Open winning 2–6, 7–5, [10–4].

=== 2010 ===
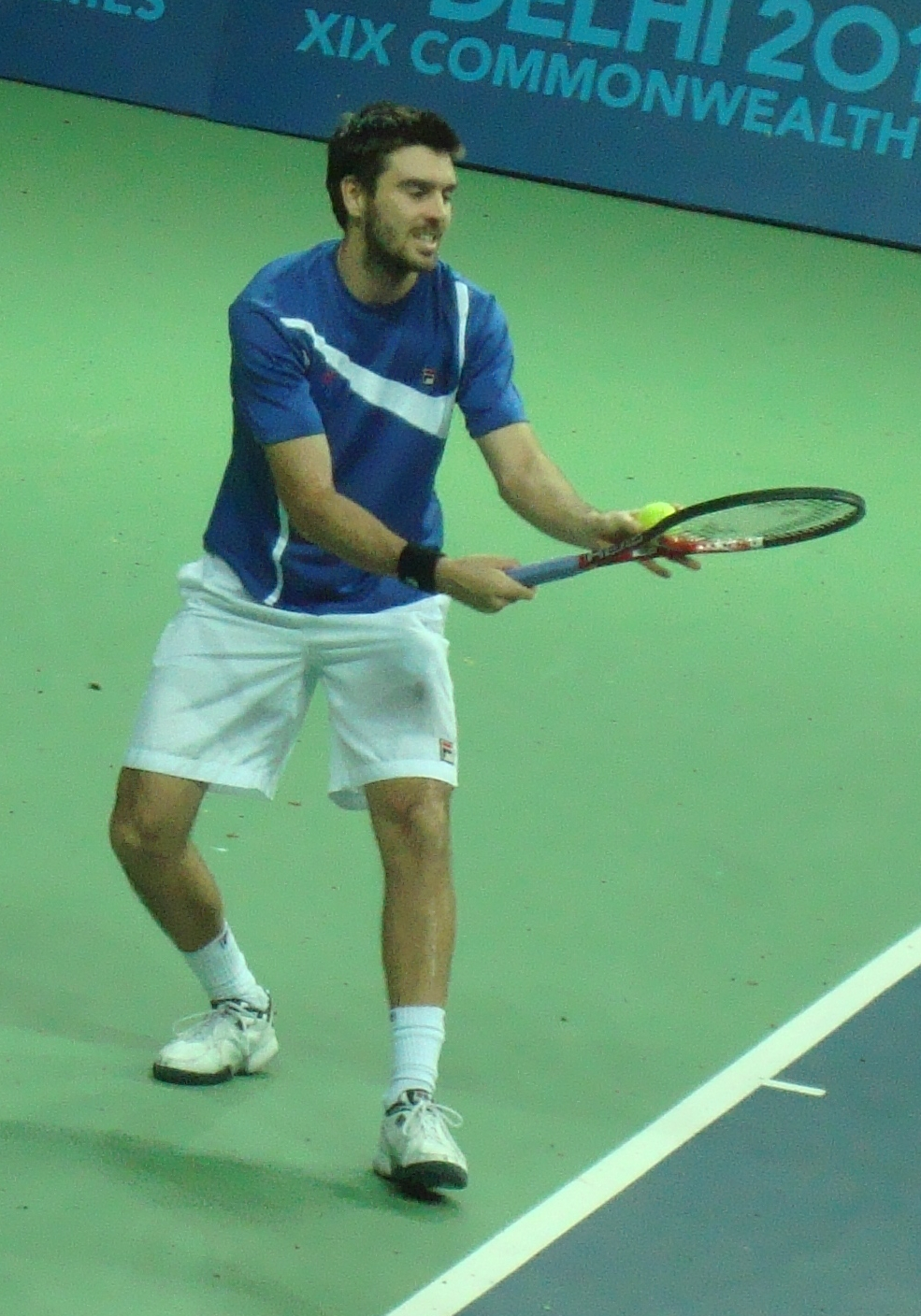
Fleming at 2010 Commonwealth Games mixed doubles final match.

In January Fleming competed in his first grand slam outside of Wimbledon at the Australian open again partnering Ken Skupski made it to the second round.

In March, Fleming and Skupski were called to the Davis Cup team in the Europe/Africa Zone Group II tie vs Lithuania, in Vilnius, with James Ward, and Dan Evans. The Lithuanian side entered the tie as underdogs; fielding a team of teenagers. Ward won his debut Davis Cup match but Evans lost the second singles match. Fleming and Skupski, in his debut match, won the doubles, but Ward and Evans were both beaten on the final day. This was described as a humiliating Davis Cup defeat for Great Britain, and led to the resignation of Davis Cup Captain John Lloyd. Britain was now threatened with relegation to the lowest tier of the competition.

Fleming then competed at the French open for the first time again partnering Ken Skupski but fell at the second round in three sets.

Fleming/Skupski competed in the Eastbourne Open in England and got to the final only to lose to Mariusz Fyrstenberg and Marcin Matkowski in three sets 3–6, 7–5, [8–10]. For the first time he made it into the second round of Wimbledon but lost to the much more experienced Bryan brother's in straight sets again partnering Ken Skupski.

The new Davis Cup Captain Leon Smith selected Fleming to take part in Great Britain's vital Davis Cup tie vs Turkey, at Eastbourne, in July alongside Ken Skupski, James Ward, Jamie Baker, and Alex Ward. Defeat would have meant Great Britain's relegation to Europe Zone Group III, the lowest tier of the competition. Fleming/Skupski secured the 6–3, 6–4, 6–4 win that gave Britain an unassailable 3–0 lead, giving Great Britain a first Davis Cup win in three years.

At the 2010 Commonwealth Games in Delhi, Fleming and nineteen year old Jocelyn Rae played Mixed Doubles for Scotland. They had barely met and did not even know they were playing together until they arrived but won the gold medal by defeating the No 1 seeds, Australians Anastasia Rodionova and Paul Hanley, in three sets. Rodionova had already won the Singles and Women's doubles. Fleming/Rae were unable to defend their title in 2014 because tennis was not included in the Glasgow Games. Fleming also partnered Jamie Murray in the Men's Doubles but they lost in the first round.

Fleming for the first time competed at the US open and competed at all four grand slams for the first time. But fell in the first round in straight sets, once again partnering Ken Skupski.

In October, Fleming split from Ken Skupski, after defeat in the first round of the St. Petersburg Open, something which was particularly wounding given that the pair were defending the title. It meant Fleming's ranking dropped into the 90s when it was in the 60s at the start of the year.

Fleming and Ross Hutchins agreed to begin next year as steady partners, and in November they had a winning start at the Kazakhstan Challenger.

Two weeks later, Fleming and Jamie Murray won the Bratislava Challenger.

=== 2011 ===
Fleming and Ross Hutchins struggled with injuries and interruptions for much of the first six months.

In March, Fleming was called up to take part in Great Britain's Davis Cup 1st round tie vs Tunisia, at Bolton alongside Jamie Baker, James Ward and Jamie Murray. Fleming played alongside Jamie Murray versus Slim Hamza and Malek Jaziri, winning 6–1, 3–6, 6–3, 6–4. Great Britain went on to win the Europe/Africa Zone Group 1 tie 4–1.

In April, while his regular partner, Ross Hutchins, recovered from injury, Fleming reached the final of the ATP Casablanca Open in Morocco, this time partnering Igor Zelenay only to be beaten by Robert Lindstedt and Horia Tecău in straight sets 2–6, 1–6. A week later, Fleming and Scott Lipsky won the Status Athens Open Challenger final because their opponents Matthias Bachinger and Benjamin Becker withdrew.

At the beginning of June, Fleming/Hutchins won the Aegon Trophy Challenger in Nottingham.

At Wimbledon, Fleming and Ross Hutchins both had their best performances at a Grand Slam event in doubles, defeating 7th seeds Mariusz Fyrstenberg and Marcin Matkowski in the first round. Fleming and Hutchins won their first-ever five-set match together over Dmitry Tursunov and Grigor Dimitrov in the second round, on the way to the quarter-finals, where the pair lost a very tight five set thriller to Christopher Kas and Alexander Peya 4–6, 4–6, 7–6^{(7–2)}, 6–2, 4–6. They were the first British pair to reach the quarter-finals of the men's doubles tournament at Wimbledon since 1993. It was announced on the morning of the quarter-finals that Fleming had been picked alongside Jamie Murray for the doubles rubber for Britain's Davis Cup tie against Luxembourg in two weekends' time, leaving Hutchins on the sidelines. Fleming said "I think the team was picked before we went on a run to the quarters here."

Just before Great Britain's match against Luxembourg, Fleming had a slight niggle in his foot so he was replaced by Dan Evans as the back-up player. In the event, it was James Ward, Andy Murray and Jamie Murray who played, with Great Britain winning 4–1.

Two months later at the US Open, Fleming/Hutchins equalled their Wimbledon performance, once again reaching the quarterfinals. Despite a victory over 2nd seeds Max Mirnyi and Daniel Nestor in their second match, they ultimately lost in three sets to Rohan Bopanna and Aisam-ul-Haq Qureshi, blowing a match point opportunity in the deciding set.

Then in September, at the Davis Cup, Fleming helped Great Britain win their promotion tie 5–0 against Hungary to advance to Group I playing in both the doubles, partnered by Ross Hutchins, and one of the dead singles rubbers. This was his first ever ATP Tour singles match win, against Sebő Kiss 6–4, 6–3. James Ward was suffering the effects of his dramatic win over Attila Balázs on Friday, so Fleming came in for the final rubber and recorded his first singles win in Davis Cup.

Fleming/Hutchins later reached the semi-finals of the Open de Moselle in Metz but lost to second seeds Lukáš Dlouhý and Marcelo Melo in three sets. Fleming did however finally win his third title after a two-year wait, at the St. Petersburg Open, the last title he won back in 2009. They defeated Michail Elgin and Alexander Kudryavtsev in three sets 6–3, 6–7^{(5–7)}, [10–8]. This was Flemings first ATP title with Hutchins, and with the victory his world ranking rose to a career high rank of number 30 in the world.

In December, Colin Fleming got married.

=== 2012 ===
At the start of the 2012 season, Fleming and Hutchins reached the third round of the Australian Open for the first time, only to lose to the Bryan brothers, 4–6, 6–0, 2–6. This raised his ranking to a career high of no. 29 in the world. He also reached the quarterfinals of the mixed event with Liezel Huber.

In February, Fleming and Hutchins were called for the Davis Cup Europe/Africa Zone Group I tie against Slovakia. James Ward's loss and Dan Evans' win put the tie at 1–1 on the first day, then Fleming and Hutchins beat Michal Mertiňák and Filip Polášek 6–3 7–6 (7/4) 0–6 6–3. With Dan Evans winning his second match, Great Britain eventually won 3–2, making a fifth consecutive Davis Cup win under captain Leon Smith.

Fleming won his second title with Hutchins and his first in the 2012 season at the Delray Beach International Tennis Championships, defeating Michal Mertiňák and André Sá, 2–6, 7–6^{(7–5)}, [15–13]. This also raised his doubles ranking to a career high rank of no. 24 in the world.

In April, Fleming and Hutchins were selected for the Davis Cup Europe/Africa Zone Group I tie against Belgium. After Josh Goodall and Dan Evans lost on the first day, Fleming and Hutchins made it three straight victories in the competition by beating Ruben Bemelmans and David Goffin 4–6, 7–5, 6–3, 6–4. Great Britain were eventually beaten 4–1, ending Leon Smith's 5 match winning run as Davis Cup Captain.

Fleming was out of action for most of the clay court season because of a stress fracture in his tibia.

Returning in mid-June, Fleming won his second title of the year, again partnering Hutchins at the Aegon International. They defeated fellow Brits and good friends Jamie Delgado and Ken Skupski 6–4, 6–3. This was Fleming's third title with Hutchins. However, they had a disappointing run at Wimbledon, going out in the first round in five sets, even though they took the first two, 6–3, 6–4, 2–6, 6–7^{(5–7)}, 3–6 to Mikhail Kukushkin and Lukáš Rosol. In the mixed doubles event, Fleming had more success partnering Hsieh Su-wei. They made it to the quarterfinals, where they lost to third seeds Nenad Zimonjić and Katarina Srebotnik in straight sets, 6–7^{(3–7)}, 3–6.

In their first tournament after Wimbledon, Fleming and Hutchins competed at the Campbell's Hall of Fame Tennis Championships. They got to the final, but were defeated by Santiago González and Scott Lipsky in straight sets, 6–7^{(3–7)}, 3–6. Having lost in the semifinals at the BB&T Atlanta Open, Fleming next competed at the London 2012 Summer Olympics in the doubles event, partnering Hutchins again in their first Olympics. However, they lost in the first round to Benneteau and Gasquet in a very disappointing straight-sets defeat 5–7, 3–6.

At the last Major of the season Fleming and Hutchins made it to the third round of the US Open before being beaten by Brothers and home Favorites Ryan Harrison and Christian Harrison in straight sets 3–6, 4–6. Fleming also competed in the mixed doubles event, partnering Sania Mirza of India. They were beaten in the quarter finals by fourth seeds Květa Peschke and Marcin Matkowski in straight sets 3–6, 5–7. In the second round, they defeated defending champions Melanie Oudin and Jack Sock in straight sets.

Fleming/Hutchins failed to defend their title at the St. Petersburg Open, only reaching the quarter-finals. Fleming and Hutchins next headed off to Asia, where they reached the final in their first tournament at the ATP Malaysia Open, this also being their fourth final of the season. However, after a bright start, they lost the final in three sets 7–5, 5–7, [7–10] to Alexander Peya and Bruno Soares.

Fleming made his debut at a Masters 1000 event in Shanghai, where Fleming/Hutchins had their best run at a masters 1000 event making the semi-finals, only to narrowly lose to the Indian duo of Mahesh Bhupathi and Rohan Bopanna 7–6^{(7–4)}, 3–6, [8–10] whilst serving for the match.

Fleming/Hutchins lost in the first round of the Valencia ATP, so they now knew that they had failed their season-long goal of qualifying for the Barclays ATP World Tour Finals, where the year's eight most successful doubles teams play. They were ninth in the doubles list and meant they could not beat the points totals of the pairs they needed to overhaul.

At the Paris Masters 1000, they reached the second round.

In December, Ross Hutchins was diagnosed with Hodgkin's lymphoma, and took an indefinite break from tennis while he recovered.

=== 2013 ===
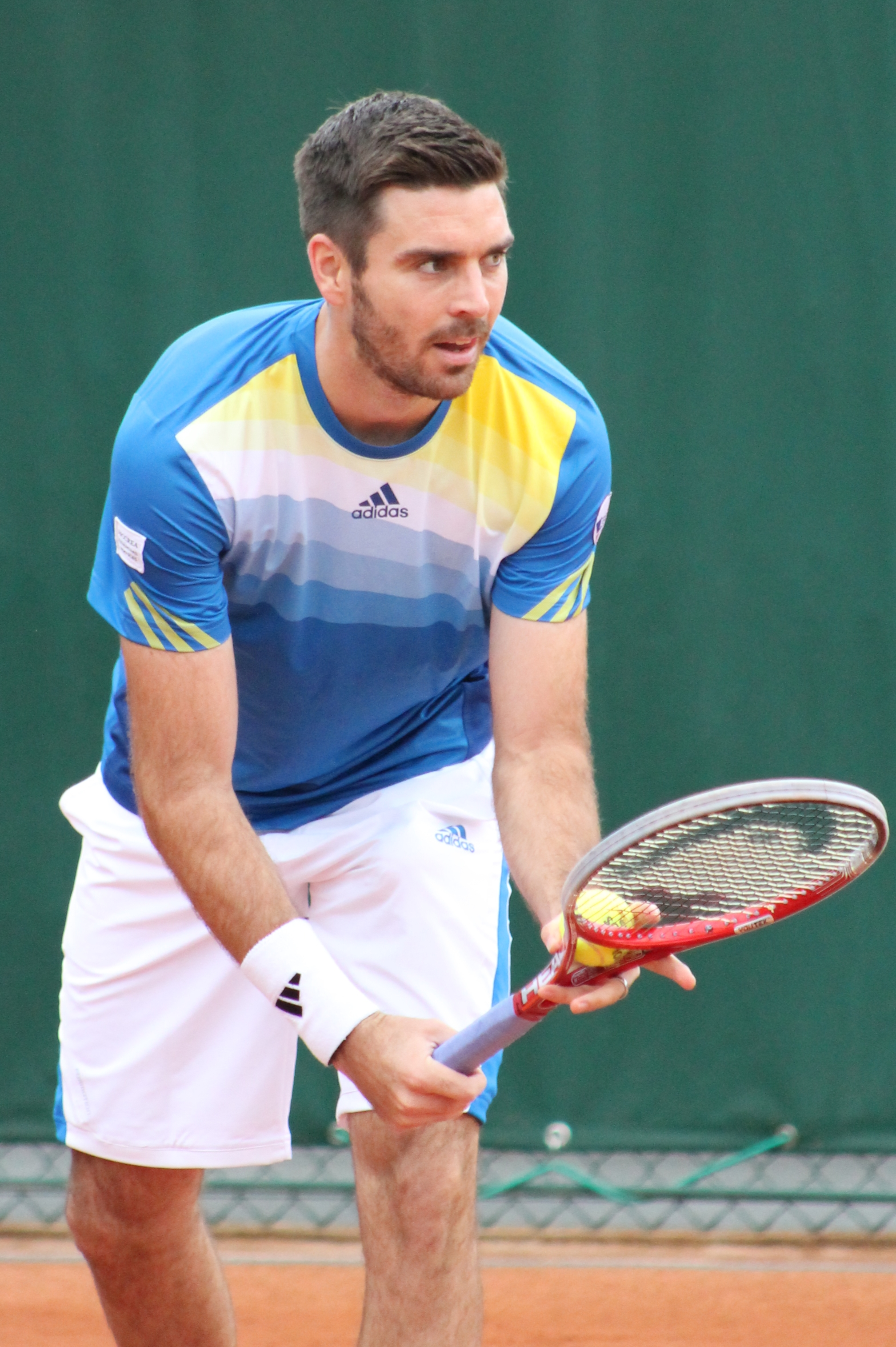
Fleming at 2013 French Open.

Fleming made a strong start to the 2013 season, winning the doubles title at the Heineken Open with Brazilian partner Bruno Soares, as Fleming's regular doubles partner Ross Hutchins was out with illness. Fleming teamed up with fellow Scot Jamie Murray for the Australian Open, however they lost in the first round to Michael Kohlmann and Jarkko Nieminen. Following a break of around two weeks, Fleming then teamed up with Wimbledon champion Jonathan Marray at the Open Sud de France where they were the top seeds. The pair made it to the semifinals before losing in three sets to Sweden's Johan Brunström, and Raven Klaasen of South Africa. The following week, Fleming teamed up with Rohan Bopanna of India, with whom he won his second title of the year at the Open 13 in France, defeating Bopanna's former partner Aisam-ul-Haq Qureshi and Dutchman Jean-Julien Rojer in straight sets in the final.

At Indian Wells, Fleming teamed up with Paul Hanley of Australia, with whom he made it to the quarterfinals before losing to Bruno Soares and Alexander Peya.

After a first round defeat in the Miami Masters, partnered by Jonathan Marray, the two Brits returned to the UK for Great Britain's first Davis Cup fixture of the year. After Russia took the first two singles rubbers, both in five sets, Fleming and Marray pulled one back against Victor Baluda and Igor Kunitsyn, defeating the duo in straight sets, 6–1, 6–4, 6–2 in only an hour and a half to keep the tie alive. A day later James Ward levelled the tie at 2–2 after beating Tursunov in five sets. Dan Evans faced world no. 80 Evgeny Donskoy in the final rubber, defeating Donskoy comprehensively in straight sets, thus securing what was described as a "famous victory". The last time Great Britain had come from 2–0 down to win a Davis Cup tie was 83 years previously against Germany, Consequently, Great Britain won a place in the 16-team World Group play-offs in September.

Continuing his partnership with Marray, Fleming reached his second career ATP final, at the Aegon International in Eastbourne. En route to the final, the pair defeated Marray's former partner Frederik Nielsen, with whom he had won the Wimbledon doubles title the previous year. In the final the pair faced the duo of Austrian Alexander Peya and Bruno Soares of Brazil. Despite a strong start in which they took the first set, the pair couldn't maintain their intensity and ultimately lost in three sets, a trio of double faults from Marray in the 8th game of the second set proving to be fatal.

Fleming entered Wimbledon with Marray. The two made it to the third round, but they couldn't replicate the form that saw Marray clinch the title during the previous season, going out in straight sets to Daniel Nestor, and Robert Lindsteadt.

Following on from Wimbledon, Fleming remained in his partnership with Marray going into the American hardcourt season. The pair made their second final of the year at the BB&T Atlanta Open, where they lost to the French-Dutch duo of Édouard Roger-Vasselin and Igor Sijsling. They then lost in the opening round of the Citi Open the following week. As their ranking was too low to compete in the Rogers Cup, Fleming teamed up with fellow Scot and world number 2 singles player Andy Murray for the first time. The pair reached their first ever Masters Series final where they were beaten by Peya and Soares, the same partnership that Fleming had lost to in the Aegon International final.

At the US Open, Fleming returned to his usual partnership with Jonathan Marray. They were seeded 12th for the tournament but faced a tough opening match which they came through in three sets. Another win followed to set up a 3rd round clash with 6th seeds Rohan Bopanna and Édouard Roger-Vasselin. They came through in straight sets to reach the quarter-final and equal Fleming's best ever US Open performance which he had achieved two years previously. They faced top seeds Bob and Mike Bryan but narrowly lost out 6–7^{(7–9)}, 4–6.

Fleming then partnered Andy Murray in the Davis Cup World Group play-offs against Croatia. They pulled off a four set win against Ivan Dodig and Mate Pavić to help beat Croatia 4–1, and return to the World Group for the first time since 2008. This marked Fleming's eighth straight Davis Cup doubles victory.

In November, the Lawn Tennis Association announced a dramatic cut in elite player funding, with all financial support being withdrawn from Britain's doubles specialists and any singles players aged over 24, to reduce the number of supported players from 16 this year to just six in 2014.

=== 2014 ===
2014 saw Fleming resume his regular partnership with Ross Hutchins after the latter returned from his illness. They lost their opening match of the season at the Brisbane International and were also defeated at the Heineken Open, before finally claiming a win at the Australian Open where they defeated Marinko Matosevic and Michał Przysiężny.

In late January, Fleming and Dominic Inglot were called to the Great Britain Davis Cup squad for the World Group first round tie against the United States in San Diego; Britain, making their return to the World Group after a five-year absence. Andy Murray and James Ward had won their singles matches, so team captain Leon Smith, rested Andy Murray for the doubles. Fleming and Inglot had not played a competitive match together since a junior tournament in Corfu 13 years ago, and so the world-beating Bryan brothers, posted a four-set win 6–2, 6–3, 3–6, 6–1 against FlemIng/Inglot. Later, Andy Murray secured his second singles victory; Great Britain winning the tie 3–1, to reach the Davis Cup quarter-finals for the first time since 1986.

In April, Fleming, Andy Murray, James Ward and Dan Evans were selected for the World Group quarter final against Italy, with Ross Hutchins as reserve. Fleming and Andy Murray won 6–3, 6–2, 3–6, 7–5 to secure a 2–1 lead, but Great Britain eventually lost 2–3.

Fleming/Hutchins struggled to find form throughout the year but managed to turn things round in May by reaching the final of the BMW Open, where they were defeated by Jamie Murray and John Peers. Fleming then teamed up with Andre Sá to play the Aegon Trophy in early June, where they were narrowly defeated in the final by Chris Guccione and Rajeev Ram. He then partnered Marcin Matkowski to reach the quarterfinals of Aegon Championships, before resuming his partnership with Hutchins to make the semifinals of the Aegon International. They were then defeated in their opening match at Wimbledon, and Fleming also lost in the second round of the mixed doubles with fellow Scot Jocelyn Rae.

Fleming next competed at the MercedesCup in July with Mariusz Fyrstenberg, but they were defeated in the opening round.

In September, Ross Hutchins decided to quit the Tour, soon after his return following treatment for Hodgkin's Lymphoma. That prompted Fleming to team up with Jonny Marray.

=== 2015 ===
Colin Fleming and Jonny Marray were narrowly beaten in the doubles final at the Open 13 in Marseille. Looking for their first title together in their third final, Fleming and Marray went down 6–4 3–6 10–8 to Croatia's Marin Draganja and Henri Kontinen of Finland despite winning four more points.

Having failed to get the results they wanted, Fleming decided to split from Jonny Marray. Fleming said breaking the news to Marray, a good friend, had been hard. Fleming then teamed up with Eric Butorac for the first time at the ATP World Tour Nottingham event in June, eventually losing the semi-final against Chris Guccione and André Sá 6–2, 2–6, 9–11.

After the grass season, Butorac announced he would be teaming up with another American, Scott Lipsky. Fleming didn't know who he would be playing with next, but a quick conversation "on Whatsapp" sorted out a partnership with Treat Huey of the Philippines. Fleming said " "We messaged each other, figured out with our rankings we could get in together (to the US Open)".

The Bryan brothers, in their inaugural BB&T Atlanta Open appearance, defeated Fleming and Gilles Müller in the final, 4–6, 7–6(2), 10–4. Muller, who had just completed a semifinal Saturday with over five hours on court, eventually succumbed to his fatigue latter in the finals match.

At the US Open, Fleming/Huey beat fifth seeds Fabio Fognini & Simone Bolelli in the first round, Lleyton Hewitt & Sam Groth in the second round, and lost to Leonardo Mayer & João Sousa in the third round.

=== 2016 ===
For the first six months, Fleming mainly teamed up with Jonathan Erlich, their best achievement being finalists at the Marseilles Open in February. They also had semi final matches at the Bucharest ATP 250 and Queen's Club Championships.

Persistent rain at Wimbledon caused doubles matches to be restricted to best of three sets. In their last match together, Fleming/Erlich were beaten in the first round by Jamie Murray and Bruno Soares.

Fleming now partnered Mariusz Fyrstenberg, reaching the semi-final at the Szczecin Open in September.

A few days later, Fleming and his final doubles partner Scott Lipsky were semi finalists in the Moselle Open.

In October, Fleming/Lipsky played for the last time at the Stockholm Open winning their first round match, but being beaten in the next round, the quarter-finals.

=== 2017 ===
On 20 January 2017, Fleming announced his retirement from professional tennis to take up the new position of national coach for Tennis Scotland.

== Significant finals ==
=== Masters 1000 finals ===
==== Doubles: 1 (1 runner-up) ====
Result	Year	Championship	Surface	Partner	Opponents	Score
Loss	2013	Canadian Open	Hard	(United Kingdom) Andy Murray	(Austria) Alexander Peya (Brazil) Bruno Soares	4–6, 6–7^{(4–7)}

== ATP career finals ==
=== Doubles: 19 (8 titles, 11 runners-up) ===
Legend Grand Slam tournaments (0–0) ATP World Tour Finals (0–0) ATP World Tour Masters 1000 (0–1) ATP World Tour 500 Series (0–0) ATP World Tour 250 Series (8–10)	Finals by surface Hard (7–6) Clay (0–2) Grass (1–3) Carpet (0–0)

Result	W–L	Date	Tournament	Tier	Surface	Partner	Opponents	Score
Win	1–0	Sep 2009	Open de Moselle, France	250 Series	Hard (i)	(United Kingdom) Ken Skupski	(France) Arnaud Clément (France) Michaël Llodra	2–6, 6–4, [10–5]
Win	2–0	Nov 2009	St. Petersburg Open, Russia	250 Series	Hard (i)	(United Kingdom) Ken Skupski	(France) Jérémy Chardy (France) Richard Gasquet	2–6, 7–5, [10–4]
Loss	2–1	Jun 2010	Eastbourne International, United Kingdom	250 Series	Grass	(United Kingdom) Ken Skupski	(Poland) Mariusz Fyrstenberg (Poland) Marcin Matkowski	3–6, 7–5, [8–10]
Loss	2–2	Apr 2011	Grand Prix Hassan II, Morocco	250 Series	Clay	(Slovakia) Igor Zelenay	(Sweden) Robert Lindstedt (Romania) Horia Tecău	2–6, 1–6
Win	3–2	Oct 2011	St. Petersburg Open, Russia (2)	250 Series	Hard (i)	(United Kingdom) Ross Hutchins	(Russia) Mikhail Elgin (Russia) Alexander Kudryavtsev	6–3, 6–7^{(5–7)}, [10–8]
Win	4–2	Mar 2012	Delray Beach Open, United States	250 Series	Hard	(United Kingdom) Ross Hutchins	(Slovakia) Michal Mertiňák (Brazil) André Sá	2–6, 7–6^{(7–5)}, [15–13]
Win	5–2	Jun 2012	Eastbourne International, United Kingdom	250 Series	Grass	(United Kingdom) Ross Hutchins	(United Kingdom) Jamie Delgado (United Kingdom) Ken Skupski	6–4, 6–3
Loss	5–3	Jul 2012	Hall of Fame Tennis Championships, United States	250 Series	Grass	(United Kingdom) Ross Hutchins	(Mexico) Santiago González (United States) Scott Lipsky	6–7^{(3–7)}, 3–6
Loss	5–4	Sep 2012	Malaysian Open, Malaysia	250 Series	Hard (i)	(United Kingdom) Ross Hutchins	(Austria) Alexander Peya (Brazil) Bruno Soares	7–5, 5–7, [7–10]
Win	6–4	Jan 2013	Auckland Open, New Zealand	250 Series	Hard	(Brazil) Bruno Soares	(Sweden) Johan Brunström (Denmark) Frederik Nielsen	7–6^{(7–1)}, 7–6^{(7–2)}
Win	7–4	Feb 2013	Open 13, France	250 Series	Hard (i)	(India) Rohan Bopanna	(Pakistan) Aisam-ul-Haq Qureshi (Netherlands) Jean-Julien Rojer	6–4, 7–6^{(7–3)}
Loss	7–5	Jun 2013	Eastbourne International, United Kingdom (2)	250 Series	Grass	(United Kingdom) Jonathan Marray	(Austria) Alexander Peya (Brazil) Bruno Soares	6–3, 3–6, [8–10]
Loss	7–6	Jul 2013	Atlanta Open, United States	250 Series	Hard	(United Kingdom) Jonathan Marray	(France) Édouard Roger-Vasselin (Netherlands) Igor Sijsling	6–7^{(6–8)}, 3–6
Loss	7–7	Aug 2013	Canadian Open, Canada	Masters 1000	Hard	(United Kingdom) Andy Murray	(Austria) Alexander Peya (Brazil) Bruno Soares	4–6, 6–7^{(4–7)}
Loss	7–8	May 2014	Bavarian International, Germany	250 Series	Clay	(United Kingdom) Ross Hutchins	(United Kingdom) Jamie Murray (Australia) John Peers	4–6, 2–6
Loss	7–9	Feb 2015	Open 13, France	250 Series	Hard (i)	(United Kingdom) Jonathan Marray	(Croatia) Marin Draganja (Finland) Henri Kontinen	4–6, 6–3, [8–10]
Loss	7–10	Aug 2015	Atlanta Open, United States (2)	250 Series	Hard	(Luxembourg) Gilles Müller	(United States) Bob Bryan (United States) Mike Bryan	6–4, 6–7^{(2–7)}, [4–10]
Win	8–10	Oct 2015	Shenzhen Open, China	250 Series	Hard	(Israel) Jonathan Erlich	(Australia) Chris Guccione (Brazil) André Sá	6–1, 6–7^{(3–7)}, [10–6]
Loss	8–11	Feb 2016	Open 13, France (2)	250 Series	Hard (i)	(Israel) Jonathan Erlich	(Croatia) Mate Pavić (New Zealand) Michael Venus	2–6, 3–6

== Performance timelines ==
Key
W	F	SF	QF	#R	RR	Q#	P#	DNQ	A	Z#	PO	G	S	B	NMS	NTI	P	NH

(W) winner; (F) finalist; (SF) semifinalist; (QF) quarterfinalist; (#R) rounds 4, 3, 2, 1; (RR) round-robin stage; (Q#) qualification round; (P#) preliminary round; (DNQ) did not qualify; (A) absent; (Z#) Davis/Fed Cup Zonal Group (with number indication) or (PO) play-off; (G) gold, (S) silver or (B) bronze Olympic/Paralympic medal; (NMS) not a Masters tournament; (NTI) not a Tier I tournament; (P) postponed; (NH) not held; (SR) strike rate (events won / competed); (W–L) win–loss record.

=== Doubles ===
Tournament	2006	2007	2008	2009	2010	2011	2012	2013	2014	2015	2016	W-L
Grand Slam tournaments
Australian Open	A	A	A	A	2R	1R	3R	1R	2R	A	1R	4–6
French Open	A	A	A	A	2R	2R	A	1R	1R	1R	2R	3–6
Wimbledon	1R	A	A	1R	2R	QF	1R	3R	1R	2R	1R	7–9
US Open	A	A	A	A	1R	QF	3R	QF	1R	3R	1R	9–7
Win–loss	0–1	0–0	0–0	0–1	3–4	6–4	4–3	5–4	1–4	3–3	1–4	23–28
National representation
Summer Olympics	NH		A	Not Held			1R	Not Held			1R	0–2
Davis Cup	A	A	A	Z1	Z2	Z2	Z1	PO	QF	A	A	9–2
Win–loss	0–0	0–0	0–0	0–1	2–0	2–0	2–1	2–0	1–1	0–0	0–1	9–4
ATP World Tour Masters 1000
Indian Wells Masters	A	A	A	A	A	A	1R	QF	2R	A	1R	3–4
Miami Masters	A	A	A	A	A	A	2R	1R	1R	A	A	1–3
Monte-Carlo Masters	A	A	A	A	A	A	A	2R	A	A	A	1–1
Madrid Masters	A	A	A	A	A	A	A	A	A	A	A	0–0
Rome Masters	A	A	A	A	A	A	A	A	A	A	A	0–0
Canada Masters	A	A	A	A	A	A	A	F	A	A	A	4–1
Cincinnati Masters	A	A	A	A	A	A	1R	A	A	A	A	0–1
Shanghai Masters	NMS			A	A	A	SF	2R	A	A	A	4–2
Paris Masters	A	A	A	A	A	2R	2R	A	A	1R	A	2–3
Win–loss	0–0	0–0	0–0	0–0	0–0	1–1	5–5	8–5	1–2	0–1	0–1	15–15
Career statistics
	2006	2007	2008	2009	2010	2011	2012	2013	2014	2015	2016	Career
Finals	0	0	0	2	1	2	4	5	1	3	1	19
Titles	0	0	0	2	0	1	2	2	0	1	0	8
Overall win–loss	0–1	0–0	0–0	11–4	15–20	27–20	36–22	38–22	13–25	17–17	16–22	173–153
Win %	0%	–	–	73%	43%	57%	62%	63%	34%	50%	42%	53%
Year-end ranking	226	–	336	56	73	33	27	27	71	58	76	

=== Mixed doubles ===
Tournament	2009	2010	2011	2012	2013	2014	2015	2016	W-L
Australian Open	A	A	A	QF	A	2R	A	A	3–2
French Open	A	A	A	A	1R	1R	A	A	0–2
Wimbledon	2R	2R	3R	QF	1R	2R	1R	1R	8–8
US Open	A	A	A	QF	1R	A	A	A	2–2
Win–loss	1–1	1–1	2–1	7–3	0–3	2–3	0–1	0–1	13–14
