= 2011 Moselle Open =

2011 Open de Moselle
- Date: 17–23 September
- Edition: 9th
- Category: World Tour 250
- Draw: 28S / 16D
- Prize money: €398,250
- Location: Metz, France
- Venue: Parc des Expositions de Metz Métropole

Champions

Singles
- (France) Jo-Wilfried Tsonga

Doubles
- (United Kingdom) Jamie Murray / (Brazil) André Sá
- Open de Moselle

The 2011 Moselle Open was a men's tennis tournament played on indoor hard courts. It was the ninth edition of the Moselle Open, and was part of the ATP World Tour 250 Series of the 2011 ATP World Tour. It was held at the Parc des Expositions de Metz Métropole in Metz, France, from 17 September until 23 September 2011. Jo-Wilfried Tsonga won the singles title.

== Entrants ==
=== Seeds ===
Country	Player	Rank^{1}	Seed
FRA	Jo-Wilfried Tsonga	10	1
FRA	Richard Gasquet	15	2
UKR	Alexandr Dolgopolov	20	3
CRO	Ivan Ljubičić	29	4
FRA	Michaël Llodra	33	6
BEL	Xavier Malisse	46	6
GER	Philipp Kohlschreiber	48	7
LUX	Gilles Müller	49	8

- ^{1} Rankings are as of 12 September 2011.

=== Other entrants ===
The following players received wildcards into the singles main draw:

- (France) Arnaud Clément
- (France) Benoît Paire
- (France) Kenny de Schepper

The following players received entry from the qualifying draw:

- (France) Jonathan Dasnières de Veigy
- (France) Nicolas Renavand
- (France) Mathieu Rodrigues
- (Netherlands) Igor Sijsling

== Finals ==
=== Singles ===
(France) Jo-Wilfried Tsonga defeated (Croatia) Ivan Ljubičić, 6–3, 6–7^{(4–7)}, 6–3

- It was Tsonga's first title of the year, his first in two years and the sixth of his career.

=== Doubles ===
(United Kingdom) Jamie Murray / (Brazil) André Sá defeated (Czech Republic) Lukáš Dlouhý / (Brazil) Marcelo Melo, 6–4, 7–6(7)
