= 2012 Moselle Open =

- Date: 17–23 September
- Edition: 10th
- Category: World Tour 250
- Draw: 28S / 16D
- Prize money: €398,250
- Surface: Hard / indoor
- Location: Metz, France
- Venue: Parc des Expositions de Metz Métropole

Champions

Singles
- (France) Jo-Wilfried Tsonga

Doubles
- (France) Nicolas Mahut / (France) Édouard Roger-Vasselin
- Moselle Open

The 2012 Moselle Open was a men's tennis tournament played on indoor hard courts. It was the tenth edition of the Moselle Open, and part of the ATP World Tour 250 series of the 2012 ATP World Tour. It was held at the Parc des Expositions de Metz Métropole in Metz, France, from 17 September to 23 September 2012. Jo-Wilfried Tsonga won the singles title. First-seeded Jo-Wilfried Tsonga won the singles title.

== Singles main-draw entrants ==
=== Seeds ===
Country	Player	Rank^{1}	Seed
FRA	Jo-Wilfried Tsonga	7	1
GER	Philipp Kohlschreiber	18	2
ESP	Marcel Granollers	24	3
GER	Florian Mayer	25	4
ITA	Andreas Seppi	28	5
FIN	Jarkko Nieminen	39	6
FRA	Gaël Monfils	44	7
RUS	Nikolay Davydenko	48	8

- ^{1} Rankings are as of September 10, 2012.

=== Other entrants ===
The following players received wild cards into the singles main draw:

- (Russia) Nikolay Davydenko
- (France) Paul-Henri Mathieu
- (France) Albano Olivetti

The following players received entry from the singles qualifying draw:

- (France) Kenny de Schepper
- (France) Vincent Millot
- (France) Clément Reix
- (Germany) Mischa Zverev

The following players received entry as lucky losers:

- (Germany) Michael Berrer
- (Germany) Daniel Brands

=== Withdrawals ===
- (Germany) Benjamin Becker
- (Finland) Jarkko Nieminen (right thigh injury)

=== Retirements ===
- (Spain) Marcel Granollers (intercostal muscle pain)
- (Czech Republic) Jan Hájek (right wrist injury)

== Doubles main-draw entrants ==
=== Seeds ===
Country	Player	Country	Player	Rank^{1}	Seed
CRO	Ivan Dodig	BRA	Marcelo Melo	43	1
FRA	Nicolas Mahut	FRA	Édouard Roger-Vasselin	86	2
GER	Dustin Brown	GER	Christopher Kas	100	3
SWE	Johan Brunström	DNK	Frederik Nielsen	101	4

- Rankings are as of September 10, 2012

=== Other entrants ===
The following pairs received wildcards into the doubles main draw:

- (France) Pierre-Hugues Herbert / (France) Albano Olivetti
- (France) Vincent Millot / (France) Gaël Monfils

=== Retirements ===
- (France) Vincent Millot (foot injury)

== Finals ==
=== Singles ===
(France) Jo-Wilfried Tsonga defeated (Italy) Andreas Seppi, 6–1, 6–2

=== Doubles ===
(France) Nicolas Mahut / (France) Édouard Roger-Vasselin defeated (Sweden) Johan Brunström / (Denmark) Frederik Nielsen, 7–6(3), 6–4
