= Moselle Open =

Coordinates: 49.090°N 6.234°E

Defunct tennis tournament
- Founded: 2003; 22 years ago
- Location: Metz; France
- Venue: Les Arènes (2003–2010; 2014–2025); Parc des Expositions de Metz Métropole (2011–2013)
- Category: ATP International Series (2003–2008); ATP Tour 250 (2009–2025)
- Surface: Hard (indoor)
- Draw: 28S/32Q/16D
- Prize money: €562,815 (2023)
- Website: moselle-open.com

Current champions (2025)
- Singles: (United States) Learner Tien
- Doubles: (France) Quentin Halys (France) Pierre-Hugues Herbert

The Moselle Open (formerly Open de Moselle from 2003 to 2010) was a professional tennis tournament held in the city of Metz and played on indoor hardcourts. It was part of the ATP Tour 250 series of the ATP Tour from 2003 until 2025. The venue for the tournament was Les Arènes de Metz from 2014 to 2025 and was previously the Parc des Expositions de Metz Métropole (from 2011 to 2013).

The tournament did not feature in the non-finalized 2026 ATP calendar announced in 2025, after it was announced that Metz will no longer conduct an ATP tournament in 2026 and going forward. In 2025, the tournament was one of the three French events of the ATP Tour 250 series, along with the Open Occitanie and the Open 13.

== Past finals ==
=== Singles ===
Year	Champions	Runners-up	Score
2003	(France) Arnaud Clément	(Chile) Fernando González	6–3, 1–6, 6–3
2004	(France) Jérôme Haehnel	(France) Richard Gasquet	7–6^{(11–9)}, 6–4
2005	(Croatia) Ivan Ljubičić	(France) Gaël Monfils	7–6^{(9–7)}, 6–0
2006	(Serbia) Novak Djokovic	(Austria) Jürgen Melzer	4–6, 6–3, 6–2
2007	(Spain) Tommy Robredo	(United Kingdom) Andy Murray	0–6, 6–2, 6–3
2008	(Russia) Dmitry Tursunov	(France) Paul-Henri Mathieu	7–6^{(8–6)}, 1–6, 6–4
2009	(France) Gaël Monfils	(Germany) Philipp Kohlschreiber	7–6^{(7–1)}, 3–6, 6–2
2010	(France) Gilles Simon	(Germany) Mischa Zverev	6–3, 6–2
2011	(France) Jo-Wilfried Tsonga	(Croatia) Ivan Ljubičić	6–3, 6–7^{(4–7)}, 6–3
2012	(France) Jo-Wilfried Tsonga	(Italy) Andreas Seppi	6–1, 6–2
2013	(France) Gilles Simon	(France) Jo-Wilfried Tsonga	6–4, 6–3
2014	(Belgium) David Goffin	(Portugal) João Sousa	6–4, 6–3
2015	(France) Jo-Wilfried Tsonga	(France) Gilles Simon	7–6^{(7–5)}, 1–6, 6–2
2016	(France) Lucas Pouille	(Austria) Dominic Thiem	7–6^{(7–5)}, 6–2
2017	(Germany) Peter Gojowczyk	(France) Benoît Paire	7–5, 6–2
2018	(France) Gilles Simon	(Germany) Matthias Bachinger	7–6^{(7–2)}, 6–1
2019	(France) Jo-Wilfried Tsonga	(Slovenia) Aljaž Bedene	6–7^{(4–7)}, 7–6^{(7–4)}, 6–3
2020	Not held due to COVID-19 pandemic		
2021	(Poland) Hubert Hurkacz	(Spain) Pablo Carreño Busta	7–6^{(7–2)}, 6–3
2022	(Italy) Lorenzo Sonego	(Kazakhstan) Alexander Bublik	7–6^{(7–3)}, 6–2
2023	(France) Ugo Humbert	Alexander Shevchenko	6–3, 6–3
2024	(France) Benjamin Bonzi	(United Kingdom) Cameron Norrie	7–6^{(8–6)}, 6–4
2025	(United States) Learner Tien	(United Kingdom) Cameron Norrie	6–3, 3–6, 7–6^{(8–6)}

=== Doubles ===
Year	Champions	Runners-up	Score
2003	(France) Julien Benneteau (France) Nicolas Mahut	(France) Michaël Llodra (France) Fabrice Santoro	7–6^{(7–2)}, 6–3
2004	(France) Arnaud Clément (France) Nicolas Mahut	(Croatia) Ivan Ljubičić (Italy) Uros Vico	6–2, 7–6^{(10–8)}
2005	(France) Michaël Llodra (France) Fabrice Santoro	(Argentina) José Acasuso (Argentina) Sebastián Prieto	5–2, 3–5, 5–4^{(7–4)}
2006	(France) Richard Gasquet (France) Fabrice Santoro	(Austria) Julian Knowle (Austria) Jürgen Melzer	3–6, 6–1, [11–9]
2007	(France) Arnaud Clément (France) Michaël Llodra	(Poland) Mariusz Fyrstenberg (Poland) Marcin Matkowski	6–1, 6–4
2008	(France) Arnaud Clément (France) Michaël Llodra	(Poland) Mariusz Fyrstenberg (Poland) Marcin Matkowski	5–7, 6–3, [10–8]
2009	(United Kingdom) Colin Fleming (United Kingdom) Ken Skupski	(France) Arnaud Clément (France) Michaël Llodra	2–6, 6–4, [10–5]
2010	(Jamaica) Dustin Brown (Netherlands) Rogier Wassen	(Brazil) Marcelo Melo (Brazil) Bruno Soares	6–3, 6–3
2011	(United Kingdom) Jamie Murray (Brazil) André Sá	(Czech Republic) Lukáš Dlouhý (Brazil) Marcelo Melo	6–4, 7–6^{(9–7)}
2012	(France) Nicolas Mahut (France) Édouard Roger-Vasselin	(Sweden) Johan Brunström (Denmark) Frederik Nielsen	7–6^{(7–3)}, 6–4
2013	(Sweden) Johan Brunström (South Africa) Raven Klaasen	(France) Nicolas Mahut (France) Jo-Wilfried Tsonga	6–4, 7–6^{(7–5)}
2014	(Poland) Mariusz Fyrstenberg (Poland) Marcin Matkowski	(Croatia) Marin Draganja (Finland) Henri Kontinen	6–7^{(3–7)}, 6–3, [10–8]
2015	(Poland) Łukasz Kubot (France) Édouard Roger-Vasselin	(France) Pierre-Hugues Herbert (France) Nicolas Mahut	2–6, 6–3, [10–7]
2016	(Chile) Julio Peralta (Argentina) Horacio Zeballos	(Croatia) Mate Pavić (New Zealand) Michael Venus	6–3, 7–6^{(7–4)}
2017	(France) Julien Benneteau (France) Édouard Roger-Vasselin	(Netherlands) Wesley Koolhof (New Zealand) Artem Sitak	7–5, 6–3
2018	(France) Nicolas Mahut (France) Édouard Roger-Vasselin	(United Kingdom) Ken Skupski (United Kingdom) Neal Skupski	6–1, 7–5
2019	(Sweden) Robert Lindstedt (Germany) Jan-Lennard Struff	(France) Nicolas Mahut (France) Édouard Roger-Vasselin	2–6, 7–6^{(7–1)}, [10–4]
2020	Not held due to COVID-19 pandemic		
2021	(Poland) Hubert Hurkacz (Poland) Jan Zieliński	(Monaco) Hugo Nys (France) Arthur Rinderknech	7–5, 6–3
2022	(Monaco) Hugo Nys (Poland) Jan Zieliński	(United Kingdom) Lloyd Glasspool (Finland) Harri Heliövaara	7–6^{(7–5)}, 6–4
2023	(Monaco) Hugo Nys (Poland) Jan Zieliński	(Germany) Hendrik Jebens (Germany) Constantin Frantzen	6–4, 6–4
2024	(Netherlands) Sander Arends (United Kingdom) Luke Johnson	(France) Pierre-Hugues Herbert (France) Albano Olivetti	6–4, 3–6, [10–3]
2025	(France) Quentin Halys (France) Pierre-Hugues Herbert	(Argentina) Guido Andreozzi (France) Manuel Guinard	7–5, 6–3

== See also ==
- Lorraine Open – men's tournament (1979–1989) held in Nancy and Metz
