= 2009 Monte-Carlo Rolex Masters – Singles =

Singles
- 2009 Monte-Carlo Rolex Masters

Final
- Champion: (Spain) Rafael Nadal
- Runner-up: (Serbia) Novak Djokovic
- Score: 6–3, 2–6, 6–1

Details
- Draw: 56 (7 Q / 3 WC )
- Seeds: 16

Events
Singles	Doubles
- Monte-Carlo Rolex Masters

Four-time defending champion Rafael Nadal defeated Novak Djokovic in the final, 6–3, 2–6, 6–1 to win the singles tennis title at the 2009 Monte-Carlo Masters. The set Nadal lost in the final was the first he had dropped at the tournament since the 2006 final. In his first Monte-Carlo Masters as the top seed, Nadal extended his streak to 27 consecutive wins at this tournament.

== Seeds ==
The top eight seeds receive a bye into the second round.

1. (Spain) Rafael Nadal (champion)
2. (Switzerland) Roger Federer (third round)
3. (Serbia) Novak Djokovic (final)
4. (United Kingdom) Andy Murray (semifinals)
5. (Argentina) Juan Martín del Potro (second round)
6. (France) Gilles Simon (second round)
7. (Spain) Fernando Verdasco (quarterfinals)
8. (Russia) Nikolay Davydenko (quarterfinals)
9. (France) Gaël Monfils (first round)
10. (Spain) David Ferrer (third round)
11. (Spain) Tommy Robredo (second round)
12. (Argentina) David Nalbandian (third round)
13. (Switzerland) Stan Wawrinka (semifinals)
14. (Croatia) Marin Čilić (second round)
15. (Czech Republic) Radek Štěpánek (first round)
16. (Spain) Nicolás Almagro (first round)

== Draw ==
Key

- Q = Qualifier
- WC = Wild card
- LL = Lucky loser
- Alt = Alternate
- ITF = ITF entry
- PR = Protected ranking
- SR = Special ranking
- SE = Special exempt
- JE = Junior exempt
- JR = Junior Accelerator Programme entrant
- CO = College Accelerator Programme entrant
- NG = Next Gen Accelerator Program entrant
- w/o = Walkover
- r = Retired
- d = Defaulted

=== Finals ===
Quarterfinals
1	(Spain) Rafael Nadal	6	6
WC	(Croatia) Ivan Ljubičić	3	3
4	(United Kingdom) Andy Murray	7^{7}	6
8	(Russia) Nikolay Davydenko	6^{1}	4
7	(Spain) Fernando Verdasco	2	6	3
3	(Serbia) Novak Djokovic	6	4	6
Q	(Germany) Andreas Beck	2	4
13	(Switzerland) Stan Wawrinka	6	6

Semifinals
1	(Spain) Rafael Nadal	6	7^{7}
4	(United Kingdom) Andy Murray	2	6^{4}
3	(Serbia) Novak Djokovic	4	6	6
13	(Switzerland) Stan Wawrinka	6	1	3

Final
1	(Spain) Rafael Nadal	6	2	6
3	(Serbia) Novak Djokovic	3	6	1

=== Top half ===
==== Section 1 ====
First round
(Russia) I Kunitsyn	4	6	5
PR	(Argentina) JI Chela	6	2	7
(Russia) M Safin	6	7
WC	(Australia) L Hewitt	4	5
Q	(Ecuador) N Lapentti	6	1	6
15	(Czech Republic) R Štěpánek	3	6	3
9	(France) G Monfils	3	1
(Serbia) J Tipsarević	6	6
(Sweden) R Söderling	4	6	3
(Italy) S Bolelli	6	1	6
Q	(Belgium) K Vliegen	4	7^{7}	4
WC	(Croatia) I Ljubičić	6	6^{5}	6

Second round
1	(Spain) R Nadal	6	6
PR	(Argentina) JI Chela	2	3
(Russia) M Safin	6^{6}	6	6^{6}
Q	(Ecuador) N Lapentti	7^{8}	2	7^{8}
(Serbia) J Tipsarević	5	3
(Italy) S Bolelli	7	6
WC	(Croatia) I Ljubičić	4	6	6
5	(Argentina) JM del Potro	6	1	4

Third round
1	(Spain) R Nadal	6	6
Q	(Ecuador) N Lapentti	3	0
(Italy) S Bolelli	5	6^{2}
WC	(Croatia) I Ljubičić	7	7^{7}

Quarterfinals
1	(Spain) R Nadal	6	6
WC	(Croatia) I Ljubičić	3	3

==== Section 2 ====
First round
(Romania) V Hănescu	6	6
Q	(Spain) A Martín	2	3
Q	(Italy) F Fognini	1	6	6
(Czech Republic) T Berdych	6	3	3
Q	(Italy) F Cipolla	3	2
14	(Croatia) M Čilić	6	6
12	(Argentina) D Nalbandian	6	3	6
(France) P-H Mathieu	4	6	3
(Argentina) J Acasuso	6^{4}	6^{2}
(Spain) M Granollers	7^{7}	7^{7}
(Croatia) I Karlović	6	6
(France) F Serra	4	4

Second round
4	(United Kingdom) A Murray	6	6
(Romania) V Hănescu	3	2
Q	(Italy) F Fognini	6	6
14	(Croatia) M Čilić	2	0
12	(Argentina) D Nalbandian	4	6	6
(Spain) M Granollers	6	3	1
(Croatia) I Karlović	4	3
8	(Russia) N Davydenko	6	6

Third round
4	(United Kingdom) A Murray	7^{13}	6
Q	(Italy) F Fognini	6^{11}	4
12	(Argentina) D Nalbandian	4	7	3
8	(Russia) N Davydenko	6	5	6

Quarterfinals
4	(United Kingdom) A Murray	7^{7}	6
8	(Russia) N Davydenko	6^{1}	4

=== Bottom half ===
==== Section 3 ====
First round
(Latvia) E Gulbis	1	3
(Germany) P Kohlschreiber	6	6
(France) M Gicquel	3	6	7^{7}
(Argentina) E Schwank	6	1	6^{2}
(Spain) F López	2	3
10	(Spain) D Ferrer	6	6
16	(Spain) N Almagro	6^{6}	6	6^{5}
(Spain) A Montañés	7^{8}	4	7^{7}
WC	(Monaco) J-R Lisnard	6	6
(Belgium) C Rochus	2	2
(France) J Benneteau	4	4
Q	(Spain) Ó Hernández	6	6

Second round
7	(Spain) F Verdasco	6	6
(Germany) P Kohlschreiber	3	4
(France) M Gicquel	1	0
10	(Spain) D Ferrer	6	6
(Spain) A Montañés	6	6
WC	(Monaco) J-R Lisnard	2	4
Q	(Spain) Ó Hernández	1	2
3	(Serbia) N Djokovic	6	6

Third round
7	(Spain) F Verdasco	6	6
10	(Spain) D Ferrer	2	1
(Spain) A Montañés	1	7^{7}	0
3	(Serbia) N Djokovic	6	6^{4}	6

Quarterfinals
7	(Spain) F Verdasco	2	6	3
3	(Serbia) N Djokovic	6	4	6

==== Section 4 ====
First round
Q	(Germany) A Beck	1	7^{7}	6
(Germany) N Kiefer	6	6^{1}	4
(France) J Chardy	2	5
(Argentina) J Mónaco	6	7
(Germany) R Schüttler	1	4
11	(Spain) T Robredo	6	6
13	(Switzerland) S Wawrinka	6	6
(Serbia) V Troicki	2	3
(Russia) I Andreev	6	6^{5}	2
(Argentina) M Vassallo Argüello	2	7^{7}	6
(Italy) A Seppi	6	6
(Austria) J Melzer	2	0

Second round
6	(France) G Simon	5	1
Q	(Germany) A Beck	7	6
(Argentina) J Mónaco	6	6
11	(Spain) T Robredo	2	4
13	(Switzerland) S Wawrinka	2	7	6
(Argentina) M Vassallo Argüello	6	5	2
(Italy) A Seppi	4	4
2/WC	(Switzerland) R Federer	6	6

Third round
Q	(Germany) A Beck	3	6	7
(Argentina) J Mónaco	6	2	5
13	(Switzerland) S Wawrinka	6	7
2/WC	(Switzerland) R Federer	4	5

Quarterfinals
Q	(Germany) A Beck	2	4
13	(Switzerland) S Wawrinka	6	6

== Qualifying ==
=== Seeds ===
1. (Finland) Jarkko Nieminen (qualifying competition)
2. (France) Arnaud Clément (first round)
3. (Israel) Dudi Sela (first round)
4. (France) Nicolas Devilder (qualifying competition)
5. (Brazil) Thomaz Bellucci (first round)
6. (Spain) Óscar Hernández (qualified)
7. (Russia) Teymuraz Gabashvili (first round)
8. (Russia) Mikhail Youzhny (qualifying competition)
9. (Germany) Mischa Zverev (first round)
10. (Spain) Alberto Martín (qualified)
11. (Chile) Nicolás Massú (first round)
12. (Germany) Andreas Beck (qualified)
13. (Spain) Pablo Andújar (qualifying competition)
14. (Italy) Potito Starace (first round)

=== Qualifiers ===
1. (Italy) Flavio Cipolla
2. (Spain) Alberto Martín
3. (Italy) Fabio Fognini
4. (Germany) Andreas Beck
5. (Ecuador) Nicolás Lapentti
6. (Spain) Óscar Hernández
7. (Belgium) Kristof Vliegen

=== Draw ===
==== First qualifier ====
First round
1	(Finland) Jarkko Nieminen	6	6
(Ukraine) Sergiy Stakhovsky	4	3
(Italy) Flavio Cipolla	6	6
14/WC	(Italy) Potito Starace	4	1

Qualifying competition
1	(Finland) Jarkko Nieminen	4	3
(Italy) Flavio Cipolla	6	6

==== Second qualifier ====
First round
2	(France) Arnaud Clément	1	5
(Spain) Rubén Ramírez Hidalgo	6	7
(Kazakhstan) Andrey Golubev	3	3
10	(Spain) Alberto Martín	6	6

Qualifying competition
(Spain) Rubén Ramírez Hidalgo	1	3
10	(Spain) Alberto Martín	6	6

==== Third qualifier ====
First round
3	(Israel) Dudi Sela	4	7^{7}	3
(Belgium) Steve Darcis	6	6^{1}	6
(Italy) Fabio Fognini	6	6
11	(Chile) Nicolás Massú	4	4

Qualifying competition
(Belgium) Steve Darcis	6	1	1
(Italy) Fabio Fognini	3	6	6

==== Fourth qualifier ====
First round
4	(France) Nicolas Devilder	6	6
WC	(Monaco) Benjamin Balleret	4	2
(Spain) Iván Navarro	6^{7}	2
12	(Germany) Andreas Beck	7^{9}	6

Qualifying competition
4	(France) Nicolas Devilder	2	2
12	(Germany) Andreas Beck	6	6

==== Fifth qualifier ====
First round
5	(Brazil) Thomaz Bellucci	6	6^{3}	3
(Ecuador) Nicolás Lapentti	2	7^{7}	6
WC	(France) Josselin Ouanna	4	6	4
8	(Russia) Mikhail Youzhny	6	3	6

Qualifying competition
(Ecuador) Nicolás Lapentti	6	6
8	(Russia) Mikhail Youzhny	3	4

==== Sixth qualifier ====
First round
6	(Spain) Óscar Hernández	4	6	6
(Belgium) Olivier Rochus	6	2	2
WC	(Ukraine) Artem Smirnov	0	5
13	(Spain) Pablo Andújar	6	7

Qualifying competition
6	(Spain) Óscar Hernández	3	7^{7}	6
13	(Spain) Pablo Andújar	6	6^{5}	2

==== Seventh qualifier ====
First round
7	(Russia) Teymuraz Gabashvili	1	1
(Argentina) Pablo Cuevas	6	6
(Belgium) Kristof Vliegen	6	6
9	(Germany) Mischa Zverev	4	4

Qualifying competition
(Argentina) Pablo Cuevas	6	6^{5}	4
(Belgium) Kristof Vliegen	1	7^{7}	6
