= 2007 Hamburg Masters – Singles =

Tennis tournament

Singles
- 2007 Hamburg Masters

Final
- Champion: (Switzerland) Roger Federer
- Runner-up: (Spain) Rafael Nadal
- Score: 2–6, 6–2, 6–0

Details
- Draw: 56 (4WC/7Q/1SE/2PR)
- Seeds: 16

Events
Singles	Doubles
- Hamburg Masters

Roger Federer defeated Rafael Nadal in the final, 2–6, 6–2, 6–0 to win the singles tennis title at the 2007 Hamburg Masters. With the win, Federer ended Nadal's record streak of 81 consecutive wins on clay, the longest single-surface win streak in the Open Era. It was Nadal's first loss on clay in over two years. This was Nadal’s 17th clay court final, and it was also the first time he lost a clay court final.

Tommy Robredo was the defending champion, but lost in the second round to Nicolás Almagro.

== Seeds ==
A champion seed is indicated in bold text while text in italics indicates the round in which that seed was eliminated. The top 8 seeds received a bye into the second round.

1. (Switzerland) **Roger Federer** **(champion)**
2. (Spain) Rafael Nadal (final)
3. (Russia) Nikolay Davydenko (third round)
4. (Serbia) Novak Djokovic (quarterfinals)
5. (Chile) Fernando González (quarterfinals)
6. (Spain) Tommy Robredo (second round)
7. (Croatia) Ivan Ljubičić (third round)
8. (United States) James Blake (third round)
9. (United Kingdom) Andy Murray (first round, retired due to a wrist injury)
10. (Czech Republic) Tomáš Berdych (second round)
11. (France) Richard Gasquet (second round)
12. (Spain) David Ferrer (quarterfinals)
13. (Russia) Mikhail Youzhny (first round)
14. (Cyprus) Marcos Baghdatis (first round)
15. (Spain) Juan Carlos Ferrero (third round)
16. (Australia) Lleyton Hewitt (semifinals)

== Draw ==
Key

- Q = Qualifier
- WC = Wild card
- LL = Lucky loser
- Alt = Alternate
- ITF = ITF entry
- PR = Protected ranking
- SR = Special ranking
- SE = Special exempt
- JE = Junior exempt
- JR = Junior Accelerator Programme entrant
- CO = College Accelerator Programme entrant
- NG = Next Gen Accelerator Program entrant
- w/o = Walkover
- r = Retired
- d = Defaulted

=== Finals ===
Semifinals
1	(Switzerland) **Roger Federer**	4	**6**	**6**
(Spain) Carlos Moyà	**6**	4	2
16	(Australia) Lleyton Hewitt	**6**	3	5
2	(Spain) **Rafael Nadal**	2	**6**	**7**

Final
1	(Switzerland) **Roger Federer**	2	**6**	**6**
2	(Spain) Rafael Nadal	**6**	2	0

=== Section 1 ===
First round
Q	**(Argentina) J Mónaco**	**6**	**6**
(Slovakia) D Hrbatý	2	2
Q	(Chile) N Massú	6^{7}	4
**(Russia) M Safin**	**7^{9}**	**6**
(Switzerland) S Wawrinka	1	6^{5}
15	**(Spain) J C Ferrero**	**6**	**7^{7}**
12	(Spain) **D Ferrer**	**6**	3	**6**
(Sweden) J Björkman	4	**6**	2
**(Sweden) R Söderling**	4	**6**	**6**
(United States) R Ginepri	**6**	4	3
Q	(Italy) S Bolelli	**7^{7}**	3	3
Q	**(France) F Serra**	6^{3}	**6**	**6**

Second round
1	**(Switzerland) R Federer**	**6**	2	**6**
Q	(Argentina) J Mónaco	3	**6**	4
(Russia) M Safin	3	6^{15}
15	**(Spain) J C Ferrero**	**6**	**7^{17}**
12	**(Spain) D Ferrer**	1	**6**	**6**
(Sweden) R Söderling	**6**	3	2
Q	(France) F Serra	**6**	2	2
7	**(Croatia) I Ljubičić**	4	**6**	**6**

Third round
1	**(Switzerland) R Federer**	**6**	**6**
15	(Spain) J C Ferrero	2	3
12	**(Spain) D Ferrer**	**6**	**6**
7	(Croatia) I Ljubičić	3	3

Quarterfinals
1	**(Switzerland) R Federer**	**6**	4	**6**
12	(Spain) D Ferrer	3	**6**	3

=== Section 2 ===
First round
(France) **J Benneteau**	**7^{7}**	**6**
WC	(Germany) R Schüttler	6^{2}	2
WC	(Germany) T Summerer	1	6^{5}
(Finland) **J Nieminen**	**6**	**7^{7}**
**(Germany) F Mayer**	**6**	2	**7^{7}**
13	(Russia) M Youzhny	4	**6**	6^{5}
10	**(Czech Republic) T Berdych**	**7^{8}**	**6**
(Spain) F Verdasco	6^{6}	4
**(Spain) C Moyà**	**6**	**6**
(United States) M Fish	0	3
**(France) A Clément**	**6**	6^{4}	**6**
(Czech Republic) R Štěpánek	3	**7^{7}**	3

Second round
4	**(Serbia) N Djokovic**	**7^{7}**	**6**
(France) J Benneteau	6^{5}	3
**(Finland) J Nieminen**	**6**	**6**
(Germany) F Mayer	2	4
10	(Czech Republic) T Berdych	**6**	5	6^{6}
**(Spain) C Moyà**	3	**7**	**7^{8}**
(France) A Clément	2	3
8	**(United States) J Blake**	**6**	**6**

Third round
4	**(Serbia) N Djokovic**	**7**	4	**6**
(Finland) J Nieminen	5	**6**	4
**(Spain) C Moyà**	1	**6**	**6**
8	(United States) J Blake	**6**	3	3

Quarterfinals
4	(Serbia) N Djokovic	6^{4}	**6**	5
**(Spain) C Moyà**	**7^{7}**	4	**7**

=== Section 3 ===
First round
PR	(Netherlands) M Verkerk	1	3
**(Spain) N Almágro**	**6**	**6**
**(Argentina) J Acasuso**	**6**	**6**
Q	(Spain) G García López	3	4
SE	**(Italy) F Volandri**	1
9	(United Kingdom) A Murray	5^{r}
16	**(Australia) L Hewitt**	**6**	**6**
(Argentina) A Calleri	3	4
**(Argentina) J I Chela**	**6**	4	**6**
(Argentina) G Cañas	1	**6**	1
(France) M Gicquel	1	0
**(France) G Simon**	**6**	**6**

Second round
6	(Spain) T Robredo	**7^{7}**	2	4
**(Spain) N Almagro**	6^{1}	**6**	**6**
**(Argentina) J Acasuso**	3	**7^{7}**	**6**
SE	(Italy) F Volandri	**6**	6^{3}	3
16	**(Australia) L Hewitt**	**6**	**7^{7}**
(Argentina) J I Chela	2	6^{3}
(France) G Simon	**7^{7}**	4	5
3	**(Russia) N Davydenko**	6^{5}	**6**	**7**

Third round
**(Spain) N Almagro**	**6**	**6**
(Argentina) J Acasuso	2	3
16	**(Australia) L Hewitt**	**6**	2	**6**
3	(Russia) N Davydenko	4	**6**	4

Quarterfinals
(Spain) N Almagro	3	4
16	**(Australia) L Hewitt**	**6**	**6**

=== Section 4 ===
First round
(Belgium) O Rochus	1	6^{3}
Q	(France) **P-H Mathieu**	**6**	**7^{7}**
WC	(Germany) A Waske	3	4
(Austria) **J Melzer**	**6**	**6**
(Argentina) G Gaudio	1	4
11	(France) **R Gasquet**	**6**	**6**
14	(Cyprus) M Baghdatis	5	3
WC	(Germany) **P Kohlschreiber**	**7**	**6**
(Russia) D Tursunov	2	0^{r}
PR	(Russia) **I Andreev**	**6**	1
(Germany) B Becker	3	**7^{7}**	3
Q	(Spain) **Ó Hernández**	**6**	6^{2}	**6**

Second round
5	(Chile) **F González**	**7**	**6**
Q	(France) P-H Mathieu	5	4
(Austria) **J Melzer**	**6**	**6**
11	(France) R Gasquet	3	4
WC	(Germany) P Kohlschreiber	**7^{7}**	1	4
PR	(Russia) **I Andreev**	6^{3}	**6**	**6**
Q	(Spain) Ó Hernández	5	1
2	(Spain) **R Nadal**	**7**	**6**

Third round
5	(Chile) **F González**	3	**6**	**6**
(Austria) J Melzer	**6**	3	4
PR	(Russia) I Andreev	4	1
2	(Spain) **R Nadal**	**6**	**6**

Quarterfinals
5	(Chile) F González	4	4
2	(Spain) **R Nadal**	**6**	**6**

== Qualifying ==
=== Qualifying seeds ===
1. (France) **Paul-Henri Mathieu (qualified)**
2. (Argentina) **Juan Mónaco (qualified)**
3. (Belarus) Max Mirnyi (first round)
4. (France) Sébastien Grosjean (qualifying competition)
5. (Chile) **Nicolás Massú (qualified)**
6. (Spain) **Guillermo García López (qualified)**
7. (Belgium) Kristof Vliegen (first round, retired due to an ankle injury)
8. (Ecuador) Nicolás Lapentti (first round)
9. (Austria) Stefan Koubek (qualifying competition)
10. (United States) Michael Russell (qualifying competition)
11. (Russia) Teymuraz Gabashvili (qualifying competition)
12. (France) **Florent Serra (qualified)**
13. (Italy) **Simone Bolelli (qualified)**
14. (Spain) **Óscar Hernández (qualified)**

=== Qualifiers ===
1. (France) **Paul-Henri Mathieu**
2. (Argentina) **Juan Mónaco**
3. (France) **Florent Serra**
4. (Italy) **Simone Bolelli**
5. (Chile) **Nicolás Massú**
6. (Spain) **Guillermo García López**
7. (Spain) **Óscar Hernández**

=== Special exempt ===
1. (Italy) **Filippo Volandri** (reached the semifinals at Rome)

=== Qualifying draw ===
==== First qualifier ====
First round
1	**(France) Paul-Henri Mathieu**	**6**	4	**6**
WC	(Germany) Julian Reister	3	**6**	4
**(Czech Republic) Jan Hernych**	**6**	**6**
8	(Ecuador) Nicolás Lapentti	1	2

Qualifying competition
1	**(France) Paul-Henri Mathieu**	**6**	**6**
(Czech Republic) Jan Hernych	4	2

==== Second qualifier ====
First round
2	**(Argentina) Juan Mónaco**	**7**	**6**
(Denmark) Kristian Pless	5	4
(Germany) Michael Berrer	**6**	6^{2}	2
9	**(Austria) Stefan Koubek**	4	**7^{7}**	**6**

Qualifying competition
2	**(Argentina) Juan Mónaco**	**6**	**6**
9	(Austria) Stefan Koubek	2	2

==== Third qualifier ====
First round
3	(Belarus) Max Mirnyi	4	0
**(Peru) Luis Horna**	**6**	**6**
WC	(Germany) Mischa Zverev	**6**	2	0
12	**(France) Florent Serra**	2	**6**	**6**

Qualifying competition
(Peru) Luis Horna	3	3
12	**(France) Florent Serra**	**6**	**6**

==== Fourth qualifier ====
First round
4	**(France) Sébastien Grosjean**	2	**7**	**6**
(Latvia) Ernests Gulbis	**6**	5	2
WC	(Germany) Tobias Kamke	3	5
13	**(Italy) Simone Bolelli**	**6**	**7**

Qualifying competition
4	(France) Sébastien Grosjean	6^{7}	**6**	6^{4}
13	**(Italy) Simone Bolelli**	**7^{9}**	2	**7^{7}**

==== Fifth qualifier ====
First round
5	**(Chile) Nicolás Massú**	**6**	**7^{9}**
(Romania) Andrei Pavel	1	6^{7}
(Colombia) Alejandro Falla	3	**6**	4
10	**(United States) Michael Russell**	**6**	3	**6**

Qualifying competition
5	**(Chile) Nicolás Massú**	**6**	**7**
10	(United States) Michael Russell	4	5

==== Sixth qualifier ====
First round
6	**(Spain) Guillermo García López**	**6**	**6**
WC	(Germany) Matthias Bachinger	4	2
(Argentina) Mariano Zabaleta	**6**	2	1^{r}
11	**(Russia) Teymuraz Gabashvili**	2	**6**	5

Qualifying competition
6	**(Spain) Guillermo García López**	**6**	**7^{7}**
11	(Russia) Teymuraz Gabashvili	1	6^{4}

==== Seventh qualifier ====
First round
7	(Belgium) Kristof Vliegen	3	**7^{7}**	1^{r}
**(Italy) Andreas Seppi**	**6**	6^{4}	3
(Argentina) Carlos Berlocq	**6**	2	4
14	**(Spain) Óscar Hernández**	4	**6**	**6**

Qualifying competition
(Italy) Andreas Seppi	2	4
14	**(Spain) Óscar Hernández**	**6**	**6**
