= Óscar Hernández (tennis) =

Spanish tennis player (born 1978)

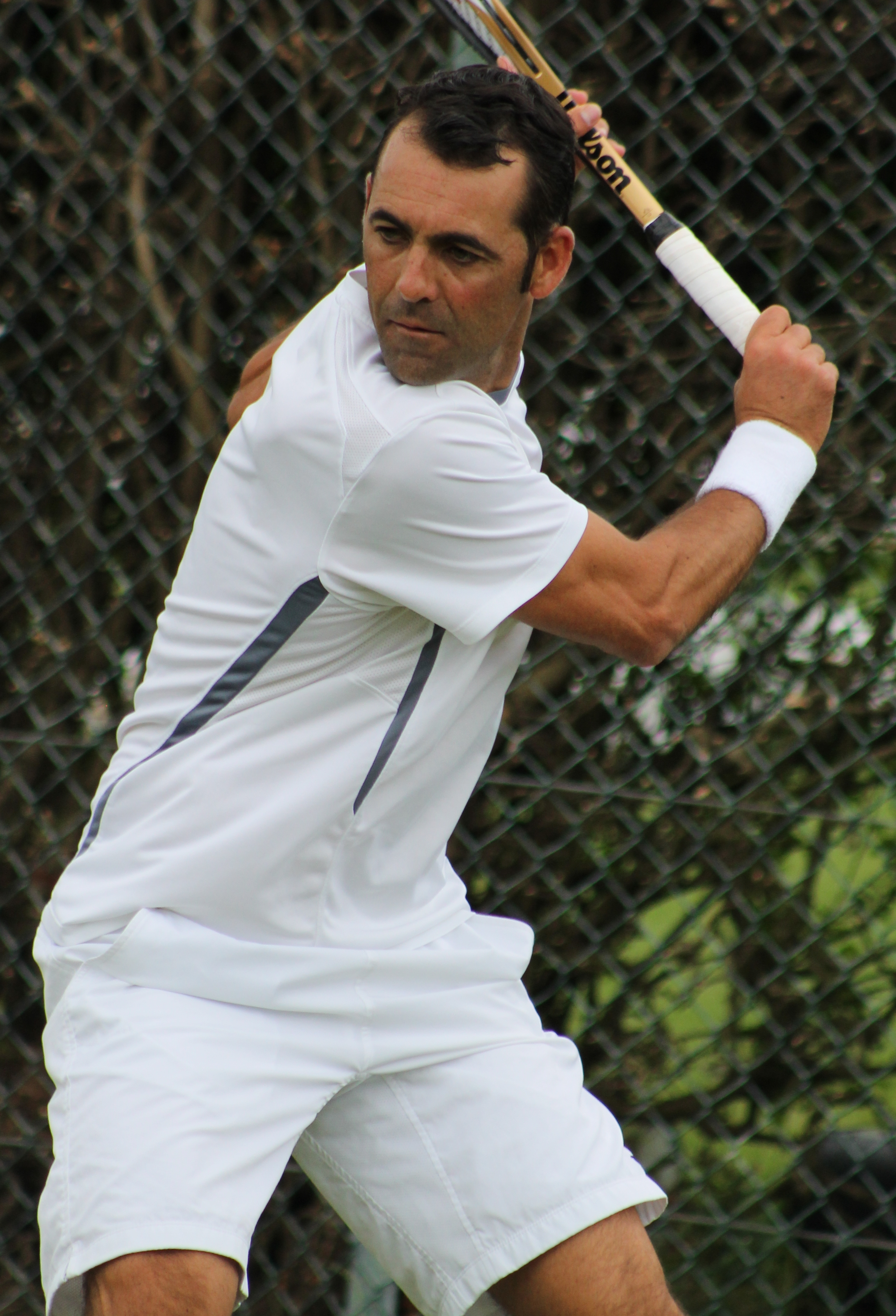
- Country (sports): Spain
- Residence: Barcelona, Spain
- Born: 10 April 1978 (age 47); Barcelona, Spain
- Height: 1.80 m (5 ft 11 in)
- Turned pro: 1998
- Retired: 2016
- Plays: Right-handed (one-handed backhand)
- Prize money: $1,943,856

Singles
- Career record: 65–125
- Career titles: 0
- Highest ranking: No. 48 (8 October 2007)

Grand Slam singles results
- Australian Open: 2R (2008)
- French Open: 3R (2007)
- Wimbledon: 1R (2004, 2005, 2007, 2008, 2009, 2010)
- US Open: 1R (2004, 2005, 2007, 2008, 2009)

Doubles
- Career record: 31–64
- Career titles: 1
- Highest ranking: No. 90 (27 September 2004)

Grand Slam doubles results
- Australian Open: 3R (2004)
- French Open: 1R (2005, 2008, 2009)
- Wimbledon: 1R (2007, 2008, 2009)
- US Open: 2R (2009)
- Last updated on: 28 March 2023.

Óscar Hernández Pérez (Spanish pronunciation: [ˈoskaɾ eɾˈnandeθ ˈpeɾeθ]; born 10 April 1978 in Barcelona, Spain) is a former professional male tennis player from Spain. He turned pro in 1998 and achieved his career-high singles ranking of World No. 48 in October 2007. Hernández scored an upset in the first round of the 2007 Rome Masters, when he defeated the World No. 20, Lleyton Hewitt, 3–6, 7–6^{(3)}, 6–1. Hernández announced his retirement from tennis on 22 July 2011.

== ATP Career Finals ==
=== Doubles: 2 (1 title, 1 runner-up) ===
Legend Grand Slam Tournaments (0–0) ATP World Tour Finals (0–0) ATP Masters Series (0–0) ATP Championship Series (0–0) ATP International Series (1–1)	Finals by surface Hard (0–0) Clay (1–1) Grass (0–0) Carpet (0–0)	Finals by setting Outdoors (1–1) Indoors (0–0)

Result	W–L	Date	Tournament	Tier	Surface	Partner	Opponents	Score
Loss	1–0	Sep 2004	Bucharest, Romania	International Series	Clay	(Argentina) José Acasuso	(Argentina) Lucas Arnold Ker (Argentina) Mariano Hood	6–7^{(5–7)}, 1–6
Win	1–1	Feb 2007	Viña del Mar, Chile	International Series	Clay	(Chile) Paul Capdeville	(Spain) Albert Montañés (Spain) Rubén Ramírez Hidalgo	4–6, 6–4, [10–6]

== ATP Challenger and ITF Futures finals ==
=== Singles: 21 (16–5) ===
Legend ATP Challenger (10–5) ITF Futures (6–0)	Finals by surface Hard (0–0) Clay (16–5) Grass (0–0) Carpet (0–0)

Result	W–L	Date	Tournament	Tier	Surface	Opponent	Score
Win	1–0	Aug 1999	Spain F5, Xàtiva	Futures	Clay	(Spain) Gabriel Trujillo Soler	6–3, 6–4
Win	2–0	Jul 2000	Spain F1, Alicante	Futures	Clay	(Spain) David Ferrer	2–6, 6–4, 7–5
Win	3–0	Sep 2001	Spain F11, Barcelona	Futures	Clay	(Serbia) Vladimir Pavicevic	6–3, 7–5
Win	4–0	Jan 2002	France F3, Feucherolles	Futures	Clay	(France) Marc Gicquel	6–4, 2–6, 6–4
Win	5–0	Sep 2002	Netherlands F2, Alphen aan den Rijn	Futures	Clay	(France) Florent Serra	6–4, 6–3
Win	6–0	Sep 2002	Spain F13, Oviedo	Futures	Clay	(Argentina) Carlos Berlocq	6–1, 6–3
Loss	6–1	Sep 2002	Maia, Portugal	Challenger	Clay	(Romania) Victor Hănescu	1–6, 6–3, 3–6
Win	7–1	May 2003	Birmingham, United States	Challenger	Clay	(United States) Alex Kim	6–3, 6–1
Loss	7–2	Jun 2003	Furth, Germany	Challenger	Clay	(Norway) Jan-Frode Andersen	6–2, 2–6, 2–6
Win	8–2	Sep 2003	Genoa, Italy	Challenger	Clay	(Italy) Vincenzo Santopadre	6–2, 6–2
Win	9–2	Sep 2003	Tehran, Iran	Challenger	Clay	(Switzerland) Jean-Claude Scherrer	4–6, 6–4, 6–3
Loss	9–3	Jul 2004	Montauban, France	Challenger	Clay	(Spain) Álex Calatrava	4–6, 6–1, 3–6
Win	10–3	Oct 2004	Seville, Spain	Challenger	Clay	(Germany) Alexander Waske	7–5, 3–6, 6–4
Win	11–3	Oct 2004	Barcelona, Spain	Challenger	Clay	(Spain) Santiago Ventura	6–2, 3–6, 5–1 ret.
Win	12–3	Nov 2004	Santiago, Chile	Challenger	Clay	(Ecuador) Nicolás Lapentti	7–6^{(7–4)}, 6–4
Win	13–3	Jun 2005	Braunschweig, Germany	Challenger	Clay	(Ecuador) Nicolás Lapentti	6–3, 6–3
Loss	13–4	Oct 2006	Barcelona, France	Challenger	Clay	(Spain) Marcel Granollers	4–6, 1–6
Win	14–4	Feb 2007	Florianópolis, Brazil	Challenger	Clay	(Argentina) Mariano Zabaleta	7–5, 7–6^{(8–6)}
Win	15–4	Jun 2007	Braunschweig, Germany	Challenger	Clay	(Germany) Florian Mayer	6–2, 1–6, 6–1
Loss	15–5	Aug 2008	Cordenons, Italy	Challenger	Clay	(Italy) Filippo Volandri	3–6, 5–7
Win	16–5	Jul 2009	Braunschweig, Germany	Challenger	Clay	(Russia) Teymuraz Gabashvili	6–1, 3–6, 6–4

=== Doubles: 22 (13–9) ===
Legend ATP Challenger (5–7) ITF Futures (8–2)	Finals by surface Hard (0–0) Clay (13–9) Grass (0–0) Carpet (0–0)

Result	W–L	Date	Tournament	Tier	Surface	Partner	Opponents	Score
Win	1–0	Jul 1999	Spain F3, Denia	Futures	Clay	(France) Julien Jeanpierre	(Australia) Tim Crichton (Australia) Todd Perry	6–2, 7–6^{(7–5)}
Loss	1–1	Jul 2000	Spain F1, Elche	Futures	Clay	(Spain) Marcos Roy-Girardi	(Spain) Santiago Ventura (Spain) Javier Pérez-Vazquez	6–7^{(5–7)}, 4–6
Win	2–1	Jul 2000	Spain F2, Alicante	Futures	Clay	(Spain) Marcos Roy-Girardi	(Spain) Marc López (Spain) A-J Martin Arroyo	3–6, 7–6^{(9–7)}, 6–4
Loss	2–2	Aug 2000	Sopot, Poland	Challenger	Clay	(Spain) Germán Puentes	(Argentina) Sergio Roitman (Argentina) Andrés Schneiter	4–6, 2–6
Loss	2–3	Aug 2001	Sopot, Poland	Challenger	Clay	(Russia) Dmitry Vlasov	(Poland) Marcin Matkowski (Poland) Bartlomiej Dabrowski	7–6^{(7–2)}, 4–6, 3–6
Loss	2–4	Sep 2001	Sofia, Bulgaria	Challenger	Clay	(Russia) Dmitry Vlasov	(Italy) Igor Gaudi (Italy) Stefano Galvani	4–6, 1–6
Win	3–4	Sep 2001	Spain F11, Barcelona	Futures	Clay	(Spain) Carlos Rexach-Itoiz	(Japan) Norikazu Sugiyama (Japan) Kentaro Masuda	6–2, 6–1
Win	4–4	Sep 2001	Spain F12, Barcelona	Futures	Clay	(Spain) Antonio Baldellou-Esteva	(Spain) Juan Giner (Moldova) Joan Jimenez-Guerra	3–6, 6–3, 7–6^{(8–6)}
Loss	4–5	Jan 2002	France F2, Angers	Futures	Clay	(Spain) Germán Puentes	(France) Stephane Huet (France) Thierry Ascione	6–4, 6–7^{(2–7)}, 2–6
Win	5–5	Apr 2002	Algeria F1, Algiers	Futures	Clay	(Italy) Matteo Colla	(Czech Republic) Jan Hájek (Czech Republic) Jan Mertl	6–2, 6–4
Win	6–5	May 2002	Turin, Italy	Challenger	Clay	(Romania) Victor Hănescu	(Uzbekistan) Vadim Kutsenko (Russia) Denis Golovanov	6–4, 6–3
Win	7–5	Jul 2002	Spain F5, Alicante	Futures	Clay	(Spain) Gabriel Trujillo Soler	(Spain) Santiago Ventura (Spain) Ivan Esquerdo	6–3, 6–3
Win	8–5	Sep 2002	Netherlands F2, Alphen aan den Rijn	Futures	Clay	(Argentina) Gustavo Marcaccio	(Netherlands) Melvyn op der Heijde (Netherlands) Melle van Gemerden	6–2, 6–3
Win	9–5	Jan 2003	France F3, Deauville	Futures	Clay	(Spain) Óscar Serrano	(China) Ran Xu (China) Zeng Shaoxuan	6–2, 6–1
Loss	9–6	Jul 2003	Scheveningen, Netherlands	Challenger	Clay	(Spain) Salvador Navarro	(Netherlands) Fred Hemmes (Netherlands) Edwin Kempes	6–3, 4–6, 3–6
Win	10–6	Oct 2003	Seville, Spain	Challenger	Clay	(Spain) Albert Portas	(Italy) Enzo Artoni (Argentina) Sergio Roitman	6–4, 4–6, 6–4
Loss	10–7	Sep 2004	Szczecin, Poland	Challenger	Clay	(Spain) Alberto Martín	(Argentina) Lucas Arnold Ker (Argentina) Mariano Hood	6–3, 4–6, 3–6
Loss	10–8	Oct 2004	Seville, Spain	Challenger	Clay	(Spain) Álex López Morón	(Germany) Tomas Behrend (Germany) Alexander Waske	6–7^{(0–7)}, 6–7^{(2–7)}
Win	11–8	Oct 2004	Barcelona, Spain	Challenger	Clay	(Spain) Gabriel Trujillo Soler	(Morocco) Mounir El Aarej (Spain) Marc Fornell Mestres	6–4, 7–5
Win	12–8	Jun 2005	Barcelona, Spain	Challenger	Clay	(Spain) Gabriel Trujillo Soler	(Spain) Albert Portas (Spain) Álex López Morón	7–5, 6–4
Loss	12–9	Jun 2007	Braunschweig, Germany	Challenger	Clay	(Spain) Carles Poch Gradin	(Germany) Tomas Behrend (Germany) Christopher Kas	0–6, 2–6
Win	13–9	Jun 2008	Braunschweig, Germany	Challenger	Clay	(Italy) Marco Crugnola	(Austria) Werner Eschauer (Austria) Philipp Oswald	7–6^{(7–4)}, 6–2

== Performance timeline ==
Key
W	F	SF	QF	#R	RR	Q#	DNQ	A	NH

(W) winner; (F) finalist; (SF) semifinalist; (QF) quarterfinalist; (#R) rounds 4, 3, 2, 1; (RR) round-robin stage; (Q#) qualification round; (DNQ) did not qualify; (A) absent; (NH) not held; (SR) strike rate (events won / competed); (W–L) win–loss record.

=== Singles ===
Tournament	2002	2003	2004	2005	2006	2007	2008	2009	2010	2011	2012	2013	2014	SR	W–L	Win%
Grand Slam tournaments
Australian Open	A	A	1R	1R	1R	A	2R	1R	1R	A	A	A	Q1	0 / 6	1–6	14%
French Open	Q1	Q3	1R	2R	2R	3R	2R	1R	1R	A	A	A	Q1	0 / 7	5–7	42%
Wimbledon	A	A	1R	1R	A	1R	1R	1R	1R	A	A	A	Q1	0 / 6	0–6	0%
US Open	A	A	1R	1R	A	1R	1R	1R	A	A	A	A	Q3	0 / 5	0–5	0%
Win–loss	0–0	0–0	0–4	1–4	1–2	2–3	2–4	0–4	0–3	0–0	0–0	0–0	0–0	0 / 24	6–24	20%
ATP Tour Masters 1000
Indian Wells	A	A	A	A	A	A	1R	1R	1R	A	A	A	A	0 / 3	0–3	0%
Miami	A	A	A	A	A	1R	2R	1R	A	A	A	A	A	0 / 3	1–3	25%
Monte Carlo	A	A	Q1	Q1	A	Q1	2R	2R	Q2	A	A	A	A	0 / 2	2–2	50%
Rome	A	A	Q1	Q1	A	2R	A	Q1	Q1	A	A	A	A	0 / 1	1–1	50%
Madrid	A	A	A	A	A	2R	A	2R	2R	A	A	A	A	0 / 3	1–3	25%
Hamburg	A	A	2R	Q1	A	2R	A	A	A	A	A	A	A	0 / 2	2–2	50%
Win–loss	0–0	0–0	1–1	0–0	0–0	2–4	1–3	3–4	0–2	0–0	0–0	0–0	0–0	0 / 14	7–14	33%

=== Doubles ===
Tournament	2004	2005	2006	2007	2008	2009	SR	W–L	Win%
Grand Slam tournaments
Australian Open	3R	A	A	A	1R	1R	0 / 3	2–3	40%
French Open	A	1R	A	A	1R	1R	0 / 3	0–3	0%
Wimbledon	A	A	A	1R	1R	1R	0 / 3	0–3	0%
US Open	A	A	A	1R	1R	2R	0 / 3	1–3	25%
Win–loss	2–1	0–1	0–0	0–2	0–4	1–4	0 / 12	3–12	20%
