= 2008 Mutua Madrileña Masters Madrid – Singles =

Singles
- 2008 Mutua Madrileña Masters Madrid

Final
- Champion: (United Kingdom) Andy Murray
- Runner-up: (France) Gilles Simon
- Score: 6–4, 7–6^{(8–6)}

Details
- Draw: 48 (2WC/6Q/1LL)
- Seeds: 16

Events
Singles	Doubles
← 2007 ·	Madrid Open	· 2009 →

Andy Murray defeated Gilles Simon in the final, 6–4, 7–6^{(8–6)} to win the singles tennis title at the 2008 Madrid Open. It was his second Masters title.

David Nalbandian was the defending champion, but lost in the third round to Juan Martín del Potro.

This was the last edition of the tournament to be held on indoor hard courts, as it would switch to outdoor clay courts the following year.

== Seeds ==
All seeds receive a bye into the second round.

1. (Spain) Rafael Nadal (semifinals)
2. (Switzerland) Roger Federer (semifinals)
3. (Serbia) Novak Djokovic (third round)
4. (United Kingdom) Andy Murray (champion)
5. (Russia) Nikolay Davydenko (second round)
6. (Spain) David Ferrer (second round)
7. (Argentina) David Nalbandian (third round)
8. (United States) Andy Roddick (third round)
9. (Argentina) Juan Martín del Potro (quarterfinals)
10. (Switzerland) Stanislas Wawrinka (third round)
11. (United States) James Blake (second round)
12. (Chile) Fernando González (second round)
13. (Spain) Fernando Verdasco (second round)
14. (Croatia) Ivo Karlović (quarterfinals)
15. (France) Richard Gasquet (third round)
16. (France) Jo-Wilfried Tsonga (third round)

== Draw ==
=== Finals ===
Quarterfinals
1	(Spain) Rafael Nadal	6	6
(Spain) Feliciano López	4	4
14	(Croatia) Ivo Karlović	6^{1}	6	6^{2}
(France) Gilles Simon	7	4	7
(France) Gaël Monfils	2	2
4	(United Kingdom) Andy Murray	6	6
9	(Argentina) Juan Martín del Potro	3	3
2	(Switzerland) Roger Federer	6	6

Semifinals
1	(Spain) Rafael Nadal	6	5	6^{6}
(France) Gilles Simon	3	7	7
4	(United Kingdom) Andy Murray	3	6	7
2	(Switzerland) Roger Federer	6	3	5

Final
(France) Gilles Simon	4	6^{6}
4	(United Kingdom) Andy Murray	6	7

=== Top half ===
==== Section 1 ====
First round
(Germany) N Kiefer	7	4	5
(Latvia) E Gulbis	5	6	7
Q	(Belgium) S Darcis	1	4
(United States) M Fish	6	6
(Germany) P Kohlschreiber	6	6
(Spain) C Moyá	2	2
(Spain) F López	7	6
WC	(Spain) Montañés	6^{4}	3

Second round
1	(Spain) R Nadal	7	3	6
(Latvia) E Gulbis	5	6	3
(United States) M Fish	7	4	3
15	(France) R Gasquet	6^{3}	6	6
10	(Switzerland) S Wawrinka	3	7	7
(Germany) P Kohlschreiber	6	5	6^{5}
(Spain) F López	6	7
6	(Spain) D Ferrer	4	6^{4}

Third round
1	(Spain) R Nadal	6	6
15	(France) R Gasquet	4	2
10	(Switzerland) S Wawrinka	4	4
(Spain) F López	6	6

Quarterfinals
1	(Spain) R Nadal	6	6
(Spain) F López	4	4

==== Section 2 ====
First round
(Russia) D Tursunov	6	2	3
Q	(Romania) V Hănescu	4	6	6
Q	(France) F Serra	3	4
(Sweden) R Söderling	6	6
(France) G Simon	4	6	7
(Russia) I Andreev	6	1	6^{7}
(France) M Llodra	4	4
Q	(United States) R Ginepri	6	6

Second round
3	(Serbia) N Djokovic	6^{8}	7^{8}	3
Q	(Romania) V Hănescu	7^{10}	6^{6}	1^{r}
(Sweden) R Söderling	6^{7}	6^{8}
14	(Croatia) I Karlović	7	7
11	(United States) J Blake	6	1	4
(France) G Simon	3	6	6
Q	(United States) R Ginepri	4	6	6
5	(Russia) N Davydenko	6	4	4

Third round
3	(Serbia) N Djokovic	6^{4}	6^{5}
14	(Croatia) I Karlović	7	7
(France) G Simon	6^{6}	6	7
Q	(United States) R Ginepri	7	4	6^{6}

Quarterfinals
14	(Croatia) I Karlović	6^{1}	6	6^{2}
(France) G Simon	7	4	7

=== Bottom half ===
==== Section 3 ====
First round
(Italy) A Seppi	6^{5}	6	3
(Spain) T Robredo	7	3	6
(France) G Monfils	6	6
WC	(Italy) F Fognini	2	4
Q	(Belgium) O Rochus	3	5
(Croatia) M Čilić	6	7
LL	(Italy) S Bolelli	7	6
(Spain) N Almagro	6^{4}	1

Second round
8	(United States) A Roddick	6	6
(Spain) T Robredo	3	4
(France) G Monfils	6	6
12	(Chile) F González	3	4
13	(Spain) F Verdasco	2	3
(Croatia) M Čilić	6	6
LL	(Italy) S Bolelli	0	1	r
4	(United Kingdom) A Murray	6	2

Third round
8	(United States) A Roddick	4	6	3
(France) G Monfils	6	3	6
(Croatia) M Čilić	5	6^{2}
4	(United Kingdom) A Murray	7	7

Quarterfinals
(France) G Monfils	2	2
4	(United Kingdom) A Murray	6	6

==== Section 4 ====
First round
(Germany) R Schüttler	1	2
(Czech Republic) T Berdych	6	6
(Russia) M Youzhny	5	6	2
(Finland) J Nieminen	7	3	6
(France) P-H Mathieu	4	4
Q	(Spain) M Granollers	6	6
(Argentina) J Mónaco	1	1
(Czech Republic) R Štěpánek	6	6

Second round
7	(Argentina) D Nalbandian	6	6^{5}	6
(Czech Republic) T Berdych	2	7	1
(Finland) J Nieminen	2	2	r
9	(Argentina) JM del Potro	6	4
16	(France) J-W Tsonga	3	6	7
Q	(Spain) M Granollers	6	3	6^{5}
(Czech Republic) R Štěpánek	3	6^{6}
2	(Switzerland) R Federer	6	7

Third round
7	(Argentina) D Nalbandian	4	2
9	(Argentina) JM del Potro	6	6
16	(France) J-W Tsonga	4	1
2	(Switzerland) R Federer	6	6

Quarterfinals
9	(Argentina) JM del Potro	3	3
2	(Switzerland) R Federer	6	6

== Qualifying ==
=== Qualifying seeds ===
1. (Serbia) Janko Tipsarević (first round)
2. (Italy) Simone Bolelli (qualifying competition, Lucky loser)
3. (Argentina) José Acasuso (qualifying competition)
4. (Croatia) Ivan Ljubičić (qualifying competition)
5. (Argentina) Agustín Calleri (first round)
6. (France) Julien Benneteau (qualifying competition)
7. (France) Florent Serra (qualified)
8. (Argentina) Eduardo Schwank (qualifying competition)
9. (Spain) Marcel Granollers (qualified)
10. (Belgium) Steve Darcis (qualified)
11. (Spain) Guillermo García López (first round)
12. (Argentina) Guillermo Cañas (qualifying competition)

=== Qualifiers ===
1. (United States) Robby Ginepri
2. (Belgium) Steve Darcis
3. (France) Florent Serra
4. (Spain) Marcel Granollers
5. (Belgium) Olivier Rochus
6. (Romania) Victor Hănescu

=== Lucky loser ===
1. (Italy) Simone Bolelli

=== Qualifying draw ===
==== First qualifier ====
First round
1	(Serbia) Janko Tipsarević	3	6	2
(United States) Robby Ginepri	6	3	6
WC	(Spain) Óscar Burrieza	6^{5}	4
8	(Argentina) Eduardo Schwank	7^{7}	6

Qualifying competition
(United States) Robby Ginepri	7^{7}	6
8	(Argentina) Eduardo Schwank	6^{2}	4

==== Second qualifier ====
First round
2	(Italy) Simone Bolelli	6	6
(Ecuador) Nicolás Lapentti	4	3
(France) Nicolas Devilder	4	6^{1}
10	(Belgium) Steve Darcis	6	7^{7}

Qualifying competition
2	(Italy) Simone Bolelli	6^{4}	6^{2}
10	(Belgium) Steve Darcis	7^{7}	7^{7}

==== Third qualifier ====
First round
3	(Argentina) José Acasuso	6	3	2
WC	(Spain) Pablo Andújar	3	6	0^{r}
WC	(Bulgaria) Grigor Dimitrov	3	3
7	(France) Florent Serra	6	6

Qualifying competition
3	(Argentina) José Acasuso	4	4
7	(France) Florent Serra	6	6

==== Fourth qualifier ====
First round
4	(Croatia) Ivan Ljubičić	6	7
(Australia) Chris Guccione	3	5
WC	(Spain) Carlos Gómez-Herrera	0	2
9	(Spain) Marcel Granollers	6	6

Qualifying competition
4	(Croatia) Ivan Ljubičić	5	5
9	(Spain) Marcel Granollers	7	7

==== Fifth qualifier ====
First round
5	(Argentina) Agustín Calleri	3	1
(Belgium) Olivier Rochus	6	6
(Luxembourg) Gilles Müller	6	2	4
12	(Argentina) Guillermo Cañas	4	6	6

Qualifying competition
(Belgium) Olivier Rochus	7	6
12	(Argentina) Guillermo Cañas	5	3

==== Sixth qualifier ====
First round
6	(France) Julien Benneteau	6^{4}	7^{7}	6
(Spain) Iván Navarro	7^{7}	6^{4}	3
(Romania) Victor Hănescu	6	7^{7}
11	(Spain) Guillermo García López	1	6^{2}

Qualifying competition
6	(France) Julien Benneteau	4	3
(Romania) Victor Hănescu	6	6
