= 2006 Australian Open – Men's singles =

Men's singles
- 2006 Australian Open

Final
- Champion: (Switzerland) Roger Federer
- Runner-up: (Cyprus) Marcos Baghdatis
- Score: 5–7, 7–5, 6–0, 6–2

Details
- Draw: 128
- Seeds: 32

Events
Singles	men	women		boys	girls
Doubles	men	women	mixed	boys	girls
WC Singles	men	women	quad
WC Doubles	men	women	quad
Legends	men	women	mixed
- Australian Open

Roger Federer defeated Marcos Baghdatis in the final, 5–7, 7–5, 6–0, 6–2 to win the men's singles tennis title at the 2006 Australian Open. It was his second Australian Open title and his seventh major title overall. It was his seventh victory in as many career major finals, an Open Era record. Baghdatis was the first Cypriot to reach a major final.

Marat Safin was the reigning champion, but withdrew due to injury.

This was the first main draw Australian Open appearance for future champion Stanislas Wawrinka and five time runner-up Andy Murray.

== Seeds ==
1. (Switzerland) Roger Federer (champion)
2. (United States) Andy Roddick (fourth round)
3. (Australia) Lleyton Hewitt (second round)
4. (Argentina) David Nalbandian (semifinals)
5. (Russia) Nikolay Davydenko (quarterfinals)
6. (Argentina) Guillermo Coria (third round)
7. (Croatia) Ivan Ljubičić (quarterfinals)
8. (Argentina) Gastón Gaudio (third round)
9. (Chile) Fernando González (first round)
10. (Sweden) Thomas Johansson (fourth round)
11. (Spain) David Ferrer (fourth round)
12. (Slovakia) Dominik Hrbatý (fourth round)
13. (United States) Robby Ginepri (second round)
14. (France) Richard Gasquet (first round)
15. (Spain) Juan Carlos Ferrero (third round)
16. (Spain) Tommy Robredo (fourth round)
17. (Czech Republic) Radek Štěpánek (second round)
18. (Croatia) Mario Ančić (third round)
19. (Czech Republic) Tomáš Berdych (second round)
20. (United States) James Blake (third round)
21. (Germany) Nicolas Kiefer (semifinals)
22. (France) Gaël Monfils (first round)
23. (Russia) Igor Andreev (third round)
24. (Belgium) Olivier Rochus (second round)
25. (France) Sébastien Grosjean (quarterfinals)
26. (Finland) Jarkko Nieminen (third round)
27. (United States) Taylor Dent (first round)
28. (Spain) Fernando Verdasco (second round)
29. (Italy) Filippo Volandri (first round, retired)
30. (Belarus) Max Mirnyi (third round)
31. (Spain) Feliciano López (third round)
32. (Spain) Carlos Moyá (first round)

== Draw ==
Key

- Q = Qualifier
- WC = Wild card
- LL = Lucky loser
- Alt = Alternate
- ITF = ITF entry
- PR = Protected ranking
- SR = Special ranking
- SE = Special exempt
- JE = Junior exempt
- JR = Junior Accelerator Programme entrant
- CO = College Accelerator Programme entrant
- NG = Next Gen Accelerator Program entrant
- w/o = Walkover
- r = Retired
- d = Defaulted

=== Finals ===
Quarterfinals
1	(Switzerland) Roger Federer	6	3	7^{9}	7^{7}
5	(Russia) Nikolay Davydenko	4	6	6^{7}	6^{5}
21	(Germany) Nicolas Kiefer	6	0	6	6^{1}	8
25	(France) Sébastien Grosjean	3	6	4	7^{7}	6
(France) Fabrice Santoro	5	0	0
4	(Argentina) David Nalbandian	7	6	6
7	(Croatia) Ivan Ljubičić	4	2	6	6	3
(Cyprus) Marcos Baghdatis	6	6	4	3	6

Semifinals
1	(Switzerland) Roger Federer	6	5	6	6
21	(Germany) Nicolas Kiefer	3	7	0	2
4	(Argentina) David Nalbandian	6	7	3	4	4
(Cyprus) Marcos Baghdatis	3	5	6	6	6

Final
1	(Switzerland) Roger Federer	5	7	6	6
(Cyprus) Marcos Baghdatis	7	5	0	2

=== Top half ===
==== Section 1 ====
Round 1
1	(Switzerland) R Federer	6	6	6
WC	(Uzbekistan) D Istomin	2	3	2
(South Korea) H-t Lee	4	1	6	4
(Germany) F Mayer	6	6	4	6
Q	(Sweden) J Adaktusson	6^{5}	3	2
(Italy) D Sanguinetti	7	6	6
(France) T Ascione	3	6	1	7	0
30	(Belarus) M Mirnyi	6	3	6	6^{4}	6
24	(Belgium) O Rochus	6	6	6
WC	(France) M Llodra	4	2	2
(Czech Republic) I Minář	6^{4}	6^{5}	4
WC	(Australia) P Luczak	7	7	6
(United States) P Goldstein	6	1	6	6
(Serbia and Montenegro) N Djokovic	2	6	3	2
(Germany) T Haas	6	7	6
14	(France) R Gasquet	2	5	2

Round 2
1	(Switzerland) R Federer	6	6	6
(Germany) F Mayer	1	4	0
(Italy) D Sanguinetti	5	3	6	6^{8}
30	(Belarus) M Mirnyi	7	6	4	7
24	(Belgium) O Rochus	7	4	1	7	1
WC	(Australia) P Luczak	6^{4}	6	6	6^{1}	6
(United States) P Goldstein	0	1	2
(Germany) T Haas	6	6	6

Round 3
1	(Switzerland) R Federer	6	6	6
30	(Belarus) M Mirnyi	3	4	3
WC	(Australia) P Luczak	6	3	4	4
(Germany) T Haas	4	6	6	6

Round 4
1	(Switzerland) R Federer	6	6	3	4	6
(Germany) T Haas	4	0	6	6	2

==== Section 2 ====
Round 1
12	(Slovakia) D Hrbatý	3	4	6	6	6
Q	(Austria) O Marach	6	6	2	1	3
Q	(United States) Z Fleishman	4	6^{6}	7	6	3
(Belgium) D Norman	6	7	5	0	6
Q	(Czech Republic) P Šnobel	4	6	2	4
(Netherlands) R Sluiter	6	2	6	6
(Spain) N Almagro	5	4	3
23	(Russia) I Andreev	7	6	6
29	(Italy) F Volandri	2	3	r
WC	(Australia) N Healey	6	6
(Italy) P Starace	5	7	3	6	3
WC	(United States) A Delic	7	6^{3}	6	3	6
Q	(Israel) H Levy	4	4	0
(United States) K Kim	6	6	6
(Croatia) I Karlović	5	6	6	5	3
5	(Russia) N Davydenko	7	4	3	7	6

Round 2
12	(Slovakia) D Hrbatý	6	7	5	4	10
(Belgium) D Norman	2	5	7	6	8
(Netherlands) R Sluiter	6	3	6^{4}	6	2
23	(Russia) I Andreev	3	6	7	2	6
WC	(Australia) N Healey	6	6^{4}	6	6
WC	(United States) A Delic	4	7	3	4
(United States) K Kim	6	0	3	2
5	(Russia) N Davydenko	4	6	6	6

Round 3
12	(Slovakia) D Hrbatý	1	6	6	2	6
23	(Russia) I Andreev	6	4	3	6	4
WC	(Australia) N Healey	2	7	4	5
5	(Russia) N Davydenko	6	5	6	7

Round 4
12	(Slovakia) D Hrbatý	6	6	4	2	3
5	(Russia) N Davydenko	4	4	6	6	6

==== Section 3 ====
Round 1
3	(Australia) L Hewitt	6	2	5	7	6
(Czech Republic) R Vik	4	6	7	6^{4}	3
(United Kingdom) A Murray	1	3	3
(Argentina) JI Chela	6	6	6
(Belgium) C Rochus	3	1	4
(Belgium) K Vliegen	6	6	6
(Denmark) K Carlsen	6^{5}	4	4
28	(Spain) F Verdasco	7	6	6
21	(Germany) N Kiefer	6^{5}	4	7	6	6
(Thailand) P Srichaphan	7	6	6^{5}	1	2
(Australia) W Arthurs	3	4	6	6^{2}
(Serbia and Montenegro) B Pašanski	6	6	4	7
(Italy) A Seppi	6	4	6	2	4
Q	(Serbia and Montenegro) J Tipsarević	1	6	4	6	6
(Czech Republic) T Zíb	5	0	2
15	(Spain) JC Ferrero	7	6	6

Round 2
3	(Australia) L Hewitt	4	4	7	2
(Argentina) JI Chela	6	6	6^{8}	6
(Belgium) K Vliegen	3	6	7	7
28	(Spain) F Verdasco	6	2	6^{4}	5
21	(Germany) N Kiefer	4	6	6	6
(Serbia and Montenegro) B Pašanski	6	1	4	1
Q	(Serbia and Montenegro) J Tipsarević	3	6	7	3	2
15	(Spain) JC Ferrero	6	3	5	6	6

Round 3
(Argentina) JI Chela	6	6	6
(Belgium) K Vliegen	1	4	4
21	(Germany) N Kiefer	6	6	5	6
15	(Spain) JC Ferrero	3	2	7	2

Round 4
(Argentina) JI Chela	6^{4}	3	3
21	(Germany) N Kiefer	7	6	6

==== Section 4 ====
Round 1
9	(Chile) F González	6	6^{6}	3	7	5
Q	(United States) A Bogomolov Jr.	4	7	6	6^{3}	7
(France) A Clément	3	6^{4}	3
(France) P-H Mathieu	6	7	6
(Argentina) C Berlocq	4	6^{3}	6	6^{4}
(Germany) B Phau	6	7	2	7
(Peru) L Horna	6	7	6
22	(France) G Monfils	4	5	1
25	(France) S Grosjean	6	6	6
WC	(Australia) M Philippoussis	4	2	3
(Monaco) J-R Lisnard	6	2	4	3
(Argentina) J Mónaco	4	6	6	6
(Costa Rica) JA Marín	1	4	5
LL	(Italy) F Luzzi	6	6	7
(Romania) V Hănescu	4	6	6	2	1
6	(Argentina) G Coria	6	1	4	6	6

Round 2
Q	(United States) A Bogomolov Jr.	0	6^{5}	2
(France) P-H Mathieu	6	7	6
(Germany) B Phau	3	2	1
(Peru) L Horna	6	6	6
25	(France) S Grosjean	6	6	6
(Argentina) J Mónaco	4	3	3
LL	(Italy) F Luzzi	6^{10}	4	3
6	(Argentina) G Coria	7	6	6

Round 3
(France) P-H Mathieu	7	7	6
(Peru) L Horna	6^{2}	6^{7}	1
25	(France) S Grosjean	6	6	3	6
6	(Argentina) G Coria	3	2	6	4

Round 4
(France) P-H Mathieu	5	2	2
25	(France) S Grosjean	7	6	6

=== Bottom half ===
==== Section 5 ====
Round 1
8	(Argentina) G Gaudio	6	5
(Romania) R Sabău	2	0	r
Q	(Germany) L Burgsmüller	3	6	7	6
(Germany) R Schüttler	6	3	6^{2}	3
(France) F Santoro	3	6	6	6
(United States) V Spadea	6	0	2	3
(Romania) A Pavel	6	7	4	3	6
32	(Spain) C Moyà	4	6^{5}	6	6	4
18	(Croatia) M Ančić	6	4	6	6
(Argentina) A Calleri	4	6	3	4
(Czech Republic) J Hernych	2	6	7	6
(Spain) F Vicente	6	3	6^{5}	2
(Italy) D Bracciali	6	7	6
Q	(Chinese Taipei) Y-h Lu	1	6^{4}	2
(France) F Serra	6	3	1	4
11	(Spain) D Ferrer	4	6	6	6

Round 2
8	(Argentina) G Gaudio	6	6	6
Q	(Germany) L Burgsmüller	3	2	3
(France) F Santoro	6	6	6
(Romania) A Pavel	4	1	4
18	(Croatia) M Ančić	6	6	6
(Czech Republic) J Hernych	1	4	4
(Italy) D Bracciali	4	4	7	2
11	(Spain) D Ferrer	6	6	6^{5}	6

Round 3
8	(Argentina) G Gaudio	3	2	7	6	4
(France) F Santoro	6	6	5	1	6
18	(Croatia) M Ančić	3	3	3
11	(Spain) D Ferrer	6	6	6

Round 4
(France) F Santoro	6	7	7
11	(Spain) D Ferrer	4	5	5

==== Section 6 ====
Round 1
16	(Spain) T Robredo	6	7	6
(Czech Republic) J Vaněk	4	6^{6}	3
(United Kingdom) T Henman	7	3	4	5
(Russia) D Tursunov	5	6	6	7
Q	(France) J-C Faurel	7	6	7
(Germany) A Waske	6^{5}	3	6^{2}
(Argentina) J Acasuso	2	3	6	6^{4}
20	(United States) J Blake	6	6	4	7
26	(Finland) J Nieminen	6	6	6
WC	(Australia) M Kimmich	2	3	1
(Argentina) M Zabaleta	2	5	1	r
(Chinese Taipei) Y-T Wang	6	7	4
(Switzerland) S Wawrinka	4	6	6	6
(Spain) A Montañés	6	2	3	0
Q	(Thailand) D Udomchoke	2	2	6	7	1
4	(Argentina) D Nalbandian	6	6	1	6^{4}	6

Round 2
16	(Spain) T Robredo	7	3	7	6
(Russia) D Tursunov	6^{4}	6	6^{5}	3
Q	(France) J-C Faurel	6	1	4	3
20	(United States) J Blake	2	6	6	6
26	(Finland) J Nieminen	6	7	6
(Chinese Taipei) Y-t Wang	2	6^{3}	2
(Switzerland) S Wawrinka	4	6	4	2
4	(Argentina) D Nalbandian	6	3	6	6

Round 3
16	(Spain) T Robredo	6	6	6
20	(United States) J Blake	3	4	4
26	(Finland) J Nieminen	6	3	2	5
4	(Argentina) D Nalbandian	2	6	6	7

Round 4
16	(Spain) T Robredo	3	0	6	2
4	(Argentina) D Nalbandian	6	6	2	6

==== Section 7 ====
Round 1
7	(Croatia) I Ljubičić	7	6	7
WC	(Australia) C Guccione	6^{5}	4	6^{3}
(Czech Republic) L Dlouhý	5	2	4
(Germany) P Kohlschreiber	7	6	6
(Brazil) R Mello	7	2	7	6^{4}	0
(Luxembourg) G Müller	5	6	6^{4}	7	6
(Germany) T Behrend	2	5	3
31	(Spain) F López	6	7	6
19	(Czech Republic) T Berdych	7	6	6^{2}	6
(United States) B Reynolds	5	3	7	1
Q	(France) G Simon	7	6	3	4	6
(Chile) N Massú	6^{6}	2	6	6	3
(Belgium) X Malisse	7	5	6	6
(Russia) M Youzhny	5	7	4	2
(France) C Saulnier	1	6^{3}	4
10	(Sweden) T Johansson	6	7	6

Round 2
7	(Croatia) I Ljubičić	7	6	6
(Germany) P Kohlschreiber	5	2	1
(Luxembourg) G Müller	2	4	7	4
31	(Spain) F López	6	6	6^{6}	6
19	(Czech Republic) T Berdych	3	2	6	2
Q	(France) G Simon	6	6	4	6
(Belgium) X Malisse	3	6	5	6	3
10	(Sweden) T Johansson	6	3	7	4	6

Round 3
7	(Croatia) I Ljubičić	7	7	6
31	(Spain) F López	5	6^{5}	0
Q	(France) G Simon	3	2	1
10	(Sweden) T Johansson	6	6	6

Round 4
7	(Croatia) I Ljubičić	6	6	6
10	(Sweden) T Johansson	2	4	4

==== Section 8 ====
Round 1
13	(United States) R Ginepri	6	6	6
(Austria) J Melzer	1	4	2
(Sweden) J Björkman	6	2	0	1
Q	(Germany) D Gremelmayr	3	6	6	6
(United States) J Gimelstob	6^{6}	5	0
(Cyprus) M Baghdatis	7	7	6
Q	(Sweden) B Rehnquist	1	2	2
17	(Czech Republic) R Štěpánek	6	6	6
27	(United States) T Dent	6^{4}	3	6^{4}
(Spain) G García-López	7	6	7
(Brazil) M Daniel	2	1	0	r
Q	(France) J Benneteau	6	6	3
(South Africa) W Moodie	3	7	6	6
(Spain) Ó Hernández	6	6^{5}	4	2
Q	(Switzerland) M Lammer	4	2	2
2	(United States) A Roddick	6	6	6

Round 2
13	(United States) R Ginepri	6	7	4	3	3
Q	(Germany) D Gremelmayr	2	5	6	6	6
(Cyprus) M Baghdatis	6	6	3	0	7
17	(Czech Republic) R Štěpánek	4	3	6	6	5
(Spain) G García-López	4	6^{3}	1
Q	(France) J Benneteau	6	7	6
(South Africa) W Moodie	5	3	2
2	(United States) A Roddick	7	6	6

Round 3
Q	(Germany) D Gremelmayr	2	1	2
(Cyprus) M Baghdatis	6	6	6
Q	(France) J Benneteau	1	2	2
2	(United States) A Roddick	6	6	6

Round 4
(Cyprus) M Baghdatis	6	1	6	6
2	(United States) A Roddick	4	6	3	4

Preceded by 2005 US Open – Men's singles	Grand Slam men's singles	Succeeded by 2006 French Open – Men's singles
