= Igor Andreev =

Russian tennis player

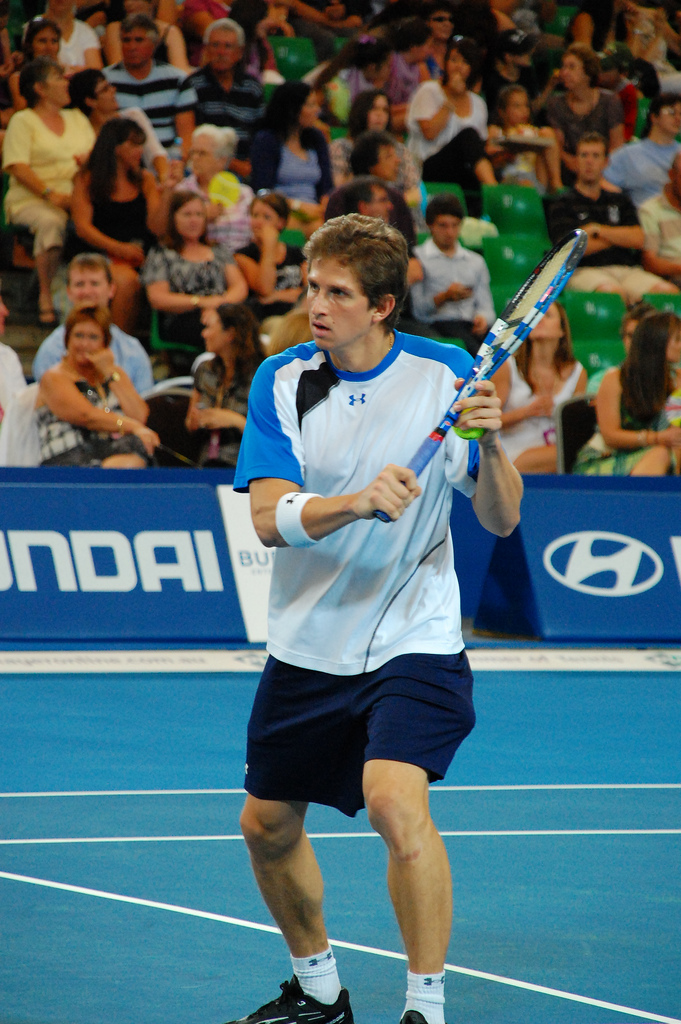
- Country (sports): Russia
- Residence: Moscow, Russia
- Born: 14 July 1983 (age 42) Moscow, Russian SFSR, Soviet Union
- Height: 1.85 m (6 ft 1 in)
- Turned pro: 2002
- Retired: 2013
- Plays: Right-handed (two-handed backhand)
- Prize money: $4,510,376

Singles
- Career record: 237–231
- Career titles: 3
- Highest ranking: No. 18 (3 November 2008)

Grand Slam singles results
- Australian Open: 3R (2006, 2008, 2009)
- French Open: QF (2007)
- Wimbledon: 4R (2009)
- US Open: 4R (2008)

Other tournaments
- Olympic Games: 3R (2004, 2008)

Doubles
- Career record: 59–83
- Career titles: 1
- Highest ranking: No. 59 (18 July 2005)

Grand Slam doubles results
- Australian Open: 2R (2004, 2005)
- French Open: 3R (2005)
- Wimbledon: 2R (2009)
- US Open: 2R (2004, 2005, 2008)

Team competitions
- Davis Cup: W (2006) (as player)
- Fed Cup: W (2020–21) (as captain)

Coaching career (2018–)
- Russia BJK Cup team (captain, Apr 2018—); Anastasia Potapova (Aug 2021—May 2024); Diana Shnaider (Jun 2024—Nov 2024); Ekaterina Alexandrova (Dec 2024—)

Coaching achievements
- Coachee singles titles total: 4
- List of notable tournaments (with champion) Singles: 1x WTA 500 Title (Bad Homburg) [— Shnaider]; 3x WTA 250 Titles (İstanbul and Litz) [— Potapova], (Budapest) [— Shnaider]
- Last updated on: 24 July 2024.

Igor Valeryevich Andreev (Russian: И́горь Вале́рьевич Андре́ев, BGN/PCGN: Andreyev, ISO 9: Andreev,; born 14 July 1983) is a Russian tennis coach and a former professional player. He won three ATP Tour singles titles, reached the quarterfinals of the 2007 French Open and achieved a career-high singles ranking of world No. 18 in November 2008.

== Tennis career ==
=== 2003 ===
Andreev made his ATP debut in September 2003 in Bucharest, Romania as a qualifier and defeated top seed Nikolay Davydenko 7–5, 6–7, 6–0 in the first round, before losing in the next round to José Acasuso.

At the Moscow ATP tournament later the same month, Andreev defeated the top seed Sjeng Schalken in straight sets, 6–3, 6–1, and made his first ATP quarterfinal appearance, eventually losing to Paul-Henri Mathieu 6–2, 3–6, 5–7. He entered the St. Petersburg tournament in October 2003 as a wildcard, and defeated fourth seed Max Mirnyi 6–4, 7–6 before losing to Sargis Sargsian in the second round.

=== 2004 ===
Andreev finished in the top 50 of the ATP rankings for the first time in his career. During the same year, he also reached two ATP finals: Gstaad, Switzerland in July (losing to Roger Federer), and Bucharest, Romania in September (losing to José Acasuso). He won a personal best 28 matches in the year, and made his Davis Cup debut.

Andreev made his Grand Slam debut at the 2004 Australian Open, where he lost in the first round to France's Olivier Patience, 4–6, 4–6, 7–6^{(4)}, 6–1, 6–2. At the French Open, he knocked out defending champion Juan Carlos Ferrero in the second round before losing to eventual champion Gastón Gaudio 6–4, 7–5, 6–3 in the fourth round.

He won his first ATP doubles title in Moscow in October 2004 with Nikolay Davydenko, defeating Mahesh Bhupathi and Jonas Björkman 3–6, 6–3, 6–4 in the final.

=== 2005: Three ATP titles ===
Andreev's first ATP singles title came in April 2005 in Valencia, Spain, beating Spaniard David Ferrer 6–3, 5–7, 6–3 in the final after having taken out Rafael Nadal in the quarterfinals. Andreev made the third round at both the French Open and Wimbledon, and reached the quarterfinal at the Pilot Pen Tennis Tournament in New Haven, Connecticut. He then reached the final of the event at Bucharest, losing to Florent Serra 6–3, 6–4.

Andreev continued his consistent performance of the year by winning the Palermo event in September 2005, beating Filippo Volandri of Italy 0–6, 6–1, 6–3 in the final, and the Kremlin Cup at Moscow in October, defeating Nicolas Kiefer 5–7, 7–6, 6–2 in the final.

=== 2006 ===
In the first half of the season, Andreev experienced seven first-round losses, and highlights included reaching the finals at Sydney and the quarterfinals at Indian Wells, losing both matches to James Blake. A knee injury forced Andreev to miss the second half of the clay court season, including Roland Garross.

=== 2007: First Grand Slam quarterfinal ===
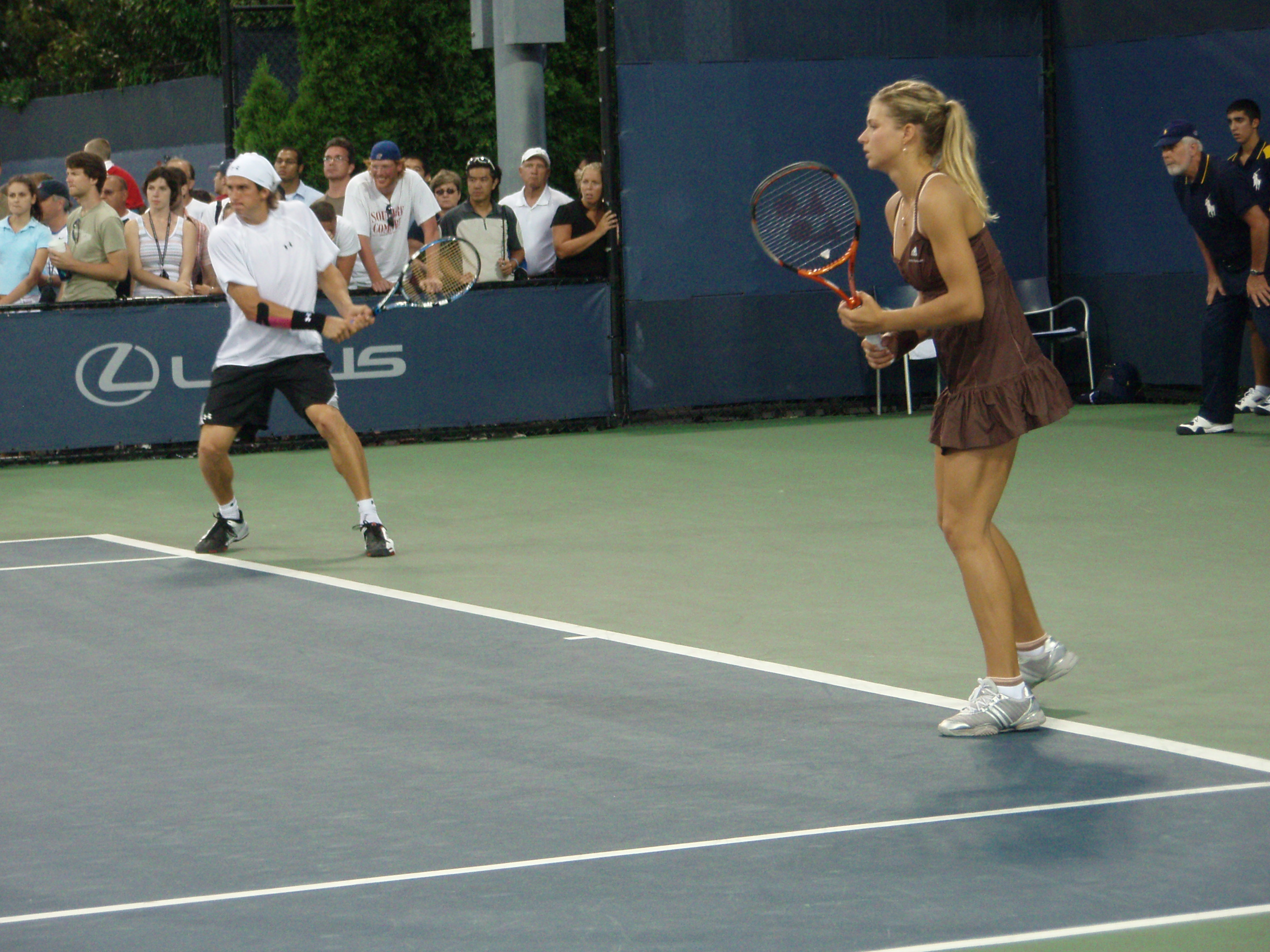
Andreev with his doubles partner Maria Kirilenko at the US Open

Andreev returned in 2007, and made an immediate impact with an impressive showing at the French Open. Unseeded, he beat former world no. 1 Andy Roddick 3–6, 6–4, 6–3, 6–4 in the first round, then Nicolás Massú, Paul-Henri Mathieu and Marcos Baghdatis in the fourth round to make his first Grand Slam quarterfinal, which he lost in straight sets to Novak Djokovic 6–3, 6–3, 6–3.

=== 2008: Best ranking, world no. 18 ===
Notable performances included reaching the quarterfinals of Buenos Aires, Dubai, Miami, and Monte Carlo.

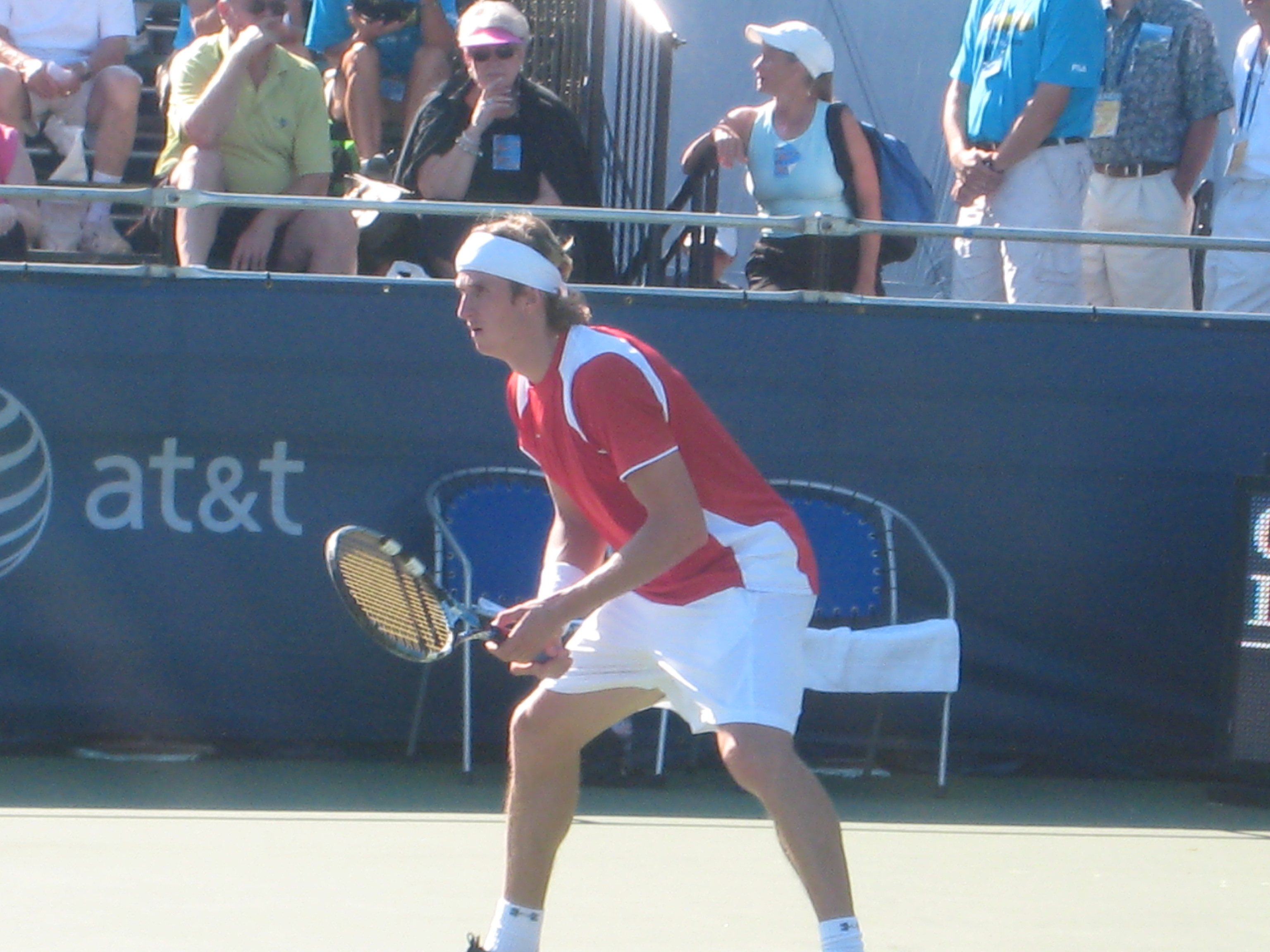
Andreev at the 2008 Pilot Pen Tennis tournament

=== 2009 ===
Heavily favored Russia was hosted by Israel in a Davis Cup quarterfinal tie in July 2009 on indoor hard courts at the Nokia Arena in Tel Aviv. Asked if he was nervous, Andreev replied with a smile: "Nervous? Why should I be nervous? Everything is fine." Harel Levy, world no. 210, then beat Andreev 6–4, 6–2, 4–6, 6–2 in the opening match. Dudi Sela (world no. 33) followed by beating Youzhny, and the next day Israelis Andy Ram and Jonathan Erlich beat Safin and doubles specialist Kunitsyn. With the tie clinched for Israel, best-of-three sets were played, with the outcomes of little to no importance. Dudi Sela hurt his wrist in the first set. Israel won 4–1.

=== 2010: Injuries and ranking downfall ===
After the Australian Open, Andreev played the 2010 Brasil Open, his first clay court tournament of the year. Seeded no. 4 in the tournament, Andreev made a run to the semifinals and eventually lost to Łukasz Kubot 6–2, 2–6, 4–6.

His next successful tournament was the Malaysia Open where he reached the semifinals, taking out defending champion Nikolay Davydenko on the way before falling to Mikhail Youzhny in three sets.

=== 2011–2013: Injuries and retirement ===
A knee injury thwarted Andreev in 2011, and in 2012 a shoulder injury prevented him from achieving decent results in almost every tournament. He lost ranking points and struggled to win a match in the qualifying round of small tournaments. The situation became worse in 2013. After not having played since the Monte-Carlo Rolex Masters in April, he lost in every first round match of the qualifying draw of every tournament he tried to play until the French Open 2013. At Wimbledon 2013 Andreev appeared in the main draw as a protected ranking player and in the first round he faced Polish Łukasz Kubot losing 6–1, 7–5, 6–2. Andreev announced his final retirement from tennis due to the multiple injuries that ruined his career after 2010 and 2011.

== Coaching career ==
He was the coach of Anastasia Potapova and Diana Shnaider. Since December 2024, he has been coaching Ekaterina Alexandrova.

== Playing style & equipment ==
Andreev is an offensive baseliner. He possessed one of the more powerful forehands on tour. ATP professional Marcos Baghdatis describes Andreev's forehand as being "more deadly than Nadal's" Andreev is sponsored by Sergio Tacchini for clothes and Babolat Aero Pro Drive GT for racquets and Babolat All-Court III for shoes.

== Personal life ==
He supports both FC Moscow and FC Dynamo Moscow and is an avid follower of the Russian national football team.

He was in a relationship with fellow Russian player Maria Kirilenko for several years, before they split in 2011.

== ATP career finals ==
=== Singles: 9 (3–6) ===
Legend Grand Slam tournaments (0–0) Year-end championships (0–0) ATP World Tour Masters 1000 (0–0) ATP World Tour 500 Series (0–0) ATP World Tour 250 Series (3–6)	Finals by surface Hard (0–1) Clay (2–5) Grass (0–0) Carpet (1–0)

Result	W/L	Date	Tournament	Surface	Opponent	Score
Loss	0–1	Jul 2004	Gstaad, Switzerland	Clay	(Switzerland) Roger Federer	2–6, 3–6, 7–5, 3–6
Loss	0–2	Sep 2004	Bucharest, Romania	Clay	(Argentina) José Acasuso	3–6, 0–6
Win	1–2	Apr 2005	Valencia, Spain	Clay	(Spain) David Ferrer	6–3, 5–7, 6–3
Win	2–2	Sep 2005	Palermo, Italy	Clay	(Italy) Filippo Volandri	0–6, 6–1, 6–3
Loss	2–3	Sep 2005	Bucharest, Romania	Clay	(France) Florent Serra	4–6, 3–6
Win	3–3	Oct 2005	Moscow, Russia	Carpet (i)	(Germany) Nicolas Kiefer	5–7, 7–6^{(7–3)}, 6–2
Loss	3–4	Jan 2006	Sydney, Australia	Hard	(United States) James Blake	2–6, 6–3, 6–7^{(3–7)}
Loss	3–5	Jul 2008	Gstaad, Switzerland	Clay	(Romania) Victor Hănescu	3–6, 4–6
Loss	3–6	Jul 2008	Umag, Croatia	Clay	(Spain) Fernando Verdasco	6–3, 4–6, 6–7^{(4–7)}

=== Doubles: 2 (1–1) ===
Legend Grand Slam tournaments (0–0) Year-end championships (0) ATP World Tour Masters 1000 (0–0) ATP World Tour 500 Series (0–0) ATP World Tour 250 Series (1–1)	Finals by surface Hard (0–0) Clay (0–0) Grass (0–0) Carpet (1–1)

Result	W/L	Date	Tournament	Surface	Partner	Opponents	Score
Win	1–0	Oct 2004	Moscow, Russia	Carpet (i)	(Russia) Nikolay Davydenko	(India) Mahesh Bhupathi (Sweden) Jonas Björkman	3–6, 6–3, 6–4
Loss	1–1	Oct 2005	Moscow, Russia	Carpet (i)	(Russia) Nikolay Davydenko	(Belarus) Max Mirnyi (Russia) Mikhail Youzhny	1–6, 1–6

== Performance timelines ==
Key
W	F	SF	QF	#R	RR	Q#	DNQ	A	NH

(W) winner; (F) finalist; (SF) semifinalist; (QF) quarterfinalist; (#R) rounds 4, 3, 2, 1; (RR) round-robin stage; (Q#) qualification round; (DNQ) did not qualify; (A) absent; (NH) not held; (SR) strike rate (events won / competed); (W–L) win–loss record.

=== Singles ===
Current till 2013 Wimbledon Championships.

Tournament	2004	2005	2006	2007	2008	2009	2010	2011	2012	2013	W–L
Grand Slam tournaments
Australian Open	1R	2R	3R	1R	3R	3R	1R	2R	Q2	A	8–8
French Open	4R	3R	A	QF	2R	3R	A	2R	1R	Q1	13–7
Wimbledon	2R	3R	A	1R	2R	4R	1R	2R	2R	1R	9–9
US Open	1R	2R	A	2R	4R	1R	2R	1R	1R	A	6–8
Win–loss	4–4	6–4	2–1	5–4	7–4	7–4	1–3	3–4	1–3	0–1	36–31
ATP World Tour Masters 1000
Indian Wells Masters	1R	1R	QF	A	1R	4R	2R	2R	Q1	A	6–7
Miami Masters	1R	3R	2R	1R	QF	3R	2R	2R	Q1	A	9–8
Monte-Carlo Masters	1R	1R	1R	3R	QF	1R	2R	A	A	Q1	6–7
Rome Masters	1R	1R	A	2R	3R	1R	1R	2R	A	Q1	4–7
Madrid Masters	A	A	A	1R	1R	A	1R	Q2	2R	Q1	1–4
Canada Masters	2R	1R	A	A	3R	2R	A	A	A	A	4–4
Cincinnati Masters	A	1R	A	Q2	3R	2R	A	Q2	Q1	A	3–3
Shanghai Masters	Not Masters Series					1R	Q1	A	A	A	0–1
Paris Masters	A	A	2R	A	2R	A	A	A	A	A	2–2
Hamburg Masters	A	1R	A	3R	1R	Not Masters Series					2–3
Win–loss	1–5	2–7	5–4	5–5	13–9	5–7	2–5	3–3	1–1	0–0	37–46
Career statistics
Titles–Finals	0–2	3–4	0–1	0–0	0–2	0–0	0–0	0–0	0–0	0–0	3–9
Year-end ranking	50	26	91	33	19	35	79	115	110	1013	

=== Doubles ===
Tournament	2004	2005	2006	2007	2008	2009	2010	2011	W–L
Grand Slam tournaments
Australian Open	2R	2R	1R	1R	A	1R	2R	A	3–6
French Open	2R	3R	A	1R	A	1R	A	A	3–4
Wimbledon	1R	A	A	1R	A	2R	A	A	1–3
US Open	2R	2R	A	A	2R	A	A	1R	3–4

== Top 10 wins ==
Season	2003	2004	2005	2006	2007	2008	2009	2010	2011	2012	2013	Total
Wins	0	3	1	1	4	1	0	1	0	0	0	11

#	Player	Rank	Event	Surface	Rd	Score
2004
1.	(Spain) Juan Carlos Ferrero	4	French Open, Paris, France	Clay	2R	6–4, 6–2, 6–3
2.	(United States) Andre Agassi	9	Queen's Club, London, United Kingdom	Grass	2R	4–6, 7–6^{(7–2)}, 7–6^{(7–3)}
3.	(Germany) Rainer Schüttler	8	Gstaad, Switzerland	Clay	SF	6–2, 3–6, 7–6^{(8–6)}
2005
4.	(Argentina) Mariano Puerta	10	Bucharest, Romania	Clay	QF	4–6, 6–1, 6–1
2006
5.	(United States) Andy Roddick	3	Indian Wells, United States	Hard	4R	6–4, 6–7^{(5–7)}, 6–1
2007
6.	(Chile) Fernando González	5	Davis Cup, La Serena, Chile	Clay	RR	4–6, 6–4, 6–3, 6–2
7.	(Chile) Fernando González	5	Monte Carlo, Monaco	Clay	2R	6–2, 2–6, 6–3
8.	(United States) Andy Roddick	3	French Open, Paris, France	Clay	1R	3–6, 6–4, 6–3, 6–4
9.	(France) Richard Gasquet	7	Gstaad, Switzerland	Clay	QF	7–5, 6–2
2008
10.	(France) Richard Gasquet	8	Dubai, United Arab Emirates	Hard	2R	6–3, 6–4
2010
11.	(Russia) Nikolay Davydenko	6	Kuala Lumpur, Malaysia	Hard (i)	2R	7–6^{(7–5)}, 5–7, 6–3

Awards and achievements
Preceded by (United States) Mardy Fish	ATP Comeback Player of the Year; 2007	Succeeded by (Germany) Rainer Schüttler
