= 2009 Sony Ericsson Open – Men's singles =

Men's singles
- 2009 Sony Ericsson Open

Final
- Champion: (United Kingdom) Andy Murray
- Runner-up: (Serbia) Novak Djokovic
- Score: 6–2, 7–5

Details
- Draw: 96 (12Q / 5WC)
- Seeds: 32

Events
Singles	men	women
Doubles	men	women
← 2008 ·	Sony Ericsson Open	· 2010 →

Andy Murray defeated Novak Djokovic in the final, 6–2, 7–5 to win the men's singles tennis title at the 2009 Miami Open.

Nikolay Davydenko was the reigning champion, but did not participate that year due to a left heel injury.

== Seeds ==
All seeds receive a bye into the second round.

1. (Spain) Rafael Nadal (quarterfinals)
2. (Switzerland) Roger Federer (semifinals)
3. (Serbia) Novak Djokovic (final)
4. (United Kingdom) Andy Murray (champion)
5. (United States) Andy Roddick (quarterfinals)
6. (Argentina) Juan Martín del Potro (semifinals)
7. (France) Gilles Simon (fourth round)
8. (Spain) Fernando Verdasco (quarterfinals)
9. (France) Gaël Monfils (fourth round)
10. (France) Jo-Wilfried Tsonga (quarterfinals)
11. (Spain) David Ferrer (fourth round)
12. (Chile) Fernando González (third round)
13. (United States) James Blake (third round)
14. (Argentina) David Nalbandian (second round)
15. (Spain) Tommy Robredo (third round)
16. (Switzerland) Stanislas Wawrinka (fourth round)
17. (Croatia) Marin Čilić (third round)
18. (Czech Republic) Radek Štěpánek (fourth round)
19. (Spain) Nicolás Almagro (second round)
20. (Russia) Igor Andreev (third round)
21. (Czech Republic) Tomáš Berdych (fourth round)
22. (Russia) Marat Safin (third round)
23. (Sweden) Robin Söderling (second round)
24. (France) ~~Richard Gasquet~~ (withdrew due to a shoulder injury)
25. (Russia) Dmitry Tursunov (third round)
26. (Croatia) Ivo Karlović (second round)
27. (United States) Mardy Fish (second round)
28. (Germany) Nicolas Kiefer (third round)
29. (Germany) Rainer Schüttler (third round)
30. (Austria) Jürgen Melzer (second round)
31. (France) Paul-Henri Mathieu (third round)
32. (Spain) Feliciano López (third round)

== Draw ==
=== Key ===
- Q = Qualifier
- WC = Wild card
- LL = Lucky loser
- Alt = Alternate
- SE = Special exempt
- PR = Protected ranking
- ITF = ITF entry
- JE = Junior exempt
- w/o = Walkover
- r = Retired
- d = Defaulted
- SR = Special ranking

=== Finals ===
Quarterfinals
1	(Spain) Rafael Nadal	4	6	6^{3}
6	(Argentina) Juan Martín del Potro	6	3	7^{7}
4	(United Kingdom) Andy Murray	6	6
8	(Spain) Fernando Verdasco	1	2
10	(France) Jo-Wilfried Tsonga	3	4
3	(Serbia) Novak Djokovic	6	6
5	(United States) Andy Roddick	3	6	4
2	(Switzerland) Roger Federer	6	4	6

Semifinals
6	(Argentina) Juan Martín del Potro	1	7	2
4	(United Kingdom) Andy Murray	6	5	6
3	(Serbia) Novak Djokovic	3	6	6
2	(Switzerland) Roger Federer	6	2	3

Final
4	(United Kingdom) Andy Murray	6	7
3	(Serbia) Novak Djokovic	2	5

=== Top half ===
==== Section 1 ====
First round
(Italy) S Bolelli	4	6	4
(Russia) T Gabashvili	6	4	6
Q	(Portugal) F Gil	7^{9}	6
(Germany) M Zverev	6^{7}	2
(Chinese Taipei) Y-h Lu	6	6
(Argentina) E Schwank	2	2
(Spain) G García López	6^{6}	1
(Italy) A Seppi	7^{8}	6

Second round
1	(Spain) R Nadal	6	6
(Russia) T Gabashvili	2	2
Q	(Portugal) F Gil	6	6
26	(Croatia) I Karlović	4	4
20	(Russia) I Andreev	7^{7}	6
(Chinese Taipei) Y-h Lu	6^{4}	3
(Italy) A Seppi	5	5
16	(Switzerland) S Wawrinka	7	7

Third round
1	(Spain) R Nadal	7	6
Q	(Portugal) F Gil	5	3
20	(Russia) I Andreev	6	3	3
16	(Switzerland) S Wawrinka	4	6	6

Fourth round
1	(Spain) R Nadal	7^{7}	7^{7}
16	(Switzerland) S Wawrinka	6^{2}	6^{4}

==== Section 2 ====
First round
(Ukraine) S Stakhovsky	4	4
Q	(United States) J Isner	6	6
Q	(United States) A Delić	6	7^{7}
(Belgium) S Darcis	4	6^{2}
(Argentina) J Acasuso	4	6	3
(Serbia) J Tipsarević	6	4	6
(Italy) P Starace	6^{9}	4
(Argentina) M Vassallo Argüello	7^{11}	6

Second round
11	(Spain) D Ferrer	6	3	6
Q	(United States) J Isner	3	6	2
Q	(United States) A Delić	3	7^{9}	3
17	(Croatia) M Čilić	6	6^{7}	6
30	(Austria) J Melzer	4	3
(Serbia) J Tipsarević	6	6
(Argentina) M Vassallo Argüello	2	2
6	(Argentina) JM del Potro	6	6

Third round
11	(Spain) D Ferrer	3	6	6
17	(Croatia) M Čilić	6	3	4
(Serbia) J Tipsarević	4	1
6	(Argentina) JM del Potro	6	6

Fourth round
11	(Spain) D Ferrer	3	2
6	(Argentina) JM del Potro	6	6

==== Section 3 ====
First round
(France) M Gicquel	0	4
(Argentina) J Mónaco	6	6
WC	(United States) R Sweeting	4	6^{2}
(Chile) N Massú	6	7^{7}
PR	(Austria) S Koubek	4	6^{2}
(Spain) A Montañés	6	7^{7}
(Serbia) V Troicki	6	6
(France) N Devilder	2	3

Second round
4	(United Kingdom) A Murray	4	6	6
(Argentina) J Mónaco	6	3	2
(Chile) N Massú	5	7^{7}	6
27	(United States) M Fish	7	6^{4}	2
LL	(Germany) B Phau	6	2
(Spain) A Montañés	4	0	r
(Serbia) V Troicki	6	6
14	(Argentina) D Nalbandian	1	3

Third round
4	(United Kingdom) A Murray	6	6
(Chile) N Massú	4	4
LL	(Germany) B Phau	4	3
(Serbia) V Troicki	6	6

Fourth round
4	(United Kingdom) A Murray	6	6
(Serbia) V Troicki	1	0

==== Section 4 ====
First round
(Russia) I Kunitsyn	7^{7}	5	6
(Argentina) G Cañas	6^{2}	7	3
PR	(Argentina) JI Chela	6	5	4
(United States) B Reynolds	0	7	6
(Luxembourg) G Müller	4	3
(United States) S Querrey	6	6
Q	(Germany) B Becker	6	6
WC	(United States) J Levine	4	3

Second round
12	(Chile) F González	6	6
(Russia) I Kunitsyn	4	4
(United States) B Reynolds	5	7^{7}	2
18	(Czech Republic) R Štěpánek	7	6^{3}	6
32	(Spain) F López	6^{5}	7	6
(United States) S Querrey	7^{7}	5	2
Q	(Germany) B Becker	3	4
8	(Spain) F Verdasco	6	6

Third round
12	(Chile) F González	6^{1}	4
18	(Czech Republic) R Štěpánek	7^{7}	6
32	(Spain) F López	6	3	4
8	(Spain) F Verdasco	3	6	6

Fourth round
18	(Czech Republic) R Štěpánek	2	2
8	(Spain) F Verdasco	6	6

=== Bottom half ===
==== Section 5 ====
First round
LL	(Israel) D Sela	6	4	3
WC	(Australia) L Hewitt	3	6	6
(Finland) J Nieminen	6	6
(Spain) I Navarro	3	3
(France) A Clément	3	6^{5}
Q	(United States) R Kendrick	6	7^{7}
(Argentina) A Calleri	6	3	6
(Belgium) C Rochus	4	6	3

Second round
7	(France) G Simon	6	6
WC	(Australia) L Hewitt	1	2
(Finland) J Nieminen	6	2	3
29	(Germany) R Schüttler	4	6	6
23	(Sweden) R Söderling	4	2
Q	(United States) R Kendrick	6	6
(Argentina) A Calleri	1	1
10	(France) J-W Tsonga	6	6

Third round
7	(France) G Simon	3	6	6
29	(Germany) R Schüttler	6	1	1
Q	(United States) R Kendrick	5	4
10	(France) J-W Tsonga	7	6

Fourth round
7	(France) G Simon	7^{7}	3	2
10	(France) J-W Tsonga	6^{4}	6	6

==== Section 6 ====
First round
(France) J Benneteau	3	6	6
(France) F Serra	6	3	3
(Russia) M Youzhny	6	3	6
(France) J Chardy	4	6	3
(Latvia) E Gulbis	2	2
(Cyprus) M Baghdatis	6	6
(Germany) P Kohlschreiber	4	6^{2}
Q	(Canada) F Dancevic	6	7^{7}

Second round
13	(United States) J Blake	6	6
(France) J Benneteau	4	4
(Russia) M Youzhny	3	6	4
21	(Czech Republic) T Berdych	6	3	6
31	(France) P-H Mathieu	6	2	6
(Cyprus) M Baghdatis	3	6	2
Q	(Canada) F Dancevic	3	2
3	(Serbia) N Djokovic	6	6

Third round
13	(United States) J Blake	4	7^{7}	3
21	(Czech Republic) T Berdych	6	6^{3}	6
31	(France) P-H Mathieu	4	1
3	(Serbia) N Djokovic	6	6

Fourth round
21	(Czech Republic) T Berdych	3	2
3	(Serbia) N Djokovic	6	6

==== Section 7 ====
First round
(Argentina) D Junqueira	6	6
WC	(India) Y Bhambri	4	3
Q	(Kazakhstan) M Kukushkin	6	6
(Germany) T Haas	4	4
(Croatia) I Ljubičić	4	4
(Spain) Ó Hernández	6	6
(Romania) V Hănescu	6^{4}	3
Q	(United States) M Russell	7^{7}	6

Second round
5	(United States) A Roddick	6	6
(Argentina) D Junqueira	1	1
Q	(Kazakhstan) M Kukushkin	6	6^{4}	3
25	(Russia) D Tursunov	3	7^{7}	6
22	(Russia) M Safin	6	2	6
(Spain) Ó Hernández	4	6	1
Q	(United States) M Russell	2	7^{7}	3
9	(France) G Monfils	6	6^{5}	6

Third round
5	(United States) A Roddick	7^{11}	6
25	(Russia) D Tursunov	6^{9}	2
22	(Russia) M Safin	7	5	6^{3}
9	(France) G Monfils	5	7	7^{7}

Fourth round
5	(United States) A Roddick	7^{7}	6
9	(France) G Monfils	6^{2}	4

==== Section 8 ====
First round
WC	(United States) B Evans	4	3
(Czech Republic) J Hernych	6	6
Q	(United States) T Dent	6	6
Q	(Brazil) R Mello	1	3
Q	(Brazil) T Bellucci	4	6	1
(France) F Santoro	6	4	6
Q	(United States) K Kim	3
(France) M Llodra	6	r

Second round
15	(Spain) T Robredo	6	6
(Czech Republic) J Hernych	4	4
Q	(United States) T Dent	2	6	7^{9}
19	(Spain) N Almagro	6	2	6^{7}
28	(Germany) N Kiefer	5	7^{7}	6
(France) F Santoro	7	6^{5}	2
Q	(United States) K Kim	3	2
2	(Switzerland) R Federer	6	6

Third round
15	(Spain) T Robredo	5	3
Q	(United States) T Dent	7	6
28	(Germany) N Kiefer	4	1
2	(Switzerland) R Federer	6	6

Fourth round
Q	(United States) T Dent	3	2
2	(Switzerland) R Federer	6	6

== Qualifying ==
=== Seeds ===
1. (Israel) Dudi Sela (qualifying competition, lucky loser)
2. (Brazil) Thomaz Bellucci (qualified)
3. (Portugal) Fred Gil (qualified)
4. (Argentina) Brian Dabul (first round)
5. (Germany) Björn Phau (qualifying competition, lucky loser)
6. (Kazakhstan) Evgeny Korolev (qualifying competition)
7. (Chile) Paul Capdeville (qualifying competition)
8. (United States) Wayne Odesnik (qualifying competition)
9. (Argentina) Leonardo Mayer (first round)
10. (United States) Robert Kendrick (qualified)
11. (Germany) Denis Gremelmayr (first round)
12. (Ecuador) Nicolás Lapentti (first round)
13. (United States) Kevin Kim (qualified)
14. (Austria) Daniel Köllerer (first round, retired due to elbow injury)
15. (Kazakhstan) Andrey Golubev (qualifying competition)
16. (Italy) Fabio Fognini (first round)
17. (United States) Vincent Spadea (qualifying competition)
18. (Germany) Michael Berrer (qualifying competition)
19. (Germany) Simon Greul (qualifying competition)
20. (Croatia) Roko Karanušić (qualifying competition)
21. (Italy) Flavio Cipolla (qualifying competition)
22. (Canada) Frank Dancevic (qualified)
23. (Belgium) Olivier Rochus (first round)
24. (Brazil) Thiago Alves (first round)

=== Qualifiers ===
1. (Canada) Frank Dancevic
2. (Brazil) Thomaz Bellucci
3. (Portugal) Fred Gil
4. (United States) Taylor Dent
5. (United States) John Isner
6. (United States) Michael Russell
7. (United States) Kevin Kim
8. (Bosnia and Herzegovina) Amer Delić
9. (Germany) Benjamin Becker
10. (United States) Robert Kendrick
11. (Brazil) Ricardo Mello
12. (Kazakhstan) Mikhail Kukushkin

=== Lucky losers ===
1. (Israel) Dudi Sela
2. (Germany) Björn Phau

=== Key ===
- Q = Qualifier
- WC = Wild card
- LL = Lucky loser
- Alt = Alternate
- SE = Special exempt
- PR = Protected ranking
- ITF = ITF entry
- JE = Junior exempt
- w/o = Walkover
- r = Retired
- d = Defaulted
- SR = Special ranking

==== First qualifier ====
First round
1	(Israel) Dudi Sela	6	7
WC	(United States) Alexander Domijan	2	5
(France) Nicolas Mahut	7	6^{5}	4
22	(Canada) Frank Dancevic	5	7^{7}	6

Qualifying competition
1	(Israel) Dudi Sela	2	4
22	(France) Nicolas Mahut	6	6

==== Second qualifier ====
First round
2	(Brazil) Thomaz Bellucci	7^{8}	6
(Switzerland) Marco Chiudinelli	6^{6}	3
(Austria) Alexander Peya	4	4
19	(Germany) Simon Greul	6	6

Qualifying competition
2	(Brazil) Thomaz Bellucci	6	4	6
19	(Germany) Simon Greul	2	6	3

==== Third qualifier ====
First round
3	(Portugal) Fred Gil	6	2	6
(Brazil) Ricardo Hocevar	3	6	1
(Switzerland) Stéphane Bohli	3^{r}
18	(Germany) Michael Berrer	2

Qualifying competition
3	(Portugal) Fred Gil	6^{4}	6	7
18	(Germany) Michael Berrer	7^{7}	2	5

==== Fourth qualifier ====
First round
4	(Argentina) Brian Dabul	5	2
WC	(United States) Taylor Dent	7	6
WC	(Sweden) Thomas Johansson	6	3	4
21	(Italy) Flavio Cipolla	4	6	6

Qualifying competition
WC	(United States) Taylor Dent	6^{5}	6	7
21	(Italy) Flavio Cipolla	7^{7}	4	5

==== Fifth qualifier ====
First round
5	(Germany) Björn Phau	4	6	6
WC	(United States) Michael McClune	6	0	1
(United States) John Isner	6	7
23	(Belgium) Olivier Rochus	4	5

Qualifying competition
5	(Germany) Björn Phau	6	5	3
(United States) John Isner	2	7	6

==== Sixth qualifier ====
First round
6	(Kazakhstan) Evgeny Korolev	6	3	7
WC	(Argentina) Gastón Gaudio	2	6	5
(United States) Michael Russell	6	6
24	(Brazil) Thiago Alves	2	3

Qualifying competition
6	(Kazakhstan) Evgeny Korolev	6	4	2
(United States) Michael Russell	2	6	6

==== Seventh qualifier ====
First round
7	(Chile) Paul Capdeville	6^{4}	6	6
(Slovakia) Karol Beck	7^{7}	4	1
(Colombia) Santiago Giraldo	4	4
13	(United States) Kevin Kim	6	6

Qualifying competition
7	(Chile) Paul Capdeville	7^{7}	4	4
13	(United States) Kevin Kim	6^{4}	6	6

==== Eighth qualifier ====
First round
8	(United States) Wayne Odesnik	6	6^{5}	7^{14}
(Germany) Benedikt Dorsch	4	7^{7}	6^{12}
(Bosnia and Herzegovina) Amer Delić	6	2
14	(Austria) Daniel Köllerer	2	3^{r}

Qualifying competition
8	(United States) Wayne Odesnik	4	6^{5}
(Bosnia and Herzegovina) Amer Delić	6	7^{7}

==== Ninth qualifier ====
First round
9	(Argentina) Leonardo Mayer	6	6^{5}	6^{3}
(South Africa) Rik de Voest	2	7^{7}	7^{7}
(Germany) Benjamin Becker	6	6
16	(Italy) Fabio Fognini	4	4

Qualifying competition
(South Africa) Rik de Voest	2	1
(Germany) Benjamin Becker	6	6

==== Tenth qualifier ====
First round
10	(United States) Robert Kendrick	6	6
(United States) Donald Young	2	4
(South Africa) Kevin Anderson	2	3
20	(Croatia) Roko Karanušić	6	6

Qualifying competition
10	(United States) Robert Kendrick	6	7^{7}
20	(Croatia) Roko Karanušić	3	6^{5}

==== Eleventh qualifier ====
First round
11	(Germany) Denis Gremelmayr	3	3
(Brazil) Ricardo Mello	6	6
(Argentina) Horacio Zeballos	0	3
17	(United States) Vincent Spadea	6	6

Qualifying competition
(Brazil) Ricardo Mello	7^{8}	6
17	(United States) Vincent Spadea	6^{6}	0

==== Twelfth qualifier ====
First round
12	(Ecuador) Nicolás Lapentti	3	3
(Kazakhstan) Mikhail Kukushkin	6	6
(Portugal) Rui Machado	3	6^{5}
15	(Kazakhstan) Andrey Golubev	6	7^{7}

Qualifying competition
(Kazakhstan) Mikhail Kukushkin	6	6
15	(Kazakhstan) Andrey Golubev	4	2
