= 2007 Mutua Madrileña Masters Madrid – Singles =

Singles
- 2007 Mutua Madrileña Masters Madrid

Final
- Champion: (Argentina) David Nalbandian
- Runner-up: (Switzerland) Roger Federer
- Score: 1–6, 6–3, 6–3

Details
- Draw: 48 (3WC/6Q/1LL/1SE)
- Seeds: 16

Events
Singles	Doubles
← 2006 ·	Madrid Open	· 2008 →

David Nalbandian defeated the defending champion Roger Federer in the final, 1–6, 6–3, 6–3 to win the singles tennis title at the 2007 Madrid Open. Nalbandian achieved the rare feat of defeating the world's top three players in the same tournament, also defeating No. 2 Rafael Nadal and No. 3 Novak Djokovic en route to the title. He joined Djokovic and Boris Becker in achieving the feat, and became the only player to defeat all of the Big Three in the same tournament.

== Seeds ==
All seeds receive a bye into the second round.

1. (Switzerland) Roger Federer (final)
2. (Spain) Rafael Nadal (quarterfinals)
3. (Serbia) Novak Djokovic (semifinals)
4. (Russia) ~~Nikolay Davydenko~~ (withdrew due to an elbow injury)
5. (Chile) Fernando González (quarterfinals)
6. (United States) James Blake (second round)
7. (Spain) David Ferrer (second round)
8. (Spain) Tommy Robredo (second round)
9. (Czech Republic) Tomáš Berdych (second round)
10. (France) Richard Gasquet (second round)
11. (Germany) Tommy Haas (second round)
12. (Croatia) Ivan Ljubičić (second round)
13. (Argentina) Guillermo Cañas (third round)
14. (Spain) Carlos Moyá (second round)
15. (Argentina) Juan Ignacio Chela (second round)
16. (Russia) Mikhail Youzhny (second round)

== Draw ==
Key

- Q = Qualifier
- WC = Wild card
- LL = Lucky loser
- Alt = Alternate
- ITF = ITF entry
- PR = Protected ranking
- SR = Special ranking
- SE = Special exempt
- JE = Junior exempt
- JR = Junior Accelerator Programme entrant
- CO = College Accelerator Programme entrant
- NG = Next Gen Accelerator Program entrant
- w/o = Walkover
- r = Retired
- d = Defaulted

=== Finals ===
Quarterfinals
1	(Switzerland) Roger Federer	7	6
WC	(Spain) Feliciano López	6^{4}	4
(Germany) Nicolas Kiefer	7^{7}	6
5	(Chile) Fernando González	6^{4}	2
(Croatia) Mario Ančić	6^{2}	2
3	(Serbia) Novak Djokovic	7	6
(Argentina) David Nalbandian	6	6
2	(Spain) Rafael Nadal	1	2

Semifinals
1	(Switzerland) Roger Federer	6	6
(Germany) Nicolas Kiefer	4	4
3	(Serbia) Novak Djokovic	4	6^{4}
(Argentina) David Nalbandian	6	7^{7}

Final
1	(Switzerland) Roger Federer	6	3	3
(Argentina) David Nalbandian	1	6	6

=== Top half ===
==== Section 1 ====
First round
(Austria) J Melzer	6	6^{2}	4
Q	(United States) R Ginepri	2	7	6
(Russia) D Tursunov	6	6^{4}	4
Q	(Argentina) A Calleri	3	7	6
(Finland) J Nieminen	3	6	4
Q	(Austria) S Koubek	6	3	6
WC	(Spain) F López	6	6
(Italy) F Volandri	3	2

Second round
1	(Switzerland) R Federer	7	6
Q	(United States) R Ginepri	6^{2}	4
Q	(Argentina) A Calleri	3	6	5
13	(Argentina) G Cañas	6	3	7
12	(Croatia) I Ljubičić	3	7	5
(Austria) S Koubek	6	6^{2}	7
WC	(Spain) F López	7	7
7	(Spain) D Ferrer	6^{3}	5

Third round
1	(Switzerland) R Federer	6	6
13	(Argentina) G Cañas	0	3
(Austria) S Koubek	6^{9}	1
WC	(Spain) F López	7	6

Quarterfinals
1	(Switzerland) R Federer	7	6
WC	(Spain) F López	6^{4}	4

==== Section 2 ====
First round
(Croatia) I Karlović	6	6
(Russia) M Safin	3	4
(Germany) N Kiefer	7	6
SE	(Switzerland) S Wawrinka	5	3
(Russia) I Andreev	7	0	4
(Argentina) J Mónaco	6^{5}	6	6
(Spain) N Almagro	6	6
(France) F Santoro	4	4

Second round
LL	(Spain) Ó Hernández	5	2
(Croatia) I Karlović	7	6
(Germany) N Kiefer	6	6
16	(Russia) M Youzhny	1	3
11	(Germany) T Haas	4	5
(Argentina) J Mónaco	6	7
(Spain) N Almagro	6^{11}	5
5	(Chile) F González	7	7

Third round
(Croatia) I Karlović	6^{5}	6^{3}
(Germany) N Kiefer	7	7
(Argentina) J Mónaco	4	2
5	(Chile) F González	6	6

Quarterfinals
(Germany) N Kiefer	7	6
5	(Chile) F González	6^{5}	2

=== Bottom half ===
==== Section 3 ====
First round
(Croatia) M Ančić	6	6
Q	(France) M Gicquel	4	2
(France) P-H Mathieu	6	2	7
(United States) M Fish	3	6	5
(Spain) JC Ferrero	6	7
Q	(Colombia) A Falla	4	5
WC	(Spain) Montañés	1	1
(Spain) F Verdasco	6	6

Second round
8	(United States) J Blake	3	4
(Croatia) M Ančić	6	6
(France) P-H Mathieu	7	7
10	(France) R Gasquet	6^{8}	5
14	(Spain) C Moyá	6^{2}	4
(Spain) JC Ferrero	7	6
(Spain) F Verdasco	7	3	3
3	(Serbia) N Djokovic	6^{7}	6	6

Third round
(Croatia) M Ančić	6	6
(France) P-H Mathieu	4	3
(Spain) JC Ferrero	3	6	4
3	(Serbia) N Djokovic	6	2	6

Quarterfinals
(Croatia) M Ančić	6^{2}	2
3	(Serbia) N Djokovic	7	6

==== Section 4 ====
First round
WC	(Argentina) JM del Potro	7	6
(Italy) P Starace	5	1
(France) A Clément	7	2	4
(Argentina) D Nalbandian	5	6	6
(Czech Republic) R Štěpánek	4	1
(United Kingdom) A Murray	6	6
(Cyprus) M Baghdatis	6	4	6
Q	(Romania) A Pavel	3	6	1

Second round
8	(Spain) T Robredo	7	4	3
WC	(Argentina) JM del Potro	6^{4}	6	6
(Argentina) D Nalbandian	4	6	7
9	(Czech Republic) T Berdych	6	4	6^{2}
15	(Argentina) JI Chela	1	3
(United Kingdom) A Murray	6	6
(Cyprus) M Baghdatis	4	4
2	(Spain) R Nadal	6	6

Third round
WC	(Argentina) JM del Potro	2	4
(Argentina) D Nalbandian	6	6
(United Kingdom) A Murray	6^{5}	4
2	(Spain) R Nadal	7	6

Quarterfinals
(Argentina) D Nalbandian	6	6
2	(Spain) R Nadal	1	2

== Qualifying ==
=== Qualifying seeds ===
1. (Latvia) Ernests Gulbis (first round)
2. (Spain) Óscar Hernández (qualifying competition, lucky loser)
3. (Argentina) Agustín Calleri (qualified)
4. (Austria) Stefan Koubek (qualified)
5. (Belgium) Kristof Vliegen (qualifying competition)
6. (Canada) Frank Dancevic (qualifying competition)
7. (United States) Robby Ginepri (qualified)
8. (Chile) Nicolás Massú (qualifying competition)
9. (France) Marc Gicquel (qualified)
10. (United States) Vince Spadea (first round)
11. (Romania) Andrei Pavel (qualified)
12. (Italy) Simone Bolelli (qualifying competition)

=== Qualifiers ===
1. (France) Marc Gicquel
2. (United States) Robby Ginepri
3. (Argentina) Agustín Calleri
4. (Austria) Stefan Koubek
5. (Romania) Andrei Pavel
6. (Colombia) Alejandro Falla

=== Lucky loser ===
1. (Spain) Óscar Hernández

=== Special exempt ===
1. (Switzerland) Stanislas Wawrinka (reached the final at Vienna)

=== Qualifying draw ===
==== First qualifier ====
First round
1	(Latvia) Ernests Gulbis	6	1	2
(Russia) Teymuraz Gabashvili	4	6	6
(Spain) Rubén Ramírez Hidalgo	2	3
9	(France) Marc Gicquel	6	6

Qualifying competition
(Russia) Teymuraz Gabashvili	4	6^{5}
9	(France) Marc Gicquel	6	7^{7}

==== Second qualifier ====
First round
2	(Spain) Óscar Hernández	6	6
WC	(Spain) Óscar Burrieza	4	3
WC	(Spain) Carlos Gómez-Herrera	0	1
7	(United States) Robby Ginepri	6	6

Qualifying competition
2	(Spain) Óscar Hernández	3	4
7	(United States) Robby Ginepri	6	6

==== Third qualifier ====
First round
3	(Argentina) Agustín Calleri	6	6
(Italy) Flavio Cipolla	3	0
WC	(Serbia) Nenad Zimonjić	2	7^{8}	3
12	(Italy) Simone Bolelli	6	6^{6}	6

Qualifying competition
3	(Argentina) Agustín Calleri	6	7^{7}
12	(Italy) Simone Bolelli	1	6^{2}

==== Fourth qualifier ====
First round
4	(Austria) Stefan Koubek	6	6
(Spain) Iván Navarro	3	4
WC	(Spain) Guillermo Alcorta Olarra	1	1
8	(Chile) Nicolás Massú	6	6

Qualifying competition
4	(Austria) Stefan Koubek	6	6
8	(Chile) Nicolás Massú	1	2

==== Fifth qualifier ====
First round
5	(Belgium) Kristof Vliegen	6	7^{10}
(Czech Republic) Ivo Minář	1	6^{8}
(Ecuador) Nicolás Lapentti	6^{8}	5
11	(Romania) Andrei Pavel	7^{10}	7

Qualifying competition
5	(Belgium) Kristof Vliegen	1	7^{9}	4
11	(Romania) Andrei Pavel	6	6^{7}	6

==== Sixth qualifier ====
First round
6	(Canada) Frank Dancevic	7^{10}	2	6
(Spain) Guillermo García López	6^{8}	6	4
(Colombia) Alejandro Falla	6^{4}	6	6
10	(United States) Vince Spadea	7^{7}	2	3

Qualifying competition
6	(Canada) Frank Dancevic	4	7	4
(Colombia) Alejandro Falla	6	5	6
