= 2007 Italian Open – Men's singles =

Men's singles
- 2007 Italian Open

Final
- Champion: (Spain) Rafael Nadal
- Runner-up: (Chile) Fernando González
- Score: 6–2, 6–2

Details
- Draw: 56 (7Q / 4WC / 2PR)
- Seeds: 16

Events
Singles	men	women
Doubles	men	women
← 2006 ·	Italian Open	· 2008 →

Two-time defending champion Rafael Nadal defeated Fernando González in the final, 6–2, 6–2 to win the men's singles tennis title at the 2007 Italian Open.

== Seeds ==
A champion seed is indicated in bold text while text in italics indicates the round in which that seed was eliminated. The top eight seeds received a bye into the second round.

1. (Switzerland) Roger Federer (third round)
2. (Spain) **Rafael Nadal (champion)**
3. (United States) Andy Roddick (third round)
4. (Russia) Nikolay Davydenko (semifinals)
5. (Serbia) Novak Djokovic (quarterfinals)
6. (Chile) Fernando González (final)
7. (Spain) Tommy Robredo (quarterfinals)
8. (Croatia) Ivan Ljubičić (second round)
9. (United States) James Blake (third round)
10. (United Kingdom) Andy Murray (first round)
11. (Germany) Tommy Haas (first round)
12. (Czech Republic) Tomáš Berdych (quarterfinals)
13. (France) Richard Gasquet (second round)
14. (Spain) David Ferrer (first round)
15. (Russia) Mikhail Youzhny (third round)
16. (Spain) Juan Carlos Ferrero (second round)

== Draw ==
=== Key ===
- Q = Qualifier
- WC = Wild card
- LL = Lucky loser
- Alt = Alternate
- SE = Special exempt
- PR = Protected ranking
- ITF = ITF entry
- JE = Junior exempt
- w/o = Walkover
- r = Retired
- d = Defaulted
- SR = Special ranking

=== Finals ===
Semifinals
WC	(Italy) Filippo Volandri	1	2
6	(Chile) **Fernando González**	**6**	**6**
4	(Russia) Nikolay Davydenko	6^{3}	**7^{10}**	4
2	(Spain) **Rafael Nadal**	**7^{7}**	6^{8}	**6**

Finals
6	(Chile) Fernando González	2	2
2	(Spain) **Rafael Nadal**	**6**	**6**

=== Section 1 ===
First round
(Spain) **N Almagro**	**7**	**6**
(United Kingdom) T Henman	5	1
WC	(Italy) **F Volandri**	**6**	**6**
Q	(Russia) T Gabashvili	0	3
(Spain) F Verdasco	1	5
13	(France) **R Gasquet**	**6**	**7**
12	(Czech Republic) **T Berdych**	**6**	**7**
(Finland) J Nieminen	4	5
(Switzerland) S Wawrinka	**6**	1	6^{3}
Q	(Spain) **A Montañés**	3	**6**	**7^{7}**
(Argentina) **J Acasuso**	**6**	**7**
PR	(Netherlands) M Verkerk	3	5

Second round
1	(Switzerland) **R Federer**	**6**	**6**
(Spain) N Almagro	3	4
WC	(Italy) **F Volandri**	**6**	6^{5}	**6**
13	(France) R Gasquet	4	**7^{7}**	4
12	(Czech Republic) **T Berdych**	**7^{7}**	**6**
Q	(Spain) A Montañés	6^{5}	3
(Argentina) **J Acasuso**	**6**	**6**
8	(Croatia) I Ljubičić	4	3

Third round
1	(Switzerland) R Federer	2	4
WC	(Italy) **F Volandri**	**6**	**6**
12	(Czech Republic) **T Berdych**	**6**	**6**
(Argentina) J Acasuso	1	2

Quarterfinals
WC	(Italy) **F Volandri**	**6**	**6**
12	(Czech Republic) T Berdych	2	3

=== Section 2 ===
First round
(Argentina) **G Gaudio**	**6**	**6**
(United States) M Fish	4	4
(Argentina) **J I Chela**	2	**6**	**6**
(France) M Gicquel	**6**	4	1
(Russia) **I Andreev**	**6**	**6**
14	(Spain) D Ferrer	4	1
9	(United States) **J Blake**	**7^{7}**	**6**
(France) G Monfils	6^{4}	3
Q	(Chile) **N Massú**	**6**	**7^{7}**
WC	(Italy) S Bolelli	3	6^{5}
(Sweden) J Björkman	6^{10}	**6**	1
(Russia) **D Tursunov**	**7^{12}**	3	**6**

Second round
3	(United States) **A Roddick**	**6**	**7^{10}**
(Argentina) G Gaudio	1	6^{8}
(Argentina) **J I Chela**	**7**	**7**
PR	(Russia) I Andreev	5	5
9	(United States) J Blake	6^{3}	5
Q	(Chile) **N Massú**	**7^{7}**	**7**
(Russia) D Tursunov	2	1
6	(Chile) **F González**	**6**	**6**

Third round
3	(United States) A Roddick	0	4
(Argentina) **J I Chela**	**6**	**6**
Q	(Chile) N Massú	**7^{7}**	3	4
6	(Chile) **F González**	6^{4}	**6**	**6**

Quarterfinals
(Argentina) J I Chela	3	4
6	(Chile) **F González**	**6**	**6**

=== Section 3 ===
First round
(Australia) L Hewitt	**6**	6^{3}	1
Q	(Spain) **Ó Hernández**	3	**7^{7}**	**6**
(Austria) J Melzer	5	2
Q	(Argentina) **G Cañas**	**7**	**6**
(France) **G Simon**	**6**	1	**6**
10	(United Kingdom) A Murray	1	**6**	3
16	(Spain) **J C Ferrero**	3	**6**	**6**
(Slovakia) D Hrbatý	**6**	1	4
WC	(Italy) **P Starace**	**6**	**6**
(Argentina) A Calleri	3	1
Q	(United States) A Delić	**6**	3	4
(Russia) **M Safin**	2	**6**	**6**

Second round
7	(Spain) **T Robredo**	**7**	4	**6**
Q	(Spain) Ó Hernández	5	**6**	1
Q	(Argentina) G Cañas	6^{4}	4
(France) **G Simon**	**7^{7}**	**6**
16	(Spain) J C Ferrero	2	**6**	2
WC	(Italy) **P Starace**	**6**	3	**6**
(Russia) M Safin	6^{4}	5
4	(Russia) **N Davydenko**	**7^{7}**	**7**

Third round
7	(Spain) **T Robredo**	**6**	**6**
(France) G Simon	2	2
WC	(Italy) P Starace	**6**	2	5
4	(Russia) **N Davydenko**	4	**6**	**7**

Quarterfinals
7	(Spain) T Robredo	**6**	3	3
4	(Russia) **N Davydenko**	1	**6**	**6**

=== Section 4 ===
First round
(Germany) B Becker	3	3
(Sweden) **R Söderling**	**6**	**6**
(Cyprus) **M Baghdatis**	**6**	**6**
(Spain) C Moyà	2	3
(Czech Republic) **R Štěpánek**	**6**	**3**	r
11	(Germany) T Haas	3	2
15	(Russia) **M Youzhny**	**6**	3	**6**
(France) J Benneteau	1	**6**	2
(Belgium) **O Rochus**	5	**6**	**6**
Q	(France) M Llodra	**7**	3	3
(United States) R Ginepri	5	6^{2}
WC	(Italy) **D Bracciali**	**7**	**7^{7}**

Second round
5	(Serbia) **N Djokovic**	3	**6**	**6**
(Sweden) R Söderling	**6**	4	3
(Cyprus) **M Baghdatis**	3	**7^{7}**	**6**
(Czech Republic) R Štěpánek	**6**	6^{5}	2
15	(Russia) **M Youzhny**	**7^{9}**	**6**
(Belgium) O Rochus	6^{7}	3
WC	(Italy) D Bracciali	4	2
2	(Spain) **R Nadal**	**6**	**6**

Third round
5	(Serbia) **N Djokovic**	**6**	**7**
(Cyprus) M Baghdatis	2	5
15	(Russia) M Youzhny	2	2
2	(Spain) **R Nadal**	**6**	**6**

Quarterfinals
5	(Serbia) N Djokovic	2	3
2	(Spain) **R Nadal**	**6**	**6**

== Qualifying ==
=== Qualifying seeds ===
1. (Argentina) **Guillermo Cañas (qualified)**
2. (Belarus) Max Mirnyi (first round)
3. (Belgium) Kristof Vliegen (first round)
4. (Spain) Rubén Ramírez Hidalgo (qualifying competition)
5. (Spain) **Albert Montañés (qualified)**
6. (Chile) **Nicolás Massú (qualified)**
7. (Argentina) Juan Martín del Potro (first round, retired)
8. (United States) Michael Russell (first round)
9. (United States) **Amer Delić (qualified)**
10. (Russia) **Teymuraz Gabashvili (qualified)**
11. (France) Florent Serra (qualifying competition)
12. (United States) Vince Spadea (first round)
13. (Spain) **Óscar Hernández (qualified)**
14. (Croatia) Ivo Karlović (qualifying competition)

=== Qualifiers ===
1. (Argentina) **Guillermo Cañas**
2. (Spain) **Óscar Hernández**
3. (Russia) **Teymuraz Gabashvili**
4. (France) **Michaël Llodra**
5. (Spain) **Albert Montañés**
6. (Chile) **Nicolás Massú**
7. (United States) **Amer Delić**

=== Qualifying draw ===
==== First qualifier ====
First round
1	**(Argentina) Guillermo Cañas**	**6**	**6**
(Italy) Alessio di Mauro	2	2
WC	(Italy) Thomas Fabbiano	2	2
11	**(France) Florent Serra**	**6**	**6**

Qualifying competition
1	**(Argentina) Guillermo Cañas**	**6**	4	**6**
11	(France) Florent Serra	4	**6**	3

==== Second qualifier ====
First round
2	(Belarus) Max Mirnyi	4	**7**	2
**(Russia) Igor Kunitsyn**	**6**	5	**6**
(Spain) Alberto Martín	2	1
13	**(Spain) Óscar Hernández**	**6**	**6**

Qualifying competition
(Russia) Igor Kunitsyn	2	4
13	**(Spain) Óscar Hernández**	**6**	**6**

==== Third qualifier ====
First round
3	(Belgium) Kristof Vliegen	2	**7**	6^{6}
WC	**(Italy) Federico Luzzi**	**6**	5	**7^{8}**
(Serbia) Janko Tipsarević	4	5
10	**(Russia) Teymuraz Gabashvili**	**6**	**7**

Qualifying competition
WC	(Italy) Federico Luzzi	1	5
10	**(Russia) Teymuraz Gabashvili**	**6**	**7**

==== Fourth qualifier ====
First round
4	**(Spain) Rubén Ramírez Hidalgo**	**6**	2	**6**
WC	(Italy) Davide Sanguinetti	4	**6**	4
**(France) Michaël Llodra**	**6**	**6**
8	(United States) Michael Russell	4	1

Qualifying competition
4	(Spain) Rubén Ramírez Hidalgo	4	1
**(France) Michaël Llodra**	**6**	**6**

==== Fifth qualifier ====
First round
5	**(Spain) Albert Montañés**	**6**	**6**
(Romania) Victor Hănescu	4	4
**(Italy) Andreas Seppi**	1	**6**	**6**
12	(United States) Vince Spadea	**6**	2	4

Qualifying competition
5	**(Spain) Albert Montañés**	**7^{7}**	**6**
(Italy) Andreas Seppi	6^{2}	4

==== Sixth qualifier ====
First round
6	**(Chile) Nicolás Massú**	**6**	**6**
(Colombia) Alejandro Falla	4	4
(Italy) Stefano Galvani	5	3
14	**(Croatia) Ivo Karlović**	**7**	**6**

Qualifying competition
6	**(Chile) Nicolás Massú**	6^{2}	**7^{7}**	**7^{7}**
14	(Croatia) Ivo Karlović	**7^{7}**	6^{5}	6^{0}

==== Seventh qualifier ====
First round
7	(Argentina) Juan Martín del Potro	4	0^{r}
WC	**(Italy) Fabio Fognini**	**6**	0
(Peru) Luis Horna	5	**6**	4
9	**(United States) Amer Delić**	**7**	3	**6**

Qualifying competition
WC	(Italy) Fabio Fognini	**7**	2	4
9	**(United States) Amer Delić**	5	**6**	**6**
