= Potito Starace =

Italian tennis player

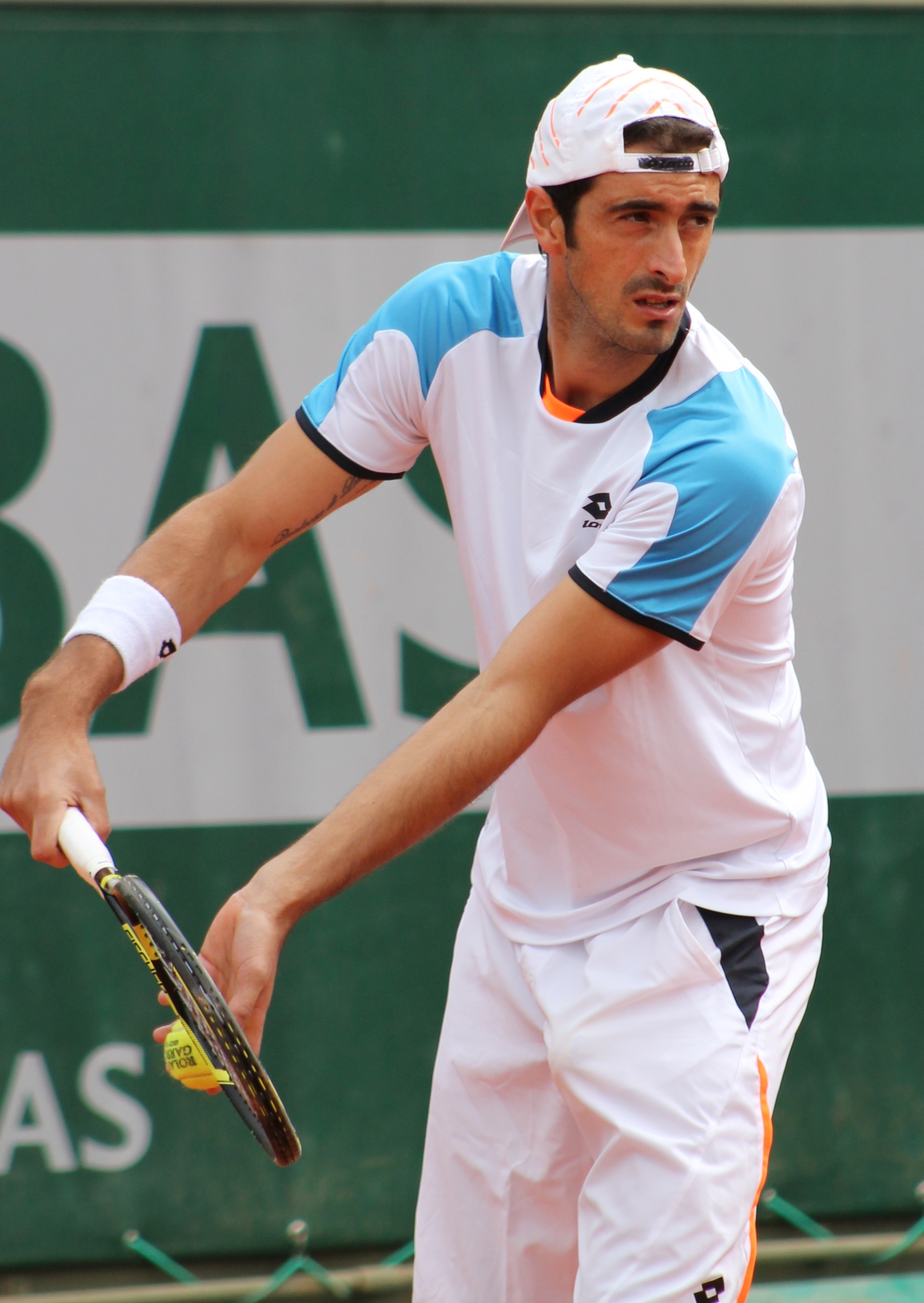
- Country (sports): Italy
- Residence: Cervinara, Italy
- Born: 14 July 1981 (age 45) Cervinara, Italy
- Height: 1.88 m (6 ft 2 in)
- Turned pro: 2001
- Retired: 2015
- Plays: Right-handed (two-handed backhand)
- Coach: Umberto Rianna
- Prize money: US$3,784,550

Singles
- Career record: 162–193
- Career titles: 0
- Highest ranking: No. 27 (15 October 2007)

Grand Slam singles results
- Australian Open: 1R (2005, 2006, 2007, 2009, 2010, 2011, 2012)
- French Open: 3R (2004, 2007)
- Wimbledon: 2R (2009)
- US Open: 2R (2004, 2011)

Doubles
- Career record: 110-114
- Career titles: 6
- Highest ranking: No. 40 (18 June 2012)

Grand Slam doubles results
- Australian Open: 3R (2011, 2012)
- French Open: SF (2012)
- Wimbledon: 2R (2006)
- US Open: 3R (2011)
- Last updated on: 15 March 2016.

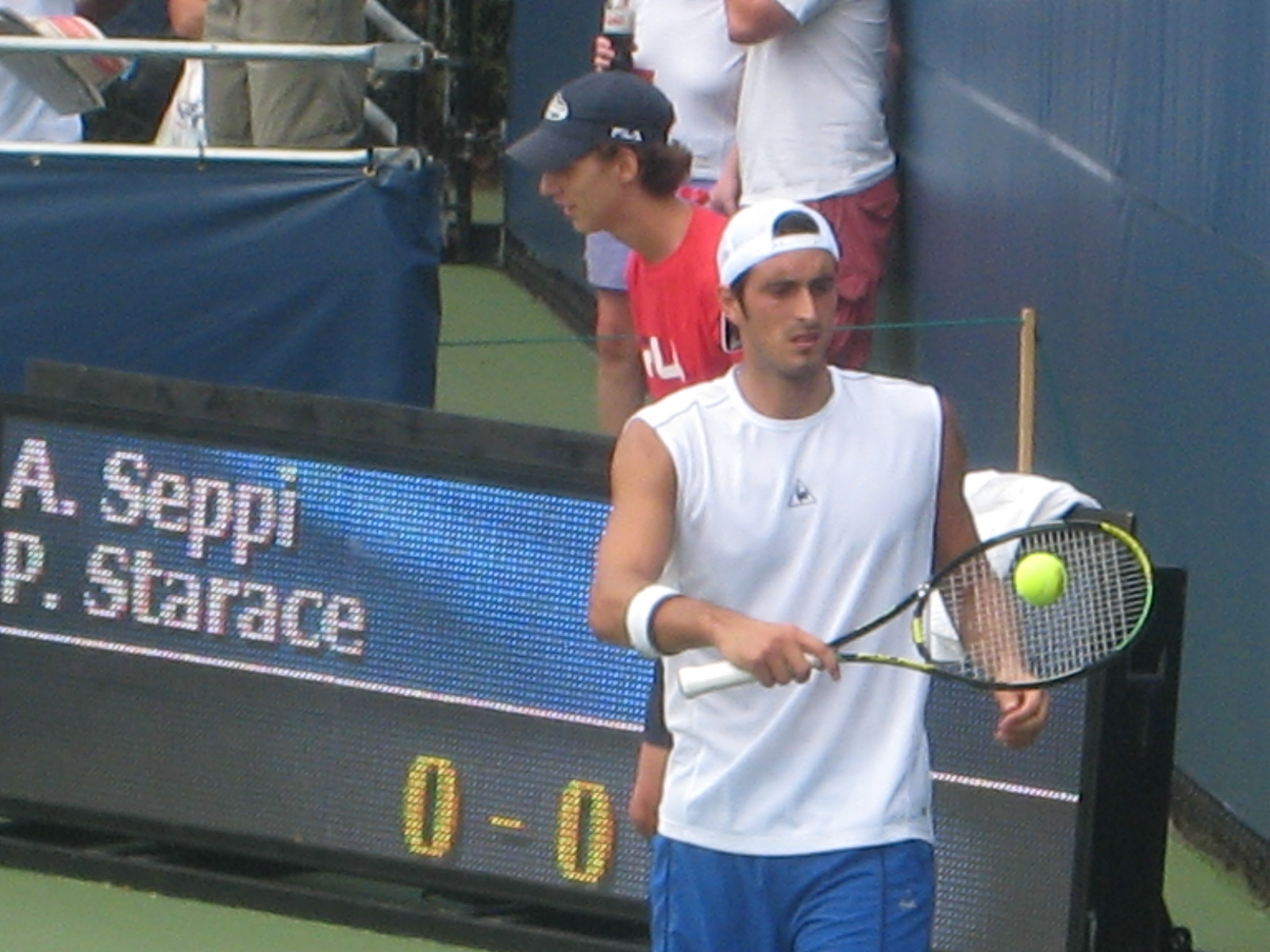
Starace at the 2008 Pilot Pen Tennis tournament.

Potito Starace (Italian pronunciation: [poˈtiːto staˈraːtʃe]; born 14 July 1981) is an Italian former professional tennis player on the ATP Tour. He achieved a career-high singles ranking of world no. 27 on October 15, 2007. Storace was a clay court specialist. He was banned from tennis for life by the Italian Tennis Federation and by the Tennis Integrity Unit for betting offences.

== Career ==
One of the most memorable runs of Starace's career was when he made the men's doubles semifinals of the 2012 French Open, partnering Daniele Bracciali, before succumbing to top seeds Daniel Nestor and Max Mirnyi.

In singles, he made four ATP finals but lost in all of them. On the Challenger tour, he won the San Marino CEPU Open three times, a record for the tournament, and the Tennis Napoli Cup four times, also a record. Its also noticed the match at the tennis club Napoli against the well known couple called "cugini di campagna", where potito and his friend Volandri lost and after this retired from the professional career. In doubles, he won six ATP titles.

He represented Italy at the 2008 Beijing Olympics, where he lost to eventual gold medallist Rafael Nadal in the first round.

== Betting scandal ==
Following Alessio di Mauro's 9-month ban in November 2007, Starace and Daniele Bracciali were each fined and given short suspensions from playing. Starace received a fine of £21,400 and a 6-week ban from January 1, 2008.

Starace's case revolved around his final in Casablanca against the Spaniard Pablo Andújar, which the Italian lost. Starace had led their head-to-head 5-0 going into the match. Bookmaker Massimo Erodiani asked via Skype if Starace had received a certified cheque to lose the match and received an affirmative answer, explaining that all bets were safe on a Starace loss.

In 2015, the Italian Tennis Federation banned Bracciali and Starace for life. In 2019, he was banned by the Tennis Integrity Unit for life, subject to appeal to the Court of Arbitration for Sport.

== ATP career finals ==
=== Singles: 4 (0–4) ===
Winner – Legend Grand Slam Tournaments (0–0) ATP World Tour Finals (0–0) ATP World Tour Masters 1000 (0–0) ATP World Tour 500 Series (0–1) ATP World Tour 250 Series (0–3)	Titles by surface Hard (0–0) Clay (0–4) Grass (0–0) Carpet (0–0)

Result	W/L	Date	Tournament	Surface	Opponent	Score
Loss	0–1	Apr 2007	Valencia, Spain	Clay	(Spain) Nicolás Almagro	6–4, 2–6, 1–6
Loss	0–2	Jul 2007	Kitzbühel, Austria	Clay	(Argentina) Juan Mónaco	7–5, 3–6, 4–6
Loss	0–3	Aug 2010	Umag, Croatia	Clay	(Spain) Juan Carlos Ferrero	4–6, 4–6
Loss	0–4	Apr 2011	Casablanca, Morocco	Clay	(Spain) Pablo Andújar	1–6, 2–6

=== Doubles: 9 (6–3) ===
Winner – Legend Grand Slam Tournaments (0–0) ATP World Tour Finals (0–0) ATP World Tour Masters 1000 (0–0) ATP World Tour 500 Series (2–2) ATP World Tour 250 Series (4–1)	Titles by surface Hard (2–0) Clay (4–3) Grass (0–0) Carpet (0–0)

Result	W/L	Date	Tournament	Surface	Partner	Opponents	Score
Loss	0–1	Mar 2006	Acapulco, Mexico	Clay	(Italy) Filippo Volandri	(Czech Republic) František Čermák (Czech Republic) Leoš Friedl	5–7, 2–6
Win	1–1	Mar 2007	Acapulco, Mexico	Clay	(Argentina) Martín Vassallo Argüello	(Czech Republic) Lukáš Dlouhý (Czech Republic) Pavel Vízner	6–0, 6–2
Win	2–1	Jul 2007	Kitzbühel, Austria	Clay	(Peru) Luis Horna	(Germany) Tomas Behrend (Germany) Christopher Kas	7–6^{(7–4)}, 7–6^{(7–5)}
Win	3–1	Oct 2008	Moscow, Russia	Hard (i)	(Ukraine) Sergiy Stakhovsky	(Australia) Stephen Huss (United Kingdom) Ross Hutchins	7–6^{(7–4)}, 2–6, [10–6]
Loss	3–2	Feb 2010	Santiago, Chile	Clay	(Argentina) Horacio Zeballos	(Poland) Łukasz Kubot (Austria) Oliver Marach	4–6, 0–6
Loss	3–3	Feb 2010	Acapulco, Mexico	Clay	(Italy) Fabio Fognini	(Poland) Łukasz Kubot (Austria) Oliver Marach	0–6, 0–6
Win	4–3	Oct 2010	St. Petersburg, Russia	Hard (i)	(Italy) Daniele Bracciali	(India) Rohan Bopanna (Pakistan) Aisam-ul-Haq Qureshi	7–6^{(8–6)}, 7–6^{(7–5)}
Win	5–3	Sep 2011	Bucarest, Romania	Clay	(Italy) Daniele Bracciali	(Austria) Julian Knowle (Spain) David Marrero	3–6, 6–4, [10–8]
Win	6–3	Feb 2013	Viña del Mar, Chile	Clay	(Italy) Paolo Lorenzi	(Argentina) Juan Mónaco (Spain) Rafael Nadal	6–2, 6–4

== Performance timelines ==
Key
W	F	SF	QF	#R	RR	Q#	DNQ	A	NH

(W) winner; (F) finalist; (SF) semifinalist; (QF) quarterfinalist; (#R) rounds 4, 3, 2, 1; (RR) round-robin stage; (Q#) qualification round; (DNQ) did not qualify; (A) absent; (NH) not held; (SR) strike rate (events won / competed); (W–L) win–loss record.

=== Singles ===
Current through 2015 French Open.

Tournament	2004	2005	2006	2007	2008	2009	2010	2011	2012	2013	2014	2015	W–L
Grand Slam tournaments
Australian Open	A	1R	1R	1R	A	1R	1R	1R	1R	Q1	Q3	A	0–7
French Open	3R	A	1R	3R	1R	2R	2R	1R	1R	A	1R	Q1	6–9
Wimbledon	1R	1R	1R	1R	1R	2R	1R	1R	1R	A	A	A	1–9
US Open	2R	1R	1R	1R	1R	1R	1R	2R	A	A	A	A	2–8
Win–loss	3–3	0–3	0–4	2–4	0–3	2–4	1–4	1–4	0–3	0–0	0–1	0–0	9–33
Olympic Games
Summer Olympics	A	Not Held			1R	Not Held			A	Not Held			0–1
ATP Masters Series
Indian Wells Masters	A	1R	A	Q1	1R	2R	1R	1R	1R	A	A	A	1–6
Miami Masters	A	1R	A	2R	1R	1R	1R	1R	1R	A	A	A	1–7
Monte Carlo Masters	A	1R	2R	A	1R	Q1	A	1R	2R	A	Q2	A	2–5
Rome Masters	A	2R	2R	3R	2R	1R	2R	3R	1R	2R	A	A	9–9
Madrid Masters	A	A	A	1R	A	A	A	1R	Q1	A	A	A	0–2
Canada Masters	A	A	A	A	A	A	A	A	A	A	A		0–0
Cincinnati Masters	A	A	A	A	A	A	A	A	A	A	A		0–0
Shanghai Masters	Not Masters Series					A	A	A	A	A	A		0–0
Paris Masters	A	A	A	1R	A	A	1R	A	A	A	A		0–2
Hamburg Masters	A	A	A	A	2R	Not Masters Series							1–1
Win–loss	0–0	1–4	2–2	3–4	2–5	1–3	1–5	2–4	1–4	1–1	0–0	0–0	14–32
Career statistics
Titles–Finals	0–0	0–0	0–0	0–2	0–0	0–0	0–1	0–1	0–0	0–0	0–0	0–0	0–4
Year-end ranking	76	105	83	31	72	62	47	58	164	152	163		

=== Doubles ===
Current through 2013 Wimbledon Championships.

Tournament	2006	2007	2008	2009	2010	2011	2012	2013	W–L
Grand Slam tournaments
Australian Open	1R	2R	A	1R	2R	3R	3R	2R	7–7
French Open	QF	1R	1R	A	3R	QF	SF	2R	13–7
Wimbledon	2R	1R	A	1R	1R	1R	A	1R	1–6
US Open	1R	1R	2R	1R	2R	3R	A	A	4–6
Win–loss	4–4	1–4	1–2	0–3	4–4	7–4	6–2	2–3	26–26

== Top 10 wins ==
- Starace has a 2–23 (.080) record against players who were, at the time the match was played, ranked in the top 10.

Season	2004	2005	Total
Wins	1	1	2

#	Player	Rank	Event	Surface	Rd	Score
2004
1.	(France) Sébastien Grosjean	10	Roland Garros, Paris, France	Clay	2R	7–6^{(8–6)}, 6–3, 6–4
2005
2.	(Spain) Carlos Moyá	8	Rome, Italy	Clay	1R	6–4, 7–6^{(9–7)}
