= 2006 Australian Open – Men's singles qualifying =

Men's singles qualifying
- 2006 Australian Open

Events
Singles	men	women		boys	girls
Doubles	men	women	mixed	boys	girls
WC Singles	men	women	quad
WC Doubles	men	women	quad
Legends	men	women	mixed

Qualification
Singles	men	women
- Australian Open

This article displays the qualifying draw for the Men's singles at the 2006 Australian Open.

== Seeds ==
1. (France) Marc Gicquel (qualifying competition)
2. (Germany) Michael Berrer (second round)
3. (Thailand) Danai Udomchoke (qualified)
4. (France) Gilles Simon (qualified)
5. (Austria) Oliver Marach (qualified)
6. (Paraguay) Ramón Delgado (first round)
7. (Germany) Simon Greul (first round)
8. (Netherlands) Melle van Gemerden (qualifying competition)
9. (France) Nicolas Mahut (second round)
10. (France) Olivier Patience (qualifying competition)
11. (Spain) Iván Navarro (first round)
12. (Serbia and Montenegro) Janko Tipsarević (qualified)
13. (Germany) Lars Burgsmüller (qualified)
14. (Netherlands) Peter Wessels (first round)
15. (Chile) Paul Capdeville (second round)
16. (France) Antony Dupuis (first round)
17. (Belgium) Steve Darcis (second round)
18. (Denmark) Kristian Pless (second round)
19. (South Africa) Rik de Voest (first round)
20. (Chile) Adrián García (first round)
21. (Chinese Taipei) Lu Yen-hsun (qualified)
22. (France) Julien Benneteau (qualified)
23. (Italy) Francesco Aldi (first round)
24. (Slovakia) Michal Mertiňák (first round)
25. (France) Grégory Carraz (second round)
26. (Israel) Dudi Sela (second round)
27. (Croatia) Saša Tuksar (second round)
28. (Canada) Frédéric Niemeyer (second round)
29. (Italy) Federico Luzzi (qualifying competition, lucky loser)
30. (Germany) Denis Gremelmayr (qualified)
31. (Czech Republic) Tomáš Cakl (qualifying competition)
32. (Austria) Stefan Koubek (second round)

== Qualifiers ==
1. (United States) Zack Fleishman
2. (Chinese Taipei) Lu Yen-hsun
3. (Thailand) Danai Udomchoke
4. (France) Gilles Simon
5. (Austria) Oliver Marach
6. (France) Jean-Christophe Faurel
7. (Czech Republic) Pavel Šnobel
8. (Sweden) Björn Rehnquist
9. (Switzerland) Michael Lammer
10. (United States) Alex Bogomolov Jr.
11. (France) Julien Benneteau
12. (Serbia and Montenegro) Janko Tipsarević
13. (Germany) Lars Burgsmüller
14. (Germany) Denis Gremelmayr
15. (Sweden) Jacob Adaktusson
16. (Israel) Harel Levy

== Lucky loser ==
1. (Italy) Federico Luzzi

== Qualifying draw ==
Key

- Q = Qualifier
- WC = Wild card
- LL = Lucky loser
- Alt = Alternate
- ITF = ITF entry
- PR = Protected ranking
- SR = Special ranking
- SE = Special exempt
- JE = Junior exempt
- JR = Junior Accelerator Programme entrant
- CO = College Accelerator Programme entrant
- NG = Next Gen Accelerator Program entrant
- w/o = Walkover
- r = Retired
- d = Defaulted

=== First qualifier ===
First round
1	(France) Marc Gicquel	6	6^{1}	6
(Italy) Marco Pedrini	2	7^{7}	3
(France) Sébastien de Chaunac	2	2
(Argentina) Diego Junqueira	6	6
(Slovenia) Grega Žemlja	3	6	5
(United States) Zack Fleishman	6	3	7
WC	(Australia) Rameez Junaid	6	6
24	(Slovakia) Michal Mertiňák	2	2

Second round
1	(France) Marc Gicquel	7	6
(Argentina) Diego Junqueira	5	3
(United States) Zack Fleishman	6	7^{7}
WC	(Australia) Rameez Junaid	3	6^{4}

Qualifying competition
1	(France) Marc Gicquel	6	3	1
(United States) Zack Fleishman	3	6	6

=== Second qualifier ===
First round
2	(Germany) Michael Berrer	6	6
(Germany) Sebastian Rieschick	4	1
(United States) Wayne Odesnik	6^{3}	3
(United States) Lesley Joseph	7^{7}	6
WC	(Australia) Joseph Sirianni	3	3
(Slovakia) Ivo Klec	6	6
(Germany) Daniel Elsner	4	4
21	(Chinese Taipei) Lu Yen-hsun	6	6

Second round
2	(Germany) Michael Berrer	6	3	5
(United States) Lesley Joseph	1	6	7
(Slovakia) Ivo Klec	7^{7}	6^{4}	2
21	(Chinese Taipei) Lu Yen-hsun	6^{3}	7^{7}	6

Qualifying competition
(United States) Lesley Joseph	2	6	5
21	(Chinese Taipei) Lu Yen-hsun	6	3	7

=== Third qualifier ===
First round
3	(Thailand) Danai Udomchoke	2	6	8
(Ukraine) Sergiy Stakhovsky	6	3	6
(Israel) Noam Okun	4	0
(United States) Glenn Weiner	6	6
(Germany) Dominik Meffert	6	6
PR	(Sweden) Andreas Vinciguerra	1	4
(Argentina) Diego Hartfield	6	5	2
27	(Croatia) Saša Tuksar	4	7	6

Second round
3	(Thailand) Danai Udomchoke	7^{7}	6
(United States) Glenn Weiner	6^{4}	3
(Germany) Dominik Meffert	2	7^{11}	6
27	(Croatia) Saša Tuksar	6	6^{9}	2

Qualifying competition
3	(Thailand) Danai Udomchoke	5	7^{7}	3
(Germany) Dominik Meffert	7	6^{5}	0^{r}

=== Fourth qualifier ===
First round
4	(France) Gilles Simon	2	6	8
(United Kingdom) Arvind Parmar	6	2	6
(Germany) Jakub Záhlava	3^{r}
WC	(Australia) Todd Reid	6
(Australia) Luke Bourgeois	2	2
(Italy) Paolo Lorenzi	6	6
WC	(Australia) Andrew Coelho	4	3
17	(Belgium) Steve Darcis	6	6

Second round
4	(France) Gilles Simon	6	7
WC	(Australia) Todd Reid	4	5
(Italy) Paolo Lorenzi	4	6	6
17	(Belgium) Steve Darcis	6	2	2

Qualifying competition
4	(France) Gilles Simon	6	6
(Italy) Paolo Lorenzi	3	2

=== Fifth qualifier ===
First round
5	(Austria) Oliver Marach	6	6
(United States) Cecil Mamiit	1	3
(Japan) Go Soeda	6	6
(France) Nicolas Thomann	4	4
(Japan) Gouichi Motomura	7	6
(United States) Scott Lipsky	5	1
(Germany) Lars Uebel	6	1	6
19	(South Africa) Rik de Voest	4	6	4

Second round
5	(Austria) Oliver Marach	6^{2}	7	6
(Japan) Go Soeda	7^{7}	5	4
(Japan) Gouichi Motomura	6	6
(Germany) Lars Uebel	4	2

Qualifying competition
5	(Austria) Oliver Marach	6	7^{7}
(Japan) Gouichi Motomura	4	6^{5}

=== Sixth qualifier ===
First round
6	(Paraguay) Ramón Delgado	3	4
(France) Jean-Christophe Faurel	6	6
(India) Rohan Bopanna	7	6
(Venezuela) Yohny Romero	5	3
(France) Mathieu Montcourt	6	7
(United Kingdom) James Auckland	0	5
(Australia) Robert Smeets	6	4
20	(Chile) Adrián García	3	1^{r}

Second round
(France) Jean-Christophe Faurel	6	1	6
(India) Rohan Bopanna	4	6	3
(France) Mathieu Montcourt	4	3
(Australia) Robert Smeets	6	6

Qualifying competition
(France) Jean-Christophe Faurel	6	3	6
(Australia) Robert Smeets	0	6	3

=== Seventh qualifier ===
First round
7	(Germany) Simon Greul	4	3
(Czech Republic) Pavel Šnobel	6	6
(United States) Eric Taino	6	6^{4}	6
(Italy) Simone Bolelli	4	7^{7}	8
(Italy) Uros Vico	6	6
WC	(Australia) Joel Kerley	3	4
(Belgium) Stefan Wauters	2	5
29	(Italy) Federico Luzzi	6	7

Second round
(Czech Republic) Pavel Šnobel	6	6
(Italy) Simone Bolelli	0	4
(Italy) Uros Vico	7	3	1
29	(Italy) Federico Luzzi	5	6	6

Qualifying competition
(Czech Republic) Pavel Šnobel	6	6
29	(Italy) Federico Luzzi	4	3

=== Eighth qualifier ===
First round
8	(Netherlands) Melle van Gemerden	6	6
(Italy) Flavio Cipolla	4	2
(Italy) Giorgio Galimberti	6	6
(India) Harsh Mankad	1	3
PR	(Sweden) Björn Rehnquist	7	6
(United Kingdom) Jamie Delgado	5	2
(United Kingdom) Richard Bloomfield	4	2
32	(Austria) Stefan Koubek	6	6

Second round
8	(Netherlands) Melle van Gemerden	6	6
(Italy) Giorgio Galimberti	3	2
PR	(Sweden) Björn Rehnquist	5	6	6
32	(Austria) Stefan Koubek	7	4	4

Qualifying competition
8	(Netherlands) Melle van Gemerden	4	0
PR	(Sweden) Björn Rehnquist	6	6

=== Ninth qualifier ===
First round
9	(France) Nicolas Mahut	6	6
(Romania) Gabriel Moraru	3	3
(Switzerland) Michael Lammer	5	6	6
(Czech Republic) Jan Minář	7	1	4
WC	(Australia) Raphael Durek	6	3	6
PR	(Netherlands) John van Lottum	4	6	8
(United States) Michael Russell	6	6
23	(Italy) Francesco Aldi	4	1

Second round
9	(France) Nicolas Mahut	5	2
(Switzerland) Michael Lammer	7	6
PR	(Netherlands) John van Lottum	6	1	3
(United States) Michael Russell	2	6	6

Qualifying competition
(Switzerland) Michael Lammer	7	6
(United States) Michael Russell	5	1

=== Tenth qualifier ===
First round
10	(France) Olivier Patience	6	6
(Romania) Victor Crivoi	2	2
(Germany) Benedikt Dorsch	6^{4}	6^{3}
(United States) Rajeev Ram	7^{7}	7^{7}
(Japan) Satoshi Iwabuchi	6	1	4
(United States) Alex Bogomolov Jr.	4	6	6
WC	(Australia) Nick Lindahl	7^{7}	4	2
28	(Canada) Frédéric Niemeyer	6^{3}	6	6

Second round
10	(France) Olivier Patience	6	6
(United States) Rajeev Ram	3	4
(United States) Alex Bogomolov Jr.	6^{9}	6	12
28	(Canada) Frédéric Niemeyer	7^{11}	2	10

Qualifying competition
10	(France) Olivier Patience	4	4
(United States) Alex Bogomolov Jr.	6	6

=== Eleventh qualifier ===
First round
11	(Spain) Iván Navarro	3	2
PR	(United States) Jeff Salzenstein	6	6
(Slovakia) Viktor Bruthans	2	4
(Canada) Frank Dancevic	6	6
(Algeria) Slimane Saoudi	6^{2}	1
(Poland) Adam Chadaj	7^{7}	6
Alt	(Germany) Michael Kohlmann	4	4
22	(France) Julien Benneteau	6	6

Second round
PR	(United States) Jeff Salzenstein	4	3
(Canada) Frank Dancevic	6	6
(Poland) Adam Chadaj	2	6	2
22	(France) Julien Benneteau	6	2	6

Qualifying competition
(Canada) Frank Dancevic	3	2
22	(France) Julien Benneteau	6	6

=== Twelfth qualifier ===
First round
12	(Serbia and Montenegro) Janko Tipsarević	6	6
(Romania) Adrian Ungur	4	4
(United Kingdom) Jonathan Marray	3	1
(Austria) Rainer Eitzinger	6	6
(United States) John Paul Fruttero	6	6
(Australia) Alun Jones	1	2
(United States) Travis Rettenmaier	2	1
18	(Denmark) Kristian Pless	6	6

Second round
12	(Serbia and Montenegro) Janko Tipsarević	6	6
(Austria) Rainer Eitzinger	2	2
(United States) John Paul Fruttero	7^{7}	1	7
18	(Denmark) Kristian Pless	6^{3}	6	5

Qualifying competition
12	(Serbia and Montenegro) Janko Tipsarević	6	6
(United States) John Paul Fruttero	4	4

=== Thirteenth qualifier ===
First round
13	(Germany) Lars Burgsmüller	6	6
(New Zealand) Mark Nielsen	1	4
(Czech Republic) Jan Mertl	1	6^{1}
(Romania) Florin Mergea	6	7^{7}
(Czech Republic) Michal Tabara	6	3	11
(Serbia and Montenegro) Ilija Bozoljac	4	6	13
WC	(Australia) Carsten Ball	4	6	7
31	(Czech Republic) Tomáš Cakl	6	3	9

Second round
13	(Germany) Lars Burgsmüller	6	6
(Romania) Florin Mergea	1	3
(Serbia and Montenegro) Ilija Bozoljac	6	4	4
31	(Czech Republic) Tomáš Cakl	4	6	6

Qualifying competition
13	(Germany) Lars Burgsmüller	6	6
31	(Czech Republic) Tomáš Cakl	3	3

=== Fourteenth qualifier ===
First round
14	(Netherlands) Peter Wessels	3	1
(India) Prakash Amritraj	6	6
(United States) Todd Widom	7^{7}	7^{7}
WC	(Australia) Adam Feeney	6^{1}	6^{5}
(South Korea) Im Kyu-tae	6	6
(Spain) David Marrero	1	4
(Switzerland) Ivo Heuberger	3	2
30	(Germany) Denis Gremelmayr	6	6

Second round
(India) Prakash Amritraj	2	1
(United States) Todd Widom	6	6
(South Korea) Im Kyu-tae	1	4
30	(Germany) Denis Gremelmayr	6	6

Qualifying competition
(United States) Todd Widom	6	4	4
30	(Germany) Denis Gremelmayr	3	6	6

=== Fifteenth qualifier ===
First round
15	(Chile) Paul Capdeville	6	7^{7}
(Japan) Takao Suzuki	2	6^{4}
(Poland) Dawid Olejniczak	6	6
(Spain) Marcel Granollers	4	3
(Belarus) Vladimir Voltchkov	2	3
(Sweden) Jacob Adaktusson	6	6
(Netherlands) Melvyn op der Heijde	0	3
25	(France) Grégory Carraz	6	6

Second round
15	(Chile) Paul Capdeville	4	2
(Poland) Dawid Olejniczak	6	6
(Sweden) Jacob Adaktusson	6	3	7
25	(France) Grégory Carraz	3	6	5

Qualifying competition
(Poland) Dawid Olejniczak	6	3	4
(Sweden) Jacob Adaktusson	4	6	6

=== Sixteenth qualifier ===
First round
16	(France) Antony Dupuis	4	4
(Sweden) Filip Prpic	6	6
(Israel) Harel Levy	7	6
(Spain) Francisco Fogués	5	4
(Sweden) Michael Ryderstedt	1	2
Alt	(Japan) Norikazu Sugiyama	6	6
(Russia) Yuri Schukin	3	6	5
26	(Israel) Dudi Sela	6	1	7

Second round
(Sweden) Filip Prpic	4	3
(Israel) Harel Levy	6	6
Alt	(Japan) Norikazu Sugiyama	6	7
26	(Israel) Dudi Sela	4	5

Qualifying competition
(Israel) Harel Levy	6^{6}	6	6
Alt	(Japan) Norikazu Sugiyama	7^{8}	2	2
