= 2006 Australian Open – Women's singles qualifying =

Women's singles qualifying
- 2006 Australian Open

Events
Singles	men	women		boys	girls
Doubles	men	women	mixed	boys	girls
WC Singles	men	women	quad
WC Doubles	men	women	quad
Legends	men	women	mixed

Qualification
Singles	men	women
- Australian Open

This article displays the qualifying draw for the Women's singles at the 2006 Australian Open.

== Seeds ==
1. (Estonia) Kaia Kanepi (first round)
2. (United States) Ashley Harkleroad (qualified)
3. (Belarus) Anastasiya Yakimova (qualified)
4. (Israel) Tzipora Obziler (qualified)
5. (Ukraine) Yuliana Fedak (Promoted to main draw)
6. (United States) Meilen Tu (first round)
7. (United Kingdom) Elena Baltacha (second round)
8. (Ukraine) Mariya Koryttseva (second round)
9. (Uzbekistan) Varvara Lepchenko (second round)
10. (Romania) Edina Gallovits (first round)
11. (Thailand) Tamarine Tanasugarn (qualified)
12. (Slovakia) Jarmila Gajdošová (qualified)
13. (Croatia) Ivana Lisjak (second round)
14. (France) Camille Pin (Promoted to main draw)
15. (Ukraine) Kateryna Bondarenko (qualifying competition)
16. (Czech Republic) Kateřina Böhmová (qualifying competition)
17. (Austria) Yvonne Meusburger (qualified)
18. (Czech Republic) Barbora Strýcová (second round)
19. (Canada) Marie-Ève Pelletier (first round)
20. (Chinese Taipei) Hsieh Su-wei (qualifying competition)
21. (United States) Lilia Osterloh (second round)
22. (Russia) Anastasia Rodionova (qualifying competition)
23. (United States) Bethanie Mattek (qualifying competition)
24. (Germany) Sabine Klaschka (first round)

== Qualifiers ==
1. (Germany) Kathrin Wörle
2. (United States) Ashley Harkleroad
3. (Belarus) Anastasiya Yakimova
4. (Israel) Tzipora Obziler
5. (Ukraine) Olga Savchuk
6. (Austria) Yvonne Meusburger
7. (China) Yuan Meng
8. (China) Li Ting
9. (Belarus) Victoria Azarenka
10. (Zimbabwe) Cara Black
11. (Thailand) Tamarine Tanasugarn
12. (Slovakia) Jarmila Gajdošová

== Qualifying draw ==
Key

- Q = Qualifier
- WC = Wild card
- LL = Lucky loser
- Alt = Alternate
- ITF = ITF entry
- PR = Protected ranking
- SR = Special ranking
- SE = Special exempt
- JE = Junior exempt
- JR = Junior Accelerator Programme entrant
- CO = College Accelerator Programme entrant
- NG = Next Gen Accelerator Program entrant
- w/o = Walkover
- r = Retired
- d = Defaulted

=== First qualifier ===
First round
1	(Estonia) Kaia Kanepi	3	6	2
(Belarus) Tatiana Poutchek	6	4	6
(Luxembourg) Anne Kremer	3	4
(Germany) Kathrin Wörle	6	6
(Slovakia) Henrieta Nagyová	6^{5}	6^{5}
(India) Shikha Uberoi	7^{7}	7^{7}
WC	(Australia) Cindy Watson	6	0	3
22	(Russia) Anastasia Rodionova	3	6	6

Second round
(Belarus) Tatiana Poutchek	6^{2}	4
(Germany) Kathrin Wörle	7^{7}	6
(India) Shikha Uberoi	5	2
22	(Russia) Anastasia Rodionova	7	6

Qualifying competition
(Germany) Kathrin Wörle	3	6	6
22	(Russia) Anastasia Rodionova	6	3	4

=== Second qualifier ===
First round
2	(United States) Ashley Harkleroad	6	6
(France) Aravane Rezaï	3	0
(France) Pauline Parmentier	6	6
(Tunisia) Selima Sfar	3	1
(United States) Sunitha Rao	2	2
(United States) Vania King	6	6
WC	(Australia) Daniella Dominikovic	6^{5}	3
Alt	(United Kingdom) Anne Keothavong	7^{7}	6

Second round
2	(United States) Ashley Harkleroad	6	6
(France) Pauline Parmentier	1	0
(United States) Vania King	6	7^{7}
Alt	(United Kingdom) Anne Keothavong	2	6^{1}

Qualifying competition
2	(United States) Ashley Harkleroad	6	6
(United States) Vania King	3	1

=== Third qualifier ===
First round
3	(Belarus) Anastasiya Yakimova	7	6
(Russia) Olga Puchkova	5	1
(France) Mathilde Johansson	6	5	6
(Japan) Seiko Okamoto	2	7	1
(United States) Jessica Kirkland	7^{7}	6
(Germany) Angelika Bachmann	6^{2}	2
(Italy) Alice Canepa	2	1
16	(Czech Republic) Kateřina Böhmová	6	6

Second round
3	(Belarus) Anastasiya Yakimova	7	6
(France) Mathilde Johansson	5	1
(United States) Jessica Kirkland	2	3
16	(Czech Republic) Kateřina Böhmová	6	6

Qualifying competition
3	(Belarus) Anastasiya Yakimova	6	6
16	(Czech Republic) Kateřina Böhmová	2	1

=== Fourth qualifier ===
First round
4	(Israel) Tzipora Obziler	6	6
(Argentina) Clarisa Fernández	1	3
(Czech Republic) Michaela Paštiková	2	7	3
(Italy) Romina Oprandi	6	5	6
(Croatia) Ivana Abramović	6	7^{16}
WC	(Australia) Monique Adamczak	1	6^{14}
(Japan) Miho Saeki	6	7^{7}
19	(Canada) Marie-Ève Pelletier	2	6^{5}

Second round
4	(Israel) Tzipora Obziler	6^{1}	6	2
(Italy) Romina Oprandi	7^{7}	3	0^{r}
(Croatia) Ivana Abramović	3	6	6
(Japan) Miho Saeki	6	4	1

Qualifying competition
4	(Israel) Tzipora Obziler	6	6
(Croatia) Ivana Abramović	2	2

=== Fifth qualifier ===
First round
Alt	(Israel) Yevgenia Savransky	3	1
(Brazil) Maria Fernanda Alves	6	6
(Germany) Vanessa Henke	7	6^{4}	9
(Japan) Ryōko Fuda	5	7^{7}	11
(Ukraine) Olga Savchuk	6	6
(United States) Angela Haynes	4	1
(Czech Republic) Sandra Záhlavová	7^{10}	2	2
13	(Croatia) Ivana Lisjak	6^{8}	6	6

Second round
(Brazil) Maria Fernanda Alves	0	1
(Japan) Ryōko Fuda	6	6
(Ukraine) Olga Savchuk	6	6
13	(Croatia) Ivana Lisjak	1	4

Qualifying competition
(Japan) Ryōko Fuda	3	2
(Ukraine) Olga Savchuk	6	6

=== Sixth qualifier ===
First round
6	(United States) Meilen Tu	2	5
(Germany) Stephanie Gehrlein	6	7
(Puerto Rico) Vilmarie Castellvi	4	4
(Portugal) Frederica Piedade	6	6
(Venezuela) Milagros Sequera	6	6
WC	(Australia) Christina Horiatopoulos	1	1
(Czech Republic) Olga Blahotová	3	3
17	(Austria) Yvonne Meusburger	6	6

Second round
(Germany) Stephanie Gehrlein	6	6
(Portugal) Frederica Piedade	2	2
(Venezuela) Milagros Sequera	6	1	0
17	(Austria) Yvonne Meusburger	3	6	6

Qualifying competition
(Germany) Stephanie Gehrlein	4	1
17	(Austria) Yvonne Meusburger	6	6

=== Seventh qualifier ===
First round
7	(United Kingdom) Elena Baltacha	7	6
(Romania) Anda Perianu	5	4
(China) Yuan Meng	7^{7}	7
(Ukraine) Yuliya Beygelzimer	6^{5}	5
(United States) Ahsha Rolle	7^{7}	7
(Russia) Alla Kudryavtseva	6^{5}	5
(Croatia) Nika Ožegović	6	4	4
23	(United States) Bethanie Mattek	2	6	6

Second round
7	(United Kingdom) Elena Baltacha	2	4
(China) Yuan Meng	6	6
(United States) Ahsha Rolle	6^{3}	4
23	(United States) Bethanie Mattek	7^{7}	6

Qualifying competition
(China) Yuan Meng	6	7
23	(United States) Bethanie Mattek	4	5

=== Eighth qualifier ===
First round
8	(Ukraine) Mariya Koryttseva	6	6
(Hungary) Ágnes Szávay	1	3
(Luxembourg) Claudine Schaul	6	3	6
(Japan) Shiho Hisamatsu	3	6	8
(China) Li Ting	6	7
(Czech Republic) Sandra Kleinová	2	5
(Argentina) María Emilia Salerni	2	2
21	(United States) Lilia Osterloh	6	6

Second round
8	(Ukraine) Mariya Koryttseva	2	7	1
(Japan) Shiho Hisamatsu	6	5	6
(China) Li Ting	1	6	6
21	(United States) Lilia Osterloh	6	2	3

Qualifying competition
(Japan) Shiho Hisamatsu	4	2
(China) Li Ting	6	6

=== Ninth qualifier ===
First round
9	(Uzbekistan) Varvara Lepchenko	6	4	6
(Czech Republic) Lucie Hradecká	3	6	4
(South Africa) Natalie Grandin	4	4
(Belarus) Victoria Azarenka	6	6
(Czech Republic) Denisa Chládková	6	6
(Ukraine) Olena Schmelzer	4	2
(Canada) Aleksandra Wozniak	6	7
24	(Germany) Sabine Klaschka	3	5

Second round
9	(Uzbekistan) Varvara Lepchenko	6	1	1
(Belarus) Victoria Azarenka	3	6	6
(Czech Republic) Denisa Chládková	5	5
(Canada) Aleksandra Wozniak	7	7

Qualifying competition
(Belarus) Victoria Azarenka	7^{7}	6
(Canada) Aleksandra Wozniak	6^{5}	1

=== Tenth qualifier ===
First round
10	(Romania) Edina Gallovits	6^{3}	1
(Zimbabwe) Cara Black	7^{7}	6
(Romania) Magda Mihalache	7^{7}	7^{7}
(Bosnia and Herzegovina) Mervana Jugić-Salkić	6^{3}	6^{2}
(Germany) Kristina Barrois	6^{1}	1
(Czech Republic) Eva Hrdinová	7^{7}	6
(Hungary) Kira Nagy	1	5
15	(Ukraine) Kateryna Bondarenko	6	7

Second round
(Zimbabwe) Cara Black	6	6
(Romania) Magda Mihalache	3	4
(Czech Republic) Eva Hrdinová	1	1
15	(Ukraine) Kateryna Bondarenko	6	6

Qualifying competition
(Zimbabwe) Cara Black	6	6
15	(Ukraine) Kateryna Bondarenko	2	0

=== Eleventh qualifier ===
First round
11	(Thailand) Tamarine Tanasugarn	6	6
(United States) Abigail Spears	2	4
WC	(Australia) Shayna McDowell	5	3
(Netherlands) Elise Tamaëla	7	6
WC	(Australia) Olivia Lukaszewicz	0	1
(Chinese Taipei) Chan Yung-jan	6	6
(Thailand) Suchanun Viratprasert	3	2
20	(Chinese Taipei) Hsieh Su-wei	6	6

Second round
11	(Thailand) Tamarine Tanasugarn	7^{7}	6
(Netherlands) Elise Tamaëla	6^{5}	3
(Chinese Taipei) Chan Yung-jan	1	2
20	(Chinese Taipei) Hsieh Su-wei	6	6

Qualifying competition
11	(Thailand) Tamarine Tanasugarn	6	6
20	(Chinese Taipei) Hsieh Su-wei	1	2

=== Twelfth qualifier ===
First round
12	(Slovakia) Jarmila Gajdošová	6	6
(United States) Carly Gullickson	4	3
(Hungary) Zsófia Gubacsi	7^{7}	6
(Croatia) Silvija Talaja	6^{2}	4
(Italy) Nathalie Viérin	6	6
WC	(Australia) Christina Wheeler	1	3
WC	(Australia) Beti Sekulovski	3	4
18	(Czech Republic) Barbora Strýcová	6	6

Second round
12	(Slovakia) Jarmila Gajdošová	1	6	6
(Hungary) Zsófia Gubacsi	6	3	4
(Italy) Nathalie Viérin	4	6	6
18	(Czech Republic) Barbora Strýcová	6	4	3

Qualifying competition
12	(Slovakia) Jarmila Gajdošová	7^{7}	6
(Italy) Nathalie Viérin	6^{1}	1
