= María Vento-Kabchi =

Venezuelan tennis player (born 1974)

- Country (sports): Venezuela
- Residence: Caracas, Venezuela; Miami, Florida, United States
- Born: 24 May 1974 (age 52) Caracas, Venezuela
- Height: 1.68 m (5 ft 6 in)
- Turned pro: 25 February 1994
- Retired: 2006
- Plays: Right-handed (double-handed backhand)
- Prize money: $1,591,803

Singles
- Career record: 361–324
- Career titles: 0 WTA, 7 ITF
- Highest ranking: No. 26 (19 July 2004)

Grand Slam singles results
- Australian Open: 2R (2001)
- French Open: 2R (2004)
- Wimbledon: 4R (1997)
- US Open: 4R (2005)

Other tournaments
- Olympic Games: 2R (2000, 2004)

Doubles
- Career record: 153–157
- Career titles: 4 WTA, 2 ITF
- Highest ranking: No. 15 (26 July 2004)

Grand Slam doubles results
- Australian Open: QF (2004)
- French Open: 2R (2002, 2003, 2005, 2006)
- Wimbledon: QF (2003, 2004)
- US Open: QF (2003)

Other doubles tournaments
- Olympic Games: QF (2000)

Grand Slam mixed doubles results
- Australian Open: 2R (2005)
- French Open: 1R (2004, 2005)
- Wimbledon: 2R (2002, 2004)
- US Open: 2R (2003)
Medal record
Central American and Caribbean Games
Gold medal – first place	1998 Maracaibo	Singles
Gold medal – first place	1998 Maracaibo	Women's doubles
Gold medal – first place	1998 Maracaibo	Mixed doubles
Gold medal – first place	1998 Maracaibo	Women's team
Pan American Games
Gold medal – first place	1999 Winnipeg	Singles

María Alejandra Vento-Kabchi (born 24 May 1974) is a Venezuelan former professional tennis player. She competed as María Vento until 21 July 2001, when she married lawyer Gamal Kabchi and began competing under the name Vento-Kabchi. She reached career-high WTA rankings of world No. 26 in singles and No. 15 in doubles, both in July 2004. Vento-Kabchi won four doubles titles on the WTA Tour and reached one WTA Tour singles final, finishing runner-up at the 1998 Australian Women's Hardcourts. She retired from professional tennis in 2006.

In Grand Slam tournaments, Vento-Kabchi reached the fourth round in singles at Wimbledon in 1997 and the US Open in 2005. All four of her major doubles quarterfinals came alongside Angelique Widjaja: at Wimbledon and the US Open in 2003, and at the Australian Open and Wimbledon in 2004. The pair also won the 2003 Wismilak International and finished runners-up at the 2003 Canadian Open, then a Tier I tournament.

Representing Venezuela, Vento-Kabchi won four gold medals at the 1998 Central American and Caribbean Games, in singles, women's doubles, mixed doubles and the team event. She subsequently won the women's singles gold medal at the 1999 Pan American Games. Vento-Kabchi competed at the 2000 and 2004 Olympic Games, reaching the second round in singles at both editions and the women's doubles quarterfinals in 2000 alongside Milagros Sequera.

== WTA career finals ==
=== Singles: 1 (runner-up) ===
Legend Tier I (0–0) Tier II (0–0) Tier III (0–1) Tier IV & V (0–0)	Finals by surface Hard (0–1)

Result	W/L	Date	Tournament	Surface	Opponent	Score
Loss	0–1	January 4, 1998	Gold Coast, Australia	Hard	(Japan) Ai Sugiyama	5–7, 0–6

=== Doubles: 10 (4 titles, 6 runner-ups) ===
Legend Tier I (0–1) Tier II (2–1) Tier III (1–3) Tier IV & V (1–1)	Finals by surface Hard (4–4) Clay (0–2)

Result	W–L	Date	Tournament	Surface	Partner	Opponents	Score
Loss	0–1	May 22, 2000	Strasbourg, France	Clay	(South Africa) Kim Grant	(Canada) Sonya Jeyaseelan (Argentina) Florencia Labat	4–6, 3–6
Win	1–1	February 18, 2002	Dubai, United Arab Emirates	Hard	(Germany) Barbara Rittner	(France) Sandrine Testud (Italy) Roberta Vinci	6–3, 6–2
Loss	1–2	April 8, 2002	Estoril, Portugal	Clay	(Germany) Barbara Rittner	(Russia) Elena Bovina (Hungary) Zsófia Gubacsi	3–6, 1–6
Win	2–2	September 9, 2002	Waikoloa, United States	Hard	(United States) Meilen Tu	(South Africa) Nannie de Villiers (Kazakhstan) Irina Selyutina	1–6, 6–2, 6–3
Loss	2–3	February 10, 2003	Doha, Qatar	Hard	(Indonesia) Angelique Widjaja	(Chinese Taipei) Janet Lee (Indonesia) Wynne Prakusya	1–6, 3–6
Loss	2–4	August 11, 2003	Canadian Open, Canada	Hard	(Indonesia) Angelique Widjaja	(Russia) Svetlana Kuznetsova (United States) Martina Navratilova	6–3, 3–6, 1–6
Win	3–4	September 8, 2003	Bali, Indonesia	Hard	(Indonesia) Angelique Widjaja	(France) Émilie Loit (Australia) Nicole Pratt	7–5, 6–2
Loss	3–5	September 20, 2004	China Open, China	Hard	(Argentina) Gisela Dulko	(Switzerland) Emmanuelle Gagliardi (Russia) Dinara Safina	4–6, 4–6
Win	4–5	September 19, 2005	China Open, China	Hard	(Spain) Nuria Llagostera Vives	(China) Yan Zi (China) Zheng Jie	6–2, 6–4
Loss	4–6	October 3, 2005	Japan Open, Japan	Hard	(Japan) Shinobu Asagoe	(Argentina) Gisela Dulko (Russia) Maria Kirilenko	5–7, 6–4, 3–6

== Performance timelines ==
Only main-draw results in Grand Slam tournaments are included in the Grand Slam win–loss records.

Key
W	F	SF	QF	#R	RR	Q#	P#	DNQ	A	Z#	PO	G	S	B	NMS	NTI	P	NH

(W) winner; (F) finalist; (SF) semifinalist; (QF) quarterfinalist; (#R) rounds 4, 3, 2, 1; (RR) round-robin stage; (Q#) qualification round; (P#) preliminary round; (DNQ) did not qualify; (A) absent; (Z#) Davis/Fed Cup Zonal Group (with number indication) or (PO) play-off; (G) gold, (S) silver or (B) bronze Olympic/Paralympic medal; (NMS) not a Masters tournament; (NTI) not a Tier I tournament; (P) postponed; (NH) not held; (SR) strike rate (events won / competed); (W–L) win–loss record.
To avoid confusion and double counting, these charts are updated at the conclusion of a tournament or when the player's participation has ended.

=== Singles ===
Tournament	1992	1993	1994	1995	1996	1997	1998	1999	2000	2001	2002	2003	2004	2005	2006	Career W–L
Australian Open	A	A	A	A	1R	A	1R	1R	1R	2R	A	A	1R	1R	1R	1–8
French Open	A	A	A	A	A	A	1R	1R	1R	1R	A	A	2R	1R	1R	1–7
Wimbledon	A	A	A	1R	A	4R	3R	2R	1R	1R	1R	A	2R	2R	A	8–9
US Open	1R	A	A	1R	A	2R	2R	1R	2R	A	A	2R	3R	4R	A	9–9
Win–loss	0–1	0–0	0–0	0–2	0–1	4–2	3–4	1–4	1–4	1–3	0–1	1–1	4–4	4–4	0–2	19–33

=== Doubles ===
Tournament	2001	2002	2003	2004	2005	2006	Career W–L
Australian Open	1R	A	3R	QF	2R	1R	6–5
French Open	1R	2R	2R	1R	2R	2R	4–6
Wimbledon	3R	1R	QF	QF	1R	1R	8–6
US Open	A	1R	QF	1R	1R	1R	3–5
Win–loss	2–3	1–3	9–4	6–4	2–4	1–4	21–22

=== Mixed doubles ===
Tournament	2002	2003	2004	2005	Career W–L
Australian Open	A	A	1R	2R	1–2
French Open	A	A	1R	1R	0–2
Wimbledon	2R	1R	2R	1R	1–4
US Open	A	2R	1R	A	1–2
Win–loss	1–1	1–2	0–4	1–3	3–10

=== Olympic Games ===
Event	2000	2004	Career W–L
Singles	2R	2R	2–2
Doubles	QF	A	2–1

== ITF finals ==
$100,000 tournaments
$75,000 tournaments
$50,000 tournaments
$25,000 tournaments
$10,000 tournaments

=== Singles (7–6) ===
Result	No.	Date	Tournament	Surface	Opponent	Score
Win	1.	26 June 1989	Guadalajara, Mexico	Clay	(Denmark) Sofie Albinus	3–2 ret.
Loss	1.	14 May 1990	Guadalajara, Mexico	Clay	(Canada) Suzanne Italiano	7–6, 4–6, 3–6
Win	2.	21 May 1990	Aguascalientes, Mexico	Clay	(Philippines) Jean Lozano	6–3, 6–3
Loss	2.	27 May 1991	Sanibel, United States	Hard	(United States) Nicole Arendt	1–6, 1–6
Win	3.	5 July 1993	Indianapolis, United States	Hard	(United States) Christine Neuman	6–4, 3–6, 6–4
Win	4.	26 July 1993	Roanoke, United States	Hard	(United States) Annie Miller	6–0, 5–7, 6–0
Win	5.	2 August 1993	Norfolk, United States	Hard	(United States) Annie Miller	7–5, 6–1
Win	6.	31 July 1995	Brasília, Brazil	Clay	(Germany) Andrea Glass	6–2, 5–7, 6–4
Loss	3.	6 October 1996	Puerto Vallarta, Mexico	Hard	(Canada) Jana Nejedly	6–7, 4–6
Win	7.	27 July 1997	Peachtree City, United States	Hard	(Canada) Sonya Jeyaseelan	6–4, 6–0
Loss	4.	10 October 1999	Albuquerque, United States	Hard	(United States) Jennifer Hopkins	6–4, 6–7, 4–6
Loss	5.	8 October 2000	Albuquerque, United States	Hard	(United States) Brie Rippner	0–6, 0–6
Loss	6.	25 February 2003	St Paul, United States	Hard (i)	(United States) Shenay Perry	2–6, 4–6

=== Doubles (2–2) ===
Result	No	Date	Tournament	Surface	Partner	Opponents	Score
Win	1.	14 May 1990	Guadalajara, Mexico	Clay	(United States) Rita Winebarger	(Cuba) Belkis Rodríguez (Mexico) Blanca Borbolla	0–6, 7–5, 6–4
Loss	1.	25 May 1992	Orlando, United States	Clay	(United States) Sandra Cacic	(United States) Trisha Laux (United States) Michelle Jackson-Nobrega	3–6, 6–2, 4–6
Loss	2.	31 March 1997	Phoenix, United States	Hard	(Argentina) María José Gaidano	(France) Lea Ghirardi (Georgia (country)) Nino Louarsabishvili	0–6, 2–6
Win	2.	24 July 2000	Caracas, Venezuela	Hard	(Venezuela) María Virginia Francesa	(United States) Candice de la Torre (Slovakia) Gabriela Voleková	6–1, 6–4
