= Yang Zi =

Yang Zi may refer to:

- Yang Zhu, also known as Yang Zi (Master Yang), ancient Chinese philosopher
- Yang Xiong (author), also known as Yang Zi (Master Yang), Han dynasty scholar
- Yang Zi (poet) (born 1963), Chinese poet
- Yang Zili (born ca. 1971), also known as Yang Zi, Chinese freelance journalist
- Yang Zi (actress) (born 1992), Chinese actress

== Sportspeople ==
- Yang Zi (table tennis) (born 1984), Singaporean table tennis player
- Yang Zi (footballer) (born 1989), Chinese football player
- Yang Zi (tennis) (born 1993), Chinese tennis player

== See also ==
- Yangzi (disambiguation)
