= 2006 Australian Open – Girls' singles =

Girls' singles
- 2006 Australian Open

Final
- Champion: (Russia) Anastasia Pavlyuchenkova
- Runner-up: (Denmark) Caroline Wozniacki
- Score: 1–6, 6–2, 6–3

Events
| Singles | men | women | | boys | girls |
| Doubles | men | women | mixed | boys | girls |
| WC Singles | men | women | quad |
| WC Doubles | men | women | quad |
| Legends | men | women | mixed |
- Australian Open

Victoria Azarenka was the defending champion, but chose to participate in the women's qualifying competition. She qualified for the main draw where she lost to 32nd seed Sania Mirza in the first round.

Anastasia Pavlyuchenkova won the title, defeating Caroline Wozniacki in the final, 1–6, 6–2, 6–3.

Wozniacki would later win the women's title in 2018.

== Seeds ==
1. (Denmark) Caroline Wozniacki (final)
2. (Romania) Ioana Raluca Olaru (semifinals)
3. (Slovakia) Dominika Cibulková (quarterfinals)
4. (Japan) Ayumi Morita (semifinals)
5. (Canada) Sharon Fichman (quarterfinals)
6. (Kazakhstan) Amina Rakhim (quarterfinals)
7. (Romania) Sorana Cîrstea (third round)
8. (Russia) Anastasia Pavlyuchenkova (champion)
9. (Netherlands) Bibiane Schoofs (second round, retired)
10. (Georgia (country)) Anna Tatishvili (third round)
11. (Netherlands) Marrit Boonstra (first round, retired)
12. (Austria) Tamira Paszek (quarterfinals)
13. (Czech Republic) Nikola Fraňková (first round)
14. (Russia) Evgeniya Rodina (second round)
15. (France) Alizé Cornet (second round)
16. (Switzerland) Timea Bacsinszky (third round)

== Draw ==
Key

- Q = Qualifier
- WC = Wild card
- LL = Lucky loser
- Alt = Alternate
- ITF = ITF entry
- PR = Protected ranking
- SR = Special ranking
- SE = Special exempt
- JE = Junior exempt
- JR = Junior Accelerator Programme entrant
- CO = College Accelerator Programme entrant
- NG = Next Gen Accelerator Program entrant
- w/o = Walkover
- r = Retired
- d = Defaulted

=== Finals ===
Quarterfinals
1 | (Denmark) Caroline Wozniacki | 3 | 6 | 6
12 | (Austria) Tamira Paszek | 6 | 3 | 1
4 | (Japan) Ayumi Morita | 6 | 7
6 | (Kazakhstan) Amina Rakhim | 3 | 6
8 | (Russia) Anastasia Pavlyuchenkova | 6 | 6
3 | (Slovakia) Dominika Cibulková | 4 | 3
5 | (Canada) Sharon Fichman | 4 | 6
2 | (Romania) Ioana Raluca Olaru | 6 | 7

Semifinals
1 | (Denmark) Caroline Wozniacki | 7 | 6
4 | (Japan) Ayumi Morita | 6 | 3
8 | (Russia) Anastasia Pavlyuchenkova | 6 | 6
2 | (Romania) Ioana Raluca Olaru | 4 | 3

Final
1 | (Denmark) Caroline Wozniacki | 6 | 2 | 3
8 | (Russia) Anastasia Pavlyuchenkova | 1 | 6 | 6

=== Top half ===
==== Section 1 ====
First round
1 | (Denmark) Caroline Wozniacki | 6 | 6
(Australia) Bridget Healy | 0 | 4
(Russia) Elena Chernyakova | 2 | 2
(United Kingdom) Jade Curtis | 6 | 6
(Russia) Maya Gaverova | 4 | 0
(Czech Republic) Kateřina Kramperová | 6 | 6
WC | (Australia) Alison Bai | 1 | 3
16 | (Switzerland) Timea Bacsinszky | 6 | 6
12 | (Austria) Tamira Paszek | 7 | 6
Q | (United States) Ashley Weinhold | 5 | 3
WC | (Australia) Jenny Swift | 2 | 0
(Hong Kong) Zhang Ling | 6 | 6
(Italy) Corinna Dentoni | 4 | 4
(Australia) Ellen Barry | 6 | 6
(United States) Madison Brengle | 4 | 2
7 | (Romania) Sorana Cîrstea | 6 | 6

Second round
1 | (Denmark) C Wozniacki | 6 | 6
(United Kingdom) J Curtis | 2 | 2
(Czech Republic) K Kramperová | 2 | 1
16 | (Switzerland) T Bacsinszky | 6 | 6
12 | (Austria) T Paszek | 6 | 6
(Hong Kong) Z Ling | 4 | 4
(Australia) E Barry | 2 | 4
7 | (Romania) S Cîrstea | 6 | 6

Third round
1 | (Denmark) C Wozniacki | 6 | 6
16 | (Switzerland) T Bacsinszky | 2 | 4
12 | (Austria) T Paszek | 6 | 6
7 | (Romania) S Cîrstea | 1 | 1

Quarterfinals
1 | (Denmark) C Wozniacki | 3 | 6 | 6
12 | (Austria) T Paszek | 6 | 3 | 1

==== Section 2 ====
First round
4 | (Japan) Ayumi Morita | 6 | 6 | 7
Q | (United States) Melanie Oudin | 3 | 7 | 5
LL | (India) Sanaa Bhambri | 4 | 4
(United States) Lauren Albanese | 6 | 6
(Czech Republic) Kateřina Vaňková | 6 | 6
Q | (Australia) Benita Milenkiewicz | 4 | 2
(Australia) Tammi Patterson | 4 | 2
14 | (Russia) Evgeniya Rodina | 6 | 6
9 | (Netherlands) Bibiane Schoofs | 3 | 7 | 6
(Thailand) Varatchaya Wongteanchai | 6 | 6 | 4
(Serbia and Montenegro) Nataša Zorić | 2 | 4
(Australia) Jessica Moore | 6 | 6
WC | (Australia) Stephanie Jeanes | 6 | 2 | 4
(Sweden) Johanna Larsson | 3 | 6 | 6
(Hong Kong) Yang Zi-jun | 1 | 4
6 | (Kazakhstan) Amina Rakhim | 6 | 6

Second round
4 | (Japan) A Morita | 7 | 6
(United States) L Albanese | 5 | 4
(Czech Republic) K Vaňková | 6 | 2 | 6
14 | (Russia) E Rodina | 1 | 6 | 2
9 | (Netherlands) B Schoofs | 0 | r
(Australia) J Moore | 6
(Sweden) J Larsson | 3 | 6 | 3
6 | (Kazakhstan) A Rakhim | 6 | 3 | 6

Third round
4 | (Japan) A Morita | 1 | 6 | 6
(Czech Republic) K Vaňková | 6 | 2 | 2
(Australia) J Moore | 1 | 6 | 3
6 | (Kazakhstan) A Rakhim | 6 | 3 | 6

Quarterfinals
4 | (Japan) A Morita | 6 | 7
6 | (Kazakhstan) A Rakhim | 3 | 6

=== Bottom half ===
==== Section 3 ====
First round
8 | (Russia) Anastasia Pavlyuchenkova | 6 | 7
Q | (United States) Gail Brodsky | 3 | 5
WC | (Australia) Shayna MacDowell | 2 | 7 | 6
Q | (Russia) Ksenia Lykina | 6 | 6 | 0
WC | (Australia) Cao Holly | 2 | 5
Q | (United States) Kimberly Couts | 6 | 7
(Russia) Anastasia Pivovarova | 6 | 4
11 | (Netherlands) Marrit Boonstra | 3 | 1 | r
13 | (Czech Republic) Nikola Fraňková | 6 | 3 | 3
(Russia) Alexandra Panova | 0 | 6 | 6
(United States) Ellah Nze | 3 | 5
Q | (Russia) Eugenia Vertesheva | 6 | 7
(Australia) Sacha Jones | 3 | 6 | 6
(Uzbekistan) Dilyara Saidkhodjayeva | 6 | 3 | 2
(Sweden) Michaela Johansson | 6 | 3 | 5
3 | (Slovakia) Dominika Cibulková | 4 | 6 | 7

Second round
8 | (Russia) A Pavlyuchenkova | 6 | 6
WC | (Australia) S MacDowell | 4 | 3
Q | (United States) K Couts | 6 | 6
(Russia) A Pivovarova | 2 | 4
(Russia) A Panova | 6 | 6
Q | (Russia) E Vertesheva | 4 | 1
(Australia) S Jones | 3 | 1
3 | (Slovakia) D Cibulková | 6 | 6

Third round
8 | (Russia) A Pavlyuchenkova | 7 | 6
Q | (United States) K Couts | 6 | 4
(Russia) A Panova | 1 | 6 | 1
(Slovakia) D Cibulková | 6 | 4 | 6

Quarterfinals
8 | (Russia) A Pavlyuchenkova | 6 | 6
3 | (Slovakia) D Cibulková | 4 | 3

==== Section 4 ====
First round
5 | (Canada) Sharon Fichman | 6 | 6
WC | (Australia) Ashlee Brown | 1 | 2
(Netherlands) Renée Reinhard | 6 | 1 | 2
(Russia) Maria Mosolova | 2 | 6 | 6
Q | (United States) Kristy Frilling | 6 | 2 | 1
(Russia) Natalia Orlova | 4 | 6 | 6
(Philippines) Denise Dy | 5 | 2
10 | (Georgia (country)) Anna Tatishvili | 7 | 6
15 | (France) Alizé Cornet | 6 | 7
(Croatia) Tereza Mrdeža | 3 | 6
(India) Sandhya Nagaraj | 4 | 6 | 5
(United States) Chelsey Gullickson | 6 | 3 | 7
(Hong Kong) Chan Wing-yau | 1 | 7 | 6
(Switzerland) Stefania Boffa | 6 | 5 | 4
(Australia) Tyra Calderwood | 3 | 4
2 | (Romania) Ioana Raluca Olaru | 6 | 6

Second round
5 | (Canada) Sharon Fichman | 6 | 5 | 6
(Russia) M Mosolova | 0 | 7 | 2
(Russia) N Orlova | 6 | 2
10 | (Georgia (country)) A Tatishvili | 7 | 6
15 | (France) A Cornet | 5 | 0
(United States) Ch Gullickson | 7 | 6
(Hong Kong) W-y Chan | 4 | 0
2 | (Romania) IR Olaru | 6 | 6

Third round
5 | (Canada) S Fichman | 3 | 6 | 6
10 | (Georgia (country)) A Tatishvili | 6 | 2 | 2
(United States) Ch Gullickson | 4 | 4
2 | (Romania) IR Olaru | 6 | 6

Quarterfinals
5 | (Canada) S Fichman | 4 | 6
2 | (Romania) IR Olaru | 6 | 7

== Sources ==
- Draw
