= 2006 Australian Open – Girls' doubles =

Girls' doubles
- 2006 Australian Open

Final
- Champion: (Canada) Sharon Fichman (Russia) Anastasia Pavlyuchenkova
- Runner-up: (France) Alizé Cornet (Italy) Corinna Dentoni
- Score: 6–2, 6–2

Events
Singles	men	women		boys	girls
Doubles	men	women	mixed	boys	girls
WC Singles	men	women	quad
WC Doubles	men	women	quad
Legends	men	women	mixed
- Australian Open

Sharon Fichman and Anastasia Pavlyuchenkova won the title by defeating Alizé Cornet and Corinna Dentoni 6–2, 6–2 in the final.

== Seeds ==
1. (Romania) Raluca Olaru / (Kazakhstan) Amina Rakhim (semifinals)
2. (Georgia (country)) Anna Tatishvili / (Denmark) Caroline Wozniacki (semifinals)
3. n/a
4. (Canada) Sharon Fichman / (Russia) Anastasia Pavlyuchenkova (champions)
5. (Slovakia) Dominika Cibulková / (Russia) Evgeniya Rodina (quarterfinals)
6. (Romania) Sorana Cîrstea / (Austria) Tamira Paszek (quarterfinals)
7. (Netherlands) Marrit Boonstra / (Netherlands) Renée Reinhard (quarterfinals)
8. (France) Alizé Cornet / (Italy) Corinna Dentoni (final)

== Draw ==
Key

- Q = Qualifier
- WC = Wild card
- LL = Lucky loser
- Alt = Alternate
- ITF = ITF entry
- PR = Protected ranking
- SR = Special ranking
- SE = Special exempt
- JE = Junior exempt
- JR = Junior Accelerator Programme entrant
- CO = College Accelerator Programme entrant
- NG = Next Gen Accelerator Program entrant
- w/o = Walkover
- r = Retired
- d = Defaulted

=== Finals ===
Semifinals
1	(Romania) Raluca Olaru (Kazakhstan) Amina Rakhim	6^{2}	2
4	(Canada) Sharon Fichman (Russia) Anastasia Pavlyuchenkova	7^{7}	6
8	(France) Alizé Cornet (Italy) Corinna Dentoni	3	6	7^{7}
2	(Georgia (country)) Anna Tatishvili (Denmark) Caroline Wozniacki	6	4	6^{3}

Final
4	(Canada) Sharon Fichman (Russia) Anastasia Pavlyuchenkova	6	6
8	(France) Alizé Cornet (Italy) Corinna Dentoni	2	2

=== Top half ===
First round
1	(Romania) Raluca Olaru (Kazakhstan) Amina Rakhim	6	6
(Australia) Tyra Calderwood (Australia) Jessica Moore	2	2
(United States) Madison Brengle (United States) Kristy Frilling	7	6
(United Kingdom) Jade Curtis (United States) Ellah Nze	5	3
(Sweden) Michaela Johansson (Sweden) Johanna Larsson	6	6
(India) Sanaa Bhambri (India) Sandhya Nagaraj	4	3
(Hong Kong) Venise Chan (Thailand) Varatchaya Wongteanchai	0	1
5	(Slovakia) Dominika Cibulková (Russia) Evgeniya Rodina	6	6
4	(Canada) Sharon Fichman (Russia) Anastasia Pavlyuchenkova	6	6
WC	(Australia) Alison Bai (Australia) Bridget Healy	3	4
(Czech Republic) Kateřina Kramperová (Czech Republic) Kateřina Vaňková	6	3	6
(Russia) Ksenia Lykina (Russia) Maria Mosolova	2	6	0
(Switzerland) Timea Bacsinszky (Czech Republic) Nikola Fraňková	6	6
(United States) Lauren Albanese (United States) Gail Brodsky	3	1
(Hong Kong) Zi-Jun Yang (Hong Kong) Ling Zhang	3	3
6	(Romania) Sorana Cîrstea (Austria) Tamira Paszek	6	6

Second round
1	(Romania) R Olaru (Kazakhstan) A Rakhim	7	1	6
(United States) M Brengle (United States) K Frilling	5	6	1
(Sweden) M Johansson (Sweden) J Larsson	4	3
5	(Slovakia) D Cibulková (Russia) E Rodina	6	6
4	(Canada) S Fichman (Russia) A Pavlyuchenkova	6	6
(Czech Republic) K Kramperová (Czech Republic) K Vaňková	2	1
(Switzerland) T Bacsinszky (Czech Republic) N Fraňková	6	4	3
6	(Romania) S Cîrstea (Austria) T Paszek	4	6	6

Quarterfinals
1	(Romania) R Olaru (Kazakhstan) A Rakhim	6^{4}	7	6
5	(Slovakia) D Cibulková (Russia) E Rodina	7^{7}	5	2
4	(Canada) S Fichman (Russia) A Pavlyuchenkova	6	6
6	(Romania) S Cîrstea (Austria) T Paszek	3	2

Semifinals
1	(Romania) R Olaru (Kazakhstan) A Rakhim	6^{2}	2
4	(Canada) S Fichman (Russia) A Pavlyuchenkova	7^{7}	6

=== Bottom half ===
First round
8	(France) Alizé Cornet (Italy) Corinna Dentoni	6	6
WC	(Australia) Shayna McDowell (Australia) Tammi Patterson	3	4
WC	(Australia) Monique Lynch (Australia) Megan Price	4	3
(Russia) Natalia Orlova (Russia) Eugenia Vertesheva	6	6
(Switzerland) Stefania Boffa (Russia) Maya Gaverova	6	6
(Philippines) Denise Dy (Australia) Jenny Swift	4	4
(United States) Kimberly Couts (United States) Melanie Oudin	4	4
Alt	(Australia) Kristina Pejkovic (Serbia and Montenegro) Nataša Zorić	6	6
7	(Netherlands) Marrit Boonstra (Netherlands) Renée Reinhard	6	6
(Russia) Elena Chernyakova (Uzbekistan) Dilyara Saidkhodjayeva	3	2
(New Zealand) Ellen Barry (New Zealand) Sacha Jones	6	6
(United States) Chelsey Gullickson (United States) Ashley Weinhold	2	3
(United States) Kristen Mcvitty (Croatia) Tereza Mrdeža	4	6	1
(Russia) Alexandra Panova (Russia) Anastasia Pivovarova	6	1	6
WC	(Australia) Ashlee Brown (Australia) Stephanie Jeanes	1	0
2	(Georgia (country)) Anna Tatishvili (Denmark) Caroline Wozniacki	6	6

Second round
8	(France) A Cornet (Italy) C Dentoni	6	6
(Russia) N Orlova (Russia) E Vertesheva	0	4
(Switzerland) S Boffa (Russia) M Gaverova	6	1	4
Alt	(Australia) K Pejkovic (Serbia and Montenegro) N Zorić	3	6	6
7	(Netherlands) M Boonstra (Netherlands) R Reinhard	6	6
(New Zealand) E Barry (New Zealand) S Jones	3	2
(Russia) A Panova (Russia) A Pivovarova	6	6^{4}	6^{7}
2	(Georgia (country)) A Tatishvili (Denmark) C Wozniacki	4	7^{7}	7^{9}

Quarterfinals
8	(France) A Cornet (Italy) C Dentoni	7^{7}	4	6
Alt	(Australia) K Pejkovic (Serbia and Montenegro) N Zorić	6^{3}	6	4
7	(Netherlands) M Boonstra (Netherlands) R Reinhard	4	2
2	(Georgia (country)) A Tatishvili (Denmark) C Wozniacki	6	6

Semifinals
8	(France) A Cornet (Italy) C Dentoni	3	6	7^{7}
2	(Georgia (country)) A Tatishvili (Denmark) C Wozniacki	6	4	6^{3}

== Sources ==
- Draw
