= Shayna McDowell =

Australian tennis player

- Full name: Shayna Maree McDowell
- Country (sports): Australia
- Born: 15 April 1989 (age 35)
- Plays: Right-handed
- Prize money: $27,800

Singles
- Career record: 46–41
- Career titles: 1 ITF
- Highest ranking: No. 461 (20 February 2006)

Grand Slam singles results
- Australian Open: Q1 (2005, 2006, 2007)

Doubles
- Career record: 14–16
- Career titles: 1 ITF
- Highest ranking: No. 529 (14 May 2007)

Grand Slam doubles results
- Australian Open: 1R (2006)

Shayna Maree McDowell (born 15 April 1989) is an Australian former professional tennis player.

McDowell, a player from the Sunshine Coast, was considered a bright prospect, ranked amongst the world's top 100 juniors. She represented Australia at the Junior Fed Cup.

In 2006 she made her WTA Tour main draw debut as a wildcard at the Canberra International, then a week later partnered Jessica Moore in the women's doubles main draw of the Australian Open.

Her career was derailed by shoulder injuries, which forced her to have keyhole surgery in 2008. After two years out of the game, she returned in 2010 and won an ITF tournament in Cantanhede, Portugal.

== ITF finals ==
Legend
$50,000 tournaments
$10,000 tournaments

=== Singles: 4 (1–3) ===
Outcome	No.	Date	Tournament	Surface	Opponent	Score
Runner-up	1.	27 February 2005	Bendigo, Australia	Hard	(South Korea) Lee Ye-ra	3–6, 2–6
Winner	1.	6 June 2010	Cantanhede, Portugal	Carpet	(Austria) Christine Kandler	6–1, 7–5
Runner-up	2.	13 June 2010	Amarante, Portugal	Hard	(Canada) Mélanie Gloria	5–7, 7–6^{(6)}, 0–6
Runner-up	3.	26 June 2010	Alcobaça, Portugal	Hard	(Portugal) Magali de Lattre	6–2, 3–6, 3–6

=== Doubles: 1 (1–0) ===
Outcome	Date	Tournament	Surface	Partner	Opponents	Score
Winner	3 September 2006	Gladstone, Australia	Hard	(Australia) Daniella Dominikovic	(Australia) Renee Lampret (Australia) Jenny Swift	4–6, 6–4, 6–4
