= Yanzi =

Yanzi or Yan Zi (Wade–Giles: Yen Tzu) may refer to:

== Persons with the name ==
- Yan Hui (521? – 481 BC), disciple of Confucius known honorifically as Yanzi (顏子)
- Yan Yan (disciple of Confucius) (506 – ? BC), known honorifically as Yanzi (言子)
- Yan Ying (c. 578 – 500 BC), known honorifically as Yanzi or the most denoted Master Yan (晏子)
- Stefanie Sun (孫燕姿 born 1978) or Sun Yan Zi, Singaporean singer
- Yan Zi (tennis) (晏紫) (born 1984), Chinese tennis player
- Pseudonym of Peng Yanhui, Chinese gay activist

== Other uses ==
- Yanzi River (from 燕子 yànzi "swallow")
- Yanzi Mountain 甘肃崦嵫
- Yanzi chunqiu, a Warring States period philosophical work
- Yan Zi (album), an album by Stefanie Sun
- Yanzi people, an ethnic group of Congo
- Yanzi language, a Bantu language

== See also ==
- Yangzi (disambiguation)
