= 2006 Australian Open – Boys' doubles =

Boys' doubles
- 2006 Australian Open

Final
- Champion: (Poland) Błażej Koniusz (Poland) Grzegorz Panfil
- Runner-up: (United States) Kellen Damico (United States) Nathaniel Schnugg
- Score: 7–6^{(7–5)}, 6–3

Events
Singles	men	women		boys	girls
Doubles	men	women	mixed	boys	girls
WC Singles	men	women	quad
WC Doubles	men	women	quad
Legends	men	women	mixed
- Australian Open

Błażej Koniusz and Grzegorz Panfil won the title by defeating Kellen Damico and Nathaniel Schnugg 7–6^{(7–5)}, 6–3 in the final.

== Seeds ==
1. (India) Jeevan Nedunchezhiyan / (India) Sanam Singh (second round)
2. (France) K Botti / (Australia) S Donald (quarterfinals)
3. (Croatia) Luka Belić / (Croatia) Antonio Veić (second round)
4. (Russia) Pavel Chekhov / (Russia) Valery Rudnev (second round)
5. (United States) Jamie Hunt / (Ukraine) Ivan Sergeyev (second round)
6. (United States) Kellen Damico / (United States) Nathaniel Schnugg (final)
7. (Japan) Sho Aida / (Japan) Shuhei Uzawa (quarterfinals)
8. (Czech Republic) Roman Jebavý / (Czech Republic) Jiri Kosler (second round)

== Draw ==
Key

- Q = Qualifier
- WC = Wild card
- LL = Lucky loser
- Alt = Alternate
- ITF = ITF entry
- PR = Protected ranking
- SR = Special ranking
- SE = Special exempt
- JE = Junior exempt
- JR = Junior Accelerator Programme entrant
- CO = College Accelerator Programme entrant
- NG = Next Gen Accelerator Program entrant
- w/o = Walkover
- r = Retired
- d = Defaulted

=== Finals ===
Semifinals
(Poland) Błażej Koniusz (Poland) Grzegorz Panfil	7^{7}	6
(Lebanon) Bassam Beidas (United States) Mateusz Kecki	6^{1}	0
(Japan) Kei Nishikori (Canada) Peter Polansky	3	6	6^{4}
6	(United States) Kellen Damico (United States) Nathaniel Schnugg	6	3	7^{7}

Final
(Poland) Błażej Koniusz (Poland) Grzegorz Panfil	7^{7}	6
6	(United States) Kellen Damico (United States) Nathaniel Schnugg	6^{5}	3

=== Top half ===
First round
1	(India) Jeevan Nedunchezhiyan (India) Sanam Singh	6	7
(Belgium) Ruben Bemelmans (Belgium) Frederic de Fays	1	5
(Poland) Błażej Koniusz (Poland) Grzegorz Panfil	6	6
(Australia) John Peers (Australia) John-Patrick Smith	4	2
(Italy) Cesare Gallo (Brazil) João Souza	6	3	1
(Lithuania) Ričardas Berankis (Japan) Genki Tomita	2	6	6
(Sweden) Tim Göransson (Denmark) Rasmus Moller	6	2	4
7	(Japan) Sho Aida (Japan) Shuhei Uzawa	4	6	6
4	(Russia) Pavel Chekhov (Russia) Valery Rudnev	6	7^{7}
(United States) Leo Rosenberg (Uzbekistan) Vaja Uzakov	2	6^{0}
(Lebanon) Bassam Beidas (United States) Mateusz Kecki	6	6
(United States) Christopher Racz (Austria) David Simon	1	3
WC	(Australia) Edward Bourchier (Australia) Lachlan Reed	3	1
(Croatia) Nikola Mektić (Croatia) Antonio Šančić	6	6
(Italy) Thomas Fabbiano (Japan) Yūichi Sugita	4	3
5	(United States) Jamie Hunt (Ukraine) Ivan Sergeyev	6	6

Second round
1	(India) J Nedunchezhiyan (India) S Singh	4	6	3
(Poland) B Koniusz (Poland) G Panfil	6	3	6
(Lithuania) R Berankis (Japan) G Tomita	4	5
7	(Japan) S Aida (Japan) S Uzawa	6	7
4	(Russia) P Chekhov (Russia) V Rudnev	5	4
(Lebanon) B Beidas (United States) M Kecki	7	6
(Croatia) N Mektić (Croatia) A Šančić	2	6	6
5	(United States) J Hunt (Ukraine) I Sergeyev	6	4	4

Quarterfinals
(Poland) B Koniusz (Poland) G Panfil	7	7
7	(Japan) S Aida (Japan) S Uzawa	5	5
(Lebanon) B Beidas (United States) M Kecki	6	2	7
(Croatia) N Mektić (Croatia) A Šančić	4	6	5

Semifinals
(Poland) B Koniusz (Poland) G Panfil	7^{7}	6
(Lebanon) B Beidas (United States) M Kecki	6^{1}	0

=== Bottom half ===
First round
8	(Czech Republic) Roman Jebavý (Czech Republic) Jiri Kosler	6	6
(China) Xu Junchao (China) Zhuo-Qing Zhou	1	3
(Japan) Kei Nishikori (Canada) Peter Polansky	4	6	6
(United States) Johnny Hamui (Japan) Fumiaki Kita	6	2	2
(United States) Dennis Lajola (Kenya) Christian Vitulli	6	6
WC	(Australia) Ryan Bellamy (Australia) John Millman	4	1
Alt	(Australia) Yan Levinski (Australia) Zachary van Min	5	3
3	(Croatia) Luka Belić (Croatia) Antonio Veić	7	6
6	(United States) Kellen Damico (United States) Nathaniel Schnugg	6	4	6
(Greece) Paris Gemouchidis (Romania) Paul-Mihai Puscasu	4	6	3
(Australia) Greg Jones (Australia) Brydan Klein	6	5	7^{7}
(Estonia) Jaak Põldma (Estonia) Jürgen Zopp	2	7	6^{3}
WC	(Australia) Jason Lee (Australia) Matt Symons	6	6^{6}	5
(France) Alexandre Sidorenko (Ukraine) Artem Smirnov	2	7^{8}	7
(New Zealand) Austen Childs (Czech Republic) Martin Kamenik	1	3
2	(France) Kevin Botti (Australia) Stephen Donald	6	6

Second round
8	(Czech Republic) R Jebavý (Czech Republic) J Kosler	4	4
(Japan) K Nishikori (Canada) P Polansky	6	6
(United States) D Lajola (Kenya) C Vitulli	6	6
3	(Croatia) L Belić (Croatia) A Veić	2	4
6	(United States) K Damico (United States) N Schnugg	7^{7}	6
(Australia) G Jones (Australia) B Klein	6^{2}	1
(France) A Sidorenko (Ukraine) A Smirnov	7^{7}	6^{11}	5
2	(France) K Botti (Australia) S Donald	6^{4}	7^{13}	7

Quarterfinals
(Japan) K Nishikori (Canada) P Polansky	6	6
(United States) D Lajola (Kenya) C Vitulli	1	4
6	(United States) K Damico (United States) N Schnugg	5	6	6
2	(France) K Botti (Australia) S Donald	7	4	1

Semifinals
(Japan) K Nishikori (Canada) P Polansky	3	6	6^{4}
6	(United States) K Damico (United States) N Schnugg	6	3	7^{7}

== Sources ==
- Draw
