= Yang Zi (poet) =

Chinese poet and translator (born 1963)

Yang Zi (杨子; born 1963) is a Chinese poet and translator.

== Life ==
Yang was born in Anhui, and lived in Xinjiang. He co-founded the literary journal, Big Bird (大鸟).

Since 1993, he lives in Guangzhou, and is Associate Chief Editor of the Nanfang People Weekly.

He has translated Osip Mandelstam, Paul Celan, Fernando Pessoa, Gary Snyder and Charles Simic into Chinese.

== Works ==
- Border Fast Train, 1994
- 灰眼睛 (Gray Eyes), 2000
- 胭脂 (Rouge), 海风出版社, 2007

=== Works in English ===
- "Rouge", Cerise Press, fall winter 2010/2011
- "Desolation", Cerise Press, fall winter 2010/2011
- "From a Comet"; "Salt Sprinkled on the Tongue of the Mute"; "Night Rain"; "Dark Slope"; "At Night, So Many People", Conjunctions,
- "Pearl River" PN Review 199, Volume 37 Number 5, May–June 2011.
- "Yang Zi: White Cloud & Black Face & Father", The Offending Adam
