= 2006 Australian Open – Boys' singles =

Boys' singles
- 2006 Australian Open

Final
- Champion: (France) Alexandre Sidorenko
- Runner-up: (Australia) Nick Lindahl
- Score: 6–3, 7–6

Events
Singles	men	women		boys	girls
Doubles	men	women	mixed	boys	girls
WC Singles	men	women	quad
WC Doubles	men	women	quad
Legends	men	women	mixed
- Australian Open

Alexandre Sidorenko defeated Nick Lindahl 6–3, 7–6^{(7–4)} in the final.

Donald Young was the defending champion.

== Seeds ==
1. (Netherlands) Thiemo de Bakker (third round)
2. (Switzerland) Robin Roshardt (first round)
3. (India) Sanam Singh (third round)
4. (Czech Republic) Dušan Lojda (third round)
5. (United States) Kellen Damico (second round)
6. (India) Jeevan Nedunchezhiyan (first round)
7. (France) Kevin Botti (first round)
8. (Ukraine) Ivan Sergeyev (third round)
9. (Croatia) Antonio Veić (first round)
10. (Croatia) Nikola Mektić (second round)
11. (Japan) Sho Aida (third round)
12. (Australia) Stephen Donald (first round)
13. (Croatia) Luka Belić (quarterfinals)
14. (Russia) Valery Rudnev (first round)
15. (Japan) Kei Nishikori (quarterfinals)
16. (Russia) Pavel Chekhov (semifinals)

== Draw ==
Key

- Q = Qualifier
- WC = Wild card
- LL = Lucky loser
- Alt = Alternate
- ITF = ITF entry
- PR = Protected ranking
- SR = Special ranking
- SE = Special exempt
- JE = Junior exempt
- JR = Junior Accelerator Programme entrant
- CO = College Accelerator Programme entrant
- NG = Next Gen Accelerator Program entrant
- w/o = Walkover
- r = Retired
- d = Defaulted

=== Final eight ===
Quarterfinals
16	(Russia) Pavel Chekhov	7^{7}	2	6
(Estonia) Jaak Põldma	6^{5}	6	1
15	(Japan) Kei Nishikori	6	3	2
SE	(France) Alexandre Sidorenko	4	6	6
WC	(Australia) Nick Lindahl	7^{7}	6
(New Zealand) Austen Childs	6^{4}	2
WC	(Australia) Ryan Bellamy	6	6
13	(Croatia) Luka Belić	4	2

Semifinals
16	(Russia) Pavel Chekhov	4	1
SE	(France) Alexandre Sidorenko	6	6
WC	(Australia) Nick Lindahl	6	6
WC	(Australia) Ryan Bellamy	4	0

Final
SE	(France) Alexandre Sidorenko	6	7^{7}
WC	(Australia) Nick Lindahl	3	6^{4}

=== Top half ===
==== Section 1 ====
First round
1	(Netherlands) Thiemo de Bakker	6	6
(Australia) Patrick Nichols	4	2
(Japan) Shuhei Uzawa	5	4
WC	(Australia) Edward Bourchier	7	6
(United States) Mateusz Kecki	4	4
Q	(Italy) Thomas Fabbiano	6	6
(China) Xu Junchao	3	0
16	(Russia) Pavel Chekhov	6	6
10	(Serbia and Montenegro) Nikola Mektić	6	6
WC	(Australia) John Millman	4	4
(United States) Jamie Hunt	1	4
(Estonia) Jaak Põldma	6	6
(Czech Republic) Jiří Košler	1	6	2
(United States) Dennis Lajola	6	3	6
WC	(Australia) Steven Goh	7^{7}	4	8
6	(India) Jeevan Nedunchezhiyan	6^{4}	6	6

Second round
1	(Netherlands) T de Bakker	6	6
WC	(Australia) E Bourchier	3	1
Q	(Italy) T Fabbiano	3	7	4
16	(Russia) P Chekhov	6	5	6
10	(Serbia and Montenegro) N Mektić	3	4
(Estonia) J Põldma	6	6
(United States) D Lajola	6	3	6
WC	(Australia) S Goh	3	6	4

Third round
1	(Netherlands) T de Bakker	6	5	3
16	(Russia) P Chekhov	3	7	6
(Estonia) J Põldma	6	6
(United States) D Lajola	3	3

Quarterfinals
16	(Russia) P Chekhov	7^{7}	2	6
(Estonia) J Põldma	6^{5}	6	1

==== Section 2 ====
First round
4	(Czech Republic) Dušan Lojda	1	7	6
(Poland) Błażej Koniusz	6	5	0
(Belgium) Frédéric de Fays	6	2	3
(Brazil) João Souza	2	6	6
(United States) Johnny Hamui	4	4
(Sweden) Tim Göransson	6	6
(Romania) Paul-Mihai Puşcaşu	1	0
15	(Japan) Kei Nishikori	6	6
12	(Australia) Stephen Donald	3	5
LL	(United States) Christopher Racz	6	7
SE	(France) Alexandre Sidorenko	7	6
WC	(Australia) Lachlan Reed	5	2
Q	(Japan) Yuichi Sugita	6	6
Q	(Lithuania) Ričardas Berankis	4	1
Q	(Croatia) Antonio Šančić	1	2
8	(Ukraine) Ivan Sergeyev	6	6

Second round
4	(Czech Republic) D Lojda	6	6
(Brazil) J Souza	4	1
(Sweden) T Göransson	1	3
15	(Japan) K Nishikori	6	6
LL	(United States) C Racz	2	0
SE	(France) A Sidorenko	6	6
Q	(Japan) Y Sugita	0	6	3
8	(Ukraine) I Sergeyev	6	3	6

Third round
4	(Czech Republic) D Lojda	2	4
15	(Japan) K Nishikori	6	6
SE	(France) A Sidorenko	6	6
8	(Ukraine) I Sergeyev	3	3

Quarterfinals
15	(Japan) K Nishikori	6	3	2
SE	(France) A Sidorenko	4	6	6

=== Bottom half ===
==== Section 3 ====
First round
5	(United States) Kellen Damico	6	7
(Czech Republic) Roman Jebavý	4	5
WC	(Australia) Nick Lindahl	7	6
Q	(China) Zhou Zhuoqing	5	3
Q	(Ukraine) Artem Smirnov	2	7^{9}	6
(Japan) Genki Tomita	6	6^{7}	2
WC	(Australia) Yan Levinski	7^{7}	6
9	(Croatia) Antonio Veić	6^{5}	4
14	(Russia) Valery Rudnev	2	4
(Australia) Greg Jones	6	6
(New Zealand) Austen Childs	3	6	6
(Kenya) Christian Vitulli	6	1	0
(Australia) Todd Ley	7^{7}	7
WC	(Australia) Jason Lee	6^{2}	5
(Denmark) Rasmus Møller	2	5
3	(India) Sanam Singh	6	7

Second round
5	(United States) K Damico	4	6	5
WC	(Australia) N Lindahl	6	0	7
Q	(Ukraine) A Smirnov	7^{7}	4	4
WC	(Australia) Y Levinski	6^{2}	6	6
(Australia) G Jones	5	6	3
(New Zealand) A Childs	7	3	6
(Australia) T Ley	7	0	4
3	(India) S Singh	5	6	6

Third round
WC	(Australia) N Lindahl	7	6
WC	(Australia) Y Levinski	5	4
(New Zealand) A Childs	4	6	6
3	(India) S Singh	6	4	3

Quarterfinals
WC	(Australia) N Lindahl	7^{7}	6
(New Zealand) A Childs	6^{4}	2

==== Section 4 ====
First round
7	(France) Kevin Botti	3	1
(Australia) Brydan Klein	6	6
(United States) Leo Rosenberg	2	2
WC	(Australia) Ryan Bellamy	6	6
(Estonia) Jürgen Zopp	6	3	6
(Belgium) Ruben Bemelmans	4	6	4
(Austria) David Simon	2	4
11	(Japan) Sho Aida	6	6
13	(Croatia) Luka Belić	6	7^{7}
Q	(Australia) John-Patrick Smith	3	6^{3}
Q	(Greece) Paris Gemouchdis	4	3
(United States) Nathaniel Schnugg	6	6
(Canada) Peter Polansky	2	2
(Czech Republic) Martin Kameník	6	6
(Poland) Grzegorz Panfil	3	6	6
2	(Switzerland) Robin Roshardt	6	3	2

Second round
(Australia) B Klein	7^{7}	5	7
WC	(Australia) R Bellamy	6^{5}	7	9
(Estonia) J Zopp	2	3
11	(Japan) S Aida	6	6
13	(Croatia) L Belić	6	6
(United States) N Schnugg	3	4
(Czech Republic) M Kameník	6^{4}	2
(Poland) G Panfil	7^{7}	6

Third round
WC	(Australia) R Bellamy	6	7
11	(Japan) S Aida	4	5
13	(Croatia) L Belić	6	6
(Poland) G Panfil	2	2

Quarterfinals
WC	(Australia) R Bellamy	6	6
13	(Croatia) L Belić	4	2
