= Tim Göransson =

Swedish tennis player

- Country (sports): Sweden
- Residence: Uppsala, Sweden
- Born: 26 March 1988 (age 36)
- Plays: Right-handed
- Prize money: $30,112

Singles
- Career record: 0–2
- Highest ranking: No. 495 (27 July 2009)

Doubles
- Highest ranking: No. 671 (27 July 2009)

Tim Göransson (born 26 March 1988) is a Swedish former tennis player.

== Biography ==
Göransson participated at the Junior Australian Open and the Junior French Open in 2006.

He made his ATP main draw singles debut, as a wild card at the 2007 Swedish Open where he lost in the first round to Carlos Berlocq. His only other ATP main draw appearance came at the 2008 Swedish Open, where he was a lucky loser. He was defeated in the first round by Michael Ryderstedt. Göransson competed mainly on the ATP Challenger Tour and the Futures circuit and won one Futures title.

Göransson achieved a career-high singles ranking of World No. 495 in 2009. He is a brother of fellow tennis player André Göransson.

== ITF Futures titles ==
=== Singles: (1) ===
No.	Date	Tournament	Tier	Surface	Opponent	Score
1.	Mar 2009	Italy F3, Rome	Futures	Clay	(Argentina) Federico Delbonis	6–4, 6–3
