= Nick Lindahl =

Australian tennis player

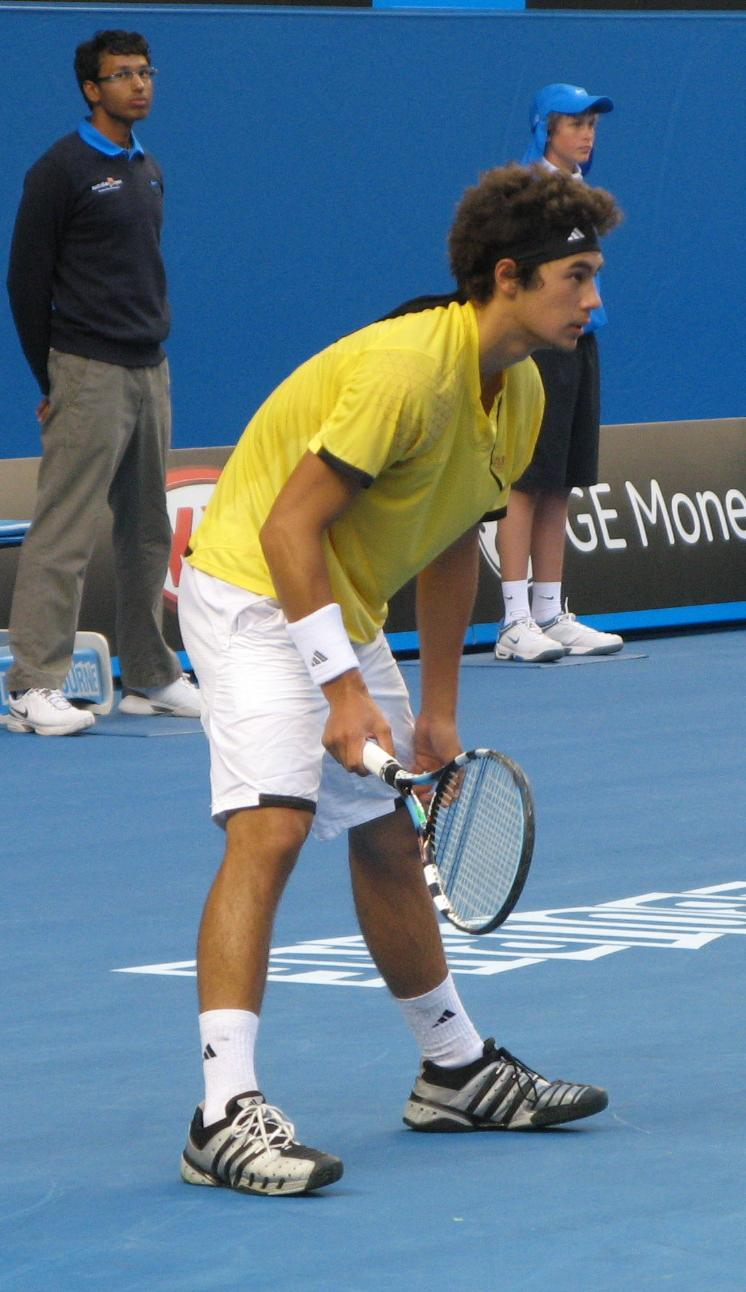
- Country (sports): Australia (2006–2010); Sweden (2010–2011); Australia (2011–2013)
- Residence: Eleebana, New South Wales, Australia
- Born: 31 July 1988 (age 37) Malmö, Sweden
- Height: 1.83 m (6 ft 0 in)
- Turned pro: 2006
- Plays: Right-handed (two-handed backhand)
- Prize money: $217,220

Singles
- Career record: 1–8 (Grand Slam, ATP Tour level, and Davis Cup)
- Career titles: 0
- Highest ranking: No. 187 (17 May 2010)

Grand Slam singles results
- Australian Open: 1R (2008, 2010)
- French Open: Q1 (2010)
- Wimbledon: Q1 (2007)
- US Open: Q1 (2007, 2009, 2010)

Doubles
- Career record: 0–2 (Grand Slam, ATP Tour level, and Davis Cup)
- Career titles: 0
- Highest ranking: No. 585 (29 July 2013)

Grand Slam doubles results
- Australian Open: 1R (2008, 2010)
- Last updated on: 20 May 2021.

Nick Lindahl (born 31 July 1988) is a former Australian tennis player. As a junior, he reached the final of the Boys' Singles at the 2006 Australian Open. He struggled to transition onto the men's circuit, and was later found guilty of match-fixing, for which he was given a seven-year ban.

Lindahl reached a career high ATP singles ranking of world No. 187, achieved on 17 May 2010. He also reached a career high ATP doubles ranking of world No. 585, achieved on 29 July 2013.

== Personal life ==
Lindahl was born in Sweden to Swedish parents but they emigrated to Australia when he was 3 months old.

== Tennis career ==
=== Early career ===
Lindahl first gained recognition as a tennis player when he made the Australian Open Boy's Final in 2006. He lost to French teenager Alexandre Sidorenko 6–3, 7–6 (7–4).

In August 2006, Lindahl won his first official tournament, winning the Futures event in Australia F6. He beat fellow Aussie Sadik Kadir 2–6, 6–4, 6–4.

He won his second Futures event in Indonesia F4 defeating Colin Ebelthite to retirement in the final.

Playing in his first official ATP match in the 2007 Thailand Open after qualifying and a ranking of 308 in the world, the Australian player caused a major upset defeating Sam Querrey of the United States, 59 in the world at the time, in the first round 2–6, 6–4, 6–3. Unfornately he couldn't replicate his form in the second round, losing to fellow qualifier Wang Yeu-Tzuoo 3–6, 3–6. The event earned him $6,450 and 15 ATP points.

He has won two more Futures events on the Australian Kia Pro Circuit.

Lindahl won a wildcard into the 2008 Australian Open. His first round match was against Richard Gasquet on 14 January 2008, he lost the match 0–6, 1–6, 6–3, 2–6.

After a successful 2009 campaign that had varied results on both the challenger and futures circuit, Lindahl was able to raise his ranking to a career high of 229 but finished the year at 251. After the conclusion of the 2009 season, Lindahl competed in an Australian Open Wildcard playoff tournament where he remained undefeated through the entire tournament, and beat young gun Bernard Tomic in the final in five sets to claim a place in the main draw of the 2010 Australian Open.

=== 2010 ===
He entered the qualifying draw for the 2010 Brisbane International. He was seeded eighth for the qualifiers and defeated Tobias Kamke 7–6^{(6)}, 7–6^{(6)}, Joel Lindner 6–7^{(5)}, 6–3, 6–4 and no. 1 seed Xavier Malisse 6–1, 7–6^{(2)} to qualify. In the main draw, he lost to eventual semifinalist and fourth seed Tomáš Berdych 2–6, 4–6 in the first round.

He was given a wildcard to the 2010 Medibank International Sydney and was defeated by Marcos Baghdatis 2–6, 5–7. He also fell in the first round of the 2010 Australian Open to Jarkko Nieminen 6–2, 7–5, 6–4.

Lindahl's American spring of 2010 was fairly successful including two ATP qualifications in Del Ray Beach and Houston, however he fell in the opening round to Florian Mayer and Xavier Malisse respectively. In November 2010 he decided to play under the Swedish flag. In July 2011 he decided to play under the Australian flag again.

== Match-fixing scandal ==
In December 2014, Lindahl's friend, Matthew Fox was convicted of using improper information to bet on matches. Fox alleged that Lindahl told him that he would throw a match in Toowoomba in September 2013. Lindahl retired from the sport shortly after the incident. It was also alleged that Lindahl asked Adam Feeney to lose in the first round of the Traralgon Challenger.

In January 2017, Lindahl was found guilty of charges of contriving or attempting to contrive the outcome of an event, and failing to cooperate with a Tennis Integrity Unit's investigation. He was given a seven-year ban and fined $49,000 for involvement that date back to an ITF Futures tournament in Toowoomba in September 2013.

== ATP Challenger and ITF Futures finals ==
=== Singles: 16 (6–10) ===
Legend ATP Challenger (0–1) ITF Futures (6–9)	Finals by surface Hard (5–9) Clay (1–1) Grass (0–0) Carpet (0–0)

Result	W–L	Date	Tournament	Tier	Surface	Opponent	Score
Loss	0–1	Jul 2006	USA F18, Joplin	Futures	Hard	(Australia) Shannon Nettle	7–6^{(7–4)}, 6–7^{(1–7)}, 2–6
Loss	0–2	Aug 2006	Thailand F5, Nonthaburi	Futures	Hard	(South Korea) Chung Hee-Seok	1–6, 1–6
Win	1–2	Sep 2006	Australia F6, Mackay	Futures	Hard	(Australia) Sadik Kadir	2–6, 6–4, 6–4
Loss	1–3	Mar 2007	New Zealand F1, Wellington	Futures	Hard	(South Korea) Im Kyu-Tae	4–6, 1–6
Loss	1–4	Mar 2007	New Zealand F2, Hamilton	Futures	Hard	(New Zealand) Simon Rea	5–7, 6–3, 4–6
Loss	1–5	Jul 2007	USA F17, Peoria	Futures	Clay	(United States) Michael Yani	7–6^{(7–5)}, 3–6, 2–6
Win	2–5	Sep 2007	Indonesia F4, Manado	Futures	Hard	(Australia) Colin Ebelthite	6–4, ret.
Win	3–5	Oct 2007	Australia F8, Traralgon	Futures	Hard	(Croatia) Vjekoslav Skenderovic	6–1, 7–5
Win	4–5	Sep 2008	Australia F5, Rockhampton	Futures	Hard	(Australia) Brendan McKenzie	6–1, 6–2
Loss	4–6	Sep 2008	Australia F7, Gympie	Futures	Hard	(Australia) Andrew Coelho	3–6, 4–6
Win	5–6	Oct 2008	Australia F9, Sale	Futures	Clay	(Australia) Marinko Matosevic	6–4, 6–0
Loss	5–7	Jul 2009	Aptos, United States	Challenger	Hard	(Australia) Chris Guccione	3–6, 4–6
Loss	5–8	Oct 2010	Australia F8, Port Pirie	Futures	Hard	(Australia) Colin Ebelthite	6–3, 5–7, 3–6
Win	6–8	Oct 2010	Australia F9, Happy Valley	Futures	Hard	(Australia) Brydan Klein	7–6^{(7–5)}, 6–3
Loss	6–9	Sep 2011	Australia F7, Darwin	Futures	Hard	(Australia) Isaac Frost	1–6, 6–4, 4–6
Loss	6–10	Apr 2012	Vietnam F1, Ho Chi Minh City	Futures	Hard	(New Zealand) Jose Statham	2–5 ret.

=== Doubles: 5 (3–2) ===
Legend ATP Challenger (0–0) ITF Futures (3–2)	Finals by surface Hard (3–1) Clay (0–1) Grass (0–0) Carpet (0–0)

Result	W–L	Date	Tournament	Tier	Surface	Partner	Opponents	Score
Loss	0–1	Mar 2007	New Zealand F1, Wellington	Futures	Hard	(Australia) Colin Ebelthite	(Australia) Carsten Ball (Australia) Adam Feeney	6–4, 2–6, 6–7^{(5–7)}
Loss	0–2	Oct 2007	Australia F6, Sawtell	Futures	Clay	(Australia) Marinko Matosevic	(Australia) Miles Armstrong (Australia) Strahinja Bobusic	walkover
Win	1–2	Sep 2012	Australia F5, Cairns	Futures	Hard	(Australia) Adam Feeney	(Australia) Jay Andrijic (Australia) Andrew Whittington	6–3, 7–5
Win	2–2	Sep 2012	Australia F6, Alice Springs	Futures	Hard	(Australia) Adam Feeney	(Australia) Sam Groth (New Zealand) Michael Venus	4–6, 6–2, [10–8]
Win	3–2	May 2013	Greece F8, Athens	Futures	Hard	(Australia) Colin Ebelthite	(United Kingdom) Joseph Gill (United Kingdom) Bruce Strachan	4–6, 6–2, [10–5]

== Performance timeline ==
Key
W	F	SF	QF	#R	RR	Q#	DNQ	A	NH

(W) winner; (F) finalist; (SF) semifinalist; (QF) quarterfinalist; (#R) rounds 4, 3, 2, 1; (RR) round-robin stage; (Q#) qualification round; (DNQ) did not qualify; (A) absent; (NH) not held; (SR) strike rate (events won / competed); (W–L) win–loss record.

=== Singles ===
Tournament	2006	2007	2008	2009	2010	2011	SR	W–L	Win %
Grand Slam tournaments
Australian Open	Q1	Q1	1R	Q1	1R	Q1	0 / 2	0–2	0%
French Open	A	A	A	A	Q1	A	0 / 0	0–0	–
Wimbledon	A	Q1	A	A	A	A	0 / 0	0–0	–
US Open	A	Q1	A	Q1	Q1	A	0 / 0	0–0	–
Win–loss	0–0	0–0	0–1	0–0	0–1	0–0	0 / 2	0–2	0%

== Junior Grand Slam finals ==
=== Singles: 1 (1 runner-up) ===
Result	Year	Tournament	Surface	Opponent	Score
Loss	2006	Australian Open	Hard	(France) Alexandre Sidorenko	3–6, 6–7^{(4–7)}
