= Yangzi (disambiguation) =

Yangzi is the pinyin spelling of the Yangtze.

Yangzi may also refer to:

== People ==
- Yang Zhu, also known as Yangzi (Master Yang), ancient Chinese philosopher
- Yang Xiong (author), also known as Yangzi (Master Yang), Han dynasty scholar

== Places ==
- Yangzi, Hubei (洋梓镇), town in Zhongxiang
- Yangzi, Jiangxi (杨椊镇), town in Pengze County
- Yangzi Subdistrict, Chuzhou (扬子街道), in Langya District, Chuzhou, Anhui
- Yangzi Subdistrict, Weifang (央子街道), in Hanting District, Weifang, Shandong

== See also ==
- Yang Zi (disambiguation)
