= Stefania Boffa =

Swiss tennis player

- Country (sports): Switzerland
- Born: 9 August 1988 (age 36)
- Retired: 2010
- Plays: Right-handed (two-handed backhand)
- Prize money: $50,066

Singles
- Career record: 147–127
- Career titles: 1 ITF
- Highest ranking: No. 307 (15 June 2009)

Doubles
- Career record: 75–61
- Career titles: 4 ITF
- Highest ranking: No. 194 (4 May 2009)

Stefania Boffa (born 9 August 1988) is a former tennis player from Switzerland. She has a career-high singles ranking of 307, and a doubles ranking of 194. She played for the Swiss Fed Cup team once in 2006, and retired from tennis 2010.

== ITF Circuit finals ==
Legend
$25,000 tournaments
$10,000 tournaments

=== Singles: 5 (1 title, 4 runner-ups) ===
Result	No.	Date	Tournament	Surface	Opponent	Score
Loss	1.	21 September 2004	ITF Ciampino, Italy	Clay	(Hungary) Ágnes Szávay	0–6, 2–6
Loss	2.	12 June 2006	ITF Lenzerheide, Switzerland	Clay	(Bosnia and Herzegovina) Sandra Martinović	4–6, 3–6
Win	1.	3 December 2006	ITF Havana, Cuba	Hard	(Guatemala) Melissa Morales	6–1, 3–6, 6–3
Loss	3.	18 June 2007	ITF Alcobaça, Portugal	Hard	(Canada) Mélanie Gloria	3–6, 3–6
Loss	4.	10 November 2008	ITF Jersey, United Kingdom	Hard	(Poland) Katarzyna Piter	2–6, 2–6

=== Doubles: 12 (4 titles, 8 runner-ups) ===
Result	No.	Date	Tournament	Surface	Partner	Opponents	Score
Win	1.	1 October 2006	ITF Jakarta, Indonesia	Hard	(Hong Kong) Zhang Ling	(Indonesia) Sandy Gumulya (Indonesia) Lavinia Tananta	6–4, 6–4
Win	2.	16 March 2007	ITF Athens, Greece	Clay	(Romania) Raluca Ciulei	(Switzerland) Karin Hechenberger (Italy) Giorgia Mortello	6–0, 7–6^{(0)}
Loss	1.	5 May 2008	ITF Irapuato, Mexico	Clay	(Czech Republic) Nikola Fraňková	(United Kingdom) Sarah Borwell (United States) Robin Stephenson	4–6, 6–3, [4–10]
Loss	2.	12 May 2008	ITF Raleigh, United States	Clay	(Austria) Nicole Rottmann	(Georgia (country)) Anna Tatishvili (United States) Kimberly Couts	3–6, 4–6
Loss	3.	19 May 2008	ITF Landisville, United States	Clay	(United Kingdom) Anna Fitzpatrick	(Canada) Heidi El Tabakh (United States) Audra Cohen	3–6, 6–7
Loss	4.	16 June 2008	ITF Istanbul, Turkey	Hard	(Czech Republic) Nikola Fraňková	(Serbia) Teodora Mirčić (Slovakia) Lenka Tvarošková	5–7, 6–7
Loss	5.	7 July 2008	ITF Valladolid, Spain	Hard	(United Kingdom) Anna Fitzpatrick	(Canada) Heidi El Tabakh (United States) Story Tweedie-Yates	2–6, 4–6
Win	3.	26 October 2008	GB Pro Series Glasgow, UK	Hard	(United Kingdom) Amanda Elliott	(Romania) Laura Ioana Andrei (Romania) Irina-Camelia Begu	6–4, 7–6^{(3)}
Loss	6.	24 November 2008	ITF La Vall d'Uixó, Spain	Hard	(Switzerland) Conny Perrin	(Spain) Lucía Sainz (United States) Ashley Weinhold	2–6, 3–6
Win	4.	21 March 2009	ITF Bath, United Kingdom	Hard	(United Kingdom) Anna Fitzpatrick	(Czech Republic) Veronika Chvojková (Czech Republic) Kateřina Vaňková	6–1, 6–1
Loss	7.	13 April 2009	ITF Tessenderlo, Belgium	Hard	(Croatia) Darija Jurak	(France) Yulia Fedossova (France) Virginie Pichet	5–7, 3–6
Loss	8.	15 June 2009	Open Montpellier, France	Hard	(United States) Story Tweedie-Yates	(Ukraine) Yuliya Beygelzimer (Germany) Laura Siegemund	4–6, 1–6
