= Austen Childs =

New Zealand tennis player

- Full name: Austen Denis Childs
- Country (sports): New Zealand
- Born: 23 February 1989 (age 36); Mount Maunganui, New Zealand
- Height: 5 ft 11 in (180 cm)
- Plays: Right-handed

Singles
- Career record: 1–0 (Davis Cup)
- Highest ranking: No. 1504 (20 Mar 2006)

Austen Denis Childs (born 23 February 1989) is a New Zealand former tennis player.

Childs grew up in Mount Maunganui and was ranked amongst the world's top 50 players on the ITF Junior circuit, with a quarter-final appearance at the Australian Open a highlight.

Instead of professional tennis, Childs opted to attend college at the University of Louisville in Kentucky and play collegiate tennis. As a junior in 2010 and unseeded, he became the first New Zealander to make an NCAA Division I Championship final. He was beaten in the final by Bradley Klahn of Stanford.

Two-weeks after making the NCAA final he was called into the New Zealand Davis Cup team, captained by his childhood coach Marcel Vos, for a tie against Pakistan in Taranaki. Considered a surprise selection, Childs was used for the deciding fifth rubber, picked ahead of Michael Venus who had earlier played a lengthy match in losing to Aisam-ul-Haq Qureshi. Childs was able to defeat Aqeel Khan in straight sets to secure the tie for New Zealand.

== See also ==
- List of New Zealand Davis Cup team representatives
