= 2006 Australian Open – Women's doubles =

Women's doubles
- 2006 Australian Open

Final
- Champion: (China) Yan Zi (China) Zheng Jie
- Runner-up: (United States) Lisa Raymond (Australia) Samantha Stosur
- Score: 2–6, 7–6^{(9–7)}, 6–3

Details
- Draw: 64
- Seeds: 16

Events
Singles	men	women		boys	girls
Doubles	men	women	mixed	boys	girls
WC Singles	men	women	quad
WC Doubles	men	women	quad
Legends	men	women	mixed
- Australian Open

Twelfth-seeded Yan Zi and Zheng Jie defeated first-seeded Lisa Raymond and Samantha Stosur, 2–6, 7–6^{(9–7)}, 6–3 to win the women's doubles title at the 2006 Australian Open.

== Seeds ==
1. (United States) Lisa Raymond / (Australia) Samantha Stosur (final)
2. (Zimbabwe) Cara Black / (Australia) Rennae Stubbs (quarterfinals)
3. (Russia) Elena Likhovtseva / (Russia) Vera Zvonareva (quarterfinals)
4. (Spain) Virginia Ruano Pascual / (Argentina) Paola Suárez (quarterfinals)
5. (Germany) Anna-Lena Grönefeld / (United States) Meghann Shaughnessy (semifinals)
6. (Slovakia) Daniela Hantuchová / (Japan) Ai Sugiyama (third round)
7. (Russia) Elena Dementieva / (Italy) Flavia Pennetta (third round)
8. (South Africa) Liezel Huber / (Italy) Francesca Schiavone (third round)
9. (Japan) Shinobu Asagoe / (Slovenia) Katarina Srebotnik (semifinals)
10. (Argentina) Gisela Dulko / (Russia) Maria Kirilenko (quarterfinals)
11. (France) Émilie Loit / (Australia) Nicole Pratt (third round)
12. (China) Yan Zi / (China) Zheng Jie (champions)
13. (Russia) Anastasia Myskina / (Russia) Dinara Safina (second round)
14. (Russia) Svetlana Kuznetsova / (France) Amélie Mauresmo (third round, withdrew)
15. (Greece) Eleni Daniilidou / (Spain) Anabel Medina Garrigues (first round)
16. (China) Li Ting / (China) Sun Tiantian (third round)

== Draw ==
Key

- Q = Qualifier
- WC = Wild card
- LL = Lucky loser
- Alt = Alternate
- ITF = ITF entry
- PR = Protected ranking
- SR = Special ranking
- SE = Special exempt
- JE = Junior exempt
- JR = Junior Accelerator Programme entrant
- CO = College Accelerator Programme entrant
- NG = Next Gen Accelerator Program entrant
- w/o = Walkover
- r = Retired
- d = Defaulted

=== Finals ===
Quarterfinals
1	(United States) Lisa Raymond (Australia) Samantha Stosur	6	6
10	(Argentina) Gisela Dulko (Russia) Maria Kirilenko	3	2
3	(Russia) Elena Likhovtseva (Russia) Vera Zvonareva	3	3
5	(Germany) Anna-Lena Grönefeld (United States) Meghann Shaughnessy	6	6
12	(China) Yan Zi (China) Zheng Jie	4	7	6
4	(Spain) Virginia Ruano Pascual (Argentina) Paola Suárez	6	5	1
9	(Japan) Shinobu Asagoe (Slovenia) Katarina Srebotnik	6	4	6
2	(Zimbabwe) Cara Black (Australia) Rennae Stubbs	3	6	0

Semifinals
1	(United States) Lisa Raymond (Australia) Samantha Stosur	6	6
5	(Germany) Anna-Lena Grönefeld (United States) Meghann Shaughnessy	2	4
12	(China) Yan Zi (China) Zheng Jie	6	7
9	(Japan) Shinobu Asagoe (Slovenia) Katarina Srebotnik	2	6

Final
1	(United States) Lisa Raymond (Australia) Samantha Stosur	6	6	3
12	(China) Yan Zi (China) Zheng Jie	2	7	6

=== Top half ===
==== Section 1 ====
First round
1	(United States) L Raymond (Australia) S Stosur	6	4	6
(Spain) N Llagostera Vives (Venezuela) M Vento-Kabchi	3	6	1
(Estonia) M Ani (Romania) A Vanc	6	7
(Chinese Taipei) C-j Chuang (Japan) R Fujiwara	2	5
(Czech Republic) G Navrátilová (Czech Republic) M Paštiková	6	6	1
WC	(Australia) C Dellacqua (Australia) T Musgrave	7	2	6
(Ukraine) Y Beygelzimer (Bosnia and Herzegovina) M Jugić-Salkić	4	6	4
16	(China) T Li (China) T Sun	6	4	6
10	(Argentina) G Dulko (Russia) M Kirilenko	6	6
(Madagascar) D Randriantefy (Israel) A Smashnova	2	2
WC	(Australia) M Adamczak (Australia) C Horiatopoulos	7	3	6
(Australia) L McShea (Australia) B Stewart	6	6	4
(China) N Li (China) S Peng	6	6
(Argentina) ME Salerni (Venezuela) M Sequera	2	3
(Czech Republic) B Strýcová (Czech Republic) N Vaidišová	5	3
6	(Slovakia) D Hantuchová (Japan) A Sugiyama	7	6

Second round
1	(United States) L Raymond (Australia) S Stosur	6	6
(Estonia) M Ani (Romania) A Vanc	1	3
WC	(Australia) C Dellacqua (Australia) T Musgrave	5	4
16	(China) T Li (China) T Sun	7	6
10	(Argentina) G Dulko (Russia) M Kirilenko	6	6
WC	(Australia) M Adamczak (Australia) C Horiatopoulos	3	2
(China) N Li (China) S Peng	4	3
6	(Slovakia) D Hantuchová (Japan) A Sugiyama	6	6

Third round
1	(United States) L Raymond (Australia) S Stosur	6	6
16	(China) T Li (China) T Sun	3	4
10	(Argentina) G Dulko (Russia) M Kirilenko	6	6
6	(Slovakia) D Hantuchová (Japan) A Sugiyama	1	1

Quarterfinals
1	(United States) L Raymond (Australia) S Stosur	6	6
10	(Argentina) G Dulko (Russia) M Kirilenko	3	2

==== Section 2 ====
First round
3	(Russia) E Likhovtseva (Russia) V Zvonareva	6	6
WC	(Australia) B Sekulovski (Australia) C Watson	2	3
Alt	(Finland) E Laine (Czech Republic) H Šromová	4	3
(Ukraine) V Kutuzova (Russia) A Rodionova	6	6
(Germany) S Klösel (Ukraine) M Koryttseva	1	0
(France) S Foretz (Italy) A Serra Zanetti	6	6
(Russia) E Bychkova (Czech Republic) Z Ondrášková	4	3
13	(Russia) A Myskina (Russia) D Safina	6	6
11	(France) É Loit (Australia) N Pratt	6	0	6
(Russia) A Chakvetadze (Russia) E Vesnina	3	6	1
WC	(Australia) L Breadmore (Australia) D Dominikovic	1	3
(Puerto Rico) K Brandi (Colombia) C Castaño	6	6
(Germany) J Schruff (Germany) J Wöhr	5	3
WC	(Australia) S Ferguson (Australia) C Wheeler	7	6
(Czech Republic) E Birnerová (Italy) M Santangelo	4	1
5	(Germany) A-L Grönefeld (United States) M Shaughnessy	6	6

Second round
3	(Russia) E Likhovtseva (Russia) V Zvonareva	6	6
(Ukraine) V Kutuzova (Russia) A Rodionova	3	2
(France) S Foretz (Italy) A Serra Zanetti	4	6	7
13	(Russia) A Myskina (Russia) D Safina	6	4	6
11	(France) É Loit (Australia) N Pratt	7	6
(Puerto Rico) K Brandi (Colombia) C Castaño	5	2
WC	(Australia) S Ferguson (Australia) C Wheeler	1	0
5	(Germany) A-L Grönefeld (United States) M Shaughnessy	6	6

Third round
3	(Russia) E Likhovtseva (Russia) V Zvonareva	6	6
(France) S Foretz (Italy) A Serra Zanetti	2	1
11	(France) É Loit (Australia) N Pratt	6	3	1
5	(Germany) A-L Grönefeld (United States) M Shaughnessy	4	6	6

Quarterfinals
3	(Russia) E Likhovtseva (Russia) V Zvonareva	3	3
5	(Germany) A-L Grönefeld (United States) M Shaughnessy	6	6

=== Bottom half ===
==== Section 3 ====
First round
7	(Russia) E Dementieva (Italy) F Pennetta	6	7	6
(United States) L Granville (United States) A Spears	7	5	0
(Italy) ME Camerin (Italy) T Garbin	6	6
(Czech Republic) K Koukalová (Czech Republic) L Šafářová	2	2
(Sweden) S Arvidsson (Austria) S Bammer	3	4
(Spain) L Domínguez Lino (Spain) M Sánchez Lorenzo	6	6
(Russia) E Linetskaya (Russia) G Voskoboeva	1	0
12	(China) Z Yan (China) J Zheng	6	6
14	(Russia) S Kuznetsova (France) A Mauresmo	6	6
(India) S Mirza (United States) C Morariu	2	1
(South Korea) Y-j Cho (Japan) A Nakamura	4	2
(France) S Brémond (Tunisia) S Sfar	6	6
(United States) J Craybas (United States) M Tu	6	6
WC	(Australia) S McDowell (Australia) J Moore	3	0
(Russia) V Dushevina (Israel) S Pe'er	4	5
4	(Spain) V Ruano Pascual (Argentina) P Suárez	6	7

Second round
7	(Russia) E Dementieva (Italy) F Pennetta	7	4	6
(Italy) ME Camerin (Italy) T Garbin	5	6	3
(Spain) L Domínguez Lino (Spain) M Sánchez Lorenzo	4	0
12	(China) Z Yan (China) J Zheng	6	6
14	(Russia) S Kuznetsova (France) A Mauresmo	6	6
(France) S Brémond (Tunisia) S Sfar	3	1
(United States) J Craybas (United States) M Tu	7	4	3
4	(Spain) V Ruano Pascual (Argentina) P Suárez	5	6	6

Third round
7	(Russia) E Dementieva (Italy) F Pennetta	1	2
12	(China) Z Yan (China) J Zheng	6	6
14	(Russia) S Kuznetsova (France) A Mauresmo
4	(Spain) V Ruano Pascual (Argentina) P Suárez	w/o

Quarterfinals
12	(China) Z Yan (China) J Zheng	4	7	6
4	(Spain) V Ruano Pascual (Argentina) P Suárez	6	5	1

==== Section 4 ====
First round
8	(South Africa) L Huber (Italy) F Schiavone	6	4	6
(Czech Republic) I Benešová (Croatia) J Kostanić	2	6	3
(Switzerland) E Gagliardi (Croatia) K Šprem	6	3	6
(Slovenia) T Križan (United States) J Russell	3	6	2
WC	(Chinese Taipei) S-w Hsieh (Thailand) T Tanasugarn	7	6
(Poland) M Domachowska (Italy) R Vinci	5	0
(Czech Republic) D Chládková (France) V Razzano	2	2
9	(Japan) S Asagoe (Slovenia) K Srebotnik	6	6
15	(Greece) E Daniilidou (Spain) A Medina Garrigues	5	6	4
(Netherlands) M Krajicek (Hungary) Á Szávay	7	4	6
(Serbia and Montenegro) J Janković (Croatia) S Talaja	6	3	3
(France) N Dechy (France) T Golovin	1	6	6
(Latvia) L Dekmeijere (Argentina) M Díaz Oliva	2	0
(United States) A Frazier (Chinese Taipei) J Lee	6	6
(Spain) L Pous Tió (United States) M Washington	2	1
2	(Zimbabwe) C Black (Australia) R Stubbs	6	6

Second round
8	(South Africa) L Huber (Italy) F Schiavone	0	6	6
(Switzerland) E Gagliardi (Croatia) K Šprem	6	3	0
WC	(Chinese Taipei) S-w Hsieh (Thailand) T Tanasugarn	6	2
9	(Japan) S Asagoe (Slovenia) K Srebotnik	7	6
(Netherlands) M Krajicek (Hungary) Á Szávay	6	6	6
(France) N Dechy (France) T Golovin	2	7	3
(United States) A Frazier (Chinese Taipei) J Lee	1	4
2	(Zimbabwe) C Black (Australia) R Stubbs	6	6

Third round
8	(South Africa) L Huber (Italy) F Schiavone	4	6	6
9	(Japan) S Asagoe (Slovenia) K Srebotnik	6	3	7
(Netherlands) M Krajicek (Hungary) Á Szávay	4	1
2	(Zimbabwe) C Black (Australia) R Stubbs	6	6

Quarterfinals
9	(Japan) S Asagoe (Slovenia) K Srebotnik	6	4	6
2	(Zimbabwe) C Black (Australia) R Stubbs	3	6	0
