= Marrit Boonstra =

Dutch tennis player

- Country (sports): Netherlands
- Born: 25 September 1988 (age 36); Groningen, Netherlands
- Plays: Right (two-handed backhand)
- Prize money: $14,062

Singles
- Career record: 35–25
- Career titles: 1 ITF
- Highest ranking: No. 556 (26 June 2006)

Doubles
- Career record: 38–11
- Career titles: 5 ITF
- Highest ranking: No. 468 (19 June 2006)

Marrit Boonstra (born 25 September 1988) is a former professional tennis player from the Netherlands.

== Biography ==
Boonstra, who was born in Groningen, played tennis as a right-hander with a two-handed backhand.

Her junior career included a win over Caroline Wozniacki, whom she also partnered to make the girls' doubles quarterfinals of the 2006 Wimbledon Championships.

As a 17-year-old, she played three doubles rubbers for the Netherlands in the 2006 Fed Cup competition, teaming up with Dutch veteran Brenda Schultz-McCarthy to win all three matches.

Boonstra received a wildcard to compete in the main draw of the 2006 Ordina Open, a WTA Tour tournament in Rosmalen. She lost in the opening round to Jelena Janković.

From 2008 to 2010, she played collegiate tennis in the United States for the University of Florida.

During her time on the ITF Circuit, she won one singles title and five doubles titles.

== ITF finals ==
=== Singles (1–2) ===
Outcome	No.	Date	Location	Surface	Opponent	Score
Runner-up	1.	26 June 2005	Alkmaar, Netherlands	Clay	(Georgia (country)) Ia Jikia	4–6, 1–6
Runner-up	2.	3 July 2005	Heerhugowaard, Netherlands	Clay	(Netherlands) Kelly de Beer	2–6, 1–6
Winner	1.	7 May 2006	Bournemouth, United Kingdom	Clay	(Bulgaria) Biljana Pawlowa-Dimitrova	6–3, 6–0

=== Doubles (5–4) ===
Outcome	No.	Date	Location	Surface	Partner	Opponents	Score
Runner-up	1.	3 July 2005	Heerhugowaard, Netherlands	Clay	(Netherlands) Nicole Thyssen	(Ukraine) Kristina Antoniychuk (Montenegro) Ana Veselinović	6–1, 2–6, 5–7
Runner-up	2.	27 September 2005	Benevento, Italy	Hard	(Netherlands) Nicole Thyssen	(Poland) Dorota Hibental (Russia) Alexandra Karavaeva	w/o
Winner	1.	26 November 2005	Ashkelon, Israel	Hard	(Netherlands) Nicole Thyssen	(Austria) Verena Amesbauer (Germany) Mariella Greschik	6–3, 6–2
Winner	2.	3 December 2005	Ramat HaSharon, Israel	Hard	(Netherlands) Nicole Thyssen	(Spain) Gabriela Velasco Andreu (Turkey) Pemra Özgen	6–2, 6–3
Winner	3.	10 December 2005	Raanana, Israel	Hard	(Netherlands) Nicole Thyssen	(Russia) Aleksandra Kulikova (Russia) Natalia Orlova	7–5, 6–3
Winner	4.	7 May 2006	Bournemouth, United Kingdom	Clay	(Netherlands) Bibiane Schoofs	(Russia) Maya Gaverova (Russia) Anastasia Poltoratskaya	6–4, 1–6, 6–4
Runner-up	3.	3 December 2006	Tel Aviv, Israel	Hard	(Netherlands) Renée Reinhard	(Austria) Eva-Maria Hoch (Montenegro) Ana Veselinović	4–6, 6–7
Winner	5.	18 February 2007	Montechoro, Portugal	Hard	(Netherlands) Nicole Thyssen	(United States) Jessica Lehnhoff (United States) Robin Stephenson	6–3, 3–6, 6–2
Runner-up	4.	17 June 2012	Meppel, Netherlands	Clay	(Germany) Vivian Heisen	(Belgium) Ysaline Bonaventure (Netherlands) Nicolette van Uitert	1–6, 6–4, [7–10]

== See also ==
- List of Netherlands Fed Cup team representatives
