= 2006 Australian Open – Men's doubles =

Men's doubles
- 2006 Australian Open

Final
- Champion: (United States) Bob Bryan (United States) Mike Bryan
- Runner-up: (Czech Republic) Martin Damm (India) Leander Paes
- Score: 4–6, 6–3, 6–4

Details
- Draw: 64
- Seeds: 16

Events
Singles	men	women		boys	girls
Doubles	men	women	mixed	boys	girls
WC Singles	men	women	quad
WC Doubles	men	women	quad
Legends	men	women	mixed
- Australian Open

First-seeded Bob Bryan and Mike Bryan defeated seventh-seeded Martin Damm and Leander Paes 4–6, 6–3, 6–4 to win the men's doubles title at the 2006 Australian Open.

== Seeds ==
1. (United States) Bob Bryan / (United States) Mike Bryan (champions)
2. (Sweden) Jonas Björkman / (Belarus) Max Mirnyi (quarterfinals)
3. (The Bahamas) Mark Knowles / (Canada) Daniel Nestor (first round)
4. (Australia) Paul Hanley / (Zimbabwe) Kevin Ullyett (semifinals)
5. (France) Fabrice Santoro / (Serbia and Montenegro) Nenad Zimonjić (third round)
6. (Israel) Jonathan Erlich / (Israel) Andy Ram (second round)
7. (Czech Republic) Martin Damm / (India) Leander Paes (final)
8. (Sweden) Simon Aspelin / (Australia) Todd Perry (quarterfinals)
9. (Australia) Wayne Arthurs / Stephen Huss (first round)
10. (Czech Republic) František Čermák / (Czech Republic) Leoš Friedl (second round)
11. (India) Mahesh Bhupathi / (South Africa) Wesley Moodie (third round)
12. (Austria) Julian Knowle / (Austria) Jürgen Melzer (third round)
13. (Argentina) José Acasuso / (Argentina) Sebastián Prieto (third round)
14. (Australia) Jordan Kerr / (United States) Travis Parrott (third round)
15. (Slovakia) Dominik Hrbatý / (Slovakia) Michal Mertiňák (second round)
16. (Czech Republic) Tomáš Berdych / (Czech Republic) Cyril Suk (third round)

== Draw ==
Key

- Q = Qualifier
- WC = Wild card
- LL = Lucky loser
- Alt = Alternate
- ITF = ITF entry
- PR = Protected ranking
- SR = Special ranking
- SE = Special exempt
- JE = Junior exempt
- JR = Junior Accelerator Programme entrant
- CO = College Accelerator Programme entrant
- NG = Next Gen Accelerator Program entrant
- w/o = Walkover
- r = Retired
- d = Defaulted

=== Finals ===
Quarterfinals
1	(United States) Bob Bryan (United States) Mike Bryan	6	3	6
(Czech Republic) Jan Hernych (Croatia) Ivo Karlović	3	6	1
4	(Australia) Paul Hanley (Zimbabwe) Kevin Ullyett	6	4	6
8	(Sweden) Simon Aspelin (Australia) Todd Perry	3	6	3
(Poland) Mariusz Fyrstenberg (Poland) Marcin Matkowski	6	3	6
(Australia) Ashley Fisher (United States) Justin Gimelstob	2	6	3
7	(Czech Republic) Martin Damm (India) Leander Paes	3	6	6
2	(Sweden) Jonas Björkman (Belarus) Max Mirnyi	6	3	4

Semifinals
1	(United States) Bob Bryan (United States) Mike Bryan	6	6
4	(Australia) Paul Hanley (Zimbabwe) Kevin Ullyett	3	4
(Poland) Mariusz Fyrstenberg (Poland) Marcin Matkowski	2	4
7	(Czech Republic) Martin Damm (India) Leander Paes	6	6

Final
1	(United States) Bob Bryan (United States) Mike Bryan	4	6	6
7	(Czech Republic) Martin Damm (India) Leander Paes	6	3	4

=== Top half ===
==== Section 1 ====
First round
1	(United States) B Bryan (United States) M Bryan	6	6
(Romania) V Hănescu (Romania) A Pavel	1	4
(Argentina) JI Chela (Argentina) G Gaudio	6	6
(Cyprus) M Baghdatis (Czech Republic) D Škoch	1	2
(United States) P Goldstein (United States) J Thomas	5	6	6
(Australia) C Ball (Australia) A Coelho	7	2	7
(Argentina) G Etlis (United States) R Ram	5	7	4
14	(Australia) J Kerr (United States) T Parrott	7	6	6
9	(Australia) W Arthurs (Australia) S Huss	6	4
(Czech Republic) J Hernych (Croatia) I Karlović	7	6
(Czech Republic) T Cibulec (Czech Republic) P Pála	1	6	1
(Sweden) R Lindstedt (Finland) J Nieminen	6	4	6
(Australia) P Baccanello (Australia) R Smeets	6	7
(United States) R Ginepri (United States) B Reynolds	4	6
(Argentina) J Mónaco (Spain) A Montañés	3	2
6	(Israel) J Erlich (Israel) A Ram	6	6

Second round
1	(United States) B Bryan (United States) M Bryan	w	/	o
(Argentina) JI Chela (Argentina) G Gaudio
(Australia) C Ball (Australia) A Coelho	3	5
14	(Australia) J Kerr (United States) T Parrott	6	7
(Czech Republic) J Hernych (Croatia) I Karlović	5	6	7
(Sweden) R Lindstedt (Finland) J Nieminen	7	3	6
(Australia) P Baccanello (Australia) R Smeets	6	1	7
6	(Israel) J Erlich (Israel) A Ram	4	6	6

Third round
1	(United States) B Bryan (United States) M Bryan	6	7
14	(Australia) J Kerr (United States) T Parrott	2	5
(Czech Republic) J Hernych (Croatia) I Karlović	7	5	7
(Australia) P Baccanello (Australia) R Smeets	6	7	6

Quarterfinals
1	(United States) B Bryan (United States) M Bryan	6	3	6
(Czech Republic) J Hernych (Croatia) I Karlović	3	6	1

=== Section 2 ===
First round
4	(Australia) P Hanley (Zimbabwe) K Ullyett	6	3	6
(Czech Republic) R Vik (Czech Republic) T Zíb	3	6	1
(South Africa) J Coetzee (Netherlands) R Wassen	3	6	6
(Australia) C Guccione (Australia) N Healey	6	4	4
(Czech Republic) I Minář (Czech Republic) J Vaněk	6	1	7
(Australia) S Kadir (Australia) T Reid	2	6	5
(France) T Ascione (France) F Serra	0	6	3
16	(Czech Republic) T Berdych (Czech Republic) C Suk	6	3	6
12	(Austria) J Knowle (Austria) J Melzer	6	6
(France) R Gasquet (France) S Grosjean	4	4
(Germany) T Behrend (Brazil) M Daniel	6	3	3
(Belgium) X Malisse (Belgium) O Rochus	2	6	6
(Spain) D Ferrer (Spain) F Vicente	4	6	7
(France) J Benneteau (France) N Mahut	6	3	6
(Argentina) M García (Peru) L Horna	3	4
8	(Sweden) S Aspelin (Australia) T Perry	6	6

Second round
4	(Australia) P Hanley (Zimbabwe) K Ullyett	6	6	6
(South Africa) J Coetzee (Netherlands) R Wassen	7	3	4
(Czech Republic) I Minář (Czech Republic) J Vaněk	5	3
16	(Czech Republic) T Berdych (Czech Republic) C Suk	7	6
12	(Austria) J Knowle (Austria) J Melzer	7	6
(Belgium) X Malisse (Belgium) O Rochus	5	4
(Spain) D Ferrer (Spain) F Vicente	4	6
8	(Sweden) S Aspelin (Australia) T Perry	6	7

Third round
4	(Australia) P Hanley (Zimbabwe) K Ullyett	6	7
16	(Czech Republic) T Berdych (Czech Republic) C Suk	4	6
12	(Austria) J Knowle (Austria) J Melzer	2	4
8	(Sweden) S Aspelin (Australia) T Perry	6	6

Quarterfinals
4	(Australia) P Hanley (Zimbabwe) K Ullyett	6	4	6
8	(Sweden) S Aspelin (Australia) T Perry	3	6	3

=== Bottom half ===
==== Section 3 ====
First round
5	(France) F Santoro (Serbia and Montenegro) N Zimonjić	7	6
(Serbia and Montenegro) N Djokovic (United Kingdom) A Murray	6	3
(Japan) S Iwabuchi (Japan) T Suzuki	6	6
(Spain) F López (Spain) F Verdasco	7	7
(Italy) D Sanguinetti (Italy) P Starace	3	7	1
(Poland) M Fyrstenberg (Poland) M Matkowski	6	6	6
(Germany) R Schüttler (Germany) A Waske	5	2
10	(Czech Republic) F Čermák (Czech Republic) L Friedl	7	6
15	(Slovakia) D Hrbatý (Slovakia) M Mertiňák	6	6
(Italy) G Galimberti (Czech Republic) J Levinský	4	1
(Spain) C Moyá (Argentina) M Zabaleta	2	6
(Australia) A Fisher (United States) J Gimelstob	6	7
(Argentina) C Berlocq (Argentina) A Calleri	7	6	4
(Belgium) C Rochus (Switzerland) S Wawrinka	6	7	6
(Belgium) D Norman (United States) V Spadea	6	7
3	(The Bahamas) M Knowles (Canada) D Nestor	4	6

Second round
5	(France) F Santoro (Serbia and Montenegro) N Zimonjić	6	3	6
(Spain) F López (Spain) F Verdasco	4	6	4
(Poland) M Fyrstenberg (Poland) M Matkowski	6	6
10	(Czech Republic) F Čermák (Czech Republic) L Friedl	2	4
15	(Slovakia) D Hrbatý (Slovakia) M Mertiňák	3	6	3
(Australia) A Fisher (United States) J Gimelstob	6	3	6
(Belgium) C Rochus (Switzerland) S Wawrinka	2	7	6
(Belgium) D Norman (United States) V Spadea	6	6	0

Third round
5	(France) F Santoro (Serbia and Montenegro) N Zimonjić	5	5
(Poland) M Fyrstenberg (Poland) M Matkowski	7	7
(Australia) A Fisher (United States) J Gimelstob	6	3	6
(Belgium) C Rochus (Switzerland) S Wawrinka	3	6	3

Quarterfinals
(Poland) M Fyrstenberg (Poland) M Matkowski	6	3	6
(Australia) A Fisher (United States) J Gimelstob	2	6	3

=== Section 4 ===
First round
7	(Czech Republic) M Damm (India) L Paes	6	6
(Australia) P Luczak (Australia) S Nettle	3	2
(Australia) L Bourgeois (Australia) R Junaid	5	3
(Czech Republic) L Dlouhý (Czech Republic) P Vízner	7	6
(France) A Clément (France) M Llodra	6	6
(Germany) P Kohlschreiber (Germany) F Mayer	4	3
(Italy) D Bracciali (Austria) O Marach	5	3
11	(India) M Bhupathi (South Africa) W Moodie	7	6
13	(Argentina) J Acasuso (Argentina) S Prieto	6	6	7
(Russia) I Andreev (Russia) N Davydenko	7	4	6
(South Africa) C Haggard (Israel) H Levy	6	6
(France) M Gicquel (France) G Monfils	3	2
(Germany) L Burgsmüller (Germany) B Phau	3	2
(Switzerland) Y Allegro (Belgium) K Vliegen	6	6
(Germany) M Kohlmann (Luxembourg) G Müller	5	7	6
2	(Sweden) J Björkman (Belarus) M Mirnyi	7	6	7

Second round
7	(Czech Republic) M Damm (India) L Paes	7	6
(Czech Republic) L Dlouhý (Czech Republic) P Vízner	5	3
(France) A Clément (France) M Llodra	6	6	5
11	(India) M Bhupathi (South Africa) W Moodie	4	7	7
13	(Argentina) J Acasuso (Argentina) S Prieto	6	6
(South Africa) C Haggard (Israel) H Levy	4	4
(Switzerland) Y Allegro (Belgium) K Vliegen	4	1
2	(Sweden) J Björkman (Belarus) M Mirnyi	6	6

Third round
7	(Czech Republic) M Damm (India) L Paes	3	6	6
11	(India) M Bhupathi (South Africa) W Moodie	6	3	2
13	(Argentina) J Acasuso (Argentina) S Prieto	6	5
2	(Sweden) J Björkman (Belarus) M Mirnyi	7	7

Quarterfinals
7	(Czech Republic) M Damm (India) L Paes	3	6	6
(Sweden) J Björkman (Belarus) M Mirnyi	6	3	4
