= 2006 Australian Open =

- Date: 16–29 January 2006
- Edition: 94th
- Category: Grand Slam (ITF)
- Surface: Hardcourt (Rebound Ace)
- Location: Melbourne, Australia
- Venue: Melbourne Park

Champions

Men's singles
- (Switzerland) Roger Federer

Women's singles
- (France) Amélie Mauresmo

Men's doubles
- (United States) Bob Bryan / (United States) Mike Bryan

Women's doubles
- (China) Yan Zi / (China) Zheng Jie

Mixed doubles
- (Switzerland) Martina Hingis / (India) Mahesh Bhupathi

Wheelchair men's singles
- (France) Michaël Jérémiasz

Wheelchair women's singles
- (Netherlands) Esther Vergeer

Wheelchair men's doubles
- (Netherlands) Robin Ammerlaan / (Austria) Martin Legner

Wheelchair women's doubles
- (Netherlands) Esther Vergeer / (Netherlands) Jiske Griffioen

Boys' singles
- (France) Alexandre Sidorenko

Girls' singles
- (Russia) Anastasia Pavlyuchenkova

Boys' doubles
- (Poland) Błażej Koniusz / (Poland) Grzegorz Panfil

Girls' doubles
- (Canada) Sharon Fichman / (Russia) Anastasia Pavlyuchenkova

Men's legends doubles
- (Australia) John Fitzgerald / (Australia) Todd Woodbridge

Legends mixed doubles
- (Australia) Phil Dent / (Australia) Dianne Balestrat
- Australian Open

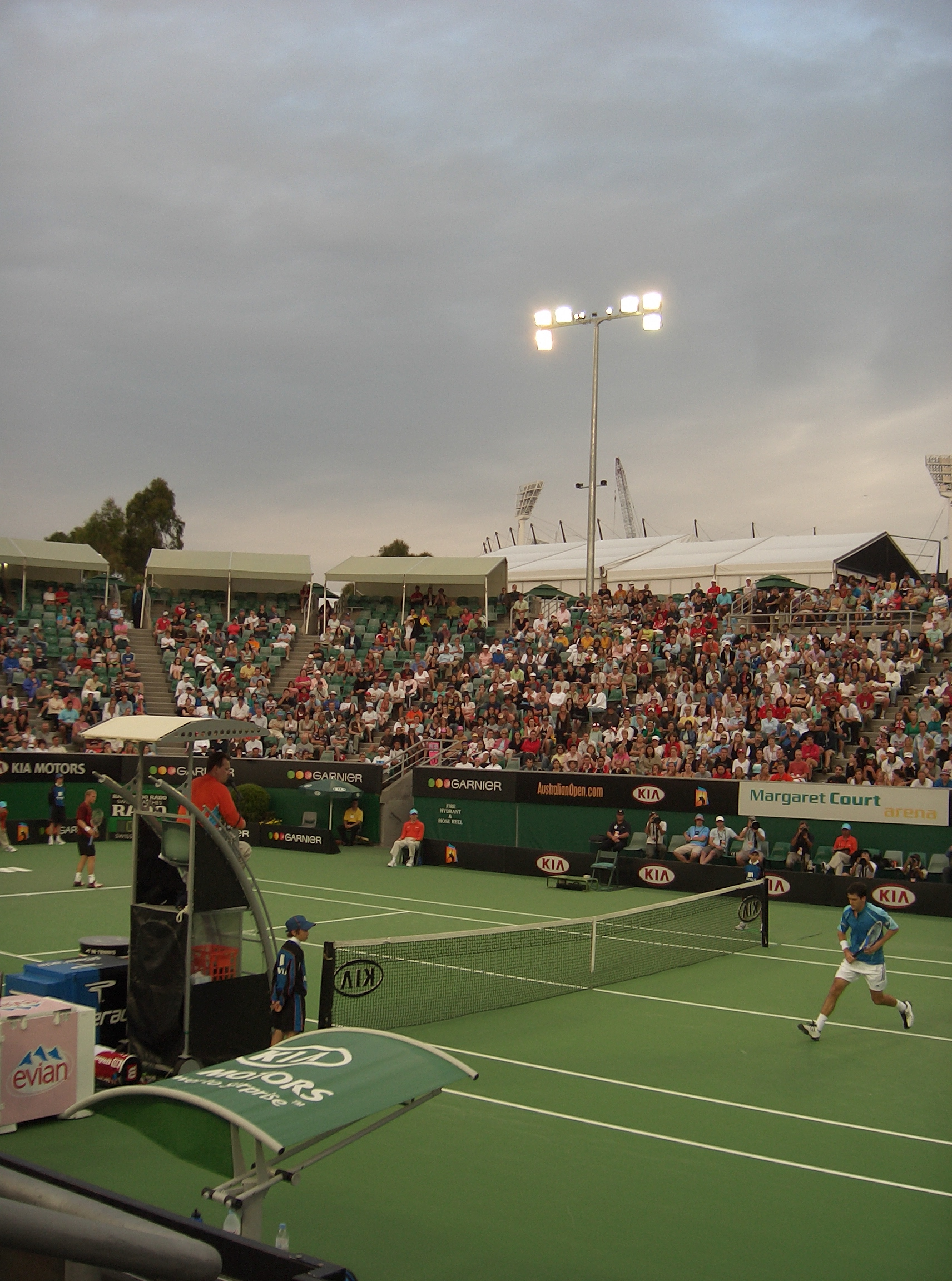
Tim Henman and Dmitry Tursunov playing on the Margaret Court Arena in the first round.

The 2006 Australian Open was played between 16 and 29 January 2006.

Marat Safin could not defend his 2005 title, due to an injury he suffered in late 2005. Roger Federer won his second Australian Open title, defeating Marcos Baghdatis in the final in four sets. Serena Williams was unsuccessful in defending her 2005 title, losing in the third round against Daniela Hantuchová. Amélie Mauresmo won her first Australian Open title, defeating 2004 champion Justine Henin in the final; Henin-Hardenne was forced to retire at 1–6, 0–2 down due to a stomach virus. It began Henin-Hardenne's run of reaching the final of all four Grand Slam events, winning the French Open.

== Leadup ==
Several leading men's players declined to attend the Open due to injury, including Andre Agassi, Rafael Nadal and defending champion Marat Safin. The women's tournament had no absentees among the top 20 ranked players.

It was Martina Hingis' first grand slam event in her comeback to the game. Lindsay Davenport and Serena Williams were among those who welcomed her return to the circuit as a positive step forward for women's tennis.

== Finals ==
=== Seniors ===
==== Men's singles ====
(Switzerland) Roger Federer defeated (Cyprus) Marcos Baghdatis, 5–7, 7–5, 6–0, 6–2

- It was Federer's 2nd title of the year, and his 35th overall. It was his 7th career Grand Slam title, and his 2nd Australian Open title.

==== Women's singles ====
(France) Amélie Mauresmo defeated (Belgium) Justine Henin, 6–1, 2–0, retired

- It was Mauresmo's 1st title of the year, and her 20th overall. It was her 1st career Grand Slam title.

==== Men's doubles ====
(United States) Bob Bryan / (United States) Mike Bryan defeated (Czech Republic) Martin Damm / (India) Leander Paes, 4–6, 6–3, 6–4

==== Women's doubles ====
(China) Yan Zi / (China) Zheng Jie defeated (Australia) Samantha Stosur / (United States) Lisa Raymond, 2–6, 7–6(7), 6–3

==== Mixed doubles ====
(Switzerland) Martina Hingis / (India) Mahesh Bhupathi defeated (Russia) Elena Likhovtseva / (Canada) Daniel Nestor, 6–3, 6–3

=== Juniors ===
==== Boys' singles ====
(France) Alexandre Sidorenko defeated (Australia) Nick Lindahl, 6–3, 7–6(4)

==== Girls' singles ====
(Russia) Anastasia Pavlyuchenkova defeated (Denmark) Caroline Wozniacki, (Note: Wozniacki made the final of the Women's singles in 2018, defeating Simona Halep in the final in three sets.) 1–6, 6–2, 6–3

==== Boys' doubles ====
(Poland) Błażej Koniusz / (Poland) Grzegorz Panfil defeated (United States) Kellen Damico / (United States) Nathaniel Schnugg, 7–6(5), 6–3

==== Girls' doubles ====
(Canada) Sharon Fichman / (Russia) Anastasia Pavlyuchenkova defeated (France) Alizé Cornet / (Italy) Corinna Dentoni, 6–2, 6–2

== Legends ==
=== Men's doubles ===
- (Australia) John Fitzgerald / (Australia) Todd Woodbridge defeated (Australia) Pat Cash / (Australia) Peter McNamara, 6–3, 6–3,

=== Mixed doubles ===
- (Australia) Phil Dent / (Australia) Dianne Balestrat defeated (Australia) Tony Roche / (Australia) Liz Smylie, 6–1, 6–1

== Wheelchair ==
=== Men's singles ===
(France) Michaël Jérémiasz defeated (Japan) Satoshi Saida, 5–7, 6–4, 6–3

=== Women's singles ===
(Netherlands) Esther Vergeer defeated (Netherlands) Jiske Griffioen, 6–4, 6–0

=== Men's doubles ===
(Netherlands) Robin Ammerlaan / (Austria) Martin Legner defeated (France) Michaël Jérémiasz / (Japan) Satoshi Saida, 3–6, 6–3 7–6(5)

=== Women's doubles ===
(Netherlands) Jiske Griffioen / (Netherlands) Esther Vergeer defeated (Canada) Yuka Chokyu / (Japan) Mie Yaosa, 6–2, 6–0

== Seeds ==
=== Men's singles ===
Seed	Player	Result
1	(Switzerland) Roger Federer	Winner
2	(United States) Andy Roddick	lost in R16 (to Marcos Baghdatis)
3	(Australia) Lleyton Hewitt	lost in R64 (to Juan Ignacio Chela)
4	(Argentina) David Nalbandian	lost in SF (to Marcos Baghdatis)
5	(Russia) Nikolay Davydenko	lost in QF (to Roger Federer)
6	(Argentina) Guillermo Coria	lost in R32 (to Sébastien Grosjean)
7	(Croatia) Ivan Ljubičić	lost in QF (to Marcos Baghdatis)
8	(Argentina) Gastón Gaudio	lost in R32 (to Fabrice Santoro)
9	(Chile) Fernando González	lost in R128 (to Alex Bogomolov Jr.)
10	(Sweden) Thomas Johansson	lost in R16 (to Ivan Ljubičić)
11	(Spain) David Ferrer	lost in R16 (to Fabrice Santoro)
12	(Slovakia) Dominik Hrbatý	lost in R16 (to Nikolay Davydenko)
13	(United States) Robby Ginepri	lost in R64 (to Denis Gremelmayr)
14	(France) Richard Gasquet	lost in R128 (to Tommy Haas)
15	(Spain) Juan Carlos Ferrero	lost in R32 (to Nicolas Kiefer)
16	(Spain) Tommy Robredo	lost in R16 (to David Nalbandian)
17	(Czech Republic) Radek Štěpánek	lost in R64 (to Marcos Baghdatis)
18	(Croatia) Mario Ančić	lost in R32 (to David Ferrer)
19	(Czech Republic) Tomáš Berdych	lost in R64 (to Gilles Simon)
20	(United States) James Blake	lost in R32 (to Tommy Robredo)
21	(Germany) Nicolas Kiefer	lost in SF (to Roger Federer)
22	(France) Gaël Monfils	lost in R128 (to Luis Horna)
23	(Russia) Igor Andreev	lost in R32 (to Dominik Hrbatý)
24	(Belgium) Olivier Rochus	lost in R64 (to Peter Luczak)
25	(France) Sébastien Grosjean	lost in QF (to Nicolas Kiefer)
26	(Finland) Jarkko Nieminen	lost in R32 (to David Nalbandian)
27	(United States) Taylor Dent	lost in R128 (to Guillermo García López)
28	(Spain) Fernando Verdasco	lost in R64 (to Kristof Vliegen)
29	(Italy) Filippo Volandri	lost in R128 (to Nathan Healey)
30	(Belarus) Max Mirnyi	lost in R32 (to Roger Federer)
31	(Spain) Feliciano López	lost in R32 (to Ivan Ljubičić)
32	(Spain) Carlos Moyá	lost in R128 (to Andrei Pavel)

=== Women's singles ===
Seed	Player	Result
1	(United States) Lindsay Davenport	lost in QF (to Justine Henin-Hardenne)
2	(Belgium) Kim Clijsters	lost in SF (to Amélie Mauresmo)
3	(France) Amélie Mauresmo	Winner
4	(Russia) Maria Sharapova	lost in SF (to Justine Henin-Hardenne)
5	(France) Mary Pierce	lost in R64 (to Iveta Benešová)
6	(Russia) Nadia Petrova	lost in QF (to Maria Sharapova)
7	(Switzerland) Patty Schnyder	lost in QF (to Amélie Mauresmo)
8	(Belgium) Justine Henin-Hardenne	lost in Final (to Amélie Mauresmo)
9	(Russia) Elena Dementieva	lost in R128 (to Julia Schruff)
10	(United States) Venus Williams	lost in R128 (to Tsvetana Pironkova)
11	(France) Nathalie Dechy	lost in R128 (to Yan Zi)
12	(Russia) Anastasia Myskina	lost in R16 (to Patty Schnyder)
13	(United States) Serena Williams	lost in R32 (to Daniela Hantuchová)
14	(Russia) Svetlana Kuznetsova	lost in R16 (to Lindsay Davenport)
15	(Italy) Francesca Schiavone	lost in R16 (to Kim Clijsters)
16	(Czech Republic) Nicole Vaidišová	lost in R16 (to Amélie Mauresmo)
17	(Slovakia) Daniela Hantuchová	lost in R16 (to Maria Sharapova)
18	(Russia) Elena Likhovtseva	lost in R64 (to Virginia Ruano Pascual)
19	(Russia) Dinara Safina	lost in R64 (to Sofia Arvidsson)
20	(Italy) Flavia Pennetta	lost in R32 (to Nicole Vaidišová)
21	(Serbia and Montenegro) Ana Ivanovic	lost in R64 (to Samantha Stosur)
22	(Germany) Anna-Lena Grönefeld	lost in R64 (to María Sánchez Lorenzo)
23	(Serbia and Montenegro) Jelena Janković	lost in R64 (to Olga Savchuk)
24	(France) Tatiana Golovin	lost in R128 (to Mara Santangelo)
25	(Russia) Maria Kirilenko	lost in R32 (to Lindsay Davenport)
26	(Japan) Ai Sugiyama	lost in R128 (to Conchita Martínez Granados)
27	(France) Marion Bartoli	lost in R64 (to Roberta Vinci)
28	(Spain) Anabel Medina Garrigues	lost in R128 (to Zuzana Ondrášková)
29	(Czech Republic) Klára Koukalová	lost in R128 (to Ekaterina Bychkova)
30	(Russia) Vera Zvonareva	lost in R128 (to Martina Hingis)
31	(Argentina) Gisela Dulko	lost in R64 (to Aiko Nakamura)
32	(India) Sania Mirza	lost in R64 (to Michaëlla Krajicek)

=== Attendance ===
Day	Day Session	Night Session	Total
1	36,890	12,855	49,745
2	42,533	15,300	57,833
3	40,291	16,391	56,682
4	37,668	17,728	55,396
5	32,664	15,454	48,118
6	41,247	15,439	56,686
7	22,679	14,958	37,637
8	25,350	15,033	40,383
9	19,385	15,115	34,500
10	17,570	14,542	32,112
11	15,954	14,943	30,897
12	16,303	–	16,303
13	15,452	–	15,452
14	18,806	–	18,806
Total	382,792	167,758	550,550

== Withdrawals ==
Men's Singles

- (United States) Andre Agassi → replaced by (Spain) Fernando Vicente
- (Slovakia) Karol Beck → replaced by (Brazil) Ricardo Mello
- (Argentina) Guillermo Cañas → replaced by (Italy) Potito Starace
- (Sweden) Joachim Johansson → replaced by (Costa Rica) Juan Antonio Marín
- (Ecuador) Nicolás Lapentti → replaced by (United States) Justin Gimelstob
- (Spain) Alberto Martín → replaced by (Italy) Federico Luzzi
- (Spain) Rafael Nadal → replaced by (Spain) Nicolás Almagro
- (Czech Republic) Jiří Novák → replaced by (Netherlands) Raemon Sluiter
- (Argentina) Mariano Puerta → replaced by (Monaco) Jean-René Lisnard
- (United Kingdom) Greg Rusedski → replaced by (Spain) Óscar Hernández
- (Russia) Marat Safin → replaced by (Germany) Alexander Waske
- (Sweden) Robin Söderling → replaced by (South Korea) Lee Hyung-taik
- (Netherlands) Martin Verkerk → replaced by (Romania) Răzvan Sabău

Women's Singles

- (Russia) Elena Bovina → replaced by (United States) Shenay Perry
- (France) Stéphanie Cohen-Aloro → replaced by (Russia) Galina Voskoboeva
- (Bulgaria) Sesil Karatantcheva → replaced by (Ukraine) Yuliana Fedak
- (Bulgaria) Magdalena Maleeva → replaced by (Germany) Martina Müller
- (Spain) Conchita Martínez → replaced by (Japan) Saori Obata
- (Czech Republic) Květa Peschke → replaced by (France) Camille Pin
- (Colombia) Fabiola Zuluaga → replaced by (Spain) Conchita Martínez Granados

== Notes ==
Preceded by 2005 US Open	Grand Slams	Succeeded by 2006 French Open
