= 2006 Australian Open – Mixed doubles =

Mixed doubles
- 2006 Australian Open

Final
- Champion: (Switzerland) Martina Hingis (India) Mahesh Bhupathi
- Runner-up: (Russia) Elena Likhovtseva (Canada) Daniel Nestor
- Score: 6–3, 6–3

Details
- Draw: 32
- Seeds: 8

Events
Singles	men	women		boys	girls
Doubles	men	women	mixed	boys	girls
WC Singles	men	women	quad
WC Doubles	men	women	quad
Legends	men	women	mixed
- Australian Open

Martina Hingis and Mahesh Bhupathi defeated Elena Likhovtseva and Daniel Nestor in the final, 6–3, 6–3 to win the mixed doubles tennis title at the 2006 Australian Open. With the win, Bhupathi completed the career Grand Slam in mixed doubles, becoming the 14th player to do so. It was Hingis' first major mixed doubles title; she would later also complete the career Grand Slam in the discipline.

Samantha Stosur and Scott Draper were the reigning champions, but Draper retired from the sport in 2005. Stosur partnered Paul Hanley, but lost in the semifinals to Hingis and Bhupathi.

== Seeds ==
1. (Zimbabwe) Cara Black / (Zimbabwe) Kevin Ullyett (first round)
2. (United States) Lisa Raymond / (Sweden) Jonas Björkman (second round)
3. (Russia) Vera Zvonareva / (United States) Bob Bryan (quarterfinals)
4. (United States) Corina Morariu / (United States) Mike Bryan (quarterfinals)
5. (Australia) Samantha Stosur / (Australia) Paul Hanley (semifinals)
6. (Russia) Elena Likhovtseva / (Canada) Daniel Nestor (final)
7. (South Africa) Liezel Huber / (Israel) Andy Ram (second round)
8. (Australia) Rennae Stubbs / (Australia) Todd Perry (quarterfinals)

== Draw ==
Key

- Q = Qualifier
- WC = Wild card
- LL = Lucky loser
- Alt = Alternate
- ITF = ITF entry
- PR = Protected ranking
- SR = Special ranking
- SE = Special exempt
- JE = Junior exempt
- JR = Junior Accelerator Programme entrant
- CO = College Accelerator Programme entrant
- NG = Next Gen Accelerator Program entrant
- w/o = Walkover
- r = Retired
- d = Defaulted

=== Finals ===
Semifinals
(France) Nathalie Dechy (India) Leander Paes	6	4	[4]
6	(Russia) Elena Likhovtseva (Canada) Daniel Nestor	3	6	[10]
5	(Australia) Samantha Stosur (Australia) Paul Hanley	3	3
WC	(Switzerland) Martina Hingis (India) Mahesh Bhupathi	6	6

Final
6	(Russia) Elena Likhovtseva (Canada) Daniel Nestor	3	3
WC	(Switzerland) Martina Hingis (India) Mahesh Bhupathi	6	6

=== Top half ===
First round
1	(Zimbabwe) C Black (Zimbabwe) K Ullyett	3	4
(France) N Dechy (India) L Paes	6	6
(Spain) V Ruano Pascual (Argentina) S Prieto	1	r
(United States) M Shaughnessy (Sweden) S Aspelin	1
(Germany) A-L Grönefeld (Czech Republic) F Čermák	6	6
WC	(Australia) L McShea (Australia) M Kimmich	4	1
(Slovenia) K Srebotnik (Serbia and Montenegro) N Zimonjić	5	6^{9}
7	(South Africa) L Huber (Israel) A Ram	7	7^{11}
3	(Russia) V Zvonareva (United States) B Bryan	6	6
(India) S Mirza (Australia) S Huss	3	3
(Czech Republic) L Šafářová (Czech Republic) L Friedl	6	3	[10]
WC	(Australia) C Dellacqua (Australia) P Luczak	1	6	[7]
(Russia) M Kirilenko (Russia) I Andreev	7^{7}	2	[4]
WC	(Serbia and Montenegro) A Ivanovic (Serbia and Montenegro) N Djokovic	6^{4}	6	[10]
(Serbia and Montenegro) J Janković (Austria) J Knowle	6	4	[11]
6	(Russia) E Likhovtseva (Canada) D Nestor	3	6	[13]

Second round
(France) N Dechy (India) L Paes	6	7^{7}
(United States) M Shaughnessy (Sweden) S Aspelin	3	6^{4}
(Germany) A-L Grönefeld (Czech Republic) F Čermák	6	6
7	(South Africa) L Huber (Israel) A Ram	2	3
3	(Russia) V Zvonareva (United States) B Bryan	6	6
(Czech Republic) L Šafářová (Czech Republic) L Friedl	2	1
WC	(Serbia and Montenegro) A Ivanovic (Serbia and Montenegro) N Djokovic	6	1	[5]
6	(Russia) E Likhovtseva (Canada) D Nestor	3	6	[10]

Quarterfinals
(France) N Dechy (India) L Paes	6	7^{7}
(Germany) A-L Grönefeld (Czech Republic) F Čermák	1	6^{4}
3	(Russia) V Zvonareva (United States) B Bryan	4	4
6	(Russia) E Likhovtseva (Canada) D Nestor	6	6

Semifinals
(France) N Dechy (India) L Paes	6	4	[4]
6	(Russia) E Likhovtseva (Canada) D Nestor	3	6	[10]

=== Bottom half ===
First round
5	(Australia) S Stosur (Australia) P Hanley	6	6
Alt	(Australia) N Pratt (Czech Republic) C Suk	3	4
(Australia) B Stewart (United States) J Thomas	7	6^{4}	[10]
WC	(Australia) T Musgrave (Australia) N Healey	5	7^{7}	[8]
(Argentina) P Suárez (The Bahamas) M Knowles	6^{3}	6	[9]
WC	(France) A Cornet (France) G Monfils	7^{7}	2	[11]
(Russia) A Chakvetadze (Czech Republic) M Damm	3	5
4	(United States) C Morariu (United States) M Bryan	6	7
8	(Australia) R Stubbs (Australia) T Perry	7	6
(Israel) S Pe'er (Israel) J Erlich	5	3
(Italy) F Pennetta (Spain) C Moyá	4	4
(Japan) A Sugiyama (Australia) W Arthurs	6	6
WC	(Switzerland) M Hingis (India) M Bhupathi	6	6
WC	(China) N Li (Chinese Taipei) J Wang	2	2
(Russia) A Myskina (Austria) J Melzer	2	2
2	(United States) L Raymond (Sweden) J Björkman	6	6

Second round
5	(Australia) S Stosur (Australia) P Hanley	6	6
(Australia) B Stewart (United States) J Thomas	4	3
WC	(France) A Cornet (France) G Monfils	2	3
4	(United States) C Morariu (United States) M Bryan	6	6
8	(Australia) R Stubbs (Australia) T Perry	6	7
(Japan) A Sugiyama (Australia) W Arthurs	4	5
WC	(Switzerland) M Hingis (India) M Bhupathi	7	6^{7}	[10]
2	(United States) L Raymond (Sweden) J Björkman	5	7^{9}	[7]

Quarterfinals
5	(Australia) S Stosur (Australia) P Hanley	7^{7}	4	[10]
4	(United States) C Morariu (United States) M Bryan	6^{4}	6	[8]
8	(Australia) R Stubbs (Australia) T Perry	5	6^{5}
WC	(Switzerland) M Hingis (India) M Bhupathi	7	7^{7}

Semifinals
5	(Australia) S Stosur (Australia) P Hanley	3	3
WC	(Switzerland) M Hingis (India) M Bhupathi	6	6
