= 2005 Idea Prokom Open =

- Date: 1–7 August
- Edition: 8th
- Category: International Series
- Draw: 32S / 16D
- Prize money: $475,000
- Surface: Clay / outdoor
- Location: Sopot, Poland

Champions

Singles
- (France) Gaël Monfils

Doubles
- (Poland) Mariusz Fyrstenberg / (Poland) Marcin Matkowski
- Idea Prokom Open

The 2005 Idea Prokom Open was the eighth edition of this men's tennis tournament and was played on outdoor clay courts. The tournament was part of the International Series of the 2005 ATP Tour. It took place in Sopot, Poland from 1 August through 7 August 2005. Unseeded Gaël Monfils won the singles title.

== Finals ==
=== Singles ===
(France) Gaël Monfils defeated (Germany) Florian Mayer, 7–6^{(8–6)}, 4–6, 7–5

- It was the first singles title of Monfils' career.

=== Doubles ===
(Poland) Mariusz Fyrstenberg / (Poland) Marcin Matkowski defeated (Argentina) Lucas Arnold Ker / (Argentina) Sebastián Prieto, 7–6^{(9–7)}, 6–4

- It was the first title of the year and the third of their career for both Fyrstenberg and Matkowski.
