= 2018 Qatar ExxonMobil Open =

- Date: 1–6 January
- Edition: 26th
- Category: ATP World Tour 250 series
- Draw: 32S/16D
- Surface: Hard / outdoor
- Location: Doha, Qatar

Champions

Singles
- (France) Gaël Monfils

Doubles
- (Austria) Oliver Marach / (Croatia) Mate Pavić
← 2017 ·	ATP Qatar Open	· 2019 →

The 2018 Qatar Open (also known as 2018 Qatar ExxonMobil Open for sponsorship reasons) was a men's tennis tournament played on outdoor hard courts. It was the 26th edition of the Qatar Open, and part of the ATP World Tour 250 series of the 2018 ATP World Tour. It took place at the Khalifa International Tennis and Squash Complex in Doha, Qatar, from 1 January until 6 January 2018. Unseeded Gaël Monfils, who entered the main draw on a wildcard, won the singles title.

== Finals ==
=== Singles ===
(France) Gaël Monfils defeated (Russia) Andrey Rublev, 6–2, 6–3

- It was Monfils' 1st singles title of the year and the 7th of his career.

=== Doubles ===
(Austria) Oliver Marach / (Croatia) Mate Pavić defeated (United Kingdom) Jamie Murray / (Brazil) Bruno Soares, 6–2, 7–6^{(8–6)}

== Points and prize money ==
=== Point distribution ===
Event	W	F	SF	QF	Round of 16	Round of 32	Q	Q2	Q1
Singles	250	150	90	45	20	0	12	6	0
Doubles	250	150	90	45	0	—	—	—	—

=== Prize money ===
Event	W	F	SF	QF	Round of 16	Round of 32	Q2	Q1
Singles	$218,180	$114,900	$62,240	$35,460	$20,895	$12,380	$5,570	$2,785
Doubles	$69,870	$36,730	$19,900	$11,390	$6,670	—	—	—
Doubles prize money per team

== Singles main-draw entrants ==
=== Seeds ===
Country	Player	Rank^{1}	Seed
AUT	Dominic Thiem	5	1
ESP	Pablo Carreño Busta	10	2
CZE	Tomáš Berdych	19	3
ESP	Albert Ramos Viñolas	23	4
FRA	Richard Gasquet	31	5
SRB	Filip Krajinović	34	6
ESP	Fernando Verdasco	35	7
ESP	Feliciano López	36	8

- ^{1} Rankings are as of December 25, 2017.

=== Other entrants ===
The following players received wildcards into the singles main draw:

- (Qatar) Jabor Al-Mutawa
- (Tunisia) Malek Jaziri
- (France) Gaël Monfils

The following players received entry using a protected ranking:

- (Austria) Andreas Haider-Maurer

The following players received entry from the qualifying draw:

- (Bosnia and Herzegovina) Mirza Bašić
- (Italy) Matteo Berrettini
- (Italy) Stefano Travaglia
- (Greece) Stefanos Tsitsipas

The following player received entry as alternate:

- (Dominican Republic) Víctor Estrella Burgos

=== Withdrawals ===
Before the tournament

- (Serbia) Novak Djokovic →replaced by (Dominican Republic) Víctor Estrella Burgos
- (France) Jo-Wilfried Tsonga →replaced by (Germany) Cedrik-Marcel Stebe

During the tournament

- (Austria) Dominic Thiem

=== Retirements ===
- (Germany) Cedrik-Marcel Stebe

== Doubles main-draw entrants ==
=== Seeds ===
Country	Player	Country	Player	Rank^{1}	Seed
GBR	Jamie Murray	BRA	Bruno Soares	19	1
AUT	Oliver Marach	CRO	Mate Pavić	36	2
ESP	Feliciano López	USA	Rajeev Ram	46	3
CRO	Ivan Dodig	ESP	Fernando Verdasco	71	4

- ^{1} Rankings are as of December 25, 2017.

=== Other entrants ===
The following pairs received wildcards into the doubles main draw:

- (Turkey) Tuna Altuna / (Sweden) Elias Ymer
- (Tunisia) Malek Jaziri / (Qatar) Mousa Shanan Zayed
