= 2005 Grand Prix de Tennis de Lyon – Doubles =

Doubles
- 2005 Grand Prix de Tennis de Lyon

Final
- Champions: (France) Michaël Llodra (France) Fabrice Santoro
- Runners-up: (South Africa) Jeff Coetzee (Netherlands) Rogier Wassen
- Score: 6–3, 6–1

Details
- Draw: 16
- Seeds: 4

Events
Singles	Doubles
← 2004 ·	Grand Prix de Tennis de Lyon	· 2006 →

Jonathan Erlich and Andy Ram were the defending champions, but lost in the semifinals.

Michaël Llodra and Fabrice Santoro won in the final 6–3, 6–1, against Jeff Coetzee and Rogier Wassen.

== Seeds ==
1. (France) Michaël Llodra / (France) Fabrice Santoro (champions)
2. (Israel) Jonathan Erlich / (Israel) Andy Ram (semifinals)
3. (Czech Republic) Cyril Suk / (Czech Republic) Pavel Vízner (first round)
4. (Australia) Jordan Kerr / (United States) Travis Parrott (semifinals)

== Draw ==
=== Key ===
- Q = Qualifier
- WC = Wild card
- LL = Lucky loser
- Alt = Alternate
- SE = Special exempt
- PR = Protected ranking
- ITF = ITF entry
- JE = Junior exempt
- w/o = Walkover
- r = Retired
- d = Defaulted
- SR = Special ranking

=== Draw ===
First round
1	(France) M Llodra (France) F Santoro	6^{4}	7^{7}	7
(France) J Benneteau (France) N Mahut	7^{7}	6^{4}	5
(Argentina) G Gaudio (Argentina) M Puerta	4	4
(Czech Republic) T Cibulec (Czech Republic) D Škoch	6	6
4	(Australia) J Kerr (United States) T Parrott	6	6
WC	(France) A Clément (France) S Grosjean	4	3
(South Africa) C Haggard (Sweden) R Lindstedt	3	7	6
(Belgium) O Rochus (Belgium) T Vanhoudt	6	5	2
(France) P-H Mathieu (France) G Monfils	4	7^{7}	2
(Spain) T Robredo (Italy) D Sanguinetti	6	6^{5}	6
(South Africa) J Coetzee (Netherlands) R Wassen	6	4	7^{7}
3	(Czech Republic) C Suk (Czech Republic) P Vízner	4	6	6^{4}
(United States) T Dent (United States) R Ginepri
(United States) J Blake (Czech Republic) J Hernych	w/o
WC	(France) T Ascione (France) G Simon	3	4
2	(Israel) J Erlich (Israel) A Ram	6	6

Quarterfinals
1	(France) M Llodra (France) F Santoro	6	6
(Czech Republic) T Cibulec (Czech Republic) D Škoch	2	3
4	(Australia) J Kerr (United States) T Parrott	7^{7}	7^{10}
(South Africa) C Haggard (Sweden) R Lindstedt	6^{0}	6^{8}
(Spain) T Robredo (Italy) D Sanguinetti	3	3
(South Africa) J Coetzee (Netherlands) R Wassen	6	6
(United States) J Blake (Czech Republic) J Hernych	5	6	3
2	(Israel) J Erlich (Israel) A Ram	7	4	6

Semifinals
1	(France) M Llodra (France) F Santoro	6	6
4	(Australia) J Kerr (United States) T Parrott	3	4
(South Africa) J Coetzee (Netherlands) R Wassen	6	4	6
2	(Israel) J Erlich (Israel) A Ram	4	6	2

Final
1	(France) M Llodra (France) F Santoro	6	6
(South Africa) J Coetzee (Netherlands) R Wassen	3	1
