= Gaël Monfils career statistics =

Career finals
| Discipline | Type | Won | Lost | Total | WR |
|---|---|---|---|---|---|
| Singles | Grand Slam | – | – | – | – |
| Singles | ATP Finals | – | – | – | – |
| Singles | ATP 1000 | – | 3 | 3 | 0.00 |
| Singles | ATP 500 | 3 | 5 | 8 | 0.38 |
| Singles | ATP 250 | 10 | 14 | 24 | 0.42 |
| Singles | Olympics | – | – | – | – |
| Singles | Total | 13 | 22 | 35 | 0.37 |
| Doubles | Grand Slam | – | – | – | – |
| Doubles | ATP Finals | – | – | – | – |
| Doubles | ATP 1000 | – | – | – | – |
| Doubles | ATP 500 | – | – | – | – |
| Doubles | ATP 250 | – | – | – | – |
| Doubles | Olympics | – | – | – | – |
| Doubles | Total | – | – | – | – |

This is a list of the main career statistics of French professional former tennis player Gaël Monfils. All statistics are according to the ATP Tour and ITF website.

== Performance timelines ==
Key
| W | F | SF | QF | #R | RR | Q# | P# | DNQ | A | Z# | PO | G | S | B | NMS | NTI | P | NH |

(W) winner; (F) finalist; (SF) semifinalist; (QF) quarterfinalist; (#R) rounds 4, 3, 2, 1; (RR) round-robin stage; (Q#) qualification round; (P#) preliminary round; (DNQ) did not qualify; (A) absent; (Z#) Davis/Fed Cup Zonal Group (with number indication) or (PO) play-off; (G) gold, (S) silver or (B) bronze Olympic/Paralympic medal; (NMS) not a Masters tournament; (NTI) not a Tier I tournament; (P) postponed; (NH) not held; (SR) strike rate (events won / competed); (W–L) win–loss record.
To avoid confusion and double counting, these charts are updated at the conclusion of a tournament or when the player's participation has ended.

=== Singles ===
| Tournament | 2003 | 2004 | 2005 | 2006 | 2007 | 2008 | 2009 | 2010 | 2011 | 2012 | 2013 | 2014 | 2015 | 2016 | 2017 | 2018 | 2019 | 2020 | 2021 | 2022 | 2023 | 2024 | 2025 | 2026 | SR | W–L | Win% |
|---|---|---|---|---|---|---|---|---|---|---|---|---|---|---|---|---|---|---|---|---|---|---|---|---|---|---|---|
Grand Slam tournaments
| Australian Open | A | A | 2R | 1R | 3R | A | 4R | 3R | 3R | 3R | 3R | 3R | 2R | QF | 4R | 2R | 2R | 4R | 1R | QF | A | 2R | 4R | 1R | 0 / 20 | 37–20 | 65% |
| French Open | A | Q1 | 1R | 4R | 3R | SF | QF | 2R | QF | A | 3R | QF | 4R | A | 4R | 3R | 4R | 1R | 2R | A | 2R | 2R | 2R | 1R | 0 / 19 | 40–18 | 69% |
| Wimbledon | A | A | 3R | 1R | 3R | A | A | 3R | 3R | A | A | 2R | 3R | 1R | 3R | 4R | 1R | NH | 2R | A | A | 3R | 2R | A | 0 / 14 | 20–14 | 59% |
| US Open | A | A | 1R | 2R | A | 4R | 4R | QF | 2R | A | 2R | QF | 1R | SF | 3R | 2R | QF | A | 3R | A | 2R | 2R | 1R | 2R | 0 / 18 | 34–18 | 65% |
| Win–loss | 0–0 | 0–0 | 3–4 | 4–4 | 6–3 | 8–2 | 10–3 | 9–4 | 9–4 | 2–1 | 5–3 | 11–4 | 6–4 | 9–3 | 10–4 | 7–4 | 8–4 | 3–2 | 4–4 | 4–1 | 2–1 | 5–4 | 5–4 | 1–3 | 0 / 71 | 131–70 | 65% |
Year-end championships
| ATP Finals | did not qualify | | | | | | | | | | | | | RR | did not qualify | | Alt | did not qualify | | | | | | | 0 / 1 | 0–2 | 0% |
National representation
| Summer Olympics | NH | A | NH | | | QF | NH | | | A | NH | | | QF | NH | | | | 1R | NH | | 1R | NH | | 0 / 4 | 6–4 | 60% |
| Davis Cup | A | A | A | A | A | A | 1R | F | SF | QF | A | F | QF | SF | A | A | RR | NH | A | A | A | A | A | A | 0 / 8 | 12–3 | 80% |
ATP 1000 tournaments
| Indian Wells Open | A | A | 2R | 3R | 1R | 1R | 2R | 2R | A | A | A | 3R | A | QF | 4R | 3R | QF | NH | 4R | 4R | 1R | 4R | 3R | 2R | 0 / 17 | 23–16 | 59% |
| Miami Open | A | A | 4R | 2R | 1R | 2R | 4R | A | A | 3R | A | 2R | 4R | QF | A | A | A | NH | A | 3R | 1R | 3R | 4R | A | 0 / 13 | 18–13 | 58% |
| Monte-Carlo Masters | A | A | 1R | 1R | 1R | 3R | 1R | A | 3R | A | 1R | 2R | SF | F | A | A | A | NH | A | A | A | 2R | 2R | 2R | 0 / 13 | 16–13 | 55% |
| Madrid Open | A | A | 1R | 1R | A | QF | A | QF | 2R | 3R | A | A | 2R | 2R | 1R | 2R | 3R | NH | A | 2R | A | 1R | 2R | 1R | 0 / 15 | 16–14 | 53% |
| Italian Open | A | A | A | SF | 1R | A | A | A | A | 2R | A | A | A | 1R | A | 1R | 1R | 1R | 1R | A | A | 1R | A | A | 0 / 9 | 5–9 | 36% |
| Canadian Open | A | A | A | A | A | 1R | 2R | 3R | QF | A | A | 2R | 2R | SF | 3R | A | SF | NH | QF | 3R | QF | 1R | 1R | 2R | 0 / 15 | 25–14 | 64% |
| Cincinnati Open | A | A | 3R | 2R | A | 2R | 1R | 1R | QF | A | A | 3R | 1R | 3R | A | A | 1R | A | 3R | A | 3R | 3R | A | 1R | 0 / 14 | 16–13 | 55% |
| Shanghai Masters | NH | | | | | | 3R | 2R | A | A | QF | A | A | 3R | A | 1R | 2R | NH | | | A | 4R | A | A | 0 / 7 | 11–7 | 61% |
| Paris Masters | A | 2R | A | 1R | A | 3R | F | F | 2R | A | A | 3R | 1R | A | A | A | QF | A | 3R | A | 1R | A | A | A | 0 / 11 | 16–10 | 62% |
| Hamburg Masters | A | A | A | 1R | A | A | ATP Tour 500 | | | | | | | | | | | | | | | | | | 0 / 1 | 0–1 | 0% |
| Win–loss | 0–0 | 1–1 | 6–5 | 6–8 | 0–4 | 8–7 | 9–7 | 10–6 | 6–5 | 4–3 | 3–2 | 7–6 | 8–6 | 19–7 | 4–3 | 3–4 | 12–5 | 0–1 | 8–4 | 6–4 | 5–5 | 11–8 | 7–4 | 3–5 | 0 / 115 | 146–110 | 57% |
Career statistics
| | 2003 | 2004 | 2005 | 2006 | 2007 | 2008 | 2009 | 2010 | 2011 | 2012 | 2013 | 2014 | 2015 | 2016 | 2017 | 2018 | 2019 | 2020 | 2021 | 2022 | 2023 | 2024 | 2025 | 2026 | Career | | |
| Tournaments | 0 | 2 | 23 | 19 | 21 | 17 | 20 | 20 | 18 | 10 | 22 | 16 | 18 | 18 | 14 | 21 | 21 | 8 | 17 | 8 | 13 | 22 | 17 | 10 | 375 | | |
| Titles | 0 | 0 | 1 | 0 | 0 | 0 | 1 | 1 | 1 | 0 | 0 | 1 | 0 | 1 | 0 | 1 | 1 | 2 | 0 | 1 | 1 | 0 | 1 | 0 | 13 | | |
| Finals | 0 | 0 | 3 | 1 | 1 | 1 | 3 | 4 | 2 | 2 | 2 | 2 | 1 | 3 | 1 | 2 | 1 | 2 | 1 | 1 | 1 | 0 | 1 | 0 | 35 | | |
| Hard win–loss | 0–0 | 2–1 | 12–10 | 8–10 | 6–10 | 18–11 | 33–15 | 36–14 | 22–8 | 16–7 | 16–12 | 24–10 | 16–10 | 37–13 | 12–7 | 14–8 | 30–12 | 16–4 | 15–10 | 13–6 | 14–10 | 17–13 | 14–9 | 4–7 | 12 / 229 | 395–217 | 65% |
| Clay win–loss | 0–0 | 0–0 | 6–7 | 9–6 | 12–8 | 9–5 | 8–4 | 8–4 | 11–6 | 3–3 | 15–9 | 10–3 | 12–5 | 7–3 | 3–4 | 10–10 | 6–4 | 0–3 | 2–4 | 1–1 | 1–2 | 3–6 | 3–3 | 1–3 | 1 / 105 | 140–103 | 58% |
| Grass win–loss | 0–0 | 0–0 | 2–3 | 3–2 | 3–3 | 3–1 | 1–0 | 2–2 | 5–2 | 0–0 | 2–1 | 2–2 | 6–3 | 0–1 | 5–3 | 5–2 | 1–3 | 0–0 | 1–3 | 0–0 | 0–0 | 5–2 | 1–3 | 0–0 | 0 / 37 | 47–36 | 57% |
| Carpet win–loss | 0–0 | 1–1 | 5–2 | 0–1 | 0–0 | 0–0 | discontinued | | | | | | | | | | | | | | | | | | 0 / 4 | 6–4 | 60% |
| Overall win–loss | 0–0 | 3–2 | 25–22 | 20–19 | 21–21 | 30–17 | 42–19 | 46–20 | 38–16 | 19–10 | 33–22 | 36–15 | 34–18 | 44–17 | 20–14 | 29–20 | 37–19 | 16–7 | 18–17 | 14–7 | 15–12 | 25–21 | 18–15 | 5–10 | 13 / 375 | 588–360 | 62% |
| Win % | – | 60% | 53% | 51% | 50% | 64% | 69% | 70% | 70% | 66% | 60% | 71% | 65% | 72% | 59% | 59% | 66% | 70% | 51% | 67% | 56% | 54% | 55% | 33% | 62% | | |
| Year-end ranking | 925 | 239 | 30 | 46 | 38 | 14 | 13 | 12 | 15 | 77 | 31 | 18 | 24 | 7 | 46 | 29 | 10 | 11 | 21 | 52 | 74 | 55 | 68 | – | $25,254,080 | | |

=== Doubles ===
| Tournament | 2004 | 2005 | 2006 | 2007 | 2008 | 2009 | 2010 | 2011 | 2012 | 2013 | 2014 | 2015 | 2016 | 2017 | 2018 | 2019 | 2020 | 2021 | 2022 | 2023 | 2024 | 2025 | SR | W–L | Win% |
|---|---|---|---|---|---|---|---|---|---|---|---|---|---|---|---|---|---|---|---|---|---|---|---|---|---|
Grand Slam tournaments
| Australian Open | A | | 1R | absent | | | | | | | 1R | absent | | | | | | | | | | | 0 / 2 | 0–2 | 0% |
| French Open | A | 1R | 1R | 2R | 1R | A | 2R | 1R | A | 1R | 1R | 1R | absent | | | | | | | | | | 0 / 9 | 2–9 | 18% |
| Wimbledon | absent | | | | | | | | | | | | | | | | | | | | | | 0 / 0 | 0–0 | – |
| US Open | A | 1R | A | | | | 1R | 1R | absent | | | | | | | | | | | | | | 0 / 3 | 0–3 | 0% |
| Win–loss | 0–0 | 0–2 | 0–2 | 1–1 | 0–1 | 0–0 | 2–1 | 0–2 | 0–0 | 0–1 | 0–2 | 0–1 | 0–0 | 0–0 | 0–0 | 0–0 | 0–0 | 0–0 | 0–0 | 0–0 | 0–0 | 0–0 | 0 / 14 | 2–14 | 12% |
National representation
| Summer Olympics | not held | | | | 1R | not held | | | | | | | 1R | not held | | | | 2R | not held | | 2R | NH | 0 / 4 | 2–4 | 33% |
ATP 1000 tournaments
| Indian Wells Open | A | 2R | 1R | A | | 1R | 1R | A | 1R | A | 1R | | | | | 1R | absent | | | | | | 0 / 7 | 1–7 | 12% |
| Miami Open | absent | | | | | | | | | | | 1R | absent | | | | | | | | | | 0 / 1 | 0–1 | 0% |
| Monte-Carlo Masters | | 1R | A | | | 2R | A | 2R | A | | | 2R | absent | | | | | | | | | | 0 / 4 | 3–3 | 50% |
| Madrid Open | A | | | | 1R | A | 1R | A | 2R | A | | 1R | absent | | | | | | | | | | 0 / 4 | 1–4 | 20% |
| Italian Open | absent | | | | | | | | | | | | | | | | | | | | | | 0 / 0 | 0–0 | – |
| Canadian Open | absent | | | | | | QF | 1R | A | | | 2R | A | QF | A | | | | 2R | A | | | 0 / 5 | 6–4 | 60% |
| Cincinnati Open | A | | 1R | A | | | 1R | 1R | A | | 1R | 1R | absent | | | | | | | | | | 0 / 5 | 0–5 | 0% |
| Shanghai Masters | not held | | | | | absent | | | | | | | | | 2R | 1R | absent | | | | | | 0 / 2 | 1–2 | 33% |
| Paris Masters | A | | | | 2R | A | | | | 1R | 1R | absent | | | | | | | | | | | 0 / 3 | 1–3 | 25% |
| Win–loss | 0–0 | 1–2 | 1–2 | 0–0 | 0–2 | 1–1 | 2–4 | 1–3 | 1–2 | 0–1 | 0–3 | 2–5 | 0–0 | 2–1 | 1–1 | 0–2 | 0–0 | 0–0 | 1–0 | 0–0 | 0–0 | 0–0 | 0 / 31 | 13–29 | 31% |
Career statistics
| | 2004 | 2005 | 2006 | 2007 | 2008 | 2009 | 2010 | 2011 | 2012 | 2013 | 2014 | 2015 | 2016 | 2017 | 2018 | 2019 | 2020 | 2021 | 2022 | 2023 | 2024 | 2025 | Career | | |
| Titles | 0 | 0 | 0 | 0 | 0 | 0 | 0 | 0 | 0 | 0 | 0 | 0 | 0 | 0 | 0 | 0 | 0 | 0 | 0 | 0 | 0 | 0 | 0 | | |
| Finals | 0 | 0 | 0 | 0 | 0 | 0 | 0 | 0 | 0 | 0 | 0 | 0 | 0 | 0 | 0 | 0 | 0 | 0 | 0 | 0 | 0 | 0 | 0 | | |
| Hard win–loss | 0–0 | 2–6 | 1–5 | 1–1 | 1–4 | 0–1 | 4–7 | 0–3 | 1–4 | 0–2 | 0–4 | 1–4 | 0–1 | 2–1 | 1–1 | 0–2 | 0–0 | 1–1 | 1–0 | 0–1 | 0–0 | 0–1 | 16–49 | | 25% |
| Clay win–loss | 0–0 | 0–2 | 1–2 | 1–1 | 0–1 | 1–0 | 1–2 | 2–4 | 1–1 | 0–3 | 0–2 | 1–4 | 0–0 | 0–0 | 2–4 | 0–0 | 0–0 | 0–0 | 0–0 | 0–0 | 1–1 | 0–0 | 11–27 | | 29% |
| Grass win–loss | 0–0 | 0–1 | 1–0 | 0–1 | 0–1 | 0–1 | 0–1 | 1–1 | 0–0 | 0–0 | 0–0 | 0–1 | 0–0 | 0–1 | 0–0 | 0–0 | 0–0 | 0–0 | 0–0 | 0–0 | 0–0 | 0–0 | 2–8 | | 20% |
| Carpet win–loss | 0–1 | 0–1 | 0–0 | 0–0 | 0–0 | discontinued | | | | | | | | | | | | | | | | | 0–2 | | 0% |
| Overall win–loss | 0–1 | 2–10 | 3–7 | 2–3 | 1–6 | 1–2 | 5–10 | 3–8 | 2–5 | 0–5 | 0–6 | 2–9 | 0–1 | 2–2 | 3–5 | 0–2 | 0–0 | 1–1 | 1–0 | 0–1 | 1–1 | 0–1 | 29–86 | | 25% |
| Win % | 0% | 17% | 30% | 40% | 14% | 33% | 33% | 27% | 29% | 0% | 0% | 18% | 0% | 50% | 37% | 0% | – | 50% | 100% | 0% | 50% | 0% | 25% | | |
| Year-end ranking | 874 | 304 | 391 | 375T | 581 | 526 | 202 | 273 | 561 | – | – | 377 | – | 313 | 273 | – | – | – | 556 | – | – | – | | | |

== ATP 1000 tournaments ==
=== Singles: 3 (3 runner-ups) ===
| Result | Year | Tournament | Surface | Opponent | Score |
|---|---|---|---|---|---|
| Loss | 2009 | Paris Masters | Hard (i) | (Serbia) Novak Djokovic | 2–6, 7–5, 6–7^{(3–7)} |
| Loss | 2010 | Paris Masters | Hard (i) | (Sweden) Robin Söderling | 1–6, 6–7^{(1–7)} |
| Loss | 2016 | Monte-Carlo Masters | Clay | (Spain) Rafael Nadal | 5–7, 7–5, 0–6 |

== ATP Tour finals ==
Monfils reached a final for 19 consecutive seasons, and is one of four players in the Open Era to do so for 19 or more seasons.

=== Singles: 35 (13 titles, 22 runner-ups) ===
| Legend Grand Slam (0–0) ATP Finals (0–0) ATP 1000 (0–3) ATP 500 (3–5) ATP 250 (10–14) | Finals by surface Hard (12–15) Clay (1–5) Grass (0–1) Carpet (0–1) | Finals by setting Outdoor (5–12) Indoor (8–10) |

| Result | W–L | Date | Tournament | Tier | Surface | Opponent | Score |
|---|---|---|---|---|---|---|---|
| Win | 1–0 | Aug 2005 | Sopot Open, Poland | International | Clay | (Germany) Florian Mayer | 7–6^{(8–6)}, 4–6, 7–5 |
| Loss | 1–1 | Oct 2005 | Open de Moselle, France | International | Hard (i) | (Croatia) Ivan Ljubičić | 6–7^{(7–9)}, 0–6 |
| Loss | 1–2 | Oct 2005 | Grand Prix de Tennis de Lyon, France | International | Carpet (i) | (United States) Andy Roddick | 3–6, 2–6 |
| Loss | 1–3 | Jan 2006 | Qatar Open, Qatar | International | Hard | (Switzerland) Roger Federer | 3–6, 6–7^{(5–7)} |
| Loss | 1–4 | May 2007 | Pörtschach Open, Austria | International | Clay | (Argentina) Juan Mónaco | 6–7^{(3–7)}, 0–6 |
| Loss | 1–5 | Oct 2008 | Vienna Open, Austria | Intl. Gold | Hard (i) | (Germany) Philipp Petzschner | 4–6, 4–6 |
| Loss | 1–6 | Feb 2009 | Mexican Open, Mexico | ATP 500 | Clay | (Spain) Nicolás Almagro | 4–6, 4–6 |
| Win | 2–6 | Sep 2009 | Open de Moselle, France | ATP 250 | Hard (i) | (Germany) Philipp Kohlschreiber | 7–6^{(7–1)}, 3–6, 6–2 |
| Loss | 2–7 | Nov 2009 | Paris Masters, France | ATP 1000 | Hard (i) | (Serbia) Novak Djokovic | 2–6, 7–5, 6–7^{(3–7)} |
| Loss | 2–8 | Jul 2010 | Stuttgart Open, Germany | ATP 250 | Clay | (Spain) Albert Montañés | 2–6, 2–1 ret. |
| Loss | 2–9 | Oct 2010 | Japan Open, Japan | ATP 500 | Hard | (Spain) Rafael Nadal | 1–6, 5–7 |
| Win | 3–9 | Oct 2010 | Open Sud de France, France | ATP 250 | Hard (i) | (Croatia) Ivan Ljubičić | 6–2, 5–7, 6–1 |
| Loss | 3–10 | Nov 2010 | Paris Masters, France | ATP 1000 | Hard (i) | (Sweden) Robin Söderling | 1–6, 6–7^{(1–7)} |
| Loss | 3–11 | Aug 2011 | Washington Open, United States | ATP 500 | Hard | (Czech Republic) Radek Štěpánek | 4–6, 4–6 |
| Win | 4–11 | Oct 2011 | Stockholm Open, Sweden | ATP 250 | Hard (i) | (Finland) Jarkko Nieminen | 7–5, 3–6, 6–2 |
| Loss | 4–12 | Jan 2012 | Qatar Open, Qatar | ATP 250 | Hard | (France) Jo-Wilfried Tsonga | 5–7, 3–6 |
| Loss | 4–13 | Feb 2012 | Open Sud de France, France | ATP 250 | Hard (i) | (Czech Republic) Tomáš Berdych | 2–6, 6–4, 3–6 |
| Loss | 4–14 | May 2013 | Open de Nice Côte d'Azur, France | ATP 250 | Clay | (Spain) Albert Montañés | 0–6, 6–7^{(3–7)} |
| Loss | 4–15 | Aug 2013 | Winston-Salem Open, United States | ATP 250 | Hard | (Austria) Jürgen Melzer | 3–6, 1–2 ret. |
| Loss | 4–16 | Jan 2014 | Qatar Open, Qatar | ATP 250 | Hard | (Spain) Rafael Nadal | 1–6, 7–6^{(7–5)}, 2–6 |
| Win | 5–16 | Feb 2014 | Open Sud de France, France (2) | ATP 250 | Hard (i) | (France) Richard Gasquet | 6–4, 6–4 |
| Loss | 5–17 | Feb 2015 | Open 13, France | ATP 250 | Hard (i) | (France) Gilles Simon | 4–6, 6–1, 6–7^{(4–7)} |
| Loss | 5–18 | Feb 2016 | Rotterdam Open, Netherlands | ATP 500 | Hard (i) | (Slovakia) Martin Kližan | 7–6^{(7–1)}, 3–6, 1–6 |
| Loss | 5–19 | Apr 2016 | Monte-Carlo Masters, France | ATP 1000 | Clay | (Spain) Rafael Nadal | 5–7, 7–5, 0–6 |
| Win | 6–19 | Jul 2016 | Washington Open, United States | ATP 500 | Hard | (Croatia) Ivo Karlović | 5–7, 7–6^{(8–6)}, 6–4 |
| Loss | 6–20 | Jul 2017 | Eastbourne International, United Kingdom | ATP 250 | Grass | (Serbia) Novak Djokovic | 3–6, 4–6 |
| Win | 7–20 | Jan 2018 | Qatar Open, Qatar | ATP 250 | Hard | (Russia) Andrey Rublev | 6–2, 6–3 |
| Loss | 7–21 | Oct 2018 | European Open, Belgium | ATP 250 | Hard (i) | (United Kingdom) Kyle Edmund | 6–3, 6–7^{(2–7)}, 6–7^{(4–7)} |
| Win | 8–21 | Feb 2019 | Rotterdam Open, Netherlands | ATP 500 | Hard (i) | (Switzerland) Stan Wawrinka | 6–3, 1–6, 6–2 |
| Win | 9–21 | Feb 2020 | Open Sud de France, France (3) | ATP 250 | Hard (i) | (Canada) Vasek Pospisil | 7–5, 6–3 |
| Win | 10–21 | Feb 2020 | Rotterdam Open, Netherlands (2) | ATP 500 | Hard (i) | (Canada) Félix Auger-Aliassime | 6–2, 6–4 |
| Loss | 10–22 | Oct 2021 | Sofia Open, Bulgaria | ATP 250 | Hard (i) | (Italy) Jannik Sinner | 3–6, 4–6 |
| Win | 11–22 | Jan 2022 | Adelaide International 1, Australia | ATP 250 | Hard | (Russia) Karen Khachanov | 6–4, 6–4 |
| Win | 12–22 | Oct 2023 | Stockholm Open, Sweden (2) | ATP 250 | Hard (i) | Pavel Kotov | 4–6, 7–6^{(8–6)}, 6–3 |
| Win | 13–22 | Jan 2025 | Auckland Open, New Zealand | ATP 250 | Hard | (Belgium) Zizou Bergs | 6–3, 6–4 |

== National representation ==
=== Davis Cup finals (0–2) ===
| Result | W–L | Date | Tournament | Surface | Partner | Opponents | Score |
|---|---|---|---|---|---|---|---|
| Loss | 0–1 | Dec 2010 | Davis Cup, Serbia | Hard (i) | (France) Gilles Simon (France) Arnaud Clément (France) Michaël Llodra | (Serbia) Novak Djokovic (Serbia) Viktor Troicki (Serbia) Janko Tipsarević (Serbia) Nenad Zimonjić | 2–3 |
| Loss | 0–2 | Nov 2014 | Davis Cup, France | Clay (i) | (France) Jo-Wilfried Tsonga (France) Julien Benneteau (France) Richard Gasquet | (Switzerland) Roger Federer (Switzerland) Stan Wawrinka (Switzerland) Marco Chiudinelli (Switzerland) Michael Lammer | 1–3 |

=== Davis Cup matches ===
| Group membership World Group (12–1) WG play-off (0–1) Group I (0–0) Group II (0–0) Group III (0–0) Group IV (0–0) | Matches by Surface Hard (7–1) Clay (5–1) Grass (0–0) Carpet (0–0) | Matches by Type Singles (40–8) Doubles (12–10) | Matches by Setting Indoors (9–2) Outdoors (3–0) | Matches by Venue France (8–0) Away (4–2) |

- ▲ ▼ indicates the result of the Davis Cup match followed by the score, date, place of event, the zonal classification and its phase, and the court surface.

| Result | No. | Rubber | Match type (partner if any) | Opponent nation | Opponent player(s) | Score |
▲4–1; 18–20 September 2009; MECC Maastricht, Maastricht, Netherlands; World Group play-off; clay (i) surface
| Loss | 1 | I | Singles | Netherlands | Thiemo de Bakker | 3–6, 7–5, 3–6, 4–6 |
▲4–1; 05–07 March 2010; Palais de Sports, Toulon, France; World Group first round; hard (i) surface
| Win | 2 | I | Singles | Germany | Philipp Kohlschreiber | 6–1, 6–4, 7–6^{(7–5)} |
▲5–0; 9–11 July 2010; Zenith – Grande Halle d'Auvergne, Clermont-Ferrand, France; World Group quarterfinal; hard (i) surface
| Win | 3 | I | Singles | Spain | David Ferrer | 7–6^{(7–3)}, 6–2, 4–6, 5–7, 6–4 |
▲5–0; 17–19 September 2010; Palais des Sports de Gerland, Lyon, France; World Group semifinal; hard (i) surface
| Win | 4 | II | Singles | Argentina | David Nalbandian | 6–4, 2–6, 6–4, 6–3 |
▼2–3; 03–05 December 2010; Belgrade Arena, Belgrade, Serbia; World Group final; hard (i) surface
| Win | 5 | I | Singles | Serbia | Janko Tipsarević | 6–1, 7–6^{(7–4)}, 6–0 |
| Loss | 6 | IV | Singles | Serbia | Novak Djokovic | 2–6, 2–6, 4–6 |
▲4–1; 8–10 July 2011; TC Weissenhof Stuttgart, Stuttgart, Germany; World Group quarterfinal; clay surface
| Win | 7 | II | Singles | Germany | Philipp Kohlschreiber | 7–6^{(7–3)}, 7–6^{(7–5)}, 6–4 |
▲4–1; 10–12 February 2012; Thunderbird Sports Centre, Vancouver, Canada; World Group first round; hard (i) surface
| Win | 8 | V | Singles (dead rubber) | Canada | Vasek Pospisil | 6–4, 6–4 |
▲5–0; 31 January–02 February 2014; Vendéspace, La Roche-sur-Yon, France; World Group first round; clay (i) surface
| Win | 9 | V | Singles (dead rubber) | Australia | Nick Kyrgios | 7–6^{(7–5)}, 6–4 |
▲3–2; 4–6 April 2014; Palais Des Sports Jean Weille, Nancy, France; World Group quarterfinals; hard (i) surface
| Win | 10 | V | Singles (decider) | Germany | Peter Gojowczyk | 6–1, 7–6^{(7–0)}, 6–2 |
▲4–1; 12–14 September 2014; Stade Roland Garros, Paris, France; World Group semifinal; clay surface
| Win | 11 | V | Singles (dead rubber) | Czech Republic | Lukáš Rosol | 5–7, 6–4, 7–5 |
▼1–3; 21–23 November 2014; Stade Pierre-Mauroy, Lille, France; World Group final; clay (i) surface
| Win | 12 | II | Singles | Switzerland | Roger Federer | 6–1, 6–4, 6–3 |
▲3–2; 6–8 March 2015; Fraport Arena, Frankfurt, Germany; World Group first round; hard (i) surface
| Win | 13 | II | Singles | Germany | Philipp Kohlschreiber | 6–4, 7–5, 7–6^{(7–4)} |
▲5–0; 4–6 March 2016; Vélodrome Amédée Détraux, Baie-Mahault, Guadeloupe, France; World Group first round; clay surface
| Win | 14 | I | Singles | Canada | Frank Dancevic | 6–3, 6–1, 6–3 |

=== Summer Olympics matches ===
==== Singles ====
2008 Summer Olympics (Beijing)
| Round | Opponent | Result | Score |
| 1R | (Spain) Nicolás Almagro | Win | 6–4, 3–6, 6–3 |
| 2R | (Romania) Victor Hănescu | Win | 6–4, 7–6^{(7–5)} |
| 3R | (Argentina) David Nalbandian | Win | 6–4, 6–4 |
| QF | (Serbia) Novak Djokovic | Loss | 6–4, 1–6, 4–6 |

2016 Summer Olympics (Rio de Janeiro)
| Round | Opponent | Result | Score |
| 1R | (Canada) Vasek Pospisil | Win | 6–1, 6–3 |
| 2R | (Brazil) Rogério Dutra Silva | Win | 6–2, 6–4 |
| 3R | (Croatia) Marin Čilić | Win | 6–7^{(6–8)}, 6–3, 6–4 |
| QF | (Japan) Kei Nishikori | Loss | 6–7^{(4–7)}, 6–4, 6–7^{(6–8)} |

2020 Summer Olympics (Tokyo)
| Round | Opponent | Result | Score |
| 1R | (Belarus) Ilya Ivashka | Loss | 4–6, 6–4, 5–7 |

2024 Summer Olympics (Paris)
| Round | Opponent | Result | Score |
| 1R | (Italy) Lorenzo Musetti | Loss | 1–6, 4–6 |

==== Doubles ====
2008 Summer Olympics (Beijing)
Partner: (France) Gilles Simon
| Round | Opponents | Result | Score |
| 1R | (India) Mahesh Bhupathi (India) Leander Paes | Loss | 3–6, 3–6 |

2016 Summer Olympics (Rio de Janeiro)
Partner: (France) Jo-Wilfried Tsonga
| Round | Opponents | Result | Score |
| 1R | (United States) Brian Baker (United States) Rajeev Ram | Loss | 1–6, 4–6 |

2020 Summer Olympics (Tokyo)
Partner: (France) Jérémy Chardy
| Round | Opponents | Result | Score |
| 1R | (Kazakhstan) Alexander Bublik (Kazakhstan) Andrey Golubev | Win | 6–7^{(4–7)}, 7–6^{(7–3)}, [10–8] |
| 2R | (Germany) Jan-Lennard Struff (Germany) Alexander Zverev | Loss | 4–6, 5–7 |

2024 Summer Olympics (Paris)
Partner: (France) Édouard Roger-Vasselin
| Round | Opponents | Result | Score |
| 1R | (India) Sriram Balaji (India) Rohan Bopanna | Win | 7–5, 6–2 |
| 2R | (Germany) Kevin Krawietz (Germany) Tim Pütz | Loss | 3–6, 1–6 |

== ATP Challenger and ITF Tour finals ==
=== Singles: 8 (7 titles, 1 runner-up) ===
| Legend ATP Challenger Tour (6–0) ITF Futures (1–1) | Finals by surface Hard (3–0) Clay (3–1) Carpet (1–0) |

| Result | W–L | Date | Tournament | Tier | Surface | Opponent | Score |
|---|---|---|---|---|---|---|---|
| Win | 1–0 | Feb 2005 | Besançon Challenger, France | Challenger | Hard (i) | (Belgium) Christophe Rochus | 6–3, 2–6, 6–3 |
| Win | 2–0 | May 2005 | Tunis Open, Tunisia | Challenger | Clay | (France) Fabrice Santoro | 7–5, 3–6, 7–6^{(11–9)} |
| Win | 3–0 | Mar 2007 | Sunrise Challenger, US | Challenger | Hard | (Italy) Andreas Seppi | 6–3, 1–6, 6–1 |
| Win | 4–0 | May 2008 | Marrakech Open, Morocco | Challenger | Clay | (France) Jérémy Chardy | 7–6^{(7–2)}, 7–6^{(8–6)} |
| Win | 5–0 | May 2013 | Bordeaux Challenger, France | Challenger | Clay | (Slovenia) Grega Žemlja | 7–5, 7–6^{(7–5)} |
| Win | 6–0 | Sep 2018 | Kaohsiung Challenger, Chinese Taipei | Challenger | Hard | (South Korea) Soonwoo Kwon | 6–4, 2–6, 6–1 |
| Loss | 0–1 | Apr 2004 | F4 Bergamo, Italy | Futures | Clay | (Czech Republic) Lukáš Dlouhý | 3–6, 6–1, 1–6 |
| Win | 1–1 | May 2004 | F1 Glasgow, UK | Futures | Carpet (i) | (United Kingdom) Alex Bogdanovic | 6–4, 6–3 |

=== Doubles: 2 (2 runner-ups) ===
| Legend ATP Challenger Tour (0–0) ITF Futures (0–2) |

| Result | W–L | Date | Tournament | Tier | Surface | Partner | Opponents | Score |
|---|---|---|---|---|---|---|---|---|
| Loss | 0–1 | Nov 2003 | ITF Gran Canaria, Spain | Futures | Clay | (France) Josselin Ouanna | (Spain) Emilio Benfele Álvarez (Spain) Germán Puentes | 3–6, 4–6 |
| Loss | 0–2 | Apr 2004 | ITF Poitiers, France | Futures | Carpet (i) | (France) Josselin Ouanna | (France) Gilles Simon (France) Jo-Wilfried Tsonga | 5–7, 2–6 |

== ITF Junior Circuit ==
=== Singles: 9 (5 titles, 4 runner-ups) ===
Legend
Category GA (3–1)
Category G1 (2–2)
Category G2 (0–1)
Category G3 (0–0)
Category G4 (0–0)
Category G5 (0–0)

| Result | W–L | Date | Tournament | Tier | Surface | Opponent | Score |
|---|---|---|---|---|---|---|---|
| Loss | 0–1 | Jul 2002 | Dutch Junior Open, The Netherlands | Category G2 | Clay | (Germany) Andreas Weber | 7–6, 2–6, 6–7 |
| Win | 1–1 | Jul 2002 | German Junior Open, Germany | Category G1 | Clay | (Germany) Markus Bayer | 6–1, 2–6, 7–5 |
| Loss | 1–2 | Dec 2003 | USTA International Winter Championships, USA | Category G1 | Hard | (Germany) Sebastian Rieschick | 3–6, 7–6^{(7–5)}, 4–6 |
| Loss | 1–3 | Dec 2003 | Orange Bowl, USA | Category GA | Hard | (Cyprus) Marcos Baghdatis | 6–4, 5–7, 3–6 |
| Loss | 1–4 | Jan 2004 | Australian Hardcourt Championships, Australia | Category G1 | Hard | (Germany) Mischa Zverev | 5–7, 6–2, 3–6 |
| Win | 2–4 | Jan 2004 | Australian Open, Australia | Category GA | Hard | (France) Josselin Ouanna | 6–0, 6–3 |
| Win | 3–4 | Jun 2004 | French Open, France | Category GA | Clay | (United States) Alex Kuznetsov | 6–2, 6–2 |
| Win | 4–4 | Jun 2004 | LTA International Junior Championships, UK | Category G1 | Grass | (United Kingdom) Andy Murray | 7–5, 6–3 |
| Win | 5–4 | Jul 2004 | Wimbledon, UK | Category GA | Grass | (United Kingdom) Miles Kasiri | 7–5, 7–6^{(8–6)} |

=== Doubles: 1 (1 title) ===
Legend
Category GA (0–0)
Category G1 (0–0)
Category G2 (1–0)
Category G3 (0–0)
Category G4 (0–0)
Category G5 (0–0)

| Result | W–L | Date | Tournament | Tier | Surface | Partner | Opponents | Score |
|---|---|---|---|---|---|---|---|---|
| Win | 1–0 | Jan 2003 | Victorian Junior Championships, Australia | Category G2 | Hard | (France) Josselin Ouanna | (Latvia) Andis Juška (Germany) Mischa Zverev | 6–3, 2–6, 6–4 |

== Wins over top 10 players ==
- Monfils has a 38–100 (27.54%) record against players who were, at the time the match was played, ranked in the top 10.

| Season | 2005 | 2006 | 2007 | 2008 | 2009 | 2010 | 2011 | 2012 | 2013 | 2014 | 2015 | 2016 | 2017 | 2018 | 2019 | 2022 | 2023 | 2024 | 2025 | 2026 | Total |
|---|---|---|---|---|---|---|---|---|---|---|---|---|---|---|---|---|---|---|---|---|---|
| Wins | 1 | 3 | 3 | 5 | 2 | 4 | 1 | 1 | 2 | 4 | 1 | 2 | 1 | 2 | 1 | 1 | 1 | 2 | 1 | 0 | 38 |

| # | Opponent | Rank | Event | Surface | Rd | Score | GMR |
|---|---|---|---|---|---|---|---|
2005
| 1. | (Argentina) Gastón Gaudio | No. 10 | Qatar Open, Qatar | Hard | 1R | 6–4, 7–6^{(7–4)} | No. 239 |
2006
| 2. | (United States) Andy Roddick | No. 5 | Italian Open, Italy | Clay | QF | 6–2, 6–3 | No. 35 |
| 3. | (United States) James Blake | No. 8 | French Open, France | Clay | 3R | 6–2, 6–7^{(2–7)}, 7–6^{(7–1)}, 5–7, 6–4 | No. 28 |
| 4. | (Croatia) Ivan Ljubičić | No. 4 | Queen's Club Championships, UK | Grass | 3R | 7–6^{(13–11)}, 7–5 | No. 23 |
2007
| 5. | (United States) Andy Roddick | No. 3 | Hypo Group Open, Austria | Clay | QF | 7–5, 6–3 | No. 75 |
| 6. | (Russia) Nikolay Davydenko | No. 5 | Swiss Open, Switzerland | Clay | 1R | 3–6, 6–4, 7–5 | No. 57 |
| 7. | (Spain) Tommy Robredo | No. 7 | Stuttgart Open, Germany | Clay | 1R | 7–6^{(7–5)}, 6–2 | No. 56 |
2008
| 8. | (Spain) David Ferrer | No. 5 | French Open, France | Clay | QF | 6–3, 3–6, 6–3, 6–1 | No. 59 |
| 9. | (Argentina) David Nalbandian | No. 8 | Olympics, China | Hard | 3R | 6–4, 6–4 | No. 43 |
| 10. | (Argentina) David Nalbandian | No. 7 | US Open, US | Hard | 3R | 6–3, 6–4, 6–2 | No. 33 |
| 11. | (Chile) Fernando González | No. 10 | Madrid Open, Spain | Hard (i) | 2R | 6–3, 6–4 | No. 18 |
| 12. | (United States) Andy Roddick | No. 8 | Madrid Open, Spain | Hard (i) | 3R | 6–4, 3–6, 6–3 | No. 18 |
2009
| 13. | (Spain) Rafael Nadal | No. 1 | Qatar Open, Qatar | Hard | QF | 6–4, 6–4 | No. 13 |
| 14. | (United States) Andy Roddick | No. 5 | French Open, France | Clay | 4R | 6–4, 6–2, 6–3 | No. 10 |
2010
| 15. | (United States) Andy Roddick | No. 10 | Japan Open, Japan | Hard | QF | 7–6^{(7–5)}, 4–6, 7–6^{(8–6)} | No. 15 |
| 16. | (Spain) Fernando Verdasco | No. 9 | Paris Masters, France | Hard (i) | 3R | 6–7^{(4–7)}, 7–6^{(7–2)}, 7–5 | No. 14 |
| 17. | (United Kingdom) Andy Murray | No. 4 | Paris Masters, France | Hard (i) | QF | 6–2, 2–6, 6–3 | No. 14 |
| 18. | (Switzerland) Roger Federer | No. 2 | Paris Masters, France | Hard (i) | SF | 7–6^{(9–7)}, 6–7^{(1–7)}, 7–6^{(7–4)} | No. 14 |
2011
| 19. | (Spain) David Ferrer | No. 5 | French Open, France | Clay | 4R | 6–4, 2–6, 7–5, 1–6, 8–6 | No. 9 |
2012
| 20. | (Spain) Rafael Nadal | No. 2 | Qatar Open, Qatar | Hard | SF | 6–3, 6–4 | No. 16 |
2013
| 21. | (Czech Republic) Tomáš Berdych | No. 6 | French Open, France | Clay | 1R | 7–6^{(10–8)}, 6–4, 6–7^{(3–7)}, 6–7^{(4–7)}, 7–5 | No. 81 |
| 22. | (Switzerland) Roger Federer | No. 7 | Shanghai Masters, China | Hard | 3R | 6–4, 6–7^{(5–7)}, 6–3 | No. 42 |
2014
| 23. | (France) Richard Gasquet | No. 9 | Qatar Open, Qatar | Hard | 2R | 6–2, 7–5 | No. 31 |
| 24. | (France) Richard Gasquet | No. 9 | Open Sud de France, France | Hard (i) | F | 6–4, 6-4 | No. 30 |
| 25. | (Bulgaria) Grigor Dimitrov | No. 8 | US Open, US | Hard | 4R | 7–5, 7–6^{(8–6)}, 7–5 | No. 24 |
| 26. | (Switzerland) Roger Federer | No. 2 | Davis Cup, France | Clay (i) | F | 6–1, 6–4, 6–3 | No. 19 |
2015
| 27. | (Switzerland) Roger Federer | No. 2 | Monte-Carlo Masters, France | Clay | 3R | 6–4, 7–6^{(7–5)} | No. 18 |
2016
| 28. | (France) Jo-Wilfried Tsonga | No. 9 | Monte-Carlo Masters, France | Clay | SF | 6–1, 6–3 | No. 16 |
| 29. | (Canada) Milos Raonic | No. 7 | Canadian Open, Canada | Hard | QF | 6–4, 6–4 | No. 14 |
2017
| 30. | (Japan) Kei Nishikori | No. 9 | Canadian Open, Canada | Hard | 2R | 6–7^{(4–7)}, 7–5, 7–6^{(8–6)} | No. 22 |
2018
| 31. | (Croatia) Marin Čilić | No. 3 | Rio Open, Brazil | Clay | 2R | 6–3, 7–6^{(10–8)} | No. 39 |
| 32. | (United States) John Isner | No. 9 | Vienna Open, Austria | Hard (i) | 2R | 6–4, 6–4 | No. 33 |
2019
| 33. | (Croatia) Marin Čilić | No. 10 | Dubai Open, UAE | Hard | 1R | 6–3, 4–6, 6–0 | No. 23 |
2022
| 34. | Daniil Medvedev | No. 1 | Indian Wells Open, US | Hard | 3R | 4–6, 6–3, 6–1 | No. 28 |
2023
| 35. | (Greece) Stefanos Tsitsipas | No. 4 | Canadian Open, Canada | Hard | 2R | 6–4, 6–3 | No. 276 |
2024
| 36. | (Poland) Hubert Hurkacz | No. 8 | Indian Wells Open, US | Hard | 2R | 6–0, 6–7^{(5–7)}, 6–2 | No. 54 |
| 37. | (Spain) Carlos Alcaraz | No. 3 | Cincinnati Open, US | Hard | 2R | 4–6, 7–6^{(7–5)}, 6–4 | No. 46 |
2025
| 38. | (United States) Taylor Fritz | No. 4 | Australian Open, Australia | Hard | 3R | 3–6, 7–5, 7–6^{(7–1)}, 6–4 | No. 41 |

=== Doubles ===
| Season | 2017 | Total |
| Wins | 1 | 1 |

| # | Partner | Opponents | Rank | Event | Surface | Rd | Score | GMR |
|---|---|---|---|---|---|---|---|---|
2017
| 1. | (France) Benoît Paire | (United Kingdom) Jamie Murray (Brazil) Bruno Soares | 5; 6 | Canadian Open, Canada | Hard | 2R | 7–6^{(7–4)}, 6–7^{(5–7)}, [10–5] | No Rank |

== Career Grand Slam tournament seedings ==
The tournaments won by Monfils are bolded.

=== Singles ===
| Legend seeded No. 1 (0 / 0) seeded No. 2 (0 / 0) seeded No. 3 (0 / 0) seeded No. 4–10 (0 / 8) Seeded outside the top 10 (0 / 36) not seeded (0 / 16) qualifier (0 / 0) wild card (0 / 3) lucky loser (0 / 0) alternate (0 / 0) special exempt (0 / 0) protected ranking (0 / 2) | Longest streak 0 0 0 3 9 5 0 2 0 0 0 2 |

| Year | Australian Open | French Open | Wimbledon | US Open |
|---|---|---|---|---|
| 2004 | did not play | Lost in Qualifying | did not play | did not play |
| 2005 | wild card | wild card | not seeded | not seeded |
| 2006 | 22nd | 25th | 21st | 27th |
| 2007 | not seeded | not seeded | not seeded | did not play |
| 2008 | did not play | not seeded | did not play | 32nd |
| 2009 | 12th | 11th | did not play | 13th |
| 2010 | 12th | 13th | 21st | 17th |
| 2011 | 12th | 9th | 9th | 7th |
| 2012 | 14th | did not play | did not play | did not play |
| 2013 | not seeded | wild card | did not play | not seeded |
| 2014 | 25th | 23rd | 24th | 20th |
| 2015 | 17th | 13th | 18th | 16th |
| 2016 | 23rd | did not play | 17th | 10th |
| 2017 | 6th | 15th | 15th | 18th |
| 2018 | not seeded | 32nd | not seeded | not seeded |
| 2019 | 30th | 14th | 16th | 13th |
| 2020 | 10th | 8th | not held | did not play |
| 2021 | 10th | 14th | 13th | 17th |
| 2022 | 17th | did not play | did not play | did not play |
| 2023 | did not play | PR | did not play | PR |
| 2024 | not seeded | not seeded | not seeded | not seeded |
| 2025 | not seeded | | | |

== ATP career earnings ==
| Year | Majors | ATP Wins | Total wins | Earnings ($) | Money list rank |
|---|---|---|---|---|---|
| 2003 | 0 | 0 | 0 | $1,953 | 1053 |
| 2004 | 0 | 0 | 0 | $40,259 | 298 |
| 2005 | 0 | 1 | 1 | $473,892 | 48 |
| 2006 | 0 | 0 | 0 | $475,407 | 47 |
| 2007 | 0 | 0 | 0 | $367,225 | 69 |
| 2008 | 0 | 0 | 0 | $889,581 | 18 |
| 2009 | 0 | 1 | 1 | 1,290,794 | 12 |
| 2010 | 0 | 1 | 1 | 1,303,546 | 12 |
| 2011 | 0 | 1 | 1 | $1,094,353 | 19 |
| 2012 | 0 | 0 | 0 | $367,722 | 85 |
| 2013 | 0 | 0 | 0 | $647,271 | 54 |
| 2014 | 0 | 1 | 1 | $1,306,554 | 22 |
| 2015 | 0 | 0 | 0 | $1,069,706 | 30 |
| 2016 | 0 | 1 | 1 | $3,372,418 | 7 |
| 2017 | 0 | 0 | 0 | $1,043,358 | 46 |
| 2018 | 0 | 1 | 1 | $1,269,851 | 34 |
| 2019 | 0 | 1 | 1 | $2,601,587 | 9 |
| 2020 | 0 | 2 | 2 | $1,297,224 | 12 |
| 2021 | 0 | 0 | 0 | $1,013,517 | 37 |
| 2022 | 0 | 1 | 1 | $741,855 | 74 |
| 2023 | 0 | 1 | 1 | $742,309 | 97 |
| 2024 | 0 | 0 | 0 | $1,520,087 | 40 |
| 2025 | 0 | 1 | 1 | $1,132,623 | 77 |
| 2026 | 0 | 0 | 0 | $418,793 | 150 |
| Career* | 0 | 13 | 13 | $25,067,477 | 25 |

* Statistics correct as of 24 August 2026.

== Notable exhibitions ==
=== Team competitions ===
| Result | Date | Tournament | Surface | Team | Partners | Opponent team | Opponent players | Score |
|---|---|---|---|---|---|---|---|---|
| Win | May 2009 | Masters Guinot-Mary Cohr, Paris, France | Clay | Team Guinot | (Russia) Marat Safin (C) (Switzerland) Roger Federer (United Kingdom) Andy Murray (Spain) Rafael Nadal (Spain) Tommy Robredo | Team Mary Cohr | (United States) James Blake (C) (Switzerland) Stan Wawrinka (Cyprus) Marcos Baghdatis (France) Arnaud Clément (France) Fabrice Santoro (France) Paul-Henri Mathieu | 4–2 |
| Loss | Sep 2023 | Laver Cup | Hard (i) | Team Europe | Andrey Rublev; Casper Ruud; Hubert Hurkacz; Alejandro Davidovich Fokina; Arthur Fils | Team World | Taylor Fritz; Frances Tiafoe; Tommy Paul; Félix Auger-Aliassime; Ben Shelton; Francisco Cerúndolo | 2–13 |
