= 2006 Grand Prix de Tennis de Lyon =

- Date: 23–30 October 2006
- Edition: 20th
- Category: International Series
- Draw: 32S / 16D
- Prize money: $775,000
- Surface: Carpet / indoor
- Location: Lyon, France
- Venue: Palais des Sports de Gerland

Champions

Singles
- (France) Richard Gasquet

Doubles
- (France) Julien Benneteau / (France) Arnaud Clément
| ← 2005 · | Grand Prix de Tennis de Lyon | · 2007 → |

The 2006 Grand Prix de Tennis de Lyon was a men's tennis tournament played on indoor carpet courts. It was played at the Palais des Sports de Gerland in Lyon, France, and was part of the International Series tournaments of the 2006 ATP Tour.It was the 20th edition of the tournament and took place from 23 October through 30 October 2006. Fourth-seeded Richard Gasquet won the singles title.

== Finals ==
=== Singles ===
(France) Richard Gasquet defeated (France) Marc Gicquel 6–3, 6–1

- It was Gasquet's 3rd singles title of the year and the 4th of his career.

=== Doubles ===
(France) Julien Benneteau / (France) Arnaud Clément defeated (Czech Republic) František Čermák / (Czech Republic) Jaroslav Levinský 6–2, 6–7^{(3–7)}, [10–7]

- It was Benneteau's only title of the year and the 2nd of his career. It was Clément's 3rd title of the year and the 10th of his career.
