= 2018 Qatar ExxonMobil Open – Doubles =

Doubles
- 2018 Qatar ExxonMobil Open

Final
- Champions: (Austria) Oliver Marach; (Croatia) Mate Pavić
- Runners-up: (United Kingdom) Jamie Murray; (Brazil) Bruno Soares
- Score: 6–2, 7–6^{(8–6)}

Details
- Draw: 16
- Seeds: 4

Events
Singles	Doubles
← 2017 ·	ATP Qatar Open	· 2019 →

Jérémy Chardy and Fabrice Martin were the defending champions, but Chardy chose not to participate this year and Martin chose to compete in Brisbane instead.

Oliver Marach and Mate Pavić won the title, defeating Jamie Murray and Bruno Soares in the final, 6–2, 7–6^{(8–6)}.

== Seeds ==
1. (United Kingdom) Jamie Murray / (Brazil) Bruno Soares (final)
2. (Austria) Oliver Marach / (Croatia) Mate Pavić (champions)
3. (Spain) Feliciano López / (United States) Rajeev Ram (semifinals)
4. (Croatia) Ivan Dodig / (Spain) Fernando Verdasco (quarterfinals)

== Draw ==
=== Key ===
- Q = Qualifier
- WC = Wild card
- LL = Lucky loser
- Alt = Alternate
- ITF = ITF entry
- PR = Protected ranking
- SR = Special ranking
- SE = Special exempt
- JE = Junior exempt
- JR = Junior Accelerator Programme entrant
- CO = College Accelerator Programme entrant
- NG = Next Gen Accelerator Program entrant
- w/o = Walkover
- r = Retired
- d = Defaulted

=== Draw ===
First round

Quarterfinals

Semifinals

Final

1
(United Kingdom) J Murray
(Brazil) B Soares
3
7^{7}
[10]

- (Poland) M Matkowski
- (Pakistan) A-u-H Qureshi
6
6^{5}
[5]

1
(United Kingdom) J Murray
(Brazil) B Soares
6
6

- (Serbia) F Krajinović
- (Serbia) V Troicki
6^{6}
4

- (Croatia) B Ćorić
- (Germany) J-L Struff
3
4

(Croatia) B Ćorić
(Germany) J-L Struff
7^{8}
6

1
(United Kingdom) J Murray
(Brazil) B Soares
6
4
[10]

3
(Spain) F López
(United States) R Ram
7
6

3
- (Spain) F López
- (United States) R Ram
3
6
[6]

WC
- (Tunisia) M Jaziri
- (Qatar) MS Zayed
5
2

3
(Spain) F López
(United States) R Ram
6
6

- (Croatia) N Mektić
- (Austria) A Peya
6
6^{8}
[8]

PR
- (Georgia (country)) N Basilashvili
- (Austria) A Haider-Maurer
2
2

PR
(Georgia (country)) N Basilashvili
(Austria) A Haider-Maurer
1
7^{10}
[10]

1
- (United Kingdom) J Murray
- (Brazil) B Soares
2
6^{6}

(Spain) P Carreño Busta
(Spain) G García López
6
7^{7}

2
(Austria) O Marach
(Croatia) M Pavić
6
7^{8}

- (Italy) P Lorenzi
- (Spain) A Ramos Viñolas
2
6^{4}

(Spain) P Carreño Busta
(Spain) G García López
6
5
[10]

- (Romania) F Mergea
- (Serbia) N Zimonjić
1
4

4
- (Croatia) I Dodig
- (Spain) F Verdasco
3
7
[7]

4
(Croatia) I Dodig
(Spain) F Verdasco
6
6

- (Spain) P Carreño Busta
- (Spain) G García López
3
4

- (Germany) P Gojowczyk
- (Germany) F Mayer
7
2
[8]

2
(Austria) O Marach
(Croatia) M Pavić
6
6

WC
(Turkey) T Altuna
(Sweden) E Ymer
5
6
[10]

WC
- (Turkey) T Altuna
- (Sweden) E Ymer
2
3

- (Canada) D Nestor
- (Austria) P Oswald
2
2

2
(Austria) O Marach
(Croatia) M Pavić
6
6

2
(Austria) O Marach
(Croatia) M Pavić
6
6
