= 2005 Grand Prix de Tennis de Lyon – Singles =

Singles
- 2005 Grand Prix de Tennis de Lyon

Final
- Champion: (United States) Andy Roddick
- Runner-up: (France) Gaël Monfils
- Score: 6–3, 6–2

Events
Singles	Doubles
← 2004 ·	Grand Prix de Tennis de Lyon	· 2006 →

Robin Söderling was the defending champion, but did not participate this year.

Andy Roddick won the tournament, beating Gaël Monfils 6–3, 6–2 in the final.

== Seeds ==
1. (United States) Andy Roddick (champion)
2. (Argentina) Mariano Puerta (first round)
3. (Argentina) Gastón Gaudio (second round)
4. (Croatia) Ivan Ljubičić (first round)
5. (Spain) Tommy Robredo (second round)
6. (Spain) David Ferrer (first round)
7. (Croatia) Mario Ančić (quarterfinals)
8. (United States) Robby Ginepri (first round, retired due to a stomach virus)

== Draw ==
Key

- Q = Qualifier
- WC = Wild card
- LL = Lucky loser
- Alt = Alternate
- ITF = ITF entry
- PR = Protected ranking
- SR = Special ranking
- SE = Special exempt
- JE = Junior exempt
- JR = Junior Accelerator Programme entrant
- CO = College Accelerator Programme entrant
- NG = Next Gen Accelerator Program entrant
- w/o = Walkover
- r = Retired
- d = Defaulted

=== Finals ===
Semifinals
1	(United States) Andy Roddick	6	7^{7}
(France) Fabrice Santoro	4	6^{5}
(France) Gaël Monfils	6	7
(France) Sébastien Grosjean	4	5

Final
1	(United States) Andy Roddick	6	6
(France) Gaël Monfils	3	2

=== Top half ===
First round
1	(United States) A Roddick	7	6
WC	(France) T Ascione	5	3
Q	(France) N Mahut	6	7
WC	(France) J Benneteau	4	5
Q	(France) G Carraz	1	4
Q	(Sweden) T Enqvist	6	6
(United States) J Blake	2	6^{5}
7	(Croatia) M Ančić	6	7^{7}
4	(Croatia) I Ljubičić	6^{5}	5
(United States) V Spadea	7^{7}	7
(Belgium) X Malisse	6^{6}	3
WC	(France) M Llodra	7^{8}	6
(France) F Santoro	6	7
(United States) T Dent	3	5
(France) P-H Mathieu	5
8	(United States) R Ginepri	2^{r}

Second round
1	(United States) A Roddick	7^{7}	6
Q	(France) N Mahut	6^{5}	3
Q	(Sweden) T Enqvist	7^{7}	6^{5}	4
7	(Croatia) M Ančić	6^{4}	7^{7}	6
(United States) V Spadea	6	6
WC	(France) M Llodra	4	3
(France) F Santoro	6	6
(France) P-H Mathieu	1	4

Quarterfinals
1	(United States) A Roddick	6	6
7	(Croatia) M Ančić	4	4
(United States) V Spadea	2	2
(France) F Santoro	6	6

Semifinals
1	(United States) A Roddick	6	7^{7}
(France) F Santoro	4	6^{5}

=== Bottom half ===
First round
6	(Spain) D Ferrer	4	0
Q	(France) M Gicquel	6	6
(Italy) D Sanguinetti	6^{5}	6	6
(Spain) F López	7^{7}	4	4
(France) G Monfils	6	5	6
(Czech Republic) J Hernych	4	7	3
(France) A Clément	3	6	3
3	(Argentina) G Gaudio	6	4	6
5	(Spain) T Robredo	2	7	6
(Ecuador) N Lapentti	6	5	4
(France) S Grosjean	4	6	6
(Romania) V Hănescu	6	3	4
(Serbia and Montenegro) N Djokovic	7^{7}	6
(Brazil) R Mello	6^{5}	4
(Belgium) O Rochus	4	7	6
2	(Argentina) M Puerta	6	5	3

Second round
Q	(France) M Gicquel	6	6
(Italy) D Sanguinetti	3	2
(France) G Monfils	6	6
3	(Argentina) G Gaudio	4	3
5	(Spain) T Robredo	5	3
(France) S Grosjean	7	6
(Serbia and Montenegro) N Djokovic	6^{4}	5
(Belgium) O Rochus	7^{7}	7

Quarterfinals
Q	(France) M Gicquel	4	1
(France) G Monfils	6	6
(France) S Grosjean	6	7^{7}
(Belgium) O Rochus	3	6^{4}

Semifinals
(France) G Monfils	6	7
(France) S Grosjean	4	5
