= 2004 Grand Prix de Tennis de Lyon – Singles =

Singles
- 2004 Grand Prix de Tennis de Lyon

Final
- Champion: (Sweden) Robin Söderling
- Runner-up: (Belgium) Xavier Malisse
- Score: 6–2, 3–6, 6–4

Details
- Draw: 32
- Seeds: 8

Events
Singles	Doubles
← 2003 ·	Grand Prix de Tennis de Lyon	· 2005 →

Rainer Schüttler was the defending champion, but lost in the first round this year.

Robin Söderling won the tournament, beating Xavier Malisse 6–2, 3–6, 6–4 in the final.

== Seeds ==
1. (Chile) Nicolás Massú (first round)
2. (Germany) Rainer Schüttler (first round)
3. (Spain) Juan Carlos Ferrero (second round)
4. (Sweden) Joachim Johansson (quarterfinals)
5. (Spain) Tommy Robredo (first round)
6. (Slovakia) Dominik Hrbatý (first round)
7. (United States) Vincent Spadea (semifinals)
8. (Croatia) Mario Ančić (first round, retired due to a shoulder injury)

== Draw ==
=== Key ===
- Q = Qualifier
- WC = Wild card
- LL = Lucky loser
- Alt = Alternate
- SE = Special exempt
- PR = Protected ranking
- ITF = ITF entry
- JE = Junior exempt
- w/o = Walkover
- r = Retired
- d = Defaulted
- SR = Special ranking

=== Finals ===
Semifinals
(Belgium) Xavier Malisse	6	6
(Spain) David Ferrer	4	2
(Sweden) Robin Söderling	6	6
7	(United States) Vincent Spadea	2	4

Final
(Belgium) Xavier Malisse	2	6	4
(Sweden) Robin Söderling	6	3	6

=== Top half ===
First round
1	(Chile) N Massú	3	4
(Argentina) A Calleri	6	6
(Peru) L Horna	4	6^{1}
(Russia) M Youzhny	6	7^{7}
Q	(Czech Republic) R Štěpánek	4	7	6
WC	(France) P-H Mathieu	6	5	2
(Belgium) X Malisse	6	7^{7}
6	(Slovakia) D Hrbatý	4	6^{4}
3	(Spain) JC Ferrero	6	7^{7}
(Armenia) S Sargsian	3	6^{4}
(Spain) D Ferrer	6	6
Q	(Netherlands) R Sluiter	3	4
(Spain) A Costa	7^{7}	6^{6}	4
(Sweden) J Björkman	6^{5}	7^{8}	6
Q	(Belarus) M Mirnyi	6	3
8	(Croatia) M Ančić	3	1^{r}

Second round
(Argentina) A Calleri	3	7^{7}	6^{4}
(Russia) M Youzhny	6	6^{2}	7^{7}
Q	(Czech Republic) R Štěpánek	6	6^{4}	0
(Belgium) X Malisse	4	7^{7}	6
3	(Spain) JC Ferrero	6	5	3
(Spain) D Ferrer	3	7	6
(Sweden) J Björkman	6^{3}	7^{7}	6
Q	(Belarus) M Mirnyi	7^{7}	6^{5}	4

Quarterfinals
(Russia) M Youzhny	3	4
(Belgium) X Malisse	6	6
(Spain) D Ferrer	6	6
(Sweden) J Björkman	2	4

Semifinals
(Belgium) X Malisse	6	6
(Spain) D Ferrer	4	2

=== Bottom half ===
First round
5	(Spain) T Robredo	1	4
(Sweden) R Söderling	6	6
(Spain) F López	6	6^{2}	6
(Russia) N Davydenko	3	7^{7}	3
(Spain) R Nadal	3	0
Q	(France) J Benneteau	6	6
SE	(Argentina) J Mónaco	4	3
4	(Sweden) J Johansson	6	6
7	(United States) V Spadea	6	6
(United States) R Ginepri	4	3
(Croatia) I Ljubičić	6	7^{7}
WC	(France) A Clément	4	6^{1}
(Austria) J Melzer	7^{7}	6
WC	(France) M Llodra	6^{2}	4
(Morocco) H Arazi	6	1	6
2	(Germany) R Schüttler	4	6	3

Second round
(Sweden) R Söderling	4	6	6
(Spain) F López	6	3	3
Q	(France) J Benneteau	3	4
4	(Sweden) J Johansson	6	6
7	(United States) V Spadea	6	7^{7}
(Croatia) I Ljubičić	4	6^{4}
(Austria) J Melzer	4	7^{7}	6
(Morocco) H Arazi	6	6^{4}	1

Quarterfinals
(Sweden) R Söderling	6	6
4	(Sweden) J Johansson	3	4
7	(United States) V Spadea	1	6	7^{7}
(Austria) J Melzer	6	1	6^{2}

Semifinals
(Sweden) R Söderling	6	6
7	(United States) V Spadea	2	4
