= 2005 Grand Prix de Tennis de Lyon =

- Date: 24–31 October 2005
- Edition: 19th
- Category: International Series
- Draw: 32S / 16D
- Prize money: $775,000
- Surface: Carpet / indoors
- Location: Lyon, France
- Venue: Palais des Sports de Gerland

Champions

Singles
- (United States) Andy Roddick

Doubles
- (France) Michaël Llodra / (France) Fabrice Santoro
← 2004 ·	Grand Prix de Tennis de Lyon	· 2006 →

The 2005 Grand Prix de Tennis de Lyon was a men's tennis tournament played on indoor carpet. It was played at the Palais des Sports de Gerland in Lyon, France, and was part of the 2005 ATP Tour. It was the 19th edition of the tournament and took place from 24 October through 31 October 2005. First-seeded Andy Roddick won the singles title.

== Finals ==
=== Singles ===
(United States) Andy Roddick defeated (France) Gaël Monfils 6–3, 6–2

- It was Roddick's 5th singles title of the year and the 20th of his career.

=== Doubles ===
(France) Michaël Llodra / (France) Fabrice Santoro defeated (South Africa) Jeff Coetzee / (Netherlands) Rogier Wassen 6–3, 6–1

- It was Llodra's 3rd title of the year and the 9th of his career. It was Santoro's 3rd title of the year and the 21st of his career.
