= 2017 Qatar ExxonMobil Open – Doubles =

Doubles
- 2017 Qatar ExxonMobil Open

Final
- Champions: (France) Jérémy Chardy (France) Fabrice Martin
- Runners-up: (Canada) Vasek Pospisil (Czech Republic) Radek Štěpánek
- Score: 6–4, 7–6^{(7–3)}

Details
- Draw: 16
- Seeds: 4

Events
Singles	Doubles
← 2016 ·	ATP Qatar Open	· 2018 →

Feliciano López and Marc López were the defending champions, but Marc chose not to participate this year and Feliciano chose to compete at the Hopman Cup instead.
Jérémy Chardy and Fabrice Martin won the title, defeating Vasek Pospisil and Radek Štěpánek in the final, 6–4, 7–6^{(7–3)}.

== Seeds ==
1. (United Kingdom) Jamie Murray / (Brazil) Bruno Soares (semifinals)
2. (Croatia) Mate Pavić / (Austria) Alexander Peya (first round)
3. (Canada) Vasek Pospisil / (Czech Republic) Radek Štěpánek (final)
4. (United Kingdom) Dominic Inglot / (Romania) Florin Mergea (quarterfinals)

== Draw ==
=== Key ===
- Q = Qualifier
- WC = Wild card
- LL = Lucky loser
- Alt = Alternate
- SE = Special exempt
- PR = Protected ranking
- ITF = ITF entry
- JE = Junior exempt
- w/o = Walkover
- r = Retired
- d = Defaulted
- SR = Special ranking

First round
1	(United Kingdom) J Murray (Brazil) B Soares	6	6
(Cyprus) M Baghdatis (Poland) M Matkowski	3	1
(Spain) D Marrero (Serbia) N Zimonjić	6	6
(Poland) M Fyrstenberg (United Kingdom) A Murray	2	4
4	(United Kingdom) D Inglot (Romania) F Mergea	6	6
(Russia) K Khachanov (Russia) A Kuznetsov	2	3
WC	(Tunisia) M Jaziri (Qatar) MS Zayid	2	3
(France) J Chardy (France) F Martin	6	6
WC	(Qatar) JM Ali Mutawa (Qatar) MS Zayed	3	1
PR	(Netherlands) R Haase (Germany) P Petzschner	6	6
(Italy) P Lorenzi (Germany) F Mayer	3	4
3	(Canada) V Pospisil (Czech Republic) R Štěpánek	6	6
(Argentina) F Bagnis (Czech Republic) J Veselý	6	7^{9}
(Germany) P Kohlschreiber (Germany) J-L Struff	4	6^{7}
(Spain) N Almagro (Spain) F Verdasco	7^{7}	5	[10]
2	(Croatia) M Pavić (Austria) A Peya	6^{3}	7	[7]

Quarterfinals
1	(United Kingdom) J Murray (Brazil) B Soares	7	4	[10]
(Spain) D Marrero (Serbia) N Zimonjić	5	6	[4]
4	(United Kingdom) D Inglot (Romania) F Mergea	3	7^{7}	[7]
(France) J Chardy (France) F Martin	6	6^{5}	[10]
PR	(Netherlands) R Haase (Germany) P Petzschner	3	3
3	(Canada) V Pospisil (Czech Republic) R Štěpánek	6	6
(Argentina) F Bagnis (Czech Republic) J Veselý	5	6^{4}
(Spain) N Almagro (Spain) F Verdasco	7	7^{7}

Semifinals
1	(United Kingdom) J Murray (Brazil) B Soares	6^{3}	6^{6}
(France) J Chardy (France) F Martin	7^{7}	7^{8}
3	(Canada) V Pospisil (Czech Republic) R Štěpánek	w/o
(Spain) N Almagro (Spain) F Verdasco

Final
(France) J Chardy (France) F Martin	6	7^{7}
3	(Canada) V Pospisil (Czech Republic) R Štěpánek	4	6^{3}
