= 2003 Grand Prix de Tennis de Lyon =

- Date: 6–12 October 2003
- Edition: 17th
- Category: International Series
- Draw: 32S / 16D
- Prize money: $775,000
- Surface: Carpet / indoor
- Location: Lyon, France
- Venue: Palais des Sports de Gerland

Champions

Singles
- (Germany) Rainer Schüttler

Doubles
- (Israel) Jonathan Erlich / (Israel) Andy Ram
← 2002 ·	Grand Prix de Tennis de Lyon	· 2004 →

The 2003 Grand Prix de Tennis de Lyon was a men's tennis tournament played on indoor carpet courts at the Palais des Sports de Gerland in Lyon, France, and was part of the International Series of the 2003 ATP Tour. It was the 17th edition of the tournament and was held from 6 October until 12 October 2003. First-seeded Rainer Schüttler won the singles title.

== Finals ==
=== Singles ===
(Germany) Rainer Schüttler defeated (France) Arnaud Clément 7–5, 6–3

- It was Schüttler's 2nd singles title of the year and the 4th of his career.

=== Doubles ===
(Israel) Jonathan Erlich / (Israel) Andy Ram defeated (France) Julien Benneteau / (France) Nicolas Mahut 6–1, 6–3

- It was Erlich's 2nd title of the year and the 3rd of his career. It was Ram's 3rd title of the year and the 3rd of his career.
