= 2004 Grand Prix de Tennis de Lyon =

- Date: 4–11 October 2004
- Edition: 18th
- Category: International Series
- Draw: 32S / 16D
- Prize money: $767,000
- Surface: Carpet / indoor
- Location: Lyon, France

Champions

Singles
- (Sweden) Robin Söderling

Doubles
- (Israel) Jonathan Erlich / (Israel) Andy Ram
← 2003 ·	Grand Prix de Tennis de Lyon	· 2005 →

The 2004 Grand Prix de Tennis de Lyon was a men's tennis tournament played on indoor carpet courts. It was played at the Palais des Sports de Gerland in Lyon, France, and was part of the 2004 ATP Tour. It was the 18th edition of the tournament and took place from 4 October through 11 October 2004. Unseeded Robin Söderling won the singles title.

== Finals ==
=== Singles ===
(Sweden) Robin Söderling defeated (Belgium) Xavier Malisse 6–2, 3–6, 6–4

- It was Söderling's only title of the year and the 1st of his career.

=== Doubles ===
(Israel) Jonathan Erlich / (Israel) Andy Ram defeated (Sweden) Jonas Björkman / (Czech Republic) Radek Štěpánek 7–6^{(7–2)}, 6–2

- It was Erlich's only title of the year and the 4th of his career. It was Ram's only title of the year and the 4th of his career.
