= Richard Gasquet career statistics =

Career finals
Discipline	Type	Won	Lost	Total	WR
Singles	Grand Slam tournaments	–	–	–	–
Singles	Year-end championships	–	–	–	–
Singles	ATP Masters 1000*	–	3	3	0.00
Singles	Olympic Games	–	–	–	–
Singles	ATP Tour 500	–	2	2	0.00
Singles	ATP Tour 250	16	12	28	0.56
Singles	Total	16	17	33	0.48
Doubles	Grand Slam tournaments	–	–	–	–
Doubles	Year-end championships	–	–	–	–
Doubles	ATP Masters 1000*	–	1	1	0.00
Doubles	Olympic Games	–	–	–	–
Doubles	ATP Tour 500	–	–	–	–
Doubles	ATP Tour 250	2	1	3	0.67
Doubles	Total	2	2	4	0.50
Mixed doubles	Grand Slam tournaments	1	0	1	1.00
Mixed doubles	Total	1	0	1	1.00
Mixed doubles	Total	19	19	38	0.50
Mixed doubles	1) WR = Winning Rate; 2) * formerly known as "Super 9" (1996–1999), "Tennis Masters Series" (2000–2003) or "ATP Masters Series" (2004–2008).				

This page is a list of the main career statistics of French tennis player, Richard Gasquet. To date, he has won 16 ATP singles titles. He was also the runner-up at the 2005 Hamburg Masters and Canada Masters in 2006 and 2012, a semifinalist at the 2007 and 2015 Wimbledon Championships and 2013 US Open and a bronze medallist in men's doubles with Julien Benneteau at the 2012 London Olympics. On 9 July 2007, Gasquet achieved a career high singles ranking of world No. 7.

== Significant finals ==
=== Grand Slam tournaments ===
==== Mixed doubles: 1 (1 title) ====
Result	Year	Championship	Surface	Partner	Opponents	Score
Win	2004	French Open	Clay	(France) Tatiana Golovin	(Zimbabwe) Cara Black (Zimbabwe) Wayne Black	6–3, 6–4

=== Olympic Games ===
==== Doubles: 1 (1 bronze medal) ====
Result	Year	Championship	Surface	Partner	Opponents	Score
Bronze	2012	London Olympics	Grass	(France) Julien Benneteau	(Spain) David Ferrer (Spain) Feliciano López	7–6^{(7–4)}, 6–2

=== Masters 1000 tournaments ===
==== Singles: 3 (3 runners-up) ====
Result	Year	Championship	Surface	Opponent	Score
Loss	2005	Hamburg	Clay	(Switzerland) Roger Federer	3–6, 5–7, 6–7^{(4–7)}
Loss	2006	Toronto	Hard	(Switzerland) Roger Federer	6–2, 3–6, 2–6
Loss	2012	Toronto (2)	Hard	(Serbia) Novak Djokovic	3–6, 2–6

==== Doubles: 1 (1 runner-up) ====
Result	Year	Championship	Surface	Partner	Opponents	Score
Loss	2007	Monte Carlo	Clay	(France) Julien Benneteau	(United States) Bob Bryan (United States) Mike Bryan	2–6, 1–6

== ATP Tour finals ==
=== Singles: 33 (16 titles, 17 runners-up) ===
Legend Grand Slam tournaments (0–0) ATP World Tour Finals (0–0) ATP World Tour Masters 1000 (0–3) ATP World Tour 500 Series (0–2) ATP World Tour 250 Series (16–12)	Finals by surface Hard (9–9) Clay (3–7) Grass (3–1) Carpet (1–0)	Finals by setting Outdoor (9–13) Indoor (7–4)

Result	W–L	Date	Tournament	Tier	Surface	Opponent	Score
Loss	0–1	Oct 2004	Open de Moselle, France	International	Hard (i)	(France) Jérôme Haehnel	6–7^{(9–11)}, 4–6
Loss	0–2	May 2005	German Open, Germany	Masters	Clay	(Switzerland) Roger Federer	3–6, 5–7, 6–7^{(4–7)}
Win	1–2	Jun 2005	Nottingham Open, U.K.	International	Grass	(Belarus) Max Mirnyi	6–2, 6–3
Win	2–2	Jun 2006	Nottingham Open, U.K. (2)	International	Grass	(Sweden) Jonas Björkman	6–4, 6–3
Win	3–2	Jul 2006	Swiss Open, Switzerland	International	Clay	(Spain) Feliciano López	7–6^{(7–4)}, 6–7^{(3–7)}, 6–3, 6–3
Loss	3–3	Aug 2006	Canadian Open, Canada	Masters	Hard	(Switzerland) Roger Federer	6–2, 3–6, 2–6
Win	4–3	Oct 2006	Open Sud de France, France	International	Carpet (i)	(France) Marc Gicquel	6–3, 6–1
Loss	4–4	May 2007	Portugal Open, Portugal	International	Clay	(Serbia) Novak Djokovic	6–7^{(7–9)}, 6–0, 1–6
Win	5–4	Sep 2007	ATP Mumbai, India	International	Hard	(Belgium) Olivier Rochus	6–3, 6–4
Loss	5–5	Oct 2007	Japan Open, Japan	Intl. Gold	Hard	(Spain) David Ferrer	1–6, 2–6
Loss	5–6	Jul 2008	Stuttgart Open, Germany	Intl. Gold	Clay	(Argentina) Juan Martín del Potro	4–6, 5–7
Loss	5–7	Jan 2010	Sydney International, Australia	250 Series	Hard	(Cyprus) Marcos Baghdatis	4–6, 6–7^{(2–7)}
Win	6–7	May 2010	Open de Nice Côte d'Azur, France	250 Series	Clay	(Spain) Fernando Verdasco	6–3, 5–7, 7–6^{(7–5)}
Loss	6–8	Aug 2010	Swiss Open, Switzerland	250 Series	Clay	(Spain) Nicolás Almagro	5–7, 1–6
Loss	6–9	May 2012	Portugal Open, Portugal	250 Series	Clay	(Argentina) Juan Martín del Potro	4–6, 2–6
Loss	6–10	Aug 2012	Canadian Open, Canada	Masters 1000	Hard	(Serbia) Novak Djokovic	3–6, 2–6
Win	7–10	Sep 2012	Thailand Open, Thailand	250 Series	Hard (i)	(France) Gilles Simon	6–2, 6–1
Win	8–10	Jan 2013	Qatar Open, Qatar	250 Series	Hard	(Russia) Nikolay Davydenko	3–6, 7–6^{(7–4)}, 6–3
Win	9–10	Feb 2013	Open Sud de France, France (2)	250 Series	Hard (i)	(France) Benoît Paire	6–2, 6–3
Win	10–10	Oct 2013	Kremlin Cup, Russia	250 Series	Hard (i)	(Kazakhstan) Mikhail Kukushkin	4–6, 6–4, 6–4
Loss	10–11	Feb 2014	Open Sud de France, France	250 Series	Hard (i)	(France) Gaël Monfils	4–6, 4–6
Loss	10–12	Jun 2014	Eastbourne International, U.K.	250 Series	Grass	(Spain) Feliciano López	3–6, 7–6^{(7–5)}, 5–7
Win	11–12	Feb 2015	Open Sud de France, France (3)	250 Series	Hard (i)	(Poland) Jerzy Janowicz	3–0 ret.
Win	12–12	May 2015	Portugal Open, Portugal	250 Series	Clay	(Australia) Nick Kyrgios	6–3, 6–2
Win	13–12	Feb 2016	Open Sud de France, France (4)	250 Series	Hard (i)	(France) Paul-Henri Mathieu	7–5, 6–4
Loss	13–13	Oct 2016	Shenzhen Open, China	250 Series	Hard	(Czech Republic) Tomáš Berdych	6–7^{(5–7)}, 7–6^{(7–2)}, 3–6
Win	14–13	Oct 2016	European Open, Belgium	250 Series	Hard (i)	(Argentina) Diego Schwartzman	7–6^{(7–4)}, 6–1
Loss	14–14	Feb 2017	Open Sud de France, France	250 Series	Hard (i)	(Germany) Alexander Zverev	6–7^{(4–7)}, 3–6
Loss	14–15	Feb 2018	Open Sud de France, France	250 Series	Hard (i)	(France) Lucas Pouille	6–7^{(2–7)}, 4–6
Win	15–15	Jun 2018	Rosmalen Championships, Netherlands	250 Series	Grass	(France) Jérémy Chardy	6–3, 7–6^{(7–5)}
Loss	15–16	Jul 2018	Swedish Open, Sweden	250 Series	Clay	(Italy) Fabio Fognini	3–6, 6–3, 1–6
Loss	15–17	Jul 2021	Croatia Open, Croatia	250 Series	Clay	(Spain) Carlos Alcaraz	2–6, 2–6
Win	16–17	Jan 2023	Auckland Open, New Zealand	250 Series	Hard	(United Kingdom) Cameron Norrie	4–6, 6–4, 6–4

=== Doubles: 4 (2 titles, 2 runners-up) ===
Legend Grand Slam tournaments (0–0) ATP World Tour Finals (0–0) ATP World Tour Masters 1000 (0–1) ATP World Tour 500 Series (0–0) ATP World Tour 250 Series (2–1)	Finals by surface Hard (2–1) Clay (0–1) Grass (0–0)	Finals by setting Outdoor (1–1) Indoor (1–1)

Result	W–L	Date	Tournament	Tier	Surface	Partner	Opponents	Score
Win	1–0	Oct 2006	Moselle Open, France	International	Hard (i)	(France) Fabrice Santoro	(Austria) Julian Knowle (Austria) Jürgen Melzer	3–6, 6–1, [11–9]
Loss	1–1	Apr 2007	Monte-Carlo Masters, France	Masters	Clay	(France) Julien Benneteau	(United States) Bob Bryan (United States) Mike Bryan	2–6, 1–6
Win	2–1	Jan 2008	Sydney International, Australia	International	Hard	(France) Jo-Wilfried Tsonga	(United States) Bob Bryan (United States) Mike Bryan	4–6, 6–4, [11–9]
Loss	2–2	Nov 2009	St. Petersburg Open, Russia	250 Series	Hard (i)	(France) Jérémy Chardy	(United Kingdom) Colin Fleming (United Kingdom) Ken Skupski	6–2, 5–7, [4–10]

== National representation ==
=== Team competition finals: 5 (2 titles, 3 runners-up) ===
Legend
Olympic Games (0–0)
Davis Cup (1–2)
Hopman Cup (1–1)

Outcome	Date	Team competition	Surface	Partner/team	Opponents	Score
Runner–up	2–7 January 2012	Hopman Cup, Perth, Australia	Hard	(France) Marion Bartoli	(Czech Republic) Petra Kvitová (Czech Republic) Tomáš Berdych	2–0
Runner–up	21–23 November 2014	Davis Cup, Lille, France	Clay (i)	(France) Jo-Wilfried Tsonga (France) Gaël Monfils (France) Julien Benneteau (France) Michaël Llodra	(Switzerland) Roger Federer (Switzerland) Stan Wawrinka (Switzerland) Marco Chiudinelli (Switzerland) Michael Lammer	1–3
Winner	1–7 January 2017	Hopman Cup, Perth	Hard	(France) Kristina Mladenovic	(United States) Jack Sock (United States) CoCo Vandeweghe	2–1
Winner	24–26 November 2017	Davis Cup, Villeneuve-d'Ascq, France	Hard (i)	(France) Jo-Wilfried Tsonga (France) Lucas Pouille (France) Pierre-Hugues Herbert (France) Nicolas Mahut (France) Julien Benneteau (France) Jérémy Chardy (France) Gilles Simon	(Belgium) David Goffin (Belgium) Steve Darcis (Belgium) Ruben Bemelmans (Belgium) Joris De Loore (Belgium) Arthur De Greef	3–2
Runner–up	23–25 November 2018	Davis Cup, Lille, France	Clay (i)	(France) Jo-Wilfried Tsonga (France) Lucas Pouille (France) Jérémy Chardy (France) Nicolas Mahut (France) Pierre-Hugues Herbert (France) Benoît Paire (France) Julien Benneteau (France) Adrian Mannarino	(Croatia) Marin Čilić (Croatia) Borna Ćorić (Croatia) Mate Pavić (Croatia) Ivan Dodig (Croatia) Nikola Mektić (Croatia) Viktor Galović	1–3

== Exhibition Finals ==
Result	Date	Tournament	Surface	Opponent	Score
Loss	Oct 2020	Ultimate Tennis Showdown, Antwerp, Belgium	Hard (i)	(Australia) Alex de Minaur	9–24, 14–15, 10–20

== Singles performance timeline ==
Key
W	F	SF	QF	#R	RR	Q#	P#	DNQ	A	Z#	PO	G	S	B	NMS	NTI	P	NH

(W) winner; (F) finalist; (SF) semifinalist; (QF) quarterfinalist; (#R) rounds 4, 3, 2, 1; (RR) round-robin stage; (Q#) qualification round; (P#) preliminary round; (DNQ) did not qualify; (A) absent; (Z#) Davis/Fed Cup Zonal Group (with number indication) or (PO) play-off; (G) gold, (S) silver or (B) bronze Olympic/Paralympic medal; (NMS) not a Masters tournament; (NTI) not a Tier I tournament; (P) postponed; (NH) not held; (SR) strike rate (events won / competed); (W–L) win–loss record.
To avoid confusion and double counting, these charts are updated at the conclusion of a tournament or when the player's participation has ended.

Tournament	2002	2003	2004	2005	2006	2007	2008	2009	2010	2011	2012	2013	2014	2015	2016	2017	2018	2019	2020	2021	2022	2023	2024	2025	SR	W–L	Win%
Grand Slam tournaments
Australian Open	A	1R	1R	A	1R	4R	4R	3R	1R	3R	4R	4R	3R	3R	A	3R	3R	A	A	A	2R	1R	1R	Q1	0 / 17	25–17	60%
French Open	1R	1R	1R	3R	2R	2R	A	A	1R	4R	4R	4R	3R	4R	QF	3R	3R	2R	1R	2R	2R	1R	2R	2R	0 / 22	31–22	58%
Wimbledon	A	A	1R	4R	1R	SF	4R	A	A	4R	4R	3R	2R	SF	4R	1R	1R	1R	NH	2R	3R	1R	Q3	A	0 / 17	31–17	65%
US Open	Q2	A	Q1	4R	4R	2R	1R	1R	4R	2R	4R	SF	3R	QF	1R	1R	3R	1R	2R	1R	3R	1R	Q2	A	0 / 19	30–18	63%
Win–loss	0–1	0–2	0–3	8–3	4–4	10–3	6–3	2–2	3–3	9–4	12–4	13–4	7–4	14–4	7–3	4–4	6–4	1–3	1–2	2–3	6–4	0–4	1–2	1–1	0 / 75	117–74	61%
Year-end championship
ATP Finals	did not qualify					RR	did not qualify					RR	did not qualify												0 / 2	1–5	17%
ATP World Tour Masters 1000
Indian Wells Open	A	A	A	A	4R	4R	4R	3R	1R	QF	2R	4R	3R	2R	4R	A	A	A	NH	A	1R	2R	A	A	0 / 13	16–13	55%
Miami Open	A	1R	A	A	2R	3R	2R	A	1R	3R	4R	SF	4R	A	4R	A	2R	A	NH	A	1R	1R	A	A	0 / 13	13–12	52%
Monte-Carlo Masters	2R	1R	A	SF	A	QF	3R	A	2R	3R	A	QF	A	A	2R	A	QF	A	NH	A	A	2R	A	2R	0 / 12	19–12	61%
Madrid Open^{1}	A	A	A	F	1R	2R	2R	A	A	1R	3R	2R	A	2R	3R	A	2R	2R	NH	A	A	2R	1R	A	0 / 13	14–13	52%
Italian Open	A	A	A	2R	A	2R	1R	3R	A	SF	QF	3R	A	2R	3R	A	1R	1R	A	1R	A	1R	Q2	A	0 / 13	16–13	55%
Canadian Open	A	A	A	2R	F	2R	QF	A	1R	3R	F	QF	3R	A	A	2R	A	3R	NH	A	A	A	A	A	0 / 11	22–10	69%
Cincinnati Open	A	A	A	2R	1R	2R	2R	A	3R	3R	1R	2R	A	QF	2R	2R	1R	SF	2R	1R	A	1R	A	A	0 / 16	16–16	50%
Shanghai Masters^{2}	A	A	A	A	2R	2R	3R	1R	3R	A	2R	1R	2R	3R	1R	QF	2R	1R	NH			1R	A	A	0 / 14	12–14	46%
Paris Masters	Q1	1R	Q1	A	3R	SF	A	A	2R	3R	2R	QF	2R	QF	3R	2R	2R	A	2R	1R	2R	1R	1R	A	0 / 17	16–16	50%
Win–loss	1–1	0–3	0–0	12–5	9–6	11–9	8–8	3–3	6–7	15–8	12–8	14–9	7–4	9–6	11–8	6–4	6–7	7–5	1–2	0–3	1–3	3–7	0–2	1–1	0 / 122	144–119	55%
Career statistics
	2002	2003	2004	2005	2006	2007	2008	2009	2010	2011	2012	2013	2014	2015	2016	2017	2018	2019	2020	2021	2022	2023	2024	2025	Career		
Tournaments	5	8	15	11	23	24	21	15	25	18	23	24	19	19	19	18	24	18	10	17	19	26	14	4	419		
Titles–finals	0–0	0–0	0–1	1–2	3–4	1–3	0–1	0–0	1–3	0–0	1–3	3–3	0–2	2–2	2–3	0–1	1–3	0–0	0–0	0–1	0–0	1–1	0–0	0–0	16–33		
Hardcourt win–loss	0–0	2–5	4–4	7–4	14–12	29–13	18–13	19–13	20–14	19–12	27–15	39–16	23–14	27–12	22–12	20–12	18–14	8–8	10–9	4–8	15–11	10–12	2–8	1–2	9 / 250	358–243	60%
Clay win–loss	1–3	0–2	9–9	13–5	7–4	12–7	7–5	3–2	16–8	12–7	11–4	7–4	4–2	10–3	10–4	3–3	13–7	5–6	0–1	9–7	9–7	2–8	2–5	2–2	3 / 117	167–116	59%
Grass win–loss	0–1	0–0	0–2	11–2	6–2	7–3	6–3	0–0	2–0	3–1	4–3	4–2	4–3	6–2	3–2	6–3	4–2	4–3	0–0	1–1	2–1	2–4	0–1	0–0	3 / 45	75–41	65%
Carpet win–loss	0–1	0–1	0–0	0–0	7–3	1–1	1–1	Discontinued																	1 / 7	9–7	56%
Overall win–loss	1–5	2–8	13–15	31–11	34–21	49–24	32–22	22–15	38–22	34–20	42–22	50–23	31–19	43–17	35–18	29–18	35–23	17–17	10–10	14–16	26–19	14–24	4–14	4–5	16 / 419	610–408	60%
Win %	17%	20%	46%	74%	62%	67%	59%	59%	63%	63%	66%	68%	62%	72%	66%	62%	60%	50%	50%	47%	58%	37%	22%	43%	60%		
Year-end ranking	161	93	107	16	18	8	25	52	30	19	10	9	26	9	18	31	26	61	47	86	68	76	129		$21,338,168		

^{1}Held as Hamburg Masters until 2008, Madrid Masters (clay) 2009–present.
^{2}Held as Madrid Masters (hardcourt) until 2008, and Shanghai Masters 2009–present.

*Gasquet withdrew from the 2007 US Open due to illness, having won his opening round.

== Top 10 wins ==
- He has a 36–117 win-loss record against players who were, at the time the match was played, ranked in the top 10.

Season	2002	2003	2004	2005	2006	2007	2008	2009	2010	2011	2012	2013	2014	2015	2016	2017	2018	2019	2020	2021	2022	2023	2024	2025	Total
Wins	0	0	0	1	1	5	1	3	2	4	3	3	1	4	1	1	2	1	0	1	1	1	0	0	36

#	Player	Rank	Event	Surface	Rd	Score
2005
1.	(Switzerland) Roger Federer	1	Monte-Carlo Masters, France	Clay	QF	6–7^{(1–7)}, 6–2, 7–6^{(10–8)}
2006
2.	(United States) James Blake	6	Canadian Open, Canada	Hard	2R	6–4, 6–3
2007
3.	(Croatia) Ivan Ljubičić	8	Monte-Carlo Masters, France	Clay	3R	6–3, 6–7^{(5–7)}, 7–5
4.	(United States) Andy Roddick	3	Wimbledon, UK	Grass	QF	4–6, 4–6, 7–6^{(7–2)}, 7–6^{(7–3)}, 8–6
5.	(Czech Republic) Tomáš Berdych	10	Japan Open, Japan	Hard	SF	7–6^{(7–3)}, 6–3
6.	(United States) James Blake	7	Paris Masters, France	Hard (i)	3R	6–4, 6–4
7.	(Serbia) Novak Djokovic	3	Tennis Masters Cup, China	Hard (i)	RR	6–4, 6–2
2008
8.	(Spain) David Ferrer	5	Canadian Open, Canada	Hard	3R	6–3, 6–3
2009
9.	(France) Jo-Wilfried Tsonga	7	Brisbane International, Australia	Hard	QF	1–6, 6–4, 6–2
10.	(France) Gilles Simon	7	Sydney International, Australia	Hard	2R	6–4, 6–4
11.	(France) Jo-Wilfried Tsonga	10	Italian Open, Italy	Clay	1R	7–6^{(7–2)}, 6–4
2010
12.	(Spain) Fernando Verdasco	9	Open de Nice Côte d'Azur, France	Clay	F	6–3, 5–7, 7–6^{(7–5)}
13.	(Russia) Nikolay Davydenko	6	US Open, US	Hard	2R	6–3, 6–4, 6–2
2011
14.	(Austria) Jürgen Melzer	10	Indian Wells Open, United States	Hard	3R	6–1, 6–3
15.	(United States) Andy Roddick	8	Indian Wells Open, United States	Hard	4R	6–3, 7–6^{(7–5)}
16.	(Switzerland) Roger Federer	3	Italian Open, Italy	Clay	3R	4–6, 7–6^{(7–2)}, 7–6^{(7–4)}
17.	(Czech Republic) Tomáš Berdych	7	RItalian Open, Italy	Clay	QF	4–6, 6–2, 6–4
2012
18.	(Serbia) Janko Tipsarević	9	Australian Open, Australia	Hard	3R	6–3, 6–3, 6–1
19.	(United Kingdom) Andy Murray	4	Italian Open, Italy	Clay	3R	6–7^{(1–7)}, 6–3, 6–2
20.	(Czech Republic) Tomáš Berdych	7	Canadian Open, Canada	Hard	3R	6–4, 6–2
2013
21.	(Czech Republic) Tomáš Berdych	6	Miami Open, United States	Hard	QF	6–3, 6–3
22.	(Spain) David Ferrer	4	US Open, US	Hard	QF	6–3, 6–1, 4–6, 2–6, 6–3
23.	(Spain) David Ferrer	4	China Open, China	Hard	QF	6–3, 6–4
2014
24.	(Czech Republic) Tomáš Berdych	6	Davis Cup, France	Clay	SF	6–3, 6–2, 6–3
2015
25.	(Switzerland) Stanislas Wawrinka	4	Wimbledon, UK	Grass	QF	6–4, 4–6, 3–6, 6–4, 11–9
26.	(Croatia) Marin Čilić	9	Cincinnati Open, United States	Hard	3R	7–5, 6–3
27.	(Czech Republic) Tomáš Berdych	6	US Open, US	Hard	4R	2–6, 6–3, 6–4, 6–1
28.	(Japan) Kei Nishikori	7	Paris Masters, France	Hard	3R	7–6^{(7–3)}, 4–1 Ret.
2016
29.	(Japan) Kei Nishikori	6	French Open, France	Clay	4R	6–4, 6–2, 4–6, 6–2
2017
30.	(Austria) Dominic Thiem	6	Vienna Open, Austria	Hard (i)	2R	4–6, 7–5, 6–1
2018
31.	(Belgium) David Goffin	7	Open Sud de France, France	Hard (i)	SF	6–4, 0–6, 6–3
32.	(South Africa) Kevin Anderson	9	Japan Open, Japan	Hard (i)	QF	7–6^{(8–6)}, 7–6^{(7–4)}
2019
33.	(Japan) Kei Nishikori	6	Canadian Open, Canada	Hard	2R	6–7^{(6–8)}, 6–2, 7–6^{(7–4)}
2021
34.	(Argentina) Diego Schwartzman	10	Lyon Open, France	Clay	2R	6–3, 7–5
2022
35.	Daniil Medvedev	2	Geneva Open, Switzerland	Clay	2R	6–2, 7–6^{(7–5)}
2023
36.	(Greece) Stefanos Tsitsipas	5	Stuttgart Open, Germany	Grass	2R	7–6^{(10–8)}, 2–6, 7–5

== ATP career earnings ==
Year	Majors	ATP titles	Total titles	Earnings ($)	Money list rank
2002	0	0	0	$62,085	214
2003	0	0	0	$112,721	155
2004	0	0	0	$170,505	131
2005	0	1	1	$653,373	30
2006	0	3	3	$770,310	22
2007	0	1	1	$1,284,790	8
2008	0	0	0	$750,949	34
2009	0	0	0	$430,935	69
2010	0	1	1	$657,596	42
2011	0	0	0	$903,174	29
2012	0	1	1	$1,562,677	10
2013	0	3	3	$2,411,899	9
2014	0	0	0	$1,884,460	16
2015	0	2	2	$2,521,835	9
2016	0	2	2	$1,325,660	16
2017	0	0	0	$1,030,188	n/a
2018	0	1	1	$1,381,694	n/a
2019	0	0	0	$903,012	64
2020	0	0	0	$396,616	88
2021	0	0	0	$519,521	102
2022	0	0	0	$814,218	75
2023	0	1	1	$825,205	89
2024	0	0	0	$119,323	98
Career	0	16	16	$20,800,344	27

* Statistics correct as of 19 February 2024.
