= 2004 Grand Prix de Tennis de Lyon – Doubles =

Doubles
- 2004 Grand Prix de Tennis de Lyon

Final
- Champions: (Israel) Jonathan Erlich (Israel) Andy Ram
- Runners-up: (Sweden) Jonas Björkman (Czech Republic) Radek Štěpánek
- Score: 7–6^{(7–2)}, 6–2

Details
- Draw: 16
- Seeds: 4

Events
Singles	Doubles
← 2003 ·	Grand Prix de Tennis de Lyon	· 2005 →

Jonathan Erlich and Andy Ram were the defending champions and successfully defended their title, defeating Jonas Björkman and Radek Štěpánek 7–6^{(7–2)}, 6–2 in the final.

== Seeds ==
1. (India) Mahesh Bhupathi / (Belarus) Max Mirnyi (semifinals)
2. (Zimbabwe) Wayne Black / (Zimbabwe) Kevin Ullyett (quarterfinals)
3. (Austria) Julian Knowle / (France) Michaël Llodra (first round)
4. (Argentina) Gastón Etlis / (Argentina) Martín Rodríguez (first round)

== Draw ==
=== Key ===
- Q = Qualifier
- WC = Wild card
- LL = Lucky loser
- Alt = Alternate
- SE = Special exempt
- PR = Protected ranking
- ITF = ITF entry
- JE = Junior exempt
- w/o = Walkover
- r = Retired
- d = Defaulted
- SR = Special ranking

=== Draw ===
First round
1	(India) M Bhupathi (Belarus) M Mirnyi	6	6
(Belgium) X Malisse (United States) V Spadea	3	4
(Germany) R Schüttler (Russia) M Youzhny	6^{5}	6^{4}
(Slovakia) D Hrbatý (Sweden) T Johansson	7^{7}	7^{7}
4	(Argentina) G Etlis (Argentina) M Rodríguez	5	5
(Israel) J Erlich (Israel) A Ram	7	7
WC	(France) P-H Mathieu (France) G Monfils	3	3
WC	(France) J Benneteau (France) N Mahut	6	6
(Argentina) L Arnold (Chile) N Massú	6	6
(Argentina) M Hood (Croatia) I Ljubičić	2	4
(Czech Republic) F Čermák (Czech Republic) L Friedl	3	6	7^{7}
3	(Austria) J Knowle (France) M Llodra	6	2	6^{2}
Alt	(Spain) F López (Armenia) S Sargsian	6	3	2
(Sweden) J Björkman (Czech Republic) R Štěpánek	4	6	6
(Czech Republic) M Damm (Czech Republic) C Suk	5	7	5
2	(Zimbabwe) W Black (Zimbabwe) K Ullyett	7	5	7

Quarterfinals
1	(India) M Bhupathi (Belarus) M Mirnyi	4	6	6
(Slovakia) D Hrbatý (Sweden) T Johansson	6	4	3
(Israel) J Erlich (Israel) A Ram	w/o
WC	(France) J Benneteau (France) N Mahut
(Argentina) L Arnold (Chile) N Massú	4	6^{4}
(Czech Republic) F Čermák (Czech Republic) L Friedl	6	7^{7}
(Sweden) J Björkman (Czech Republic) R Štěpánek	7^{9}	6
2	(Zimbabwe) W Black (Zimbabwe) K Ullyett	6^{7}	4

Semifinals
1	(India) M Bhupathi (Belarus) M Mirnyi	7^{7}	3	4
(Israel) J Erlich (Israel) A Ram	6^{3}	6	6
(Czech Republic) F Čermák (Czech Republic) L Friedl	6	6^{3}	4
(Sweden) J Björkman (Czech Republic) R Štěpánek	4	7^{7}	6

Final
(Israel) J Erlich (Israel) A Ram	7^{7}	6
(Sweden) J Björkman (Czech Republic) R Štěpánek	6^{2}	2
