= 2003 Grand Prix de Tennis de Lyon – Doubles =

Doubles
- 2003 Grand Prix de Tennis de Lyon

Final
- Champions: (Israel) Jonathan Erlich (Israel) Andy Ram
- Runners-up: (France) Julien Benneteau (France) Nicolas Mahut
- Score: 6–1, 6–3

Details
- Draw: 16
- Seeds: 4

Events
| Singles | Doubles |
| ← 2002 · | Grand Prix de Tennis de Lyon | · 2004 → |

Wayne Black and Kevin Ullyett were the defending champions but lost in the first round to Arnaud Clément and Sébastien Grosjean.

Jonathan Erlich and Andy Ram won in the final 6–1, 6–3 against Julien Benneteau and Nicolas Mahut.

== Seeds ==
1. (The Bahamas) Mark Knowles / (Canada) Daniel Nestor (first round)
2. (France) Michaël Llodra / (France) Fabrice Santoro (semifinals)
3. (Argentina) Gastón Etlis / (Argentina) Martín Rodríguez (quarterfinals)
4. (Zimbabwe) Wayne Black / (Zimbabwe) Kevin Ullyett (first round)

== Draw ==
=== Key ===
- Q = Qualifier
- WC = Wild card
- LL = Lucky loser
- Alt = Alternate
- SE = Special exempt
- PR = Protected ranking
- ITF = ITF entry
- JE = Junior exempt
- w/o = Walkover
- r = Retired
- d = Defaulted
- SR = Special ranking

First round
1 | (The Bahamas) M Knowles (Canada) D Nestor | 6 | 1 | 4
(South Africa) R Koenig (Argentina) S Prieto | 4 | 6 | 6
(Russia) A Olhovskiy (Russia) M Safin | 3 | 6^{6}
(Germany) R Schüttler (Russia) M Youzhny | 6 | 7^{8}
3 | (Argentina) G Etlis (Argentina) M Rodríguez | 7^{7} | 6
(Belgium) O Rochus (United States) J Thomas | 6^{4} | 4
(Czech Republic) T Cibulec (Czech Republic) P Vízner | 3 | 6^{8}
(Israel) J Erlich (Israel) A Ram | 6 | 7^{10}
(Russia) Y Kafelnikov (Czech Republic) R Štěpánek
WC | (France) J Benneteau (France) N Mahut | w/o
(France) A Clément (France) S Grosjean | 7 | 6
4 | (Zimbabwe) W Black (Zimbabwe) K Ullyett | 5 | 2
(Sweden) S Aspelin (Italy) M Bertolini | 6 | 7
(United States) M Fish (United States) R Ginepri | 4 | 5
WC | (France) T Ascione (Spain) R Nadal | 2 | 6^{3}
2 | (France) M Llodra (France) F Santoro | 6 | 7^{7}

Quarterfinals
(South Africa) R Koenig (Argentina) S Prieto | 0 | 5
(Germany) R Schüttler (Russia) M Youzhny | 6 | 7
3 | (Argentina) G Etlis (Argentina) M Rodríguez | 4 | 7 | 2
(Israel) J Erlich (Israel) A Ram | 6 | 5 | 6
WC | (France) J Benneteau (France) N Mahut | w/o
(France) A Clément (France) S Grosjean
(Sweden) S Aspelin (Italy) M Bertolini | 6 | 3 | 4
2 | (France) M Llodra (France) F Santoro | 4 | 6 | 6

Semifinals
(Germany) R Schüttler (Russia) M Youzhny | 4 | 6 | 1
(Israel) J Erlich (Israel) A Ram | 6 | 1 | 6
WC | (France) J Benneteau (France) N Mahut | 6 | 7
2 | (France) M Llodra (France) F Santoro | 4 | 5

Final
(Israel) J Erlich (Israel) A Ram | 6 | 6
WC | (France) J Benneteau (France) N Mahut | 1 | 3
