= 2003 Grand Prix de Tennis de Lyon – Singles =

Singles
- 2003 Grand Prix de Tennis de Lyon

Final
- Champion: (Germany) Rainer Schüttler
- Runner-up: (France) Arnaud Clément
- Score: 7–5, 6–3

Events
Singles	Doubles
← 2002 ·	Grand Prix de Tennis de Lyon	· 2004 →

Paul-Henri Mathieu was the defending champion but lost in the first round to Rainer Schüttler.

Schüttler won in the final 7–5, 6–3 against Arnaud Clément.

== Seeds ==
1. (Germany) Rainer Schüttler (champion)
2. (France) Sébastien Grosjean (first round)
3. (Thailand) Paradorn Srichaphan (semifinals)
4. (Spain) Félix Mantilla (first round)
5. (United States) Mardy Fish (first round)
6. (South Africa) Wayne Ferreira (first round)
7. (Russia) Marat Safin (first round)
8. (Russia) Yevgeny Kafelnikov (first round)

== Draw ==
=== Key ===
- Q = Qualifier
- WC = Wild card
- LL = Lucky loser
- Alt = Alternate
- SE = Special exempt
- PR = Protected ranking
- ITF = ITF entry
- JE = Junior exempt
- w/o = Walkover
- r = Retired
- d = Defaulted
- SR = Special ranking

=== Finals ===
Semifinals
1	(Germany) Rainer Schüttler	6	3	7
(Russia) Mikhail Youzhny	3	6	5
3	(Thailand) Paradorn Srichaphan	2	3
(France) Arnaud Clément	6	6

Final
1	(Germany) Rainer Schüttler	7	6
(France) Arnaud Clément	5	3

=== Top half ===
First round
1	(Germany) R Schüttler	6	6
(France) P-H Mathieu	2	2
(Ecuador) N Lapentti	2	6^{3}
(Croatia) I Ljubičić	6	7^{7}
Q	(Belgium) X Malisse	5	6	6
SE	(Romania) A Pavel	7	3	4
Q	(Sweden) T Enqvist	7^{9}	7^{7}
6	(South Africa) W Ferreira	6^{7}	6^{3}
4	(Spain) F Mantilla	3	6^{2}
(Russia) M Youzhny	6	7^{7}
(Spain) R Nadal	3	5
(Slovakia) D Hrbatý	6	7
(Netherlands) R Sluiter	6^{5}	3
(United States) R Ginepri	7^{7}	6
SE	(France) C Saulnier	7	6
5	(United States) M Fish	5	3

Second round
1	(Germany) R Schüttler	4	7^{7}	7
(Croatia) I Ljubičić	6	6^{2}	5
Q	(Belgium) X Malisse	6	6
Q	(Sweden) T Enqvist	3	4
(Russia) M Youzhny	1	7^{7}	6
(Slovakia) D Hrbatý	6	6^{1}	2
(United States) R Ginepri	4	6	6
SE	(France) C Saulnier	6	3	4

Quarterfinals
1	(Germany) R Schüttler	7^{7}	6
Q	(Belgium) X Malisse	6^{2}	4
(Russia) M Youzhny	7^{7}	6
(United States) R Ginepri	6^{3}	2

Semifinals
1	(Germany) R Schüttler	6	3	7
(Russia) M Youzhny	3	6	5

=== Bottom half ===
First round
7	(Russia) M Safin	1	4
(France) F Santoro	6	6
WC	(Spain) À Corretja	6^{3}	6^{5}
Q	(Switzerland) M Rosset	7^{7}	7^{7}
(Belgium) O Rochus	3	7^{7}	6
WC	(France) T Ascione	6	6^{4}	3
(Spain) D Sánchez	1	1
3	(Thailand) P Srichaphan	6	6
8	(Russia) Y Kafelnikov	2	3
(Spain) F Vicente	6	6
(France) A Clément	6	6
(Brazil) F Saretta	3	4
Q	(Morocco) H Arazi	6^{7}	7	7^{7}
(Czech Republic) R Štěpánek	7^{9}	5	6^{5}
WC	(France) N Mahut	4	6	r
2	(France) S Grosjean	6	3

Second round
(France) F Santoro	6	5	6
Q	(Switzerland) M Rosset	3	7	4
(Belgium) O Rochus	3	2
3	(Thailand) P Srichaphan	6	6
(Spain) F Vicente	1	4
(France) A Clément	6	6
Q	(Morocco) H Arazi	6	6
WC	(France) N Mahut	2	4

Quarterfinals
(France) F Santoro	6	3	6^{4}
3	(Thailand) P Srichaphan	1	6	7^{7}
(France) A Clément	6	6
Q	(Morocco) H Arazi	3	4

Semifinals
3	(Thailand) P Srichaphan	2	3
(France) A Clément	6	6
