= 2005 Idea Prokom Open – Doubles =

Doubles
- 2005 Idea Prokom Open

Final
- Champions: (Poland) Mariusz Fyrstenberg (Poland) Marcin Matkowski
- Runners-up: (Argentina) Lucas Arnold Ker (Argentina) Sebastián Prieto
- Score: 7–6^{(9–7)}, 6–4

Details
- Draw: 16 (2WC/2Alt)
- Seeds: 4

Events
Singles	Doubles
- Orange Warsaw Open

František Čermák and Leoš Friedl were the defending champions, but none competed this year.

Mariusz Fyrstenberg and Marcin Matkowski won the title by defeating Lucas Arnold Ker and Sebastián Prieto 7–6^{(9–7)}, 6–4 in the final.

== Seeds ==
1. (Argentina) Martín García / (Argentina) Mariano Hood (semifinals)
2. (Czech Republic) Petr Pála / (Czech Republic) Pavel Vízner (quarterfinals)
3. (Argentina) Lucas Arnold Ker / (Argentina) Sebastián Prieto (final)
4. (Poland) Mariusz Fyrstenberg / (Poland) Marcin Matkowski (champions)

== Draw ==
Key

- Q = Qualifier
- WC = Wild card
- LL = Lucky loser
- Alt = Alternate
- ITF = ITF entry
- PR = Protected ranking
- SR = Special ranking
- SE = Special exempt
- JE = Junior exempt
- JR = Junior Accelerator Programme entrant
- CO = College Accelerator Programme entrant
- NG = Next Gen Accelerator Program entrant
- w/o = Walkover
- r = Retired
- d = Defaulted

=== Draw ===
First round
1	(Argentina) M García (Argentina) M Hood	w/o
(Argentina) J Mónaco (Argentina) M Zabaleta
Alt	(Argentina) J Acasuso (Argentina) D Orsanic	6	6
(Sweden) R Lindstedt (Netherlands) R Wassen	4	3
3	(Argentina) L Arnold Ker (Argentina) S Prieto	6	6
WC	(Poland) M Diłaj (Poland) D Olejniczak	4	4
(Italy) A di Mauro (Italy) F Volandri	6	3	4
Alt	(Costa Rica) JA Marín (Spain) A Portas	2	6	6
(Spain) Ó Hernández (Spain) A Montañés	2	2
WC	(Poland) Ł Kubot (Poland) F Urban	6	6
(Germany) P Kohlschreiber (Czech Republic) J Levinský	0	3
4	(Poland) M Fyrstenberg (Poland) M Matkowski	6	6
(Italy) E Artoni (Czech Republic) D Škoch	2	5
(South Africa) J Coetzee (South Africa) C Haggard	6	7
(Czech Republic) T Cibulec (Belgium) T Vanhoudt	1	6^{3}
2	(Czech Republic) P Pála (Czech Republic) P Vízner	6	7^{7}

Quarterfinals
1	(Argentina) M García (Argentina) M Hood	7^{7}	6
Alt	(Argentina) J Acasuso (Argentina) D Orsanic	6^{4}	0
3	(Argentina) L Arnold Ker (Argentina) S Prieto	6	6
Alt	(Costa Rica) JA Marín (Spain) A Portas	4	4
WC	(Poland) Ł Kubot (Poland) F Urban	5	3
4	(Poland) M Fyrstenberg (Poland) M Matkowski	7	6
(South Africa) J Coetzee (South Africa) C Haggard	6	7
2	(Czech Republic) P Pála (Czech Republic) P Vízner	1	5

Semifinals
1	(Argentina) M García (Argentina) M Hood	4	6	6^{5}
3	(Argentina) L Arnold Ker (Argentina) S Prieto	6	3	7^{7}
4	(Poland) M Fyrstenberg (Poland) M Matkowski	6	3	7^{9}
(South Africa) J Coetzee (South Africa) C Haggard	2	6	6^{7}

Final
3	(Argentina) L Arnold Ker (Argentina) S Prieto	6^{7}	4
4	(Poland) M Fyrstenberg (Poland) M Matkowski	7^{9}	6
