= 2005 Idea Prokom Open – Singles =

Singles
- 2005 Idea Prokom Open

Final
- Champion: (France) Gaël Monfils
- Runner-up: (Germany) Florian Mayer
- Score: 7–6^{(8–6)}, 4–6, 7–5

Details
- Draw: 32
- Seeds: 8

Events
Singles	Doubles
- Idea Prokom Open

Rafael Nadal was the defending champion, but did not participate.

Unseeded Gaël Monfils won the title, defeating Florian Mayer 7–6^{(8–6)}, 4–6, 7–5 in the final.

== Seeds ==
1. (Argentina) Mariano Puerta (first round)
2. (Argentina) Gastón Gaudio (withdrew due to a shoulder injury)
3. (Argentina) Guillermo Coria (semifinals)
4. (Spain) Carlos Moyá (second round)
5. (Italy) Filippo Volandri (second round)
6. (Argentina) José Acasuso (quarterfinals)
7. (Russia) Igor Andreev (quarterfinals)
8. (Romania) Victor Hănescu (quarterfinals)

== Draw ==
Key

- Q = Qualifier
- WC = Wild card
- LL = Lucky loser
- Alt = Alternate
- ITF = ITF entry
- PR = Protected ranking
- SR = Special ranking
- SE = Special exempt
- JE = Junior exempt
- JR = Junior Accelerator Programme entrant
- CO = College Accelerator Programme entrant
- NG = Next Gen Accelerator Program entrant
- w/o = Walkover
- r = Retired
- d = Defaulted

=== Finals ===
Semifinals
(Germany) Florian Mayer	6	5	6
3	(Argentina) Guillermo Coria	4	7	3
(Italy) Potito Starace	6	5	4
(France) Gaël Monfils	3	7	6

Final
(Germany) Florian Mayer	6^{6}	6	5
(France) Gaël Monfils	7^{8}	4	7

=== Top half ===
First round
1	(Argentina) M Puerta	4	6^{1}
(Finland) J Nieminen	6	7^{7}
Q	(Spain) A Portas	6^{2}	6	4
(Spain) N Almagro	7^{7}	3	6
(Argentina) M Zabaleta	4	6	1
(Germany) F Mayer	6	4	6
WC	(Poland) Ł Kubot	3	1
5	(Italy) F Volandri	6	6
3	(Argentina) G Coria	6	4
WC	(Brazil) G Kuerten	3	0^{r}
Q	(Poland) M Matkowski	0	7^{7}	1
(Spain) F Mantilla	6	6^{2}	6
(Spain) Ó Hernández	6	1	4
(Romania) R Sabău	2	6	6
(Spain) G García López	2	7^{7}	2
7	(Russia) I Andreev	6	6^{4}	6

Second round
(Finland) J Nieminen	3	6	7^{8}
(Spain) N Almagro	6	4	6^{6}
(Germany) F Mayer	6	7
5	(Italy) F Volandri	3	5
3	(Argentina) G Coria	3	6	6
(Spain) F Mantilla	6	3	3
(Romania) R Sabău	3	1^{r}
7	(Russia) I Andreev	6	5

Quarterfinals
(Finland) J Nieminen	2	2
(Germany) F Mayer	6	6
3	(Argentina) G Coria	6	7^{7}
7	(Russia) I Andreev	4	6^{5}

Semifinals
(Germany) F Mayer	6	5	6
3	(Argentina) G Coria	4	7	3

=== Bottom half ===
First round
6	(Argentina) J Acasuso	7	4	7
(Czech Republic) J Vaněk	5	6	5
(Italy) A di Mauro	3	7	1
WC	(Poland) A Chadaj	6	5	6
(Austria) S Koubek	4	2
(Italy) P Starace	6	6
Q	(Poland) M Fyrstenberg	7^{7}	3	5
4	(Spain) C Moyá	6^{5}	6	7
8	(Romania) V Hănescu	7^{7}	5	6
(Spain) A Montañés	6^{3}	7	3
(Germany) P Kohlschreiber	5	3
(Spain) A Costa	7	6
LL	(United Kingdom) A Mackin	3	1
(Argentina) J Mónaco	6	6
(France) G Monfils	6	6
Q	(Costa Rica) JA Marín	0	4

Second round
6	(Argentina) J Acasuso	6	6
WC	(Poland) A Chadaj	3	4
(Italy) P Starace	2	7^{7}	7
4	(Spain) C Moyá	6	6^{0}	5
8	(Romania) V Hănescu	6	6
(Spain) A Costa	3	4
(Argentina) J Mónaco	4	6^{5}
(France) G Monfils	6	7^{7}

Quarterfinals
6	(Argentina) J Acasuso	6	4	4
(Italy) P Starace	4	6	6
8	(Romania) V Hănescu	3	3
(France) G Monfils	6	6

Semifinals
(Italy) P Starace	6	5	4
(France) G Monfils	3	7	6
