= 2018 Qatar ExxonMobil Open – Singles =

Singles
- 2018 Qatar ExxonMobil Open

Final
- Champion: (France) Gaël Monfils
- Runner-up: (Russia) Andrey Rublev
- Score: 6–2, 6–3

Details
- Draw: 32 (4 Q / 3 WC )
- Seeds: 8

Events
Singles	Doubles
- ATP Qatar Open

Gaël Monfils defeated Andrey Rublev in the final, 6–2, 6–3 to win the singles tennis title at the 2018 Qatar Open.

Novak Djokovic was the two-time reigning champion, but withdrew before the tournament due to an elbow injury.

== Seeds ==
1. (Austria) Dominic Thiem (semifinals, withdrew due to illness)
2. (Spain) Pablo Carreño Busta (first round)
3. (Czech Republic) Tomáš Berdych (first round)
4. (Spain) Albert Ramos Viñolas (first round)
5. (France) Richard Gasquet (second round)
6. (Serbia) Filip Krajinović (first round)
7. (Spain) Fernando Verdasco (second round)
8. (Spain) Feliciano López (second round)

== Draw ==
=== Finals ===
Semifinals
1	(Austria) Dominic Thiem
WC	(France) Gaël Monfils	w/o
(Argentina) Guido Pella	2	6	6^{2}
(Russia) Andrey Rublev	6	4	7^{7}

Final
WC	(France) Gaël Monfils	6	6
(Russia) Andrey Rublev	2	3

=== Top half ===
First round
1	(Austria) D Thiem	7^{7}	6
(Russia) E Donskoy	6^{3}	3
(Slovenia) A Bedene	7	6
WC	(Tunisia) M Jaziri	5	1
(Germany) F Mayer	6	5	4
Q	(Greece) S Tsitsipas	4	7	6
Alt	(Dominican Republic) V Estrella Burgos	0	2
5	(France) R Gasquet	6	6
3	(Czech Republic) T Berdych	4	6	6^{4}
(Germany) J-L Struff	6	1	7^{7}
(Italy) P Lorenzi	3	6	4
WC	(France) G Monfils	6	3	6
(Serbia) V Troicki	6	6^{5}	4
Q	(Italy) M Berrettini	4	7^{7}	6
(Germany) P Gojowczyk	6	6
6	(Serbia) F Krajinović	4	1

Second round
1	(Austria) D Thiem	7	6
(Slovenia) A Bedene	5	4
Q	(Greece) S Tsitsipas	6	6
5	(France) R Gasquet	3	4
(Germany) J-L Struff	3	6	3
WC	(France) G Monfils	6	1	6
Q	(Italy) M Berrettini	2	2
(Germany) P Gojowczyk	6	6

Quarterfinals
1	(Austria) D Thiem	7	6
Q	(Greece) S Tsitsipas	5	4
WC	(France) G Monfils	6	7^{8}
(Germany) P Gojowczyk	3	6^{6}

Semifinals
1	(Austria) D Thiem
WC	(France) G Monfils	w/o

=== Bottom half ===
First round
8	(Spain) F López	6	5	7^{7}
(Spain) G García López	4	7	6^{3}
PR	(Austria) A Haider-Maurer	4	3
Q	(Bosnia and Herzegovina) M Bašić	6	6
WC	(Qatar) J Al-Mutawa	1	2
Q	(Italy) S Travaglia	6	6
(Argentina) G Pella	2	7	7
4	(Spain) A Ramos Viñolas	6	5	5
7	(Spain) F Verdasco	4	6	6
(Israel) D Sela	6	4	0
(Germany) C-M Stebe	1	0^{r}
(Russia) A Rublev	6	0
(Italy) T Fabbiano	4	3
(Georgia (country)) N Basilashvili	6	6
(Croatia) B Ćorić	5	6	7^{10}
2	(Spain) P Carreño Busta	7	2	6^{8}

Second round
8	(Spain) F López	4	6^{2}
Q	(Bosnia and Herzegovina) M Bašić	6	7^{7}
Q	(Italy) S Travaglia	6^{4}	3
(Argentina) G Pella	7^{7}	6
7	(Spain) F Verdasco	4	6	4
(Russia) A Rublev	6	3	6
(Georgia (country)) N Basilashvili	1	3
(Croatia) B Ćorić	6	6

Quarterfinals
Q	(Bosnia and Herzegovina) M Bašić	2	3
(Argentina) G Pella	6	6
(Russia) A Rublev	6	7
(Croatia) B Ćorić	3	5

Semifinals
(Argentina) G Pella	2	6	6^{2}
(Russia) A Rublev	6	4	7^{7}

== Qualifying ==
=== Seeds ===
1. (Italy) Andreas Seppi (qualifying competition)
2. (Germany) Maximilian Marterer (qualifying competition)
3. (Greece) Stefanos Tsitsipas (qualified)
4. (Germany) Dustin Brown (first round)
5. (Portugal) Pedro Sousa (first round, retired)
6. (Italy) Stefano Travaglia (qualified)
7. (Italy) Matteo Berrettini (qualified)
8. (Bosnia and Herzegovina) Mirza Bašić (qualified)

=== Qualifiers ===
1. (Bosnia and Herzegovina) Mirza Bašić
2. (Italy) Matteo Berrettini
3. (Greece) Stefanos Tsitsipas
4. (Italy) Stefano Travaglia

=== Qualifying draw ===
==== First qualifier ====
First round
1	(Italy) Andreas Seppi	6	6
(France) Calvin Hemery	4	3
(Russia) Alexey Vatutin	3	4
8	(Bosnia and Herzegovina) Mirza Bašić	6	6

Qualifying competition
1	(Italy) Andreas Seppi	6^{3}	7^{7}	6^{5}
8	(Bosnia and Herzegovina) Mirza Bašić	7^{7}	6^{5}	7^{7}

==== Second qualifier ====
First round
2	(Germany) Maximilian Marterer	6	6
WC	(Qatar) Mousa Shanan Zayed	1	1
(United Kingdom) Liam Broady	4	5
7	(Italy) Matteo Berrettini	6	7

Qualifying competition
2	(Germany) Maximilian Marterer	5	6^{4}
7	(Italy) Matteo Berrettini	7	7^{7}

==== Third qualifier ====
First round
3	(Greece) Stefanos Tsitsipas	6	6
WC	(Qatar) Mubarak Shannan Zayid	3	4
(Sweden) Elias Ymer	4
5	(Portugal) Pedro Sousa	2^{r}

Qualifying competition
3	(Greece) Stefanos Tsitsipas	7^{7}	7^{7}
(Sweden) Elias Ymer	6^{3}	6^{2}

==== Fourth qualifier ====
First round
4	(Germany) Dustin Brown	3	2
(Bosnia and Herzegovina) Aldin Šetkić	6	6
(Czech Republic) Václav Šafránek	6^{6}	6^{4}
6	(Italy) Stefano Travaglia	7^{8}	7^{7}

Qualifying competition
(Bosnia and Herzegovina) Aldin Šetkić	2	5
6	(Italy) Stefano Travaglia	6	7
