= 2006 Grand Prix de Tennis de Lyon – Doubles =

Doubles
- 2006 Grand Prix de Tennis de Lyon

Final
- Champions: (France) Julien Benneteau (France) Arnaud Clément
- Runners-up: (Czech Republic) František Čermák (Czech Republic) Jaroslav Levinský
- Score: 6–2, 6–7^{(3–7)}, [10–7]

Details
- Draw: 16
- Seeds: 4

Events
Singles	Doubles
- Grand Prix de Tennis de Lyon

Michaël Llodra and Fabrice Santoro were the defending champions, but Santoro did not participate this year. Llodra partnered Thierry Ascione, losing in the first round.

Julien Benneteau and Arnaud Clément won in the final 6–2, 6–7^{(3–7)}, [10–7], against František Čermák and Jaroslav Levinský.

== Seeds ==
1. (United States) ~~Bob Bryan / (United States) Mike Bryan~~ (withdrew)
2. (Czech Republic) ~~Martin Damm / (India) Leander Paes~~ (withdrew)
3. (Israel) Jonathan Erlich / (Israel) Andy Ram (quarterfinals)
4. (Czech Republic) František Čermák / (Czech Republic) Jaroslav Levinský (final)

== Draw ==
Key

- Q = Qualifier
- WC = Wild card
- LL = Lucky loser
- Alt = Alternate
- ITF = ITF entry
- PR = Protected ranking
- SR = Special ranking
- SE = Special exempt
- JE = Junior exempt
- JR = Junior Accelerator Programme entrant
- CO = College Accelerator Programme entrant
- NG = Next Gen Accelerator Program entrant
- w/o = Walkover
- r = Retired
- d = Defaulted

=== Draw ===
First round
Alt	(Italy) A Seppi (United States) V Spadea	5	4
(South Africa) J Coetzee (Netherlands) R Wassen	7	6
(France) N Mahut (France) P-H Mathieu	6	6
WC	(France) O Patience (France) A Sidorenko	1	2
4	(Czech Republic) F Čermák (Czech Republic) J Levinský	6	3	[10]
WC	(France) T Ascione (France) M Llodra	4	6	[7]
(France) M Gicquel (France) F Serra	w/o
(France) R Gasquet (France) S Grosjean
(Spain) N Almagro (Chile) N Massú	1	5
(France) J Benneteau (France) A Clément	6	7
(Germany) C Kas (Austria) O Marach	3	5
3	(Israel) J Erlich (Israel) A Ram	6	7
(Czech Republic) L Friedl (Slovakia) M Mertiňák	6	6
(United States) R Ginepri (Australia) J Kerr	1	3
(Slovakia) D Hrbatý (Sweden) R Söderling	6	6
Alt	(France) J Eysseric (France) C Saulnier	2	1

Quarterfinals
(South Africa) J Coetzee (Netherlands) R Wassen	6	7
(France) N Mahut (France) P-H Mathieu	2	5
4	(Czech Republic) F Čermák (Czech Republic) J Levinský	6	6
(France) M Gicquel (France) F Serra	3	2
(France) J Benneteau (France) A Clément	6	6
3	(Israel) J Erlich (Israel) A Ram	3	4
(Czech Republic) L Friedl (Slovakia) M Mertiňák	5	7^{9}	[5]
(Slovakia) D Hrbatý (Sweden) R Söderling	7	6^{7}	[10]

Semifinals
(South Africa) J Coetzee (Netherlands) R Wassen	6	6^{5}	[4]
4	(Czech Republic) F Čermák (Czech Republic) J Levinský	4	7^{7}	[10]
(France) J Benneteau (France) A Clément	6	6
(Slovakia) D Hrbatý (Sweden) R Söderling	2	1

Final
4	(Czech Republic) F Čermák (Czech Republic) J Levinský	2	7^{7}	[7]
(France) J Benneteau (France) A Clément	6	6^{3}	[10]
