= 2006 Grand Prix de Tennis de Lyon – Singles =

Singles
- 2006 Grand Prix de Tennis de Lyon

Final
- Champion: (France) Richard Gasquet
- Runner-up: (France) Marc Gicquel
- Score: 6–3, 6–1

Events
Singles	Doubles
- Grand Prix de Tennis de Lyon

Andy Roddick was the defending champion, but did not participate this year.

Richard Gasquet won the tournament, beating Marc Gicquel 6–3, 6–1 in the final.

== Seeds ==
1. (Cyprus) Marcos Baghdatis (first round)
2. (Argentina) Gastón Gaudio (first round)
3. (Slovakia) Dominik Hrbatý (second round)
4. (France) Richard Gasquet (champion)
5. (Sweden) Robin Söderling (quarterfinals)
6. (France) Sébastien Grosjean (quarterfinals)
7. (Belgium) Xavier Malisse (semifinals)
8. (Spain) Nicolás Almagro (quarterfinals)

== Draw ==
Key

- Q = Qualifier
- WC = Wild card
- LL = Lucky loser
- Alt = Alternate
- ITF = ITF entry
- PR = Protected ranking
- SR = Special ranking
- SE = Special exempt
- JE = Junior exempt
- JR = Junior Accelerator Programme entrant
- CO = College Accelerator Programme entrant
- NG = Next Gen Accelerator Program entrant
- w/o = Walkover
- r = Retired
- d = Defaulted

=== Finals ===
Semifinals
(France) Arnaud Clément	7^{8}	4	1
4	(France) Richard Gasquet	6^{6}	6	6
(France) Marc Gicquel	6	1	7^{7}
7	(Belgium) Xavier Malisse	4	6	6^{5}

Final
4	(France) Richard Gasquet	6	6
(France) Marc Gicquel	3	1

=== Top half ===
First round
1	(Cyprus) M Baghdatis	2	7	3
(France) A Clément	6	5	6
WC	(France) M Llodra	4	7^{7}	6
Q	(Slovakia) M Mertiňák	6	6^{4}	2
(France) N Mahut	6^{5}	3
(Germany) F Mayer	7^{7}	6
(Austria) O Marach	6	5	1
8	(Spain) N Almagro	2	7	6
4	(France) R Gasquet	6	7^{7}
(Russia) M Safin	4	6^{5}
(Belgium) D Norman	6	7
WC	(France) O Patience	4	5
(Chile) N Massú	7^{8}	7
(United States) K Kim	6^{6}	5
WC	(France) T Ascione	3	1
5	(Sweden) R Söderling	6	6

Second round
(France) A Clément	2	6	7^{7}
WC	(France) M Llodra	6	1	6^{2}
(Germany) F Mayer	6^{5}	4
8	(Spain) N Almagro	7^{7}	6
4	(France) R Gasquet	6	6
(Belgium) D Norman	3	4
(Chile) N Massú	5	3
5	(Sweden) R Söderling	7	6

Quarterfinals
(France) A Clément	6	6
8	(Spain) N Almagro	3	2
4	(France) R Gasquet	4	6	6
5	(Sweden) R Söderling	6	3	3

Semifinals
(France) A Clément	7^{8}	4	1
4	(France) R Gasquet	6^{6}	6	6

=== Bottom half ===
First round
6	(France) S Grosjean	6	7^{7}
(France) P-H Mathieu	3	6^{3}
Q	(Colombia) A Falla	7^{11}	3	2
Q	(France) C Saulnier	6^{9}	6	6
(France) M Gicquel	6	6
(Italy) A Seppi	4	3
(France) F Serra	6	3	3
3	(Slovakia) D Hrbatý	3	6	6
7	(Belgium) X Malisse	6	4	6
(United States) V Spadea	3	6	1
(France) J Benneteau	7	6
Q	(France) J Mathieu	5	4
(United States) R Ginepri	7^{7}	7^{7}
(France) G Simon	6^{3}	6^{5}
(Germany) S Greul	6	6
2	(Argentina) G Gaudio	0	2

Second round
6	(France) S Grosjean	7^{7}	6
Q	(France) C Saulnier	6^{5}	2
(France) M Gicquel	6	6
3	(Slovakia) D Hrbatý	3	3
7	(Belgium) X Malisse	6	7^{7}
(France) J Benneteau	2	6^{5}
(United States) R Ginepri	6	6
(Germany) S Greul	1	2

Quarterfinals
6	(France) S Grosjean	5	6	6^{5}
(France) M Gicquel	7	1	7^{7}
7	(Belgium) X Malisse	6	6
(United States) R Ginepri	4	3

Semifinals
(France) M Gicquel	6	1	7^{7}
7	(Belgium) X Malisse	4	6	6^{5}
