= Ivan Ljubičić career statistics =

Career finals
Discipline	Type	Won	Lost	Total	WR ^{1}
Singles	Grand Slam tournaments	–	–	–	–
Singles	Year-end championships	–	–	–	–
Singles	ATP Masters 1000 ^{2}	1	3	4	0.25
Singles	Olympic Games	–	–	–	–
Singles	ATP Tour 500	2	3	5	0.40
Singles	ATP Tour 250	7	8	15	0.47
Singles	Total	10	14	24	0.42
Doubles	Grand Slam tournaments	–	–	–	–
Doubles	Year-end championships	–	–	–	–
Doubles	ATP Masters 1000 ^{2}	–	–	–	–
Doubles	Olympic Games	–	–	–	–
Doubles	ATP Tour 500	–	–	–	–
Doubles	ATP Tour 250	–	4	4	0.00
Doubles	Total	–	4	4	0.00
Total		10	18	28	0.36
^{1)} WR = Winning Rate^{2)} Formerly known as "Super 9" (1996–1999), "Tennis Masters Series" (2000–2003) or "ATP Masters Series" (2004–2008)

This is a list of main career statistics of Croatian former professional tennis player Ivan Ljubičić. All statistics are according to the ATP World Tour and ITF website.

== Significant finals ==
=== Olympics medal matches ===
==== Doubles: 1 (1 bronze medal) ====
Result	Year	Tournament	Surface	Opponents	Partner	Score
|Bronze	2004	Summer Olympics	Hard	(Croatia) Mario Ančić	(India) Mahesh Bhupathi (India) Leander Paes	7–6^{(7–5)}, 4–6, 16–14

=== ATP Masters Series tournaments ===
==== Singles: 4 (1 title, 3 runners-up) ====
Result	Year	Tournament	Surface	Opponent	Score
Loss	2005	Madrid, Spain	Hard (i)	(Spain) Rafael Nadal	6–3, 6–2, 3–6, 4–6, 6–7^{(3–7)}
Loss	2005	Paris, France	Carpet (i)	(Czech Republic) Tomáš Berdych	3–6, 4–6, 6–3, 6–4, 4–6
Loss	2006	Miami, US	Hard	(Switzerland) Roger Federer	6–7^{(5–7)}, 6–7^{(4–7)}, 6–7^{(6–8)}
Win	2010	Indian Wells, US	Hard	(United States) Andy Roddick	7–6^{(7–3)}, 7–6^{(7–5)}

== Career finals ==
=== ATP career finals ===
==== Singles: 24 (10 titles, 14 runners-up) ====
Legend Grand Slam (0–0) ATP World Tour Finals (0–0) ATP World Tour Masters 1000 (1–3) ATP World Tour 500 Series (2–3) ATP World Tour 250 Series (7–8)	Titles by surface Hard (7–12) Clay (0–0) Grass (1–0) Carpet (2–2)	Titles by setting Outdoors (4–4) Indoors (6–10)

Result	W–L	Date	Tournament	Surface	Opponent	Score
Win	1–0	Oct 2001	Lyon, France	Carpet (i)	(Morocco) Younes El Aynaoui	6–3, 6–2
Loss	1–1	Jan 2004	Doha, Qatar	Hard	(France) Nicolas Escudé	3–6, 6–7^{(4–7)}
Loss	1–2	Jan 2005	Doha, Qatar	Hard	(Switzerland) Roger Federer	3–6, 1–6
Loss	1–3	Feb 2005	Marseille, France	Hard (i)	(Sweden) Joachim Johansson	5–7, 4–6
Loss	1–4	Feb 2005	Rotterdam, Netherlands	Hard (i)	(Switzerland) Roger Federer	7–5, 5–7, 6–7^{(5–7)}
Loss	1–5	Feb 2005	Dubai, UAE	Hard	(Switzerland) Roger Federer	1–6, 7–6^{(8–6)}, 3–6
Win	2–5	Oct 2005	Metz, France	Hard (i)	(France) Gaël Monfils	7–6^{(9–7)}, 6–0
Win	3–5	Oct 2005	Vienna, Austria	Hard (i)	(Spain) Juan Carlos Ferrero	6–2, 6–4, 7–6^{(7–5)}
Loss	3–6	Oct 2005	Madrid, Spain	Hard (i)	(Spain) Rafael Nadal	6–3, 6–2, 3–6, 4–6, 6–7^{(3–7)}
Loss	3–7	Nov 2005	Paris, France	Carpet (i)	(Czech Republic) Tomáš Berdych	3–6, 4–6, 6–3, 6–4, 4–6
Win	4–7	Jan 2006	Chennai, India	Hard	(Spain) Carlos Moyà	7–6^{(8–6)}, 6–2
Win	5–7	Feb 2006	Zagreb, Croatia	Carpet (i)	(Austria) Stefan Koubek	6–3, 6–4
Loss	5–8	Apr 2006	Miami, USA	Hard	(Switzerland) Roger Federer	6–7^{(5–7)}, 6–7^{(4–7)}, 6–7^{(6–8)}
Loss	5–9	Oct 2006	Bangkok, Thailand	Hard (i)	(United States) James Blake	3–6, 1–6
Win	6–9	Oct 2006	Vienna, Austria (2)	Hard (i)	(Chile) Fernando González	6–3, 6–4, 7–5
Win	7–9	Jan 2007	Doha, Qatar	Hard	(United Kingdom) Andy Murray	6–4, 6–4
Loss	7–10	Feb 2007	Zagreb, Croatia	Carpet (i)	(Cyprus) Marcos Baghdatis	6–7^{(4–7)}, 6–4, 4–6
Loss	7–11	Feb 2007	Rotterdam, Netherlands	Hard (i)	(Russia) Mikhail Youzhny	2–6, 4–6
Win	8–11	Jun 2007	's-Hertogenbosch, Netherlands	Grass	(Netherlands) Peter Wessels	7–6^{(7–5)}, 4–6, 7–6^{(7–4)}
Loss	8–12	Mar 2008	Zagreb, Croatia	Hard (i)	(Ukraine) Sergiy Stakhovsky	5–7, 4–6
Win	9–12	Nov 2009	Lyon, France (2)	Hard (i)	(France) Michaël Llodra	7–5, 6–3
Win	10–12	Mar 2010	Indian Wells, USA	Hard	(United States) Andy Roddick	7–6^{(7–3)}, 7–6^{(7–5)}
Loss	10–13	Oct 2010	Montpellier, France	Hard (i)	(France) Gaël Monfils	2–6, 7–5, 1–6
Loss	10–14	Sep 2011	Metz, France	Hard (i)	(France) Jo-Wilfried Tsonga	3–6, 7–6^{(7–4)}, 3–6

==== Doubles: 4 (4 runners-up) ====
Legend Grand Slam (0–0) ATP World Tour Finals (0–0) ATP World Tour Masters 1000 (0–0) ATP World Tour 500 Series (0–0) ATP World Tour 250 Series (0–4)	Titles by surface Hard (0–1) Clay (0–2) Grass (0–0) Carpet (0–1)	Titles by setting Outdoors (0–2) Indoors (0–2)

Result	W–L	Date	Tournament	Surface	Partner	Opponents	Score
Loss	0–1	Jul 2000	Umag, Croatia	Clay	(Croatia) Lovro Zovko	(Spain) Álex López Morón (Spain) Albert Portas	1–6, 6–7^{(2–7)}
Loss	0–2	Nov 2000	Lyon, France	Carpet (i)	(United States) Jack Waite	(Netherlands) Paul Haarhuis (Australia) Sandon Stolle	1–6, 7–6^{(7–2)}, 6–7^{(7–9)}
Loss	0–3	Jul 2001	Umag, Croatia	Clay	(Croatia) Lovro Zovko	(Argentina) Sergio Roitman (Argentina) Andrés Schneiter	2–6, 5–7
Loss	0–4	Oct 2004	Metz, France	Hard (i)	(Italy) Uros Vico	(France) Arnaud Clément (France) Nicolas Mahut	2–6, 6–7^{(8–10)}

=== ATP Challenger and ITF Futures finals ===
==== Singles: 6 (4 titles, 2 runners-up) ====
Legend ATP Challenger Tour (2–2) ITF Futures Tour (2–0)	Titles by surface Hard (4–1) Clay (0–1) Grass (0–0) Carpet (0–0)	Titles by setting Outdoors (4–1) Indoors (0–1)

Result	W–L	Date	Tournament	Surface	Opponent	Score
Loss	0–1	Jun 1997	Zagreb, Croatia	Clay	(Spain) Alberto Berasategui	1–6, 2–6
Win	1–1	Mar 1999	Besançon, France	Hard	(France) Lionel Roux	6–4, 6–2
Loss	1–2	Oct 2001	Grenoble, France	Hard (i)	(Sweden) Johan Settergren	7–5, 6–7^{(4–7)}, 5–7
Win	2–2	Feb 2008	East London, South Africa	Hard	(Austria) Stefan Koubek	7–6^{(7–2)}, 6–2
Win	1–0	Feb 1999	Croatia F1, Zagreb	Hard	(Bulgaria) Ivaylo Traykov	6–3, 6–7, 6–2
Win	2–0	Feb 1999	Croatia F2, Zagreb	Hard	(Italy) Igor Gaudi	7–6, 6–2

==== Doubles: 3 (1 title, 2 runners-up) ====
Legend ATP Challenger Tour (1–0) ITF Futures Tour (0–2)	Titles by surface Hard (0–0) Clay (1–1) Grass (0–0) Carpet (0–1)	Titles by setting Outdoors (1–1) Indoors (0–1)

Result	W–L	Date	Tournament	Surface	Partner	Opponents	Score
Win	1–0	Jun 1999	Zagreb, Croatia	Clay	(Croatia) Lovro Zovko	(France) Jérôme Hanquez (France) Régis Lavergne	6–3, 6–0
Loss	0–1	Apr 1998	Italy F5, Frascati	Clay	(Italy) Omar Camporese	(Italy) Giorgio Galimberti (Italy) Massimo Valeri	6–7, 1–6
Loss	0–2	Feb 1999	Great Britain F1, Leeds	Carpet (i)	(France) Régis Lavergne	(Czech Republic) Leoš Friedl (Slovenia) Borut Urh	6–7, 5–7

== Performance timelines ==
Key
W	F	SF	QF	#R	RR	Q#	DNQ	A	NH

(W) winner; (F) finalist; (SF) semifinalist; (QF) quarterfinalist; (#R) rounds 4, 3, 2, 1; (RR) round-robin stage; (Q#) qualification round; (DNQ) did not qualify; (A) absent; (NH) not held; (SR) strike rate (events won / competed); (W–L) win–loss record.

Current till 2012 Monte-Carlo Rolex Masters.

=== Singles ===
			Professional Career																
Tournament	1996	1997	1998	1999	2000	2001	2002	2003	2004	2005	2006	2007	2008	2009	2010	2011	2012	SR	W–L
Grand Slam Tournaments
Australian Open	A	Q2	Q1	A	1R	1R	3R	1R	2R	2R	QF	1R	1R	2R	3R	3R	1R	0 / 13	13–13
French Open	A	A	A	Q2	1R	1R	1R	3R	2R	1R	SF	3R	4R	1R	3R	4R	A	0 / 12	18–12
Wimbledon	A	A	A	A	1R	1R	2R	2R	1R	1R	3R	3R	1R	A	1R	3R	A	0 / 11	8–11
US Open	A	Q2	A	2R	1R	2R	2R	2R	1R	3R	1R	3R	A	1R	1R	2R	A	0 / 12	9–12
Win–loss	0–0	0–0	0–0	1–1	0–4	1–4	4–4	4–4	2–4	3–4	11–4	6–4	3–3	1–3	4–4	8–4	0–1	0 / 48	48–48
Year-end championships
Tennis Masters Cup	did not qualify									RR	RR	did not qualify						0 / 2	2–4
National representation
Summer Olympics	A	not held			3R	not held			3R	not held			A	not held			A	0 / 2	4–2
Davis Cup	A	A	Z1	Z1	Z2	Z1	PO	QF	1R	W	QF	1R	A	A	QF	A	A	1 / 6	23–13
ATP Masters Series
Indian Wells Masters	A	A	A	A	A	Q2	1R	A	1R	4R	QF	QF	4R	QF	W	2R	A	1 / 9	20–8
Miami Masters	A	A	A	A	1R	QF	2R	2R	3R	4R	F	SF	2R	1R	2R	1R	A	0 / 12	17–12
Monte-Carlo Masters	A	A	Q1	3R	Q1	1R	1R	3R	3R	1R	QF	3R	2R	QF	3R	QF	1R	0 / 13	18–13
Rome Masters	A	A	A	A	A	1R	3R	QF	2R	3R	1R	2R	1R	A	3R	2R	A	0 / 10	11–9
Hamburg Masters (Note: Held as Hamburg Masters (outdoor clay) until 2008, Madrid Masters (outdoor clay) 2009 – present.)	A	A	A	A	Q2	Q2	1R	1R	SF	2R	2R	3R	2R	QF	A	1R	A	0 / 9	11–9
Canada Masters	A	A	A	A	A	2R	1R	1R	2R	1R	3R	1R	A	A	A	A	A	0 / 7	4–7
Cincinnati Masters	A	A	A	2R	A	QF	2R	2R	2R	1R	QF	2R	A	2R	1R	A	A	0 / 10	12–10
Madrid Masters (Note: Held as Madrid Masters (indoor hard) from 2002 to 2008, and Shanghai Masters (outdoor hard) 2009 – present.)	not held						3R	1R	SF	F	2R	2R	Q2	QF	2R	1R	A	0 / 9	14–10
Paris Masters	A	A	A	Q2	A	2R	2R	A	2R	F	A	2R	2R	2R	2R	A	A	0 / 8	9–8
Win–loss	0–0	0–0	0–0	3–2	0–1	9–6	6–9	6–7	16–9	15–9	17–8	10–9	5–6	15–7	10–5	4–6	0–1	1 / 87	116–85
Career statistics
Finals	0	0	0	0	0	1	0	0	1	8	5	4	1	1	2	1	0	24	
Titles	0	0	0	0	0	1	0	0	0	2	3	2	0	1	1	0	0	10	
Overall win–loss	1–1	1–4	2–3	11–14	23–22	29–22	29–29	29–25	37–24	57–24	61–20	44–23	19–18	32–23	26–19	25–20	3–6	429–296	
Win %	50%	20%	40%	44%	51%	57%	50%	54%	61%	70%	75%	66%	51%	58%	58%	56%	33%	59.17%	
Year-end ranking	576	289	293	77	91	37	49	42	22	9	5	18	45	24	17	30	NR		

== Record against top 10 players ==
Ljubičić's record against players who held a top 10 ranking, with those who reached No. 1 in bold

=== Singles ===
- (France) Arnaud Clément 10–2
- (Russia) Mikhail Youzhny 8–1
- (Croatia) Mario Ančić 5–1
- (Spain) Tommy Robredo 5–1
- (Thailand) Paradorn Srichaphan 5–2
- (Sweden) Thomas Johansson 5–3
- (Argentina) David Nalbandian 5–4
- (Germany) Nicolas Kiefer 4–0
- (United Kingdom) Tim Henman 4–1
- (United States) James Blake 4–2
- (France) Sébastien Grosjean 4–2
- (France) Gaël Monfils 4–3
- (Spain) **Carlos Moyá** 4–3
- (Russia) Nikolay Davydenko 4–4
- (Chile) Fernando González 4–4
- (United States) **Andy Roddick** 4–7
- (Slovakia) Karol Kučera 3–0
- (Spain) Fernando Verdasco 3–1
- (Spain) Nicolás Almagro 3–2
- (Czech Republic) Tomáš Berdych 3–2
- (United States) Mardy Fish 3–2
- (Russia) **Yevgeny Kafelnikov** 3–2
- (Ecuador) Nicolás Lapentti 3–2
- (France) Gilles Simon 3–2
- (Sweden) Robin Söderling 3–2
- (Spain) **Juan Carlos Ferrero** 3–3
- (France) Jo-Wilfried Tsonga 3–3
- (Switzerland) Stan Wawrinka 3–3
- (United Kingdom) **Andy Murray** 3–4
- (Germany) Rainer Schüttler 3–5
- (Switzerland) **Roger Federer** 3–13
- (Japan) Kei Nishikori 2–0
- (Croatia) Marin Čilić 2–1
- (Sweden) Joachim Johansson 2–1
- (Chile) Nicolás Massú 2–1
- (Argentina) Juan Mónaco 2–1
- (United States) **Andre Agassi** 2–2
- (Russia) **Marat Safin** 2–2
- (Serbia) Janko Tipsarević 2–2
- (Argentina) Guillermo Coria 2–3
- (Argentina) Gastón Gaudio 2–3
- (Germany) Tommy Haas 2–3
- (Cyprus) Marcos Baghdatis 2–4
- (Brazil) **Gustavo Kuerten** 2–5
- (Serbia) **Novak Djokovic** 2–7
- (Spain) **Rafael Nadal** 2–7
- (Latvia) Ernests Gulbis 1–0
- (Croatia) Goran Ivanišević 1–0
- (United States) Todd Martin 1–0
- (Ukraine) Andriy Medvedev 1–0
- (Australia) Mark Philippoussis 1–0
- (France) Cédric Pioline 1–0
- (United Kingdom) Greg Rusedski 1–0
- (Spain) Albert Costa 1–1
- (Argentina) Juan Martín del Potro 1–1
- (Sweden) Thomas Enqvist 1–1
- (Spain) Félix Mantilla 1–2
- (Czech Republic) Radek Štěpánek 1–2
- (Sweden) Magnus Norman 1–3
- (South Africa) Wayne Ferreira 1–4
- (Spain) David Ferrer 1–6
- (Sweden) Jonas Björkman 0–1
- (Australia) **Lleyton Hewitt** 0–1
- (Netherlands) Richard Krajicek 0–1
- (Sweden) Magnus Larsson 0–1
- (Argentina) Guillermo Cañas 0–2
- (Spain) Àlex Corretja 0–2
- (France) Richard Gasquet 0–2
- (Argentina) Mariano Puerta 0–2
- (Czech Republic) Jiří Novák 0–3
- (Chile) **Marcelo Ríos** 0–3
- (Switzerland) Marc Rosset 0–3
- (Austria) Jürgen Melzer 0–5

==== Wins per season ====
Season	1997	1998	1999	2000	2001	2002	2003	2004	2005	2006	2007	2008	2009	2010	2011	2012	**Total**
Wins	0	0	1	2	4	2	1	2	8	6	2	1	5	5	1	0	**40**

#	Player	Rank	Event	Surface	Rd	Score
1999
1.	(Russia) Yevgeny Kafelnikov	3	Monte Carlo, Monaco	Clay	2R	6–1, 6–2
2000
2.	(United States) Todd Martin	8	Sydney, Australia	Hard	2R	7–6^{(13–11)}, 6–4
3.	(Russia) Yevgeny Kafelnikov	3	Marseille, France	Hard (i)	2R	7–6^{(7–5)}, 6–3
2001
4.	(Sweden) Magnus Norman	6	Miami, United States	Hard	3R	7–6^{(7–5)}, 6–2
5.	(United States) Andre Agassi	2	Montreal, Canada	Hard	1R	6–2, 6–4
6.	(Brazil) Gustavo Kuerten	**1**	Lyon, France	Carpet (i)	1R	7–6^{(7–1)}, 6–2
7.	(Russia) Marat Safin	7	Lyon, France	Carpet (i)	SF	6–7^{(3–7)}, 7–6^{(7–4)}, 7–6^{(9–7)}
2002
8.	(Russia) Yevgeny Kafelnikov	4	Rotterdam, Netherlands	Hard (i)	2R	7–6^{(7–4)}, 4–6, 6–3
9.	(Spain) Juan Carlos Ferrero	3	Rome, Italy	Clay	2R	7–5, 6–2
2003
10.	(Switzerland) Roger Federer	3	Basel, Switzerland	Carpet (i)	2R	7–6^{(7–5)}, 6–7^{(5–7)}, 6–4
2004
11.	(France) Sébastien Grosjean	10	Doha, Qatar	Hard	QF	6–3, 5–7, 6–4
12.	(United Kingdom) Tim Henman	5	Madrid, Spain	Hard (i)	3R	6–4, 4–6, 6–2
2005
13.	(United Kingdom) Tim Henman	7	Dubai, United Arab Emirates	Hard	QF	7–5, 6–4
14.	(United States) Andre Agassi	9	Davis Cup, Los Angeles, United States	Hard	RR	6–3, 7–6^{(7–0)}, 6–3
15.	(United States) Andy Roddick	3	Davis Cup, Los Angeles, United States	Hard	RR	4–6, 6–3, 7–6^{(13–11)}, 6–7^{(7–9)}, 6–2
16.	(Russia) Nikolay Davydenko	7	Davis Cup, Split, Croatia	Carpet (i)	RR	6–3, 7–6^{(8–6)}, 6–4
17.	(Russia) Nikolay Davydenko	7	Metz, France	Hard (i)	SF	6–1, 6–4
18.	(Argentina) David Nalbandian	9	Madrid, Spain	Hard (i)	SF	6–3, 3–6, 6–3
19.	(United States) Andy Roddick	3	Paris, France	Carpet (i)	SF	6–3, 7–5
20.	(Argentina) Guillermo Coria	6	Tennis Masters Cup, Shanghai, China	Carpet (i)	RR	6–2, 6–3
2006
21.	(Argentina) David Nalbandian	3	Miami, United States	Hard	SF	6–1, 6–2
22.	(Argentina) David Nalbandian	3	Davis Cup, Zagreb, Croatia	Carpet (i)	RR	6–3, 6–4, 6–4
23.	(United States) James Blake	8	World Team Cup, Düsseldorf, Germany	Clay	RR	5–7, 6–3, 7–6^{(7–4)}
24.	(Chile) Fernando González	9	World Team Cup, Düsseldorf, Germany	Clay	RR	7–5, 6–7^{(4–7)}, 6–4
25.	(Chile) Fernando González	10	Vienna, Austria	Hard (i)	F	6–3, 6–4, 7–5
26.	(Argentina) David Nalbandian	7	Tennis Masters Cup, Shanghai, China	Hard (i)	RR	5–7, 7–6^{(9–7)}, 7–5
2007
27.	(Russia) Nikolay Davydenko	3	Rotterdam, Netherlands	Hard (i)	SF	4–6, 7–6^{(7–4)}, 7–6^{(7–4)}
28.	(Argentina) David Nalbandian	10	Indian Wells, United States	Hard	4R	2–6, 6–4, 6–2
2008
29.	(Russia) Nikolay Davydenko	4	French Open, Paris, France	Clay	3R	4–6, 2–6, 6–3, 6–2, 6–4
2009
30.	(France) Gilles Simon	8	Indian Wells, United States	Hard	3R	6–3, 7–6^{(7–3)}
31.	(Argentina) Juan Martín del Potro	5	Monte Carlo, Monaco	Clay	2R	4–6, 6–1, 6–4
32.	(France) Jo-Wilfried Tsonga	9	Madrid, Spain	Clay	2R	6–4, 7–5
33.	(France) Gilles Simon	7	Madrid, Spain	Clay	3R	3–6, 6–4, 6–3
34.	(Spain) Fernando Verdasco	9	Shanghai, China	Hard	2R	6–4, 7–6^{(8–6)}
2010
35.	(Serbia) Novak Djokovic	2	Indian Wells, United States	Hard	4R	7–5, 6–3
36.	(Spain) Rafael Nadal	3	Indian Wells, United States	Hard	SF	3–6, 6–4, 7–6^{(7–1)}
37.	(United States) Andy Roddick	8	Indian Wells, United States	Hard	F	7–6^{(7–3)}, 7–6^{(7–5)}
38.	(Russia) Mikhail Youzhny	9	Beijing, China	Hard	1R	6–3, 7–6^{(7–3)}
39.	(United Kingdom) Andy Murray	4	Beijing, China	Hard	QF	6–3, 6–2
2011
40.	(Czech Republic) Tomáš Berdych	7	Monte Carlo, Monaco	Clay	3R	6–4, 6–2

== National participation ==
=== Team competitions finals: 2 (2 titles) ===
Result	No.	Date	Tournament	Surface	Partner	Opponents	Score
Win	1.	2–4 December 2005	Davis Cup, Bratislava, Slovakia	Hard (i)	(Croatia) Mario Ančić (Croatia) Ivo Karlović (Croatia) Goran Ivanišević	(Slovakia) Dominik Hrbatý (Slovakia) Karol Kučera (Slovakia) Michal Mertiňák	3–2
Win	2.	17–23 May 2006	World Team Cup, Düsseldorf, Germany,	Clay	(Croatia) Mario Ančić (Croatia) Ivo Karlović	(Germany) Nicolas Kiefer (Germany) Michael Kohlmann (Germany) Alexander Waske	2–1

=== Davis Cup (36–19) ===
Group membership World Group (24–11) WG Play-offs (4–0) Group I (5–8) Group II (3–0)	Matches by surface Hard (6–7) Clay (10–7) Grass (0–0) Carpet (20–5)	Matches by type Singles (23–13) Doubles (13–6)	Matches by setting Indoors (26–10) Outdoors (10–9)	Matches by venue Croatia (18–6) Away (18–13)

Rd	Date	Opponent nation	Score	Venue	Surface	Match	Opponent player(s)	Rubber score
1998
GI 1R	Feb 1998	Finland	2–3	Helsinki	Hard	Singles 1	Ville Liukko	6–4, 4–6, 5–7, 4–6
GI 1R	Feb 1998	Finland	2–3	Helsinki	Hard	Doubles (w/ Hiršzon)	Ketola / Liukko	2–6, 6–3, 6–4, 3–6, 4–6
GI 1R	Feb 1998	Finland	2–3	Helsinki	Hard	Singles 4	Tuomas Ketola	3–6, 3–6, 3–6
GI PO	Sep 1998	Norway	3–2	Oslo	Clay	Singles 2	Jan Frode Andersen	6–4, 6–4, 6–7^{(5–7)}, 6–4
GI PO	Sep 1998	Norway	3–2	Oslo	Clay	Doubles (w/ Zovko)	Andersen / Ruud	6–4, 3–6, 6–2, 3–6, 8–6
GI PO	Sep 1998	Norway	3–2	Oslo	Clay	Singles 4	Christian Ruud	6–1, 6–1, 6–3
1999
GI 2R	Apr 1999	Romania	2–3	Bucharest	Clay	Singles 1	Adrian Voinea	1–6, 4–6, 7–6^{(7–1)}, 6–7^{(5–7)}
GI 2R	Apr 1999	Romania	2–3	Bucharest	Clay	Doubles (w/ Zovko)	Pavel / Trifu	6–7^{(5–7)}, 6–7^{(5–7)}, 5–7
GI PO	Sep 1999	Portugal	1–4	Zagreb	Carpet (i)	Singles 1	Nuno Marques	4–6, 4–6, 6–3, 3–6
GI PO	Sep 1999	Portugal	1–4	Zagreb	Carpet (i)	Doubles (w/ Zovko)	Cuoto / Marques	7–6^{(7–4)}, 6–4, 6–7^{(8–10)}, 4–6, 2–6
2000
GII 1R	Apr 2000	Latvia	5–0	Jūrmala	Carpet (i)	Singles 2	Andris Fiļimonovs	7–6^{(7–0)} 7–6^{(8–6)}, 6–4
GII 1R	Apr 2000	Latvia	5–0	Jūrmala	Carpet (i)	Doubles (w/ Ivanišević)	Fiļimonovs / Dzelde	6–4, 3–6, 6–3, 6–2
GII 3R	Oct 2000	Ivory Coast	5–0	Rijeka	Carpet (i)	Singles 2	Valentin Sanon	6–3, 7–6^{(8–6)}, 6–3
2001
GI 2R	Apr 2001	Austria	4–1	Pula	Carpet (i)	Singles 2	Julian Knowle	4–6, 6–7^{(5–7)}, 6–7^{(3–7)}
GI 2R	Apr 2001	Austria	4–1	Pula	Carpet (i)	Doubles (w/ Ivanišević)	Knowle / Melzer	6–4, 7–6^{(9–7)}, 4–6, 6–3
GI 2R	Apr 2001	Austria	4–1	Pula	Carpet (i)	Singles 4	Stefan Koubek	5–7, 6–3, 7–6^{(7–3)}, 6–3
Q1	Sep 2001	Italy	3–2	Rome	Clay	Singles 2	Federico Luzzi	6–4, 6–2, 6–1
Q1	Sep 2001	Italy	3–2	Rome	Clay	Doubles (w/ Ivanišević)	Galimberti / Navarra	6–7^{(6–8)}, 3–6, 7–6^{(7–5)}, 6–2, 6–4
2002
1R	Feb 2002	Germany	4–1	Zagreb	Carpet (i)	Singles 1	Rainer Schüttler	7–5, 6–7^{(3–7)}, 3–6, 6–7^{(5–7)}
1R	Feb 2002	Germany	4–1	Zagreb	Carpet (i)	Doubles (w/ Ivanišević)	Kohlmann / Prinosil	6–4, 6–4, 7–5
1R	Feb 2002	Germany	4–1	Zagreb	Carpet (i)	Singles 5 (dead)	Nicolas Kiefer	7–6^{(7–1)}, 6–4
QF	Apr 2002	Argentina	2–3	Buenos Aires	Clay	Singles 1	Gastón Gaudio	6–7^{(5–7)}, 2–6, 3–6
QF	Apr 2002	Argentina	2–3	Buenos Aires	Clay	Doubles (w/ Ivanišević)	Arnold Ker / Cañas	4–6, 2–6, 6–3, 6–0, 8–6
QF	Apr 2002	Argentina	2–3	Buenos Aires	Clay	Singles 4	Juan Ignacio Chela	6–3, 1–6, 7–6^{(7–5)}, 6–4
2003
1R	Feb 2003	United States	4–1	Zagreb	Carpet (i)	Singles 1	Mardy Fish	7–5, 6–3, 6–4
1R	Feb 2003	United States	4–1	Zagreb	Carpet (i)	Doubles (w/ Ivanišević)	Blake / Fish	3–6, 4–6, 7–6^{(7–4)}, 6–4, 6–4
1R	Feb 2003	United States	4–1	Zagreb	Carpet (i)	Singles 4	James Blake	6–3, 6–7^{(5–7)}, 6–4, 6–3
QF	Apr 2003	Spain	0–5	Valencia	Clay	Singles 2	Carlos Moyá	7–6^{(7–5)}, 1–6, 4–6, 4–6
QF	Apr 2003	Spain	0–5	Valencia	Clay	Doubles (w/ Zovko)	Corretja / Costa	2–6, 3–6, 4–6
QF	Apr 2003	Spain	0–5	Valencia	Clay	Singles 4 (dead)	Albert Costa	3–6, 4–6
2004
1R	Feb 2004	France	1–4	Metz	Clay (i)	Singles 2	Thierry Ascione	7–5, 6–4, 6–4
1R	Feb 2004	France	1–4	Metz	Clay (i)	Singles 4	Arnaud Clément	2–6, 6–3, 6–7^{(3–7)}, 4–6
PO	Sep 2004	Belgium	3–2	Rijeka	Carpet (i)	Singles 1	Gilles Elseneer	7–6^{(8–6)}, 7–5, 6–4
PO	Sep 2004	Belgium	3–2	Rijeka	Carpet (i)	Doubles (w/ Ančić)	Norman / Vliegen	6–7^{(8–10)}, 6–4, 6–7^{(1–7)}, 6–3, 7–5
2005
1R	Mar 2005	United States	3–2	Los Angeles	Hard	Singles 1	Andre Agassi	6–3, 7–6^{(7–0)}, 6–3
1R	Mar 2005	United States	3–2	Los Angeles	Hard	Doubles (w/ Ančić)	B. Bryan / M. Bryan	3–6, 7–6^{(10–8)}, 6–4, 6–4
1R	Mar 2005	United States	3–2	Los Angeles	Hard	Singles 4	Andy Roddick	4–6, 6–3, 7–6^{(13–11)}, 6–7^{(7–9)}, 6–2
QF	Jul 2005	Romania	4–1	Split	Carpet (i)	Singles 2	Victor Hănescu	6–3, 6–2, 7–6^{(7–3)}
QF	Jul 2005	Romania	4–1	Split	Carpet (i)	Doubles (w/ Ančić)	Pavel / Trifu	5–7, 6–4, 6–7^{(9–11)}, 6–4, 6–4
QF	Jul 2005	Romania	4–1	Split	Carpet (i)	Singles 4	Andrei Pavel	6–3, 6–4, 6–3
SF	Sep 2005	Russia	3–2	Split	Carpet (i)	Singles 2	Mikhail Youzhny	3–6, 6–3, 6–4, 4–6, 6–4
SF	Sep 2005	Russia	3–2	Split	Carpet (i)	Doubles (w/ Ančić)	Andreev / Tursunov	6–2, 4–6, 7–6^{(7–5)}, 3–6, 6–4
SF	Sep 2005	Russia	3–2	Split	Carpet (i)	Singles 4	Nikolay Davydenko	6–3, 7–6^{(8–6)}, 6–4
F	Dec 2005	Slovakia	3–2	Bratislava	Hard (i)	Singles 1	Karol Kučera	6–3, 6–4, 6–3
F	Dec 2005	Slovakia	3–2	Bratislava	Hard (i)	Doubles (w/ Ančić)	Hrbatý / Mertiňák	7–6^{(7–5)}, 6–3, 7–6^{(7–5)}
F	Dec 2005	Slovakia	3–2	Bratislava	Hard (i)	Singles 4	Dominik Hrbatý	6–4, 3–6, 4–6, 6–3, 4–6
2006
1R	Feb 2006	Austria	3–2	Graz	Clay (i)	Singles 2	Stefan Koubek	6–2, 6–2, 6–4
1R	Feb 2006	Austria	3–2	Graz	Clay (i)	Doubles (w/ Ančić)	Knowle / Melzer	3–6, 3–6, 6–4, 6–4, 8–6
QF	Apr 2006	Argentina	2–3	Zagreb	Carpet (i)	Singles 1	Agustín Calleri	6–7^{(7–9)}, 5–7, 7–6^{(8–6)}, 6–1, 6–2
QF	Apr 2006	Argentina	2–3	Zagreb	Carpet (i)	Doubles (w/ Čilić)	Acasuso / Nalbandian	4–6, 2–6, 6–3, 4–6
QF	Apr 2006	Argentina	2–3	Zagreb	Carpet (i)	Singles 4	David Nalbandian	6–3, 6–4, 6–4
2007
1R	Feb 2007	Germany	2–3	Krefeld	Hard (i)	Singles 2	Benjamin Becker	6–7^{(4–7)}, 6–4, 6–2, 6–3
1R	Feb 2007	Germany	2–3	Krefeld	Hard (i)	Doubles (w/ Ančić)	Kohlmann / Waske	4–6, 2–6, 6–7^{(5–7)}
1R	Feb 2007	Germany	2–3	Krefeld	Hard (i)	Singles 4	Tommy Haas	2–6, 6–7^{(7–9)}, 4–6
2010
QF	Jul 2010	Serbia	1–4	Split	Hard (i)	Singles 1	Novak Djokovic	6–7^{(3–7)}, 4–6, 1–6
