= 2001 Grand Prix de Tennis de Lyon =

- Date: 8–14 October 2001
- Edition: 15th
- Category: International Series
- Draw: 32S / 16D
- Prize money: $775,000
- Surface: Carpet / indoor
- Location: Lyon, France
- Venue: Palais des Sports de Gerland

Champions

Singles
- (Croatia) Ivan Ljubičić

Doubles
- (Canada) Daniel Nestor / (Federal Republic of Yugoslavia) Nenad Zimonjić
← 2000 ·	Grand Prix de Tennis de Lyon	· 2002 →

The 2001 Grand Prix de Tennis de Lyon was a men's tennis tournament played on indoor carpet courts at the Palais des Sports de Gerland in Lyon, France, and was part of the International Series of the 2001 ATP Tour. It was the 15th edition of the tournament and took place from 8 October until 14 October 2001. Unseeded Ivan Ljubičić on the singles title.

== Finals ==
=== Singles ===
(Croatia) Ivan Ljubičić defeated (Morocco) Younes El Aynaoui 6–3, 6–2

- It was Ljubičić's only title of the year and the 1st of his career.

=== Doubles ===
(Canada) Daniel Nestor / (Federal Republic of Yugoslavia) Nenad Zimonjić defeated (France) Arnaud Clément / (France) Sébastien Grosjean 6–1, 6–2

- It was Nestor's 4th title of the year and the 20th of his career. It was Zimonjić's only title of the year and the 4th of his career.
