= 2005 Open de Moselle – Doubles =

Doubles
- 2005 Open de Moselle

Final
- Champions: (France) Michaël Llodra (France) Fabrice Santoro
- Runners-up: (Argentina) José Acasuso (Argentina) Sebastián Prieto
- Score: 5–2, 3–5, 5–4^{(7–4)}

Events
Singles	Doubles
← 2004 ·	Open de Moselle	· 2006 →

Arnaud Clément and Nicolas Mahut were the defending champions, but Mahut did not compete this year. Clement teamed up with Thierry Ascione and lost in the first round to José Acasuso and Sebastián Prieto.

Michaël Llodra and Fabrice Santoro won the title by defeating Acasuso and Prieto 5–2, 3–5, 5–4^{(7–4)} in the final. Shortly after the win, Llodra and Santoro announced that they will no longer play as a pair following the end of the season.

== Seeds ==
1. (France) Michaël Llodra / (France) Fabrice Santoro (champions)
2. (Czech Republic) František Čermák / (Czech Republic) Leoš Friedl (semifinals, withdrew due to a lumbago on Čermák)
3. (Czech Republic) Cyril Suk / (Czech Republic) Pavel Vízner (semifinals)
4. (Argentina) José Acasuso / (Argentina) Sebastián Prieto (final)

== Draw ==
=== Key ===
- Q = Qualifier
- WC = Wild card
- LL = Lucky loser
- Alt = Alternate
- SE = Special exempt
- PR = Protected ranking
- ITF = ITF entry
- JE = Junior exempt
- w/o = Walkover
- r = Retired
- d = Defaulted
- SR = Special ranking

=== Draw ===
First round
1	(France) M Llodra (France) F Santoro	5^{7}	5
(Austria) J Knowle (Austria) J Melzer	4^{2}	1
(France) PH Mathieu (France) G Monfils	5^{7}	5
(Morocco) Y El Aynaoui (Spain) Á López Morón	4^{5}	1
3	(Czech Republic) C Suk (Czech Republic) P Vízner	5	5
(Slovakia) K Beck (Germany) M Kohlmann	2	3
(Argentina) JI Chela (Chile) N Massú	w/o
(Romania) R Sabău (Italy) D Sanguinetti
(Slovakia) D Hrbatý (Czech Republic) P Pála	4^{0}	4^{0}
(Argentina) M García (Argentina) M Hood	5^{7}	5^{7}
WC	(France) T Ascione (France) A Clément	3	3
4	(Argentina) J Acasuso (Argentina) S Prieto	5	5
WC	(France) J Boutter (France) O Mutis	2	3
(Croatia) I Ljubičić (Italy) A Seppi	5	5
(Argentina) A Calleri (Romania) A Pavel	2	1
2	(Czech Republic) F Čermák (Czech Republic) L Friedl	5	5

Quarterfinals
1	(France) M Llodra (France) F Santoro	3	5^{9}	5^{7}
(France) PH Mathieu (France) G Monfils	5	4^{7}	4^{3}
3	(Czech Republic) C Suk (Czech Republic) P Vízner	5^{7}	5^{7}
(Argentina) JI Chela (Chile) N Massú	4^{5}	4^{5}
(Argentina) M García (Argentina) M Hood	4^{4}	4^{7}
4	(Argentina) J Acasuso (Argentina) S Prieto	5^{7}	5^{9}
(Croatia) I Ljubičić (Italy) A Seppi	4^{4}	4^{4}
2	(Czech Republic) F Čermák (Czech Republic) L Friedl	5^{7}	5^{7}

Semifinals
1	(France) M Llodra (France) F Santoro	5	5
3	(Czech Republic) C Suk (Czech Republic) P Vízner	0	1
4	(Argentina) J Acasuso (Argentina) S Prieto	w/o
2	(Czech Republic) F Čermák (Czech Republic) L Friedl

Final
1	(France) M Llodra (France) F Santoro	5	3	5^{7}
4	(Argentina) J Acasuso (Argentina) S Prieto	2	5	4^{4}
