= 2000 Grand Prix de Tennis de Lyon =

- Date: 6–13 November 2000
- Edition: 14th
- Category: International Series
- Draw: 32S / 16D
- Prize money: $775,000
- Surface: Carpet / indoor
- Location: Lyon, France
- Venue: Palais des Sports de Gerland

Champions

Singles
- (France) Arnaud Clément

Doubles
- (Netherlands) Paul Haarhuis / (Australia) Sandon Stolle
← 1999 ·	Grand Prix de Tennis de Lyon	· 2001 →

The 2000 Grand Prix de Tennis de Lyon was a men's tennis tournament played on indoor carpet courts at the Palais des Sports de Gerland in Lyon, France, and was part of the International Series of the 2000 ATP Tour. It was the 14th edition of the tournament and was held from 6 November through 13 November 2000. Unseeded Arnaud Clément won the singles title.

== Finals ==
=== Singles ===
(France) Arnaud Clément defeated (Australia) Patrick Rafter 7–6^{(7–2)}, 7–6^{(7–5)}

- It was Clément's first singles title of his career.

=== Doubles ===
(Netherlands) Paul Haarhuis / (Australia) Sandon Stolle defeated (Croatia) Ivan Ljubičić / (United States) Jack Waite 6–1, 6–7, 7–6

- It was Haarhuis' 2nd title of the year and the 51st of his career. It was Stolle's 3rd title of the year and the 16th of his career.
