= 2002 Grand Prix de Tennis de Lyon – Doubles =

Doubles
- 2002 Grand Prix de Tennis de Lyon

Final
- Champions: (Zimbabwe) Wayne Black (Zimbabwe) Kevin Ullyett
- Runners-up: (The Bahamas) Mark Knowles (Canada) Daniel Nestor
- Score: 6–4, 3–6, 7–6^{(7–3)}

Details
- Draw: 16
- Seeds: 4

Events
Singles	Doubles
← 2001 ·	Grand Prix de Tennis de Lyon	· 2003 →

Daniel Nestor and Nenad Zimonjić were the defending champions but they competed with different partners that year, Nestor with Mark Knowles and Zimonjić with Julien Boutter.

Boutter and Zimonjić lost in the semifinals to Wayne Black and Kevin Ullyett.

Knowles and Nestor lost in the final 6–4, 3–6, 7–6^{(7–3)} against Black and Ullyett.

== Seeds ==
1. (The Bahamas) Mark Knowles / (Canada) Daniel Nestor (final)
2. (Zimbabwe) Wayne Black / (Zimbabwe) Kevin Ullyett (champions)
3. (France) Julien Boutter / (Federal Republic of Yugoslavia) Nenad Zimonjić (semifinals)
4. (Australia) Michael Hill / (Germany) David Prinosil (first round)

== Draw ==
=== Key ===
- Q = Qualifier
- WC = Wild card
- LL = Lucky loser
- Alt = Alternate
- SE = Special exempt
- PR = Protected ranking
- ITF = ITF entry
- JE = Junior exempt
- w/o = Walkover
- r = Retired
- d = Defaulted
- SR = Special ranking

First round
1	(The Bahamas) M Knowles (Canada) D Nestor	7	6
(Australia) N Healey (Australia) D Macpherson	5	2
WC	(Brazil) G Kuerten (Brazil) A Sá	6	6
WC	(France) A Clément (France) N Escudé	4	2
4	(Australia) M Hill (Germany) D Prinosil	4	6^{4}
(Morocco) Y El Aynaoui (Croatia) I Ljubičić	6	7^{7}
(United States) J-M Gambill (United States) G Oliver	7^{7}	5	6
(France) M Llodra (France) F Santoro	6^{4}	7	3
(Argentina) G Etlis (United States) J Tarango	3	6^{6}
WC	(France) S Grosjean (France) C Pioline	6	7^{8}
(Austria) J Knowle (Germany) M Kohlmann	3	6	4
3	(France) J Boutter (Federal Republic of Yugoslavia) N Zimonjić	6	4	6
(Australia) W Arthurs (Australia) P Hanley	1	6	7
(South Africa) R Koenig (Australia) A Kratzmann	6	1	5
(Argentina) J Acasuso (Chile) F González	7^{7}	4	4
2	(Zimbabwe) W Black (Zimbabwe) K Ullyett	6^{4}	6	6

Quarterfinals
1	(The Bahamas) M Knowles (Canada) D Nestor	6	6
WC	(Brazil) G Kuerten (Brazil) A Sá	1	4
(Morocco) Y El Aynaoui (Croatia) I Ljubičić
(United States) J-M Gambill (United States) G Oliver	w/o
WC	(France) S Grosjean (France) C Pioline	6	3	4
3	(France) J Boutter (Federal Republic of Yugoslavia) N Zimonjić	4	6	6
(Australia) W Arthurs (Australia) P Hanley	4	4
2	(Zimbabwe) W Black (Zimbabwe) K Ullyett	6	6

Semifinals
1	(The Bahamas) M Knowles (Canada) D Nestor	w/o
(United States) J-M Gambill (United States) G Oliver
3	(France) J Boutter (Federal Republic of Yugoslavia) N Zimonjić	4	2
2	(Zimbabwe) W Black (Zimbabwe) K Ullyett	6	6

Final
1	(The Bahamas) M Knowles (Canada) D Nestor	4	6	6^{3}
2	(Zimbabwe) W Black (Zimbabwe) K Ullyett	6	3	6^{7}
