= 2002 Grand Prix de Tennis de Lyon – Singles =

Singles
- 2002 Grand Prix de Tennis de Lyon

Final
- Champion: (France) Paul-Henri Mathieu
- Runner-up: (Brazil) Gustavo Kuerten
- Score: 4–6, 6–3, 6–1

Events
Singles	Doubles
← 2001 ·	Grand Prix de Tennis de Lyon	· 2003 →

Ivan Ljubičić was the defending champion but lost in the second round to Kristian Pless.

Paul-Henri Mathieu won in the final 4–6, 6–3, 6–1 against Gustavo Kuerten.

== Seeds ==
1. (Russia) Marat Safin (quarterfinals)
2. (Russia) Yevgeny Kafelnikov (second round)
3. (France) Sébastien Grosjean (quarterfinals)
4. (Sweden) Thomas Johansson (second round)
5. (Morocco) Younes El Aynaoui (first round)
6. (Chile) Fernando González (second round)
7. (Belarus) Max Mirnyi (second round)
8. (Croatia) Ivan Ljubičić (second round)

== Draw ==
=== Key ===
- Q = Qualifier
- WC = Wild card
- LL = Lucky loser
- Alt = Alternate
- SE = Special exempt
- PR = Protected ranking
- ITF = ITF entry
- JE = Junior exempt
- w/o = Walkover
- r = Retired
- d = Defaulted
- SR = Special ranking

=== Finals ===
Semifinals
(Brazil) Gustavo Kuerten	6	6^{1}	6
(France) Arnaud Clément	4	7^{7}	3
SE	(France) Paul-Henri Mathieu	6^{5}	7^{7}	6
Q	(Denmark) Kristian Pless	7^{7}	6^{5}	4

Final
(Brazil) Gustavo Kuerten	6	3	1
SE	(France) Paul-Henri Mathieu	4	6	6

=== Top half ===
First round
WC/1	(Russia) M Safin	6	7^{7}
WC	(France) R Gasquet	4	6^{5}
(Australia) W Arthurs	7^{7}	6^{5}	6
(Spain) F Vicente	6^{3}	7^{7}	4
(Romania) A Voinea	4	4
Q	(Switzerland) M Rosset	6	6
(Brazil) G Kuerten	6^{3}	6	6
5	(Morocco) Y El Aynaoui	7^{7}	2	4
3	(France) S Grosjean	6	5	6
WC	(France) C Pioline	1	7	1
SE	(Denmark) K Carlsen	3	7^{7}	1
(Brazil) A Sá	6	6^{4}	6
(France) A Clément	6	6
Q	(France) J Benneteau	4	2
(Argentina) J Acasuso	4	5
6	(Chile) F González	6	7

Second round
WC/1	(Russia) M Safin	6	4	7^{12}
(Australia) W Arthurs	3	6	6^{10}
Q	(Switzerland) M Rosset	6^{5}	6^{5}
(Brazil) G Kuerten	7^{7}	7^{7}
3	(France) S Grosjean	6	6
(Brazil) A Sá	0	1
(France) A Clément	6	6
6	(Chile) F González	4	3

Quarterfinals
WC/1	(Russia) M Safin	5	6	6^{3}
(Brazil) G Kuerten	7	4	7^{7}
3	(France) S Grosjean	3	6^{3}
(France) A Clément	6	7^{7}

Semifinals
(Brazil) G Kuerten	6	6^{1}	6
(France) A Clément	4	7^{7}	3

=== Bottom half ===
First round
7	(Belarus) M Mirnyi	6	7
(Belgium) O Rochus	3	5
(United States) J-M Gambill	2	6^{7}
(Sweden) J Björkman	6	7^{9}
(France) J Boutter	2	5
SE	(France) P-H Mathieu	6	7
(France) F Santoro	7	6^{6}	2
4	(Sweden) T Johansson	5	7^{8}	6
8	(Croatia) I Ljubičić	6	5	7
Q	(France) G Carraz	4	7	5
(Spain) D Sánchez	4	4
Q	(Denmark) K Pless	6	6
(Italy) D Sanguinetti	6^{4}	1
(France) N Escudé	7^{7}	6
(Brazil) F Meligeni	3	4
2	(Russia) Y Kafelnikov	6	6

Second round
7	(Belarus) M Mirnyi	3	4
(Sweden) J Björkman	6	6
SE	(France) P-H Mathieu	7	6^{5}
4	(Sweden) T Johansson	5	7^{7}	r
8	(Croatia) I Ljubičić	6	4	4
Q	(Denmark) K Pless	4	6	6
(France) N Escudé	7^{7}	6
2	(Russia) Y Kafelnikov	6^{5}	4

Quarterfinals
(Sweden) J Björkman	5	4
SE	(France) P-H Mathieu	7	6
Q	(Denmark) K Pless	6	6
(France) N Escudé	3	1

Semifinals
SE	(France) P-H Mathieu	6^{5}	7^{7}	6
Q	(Denmark) K Pless	7^{7}	6^{5}	4
