= 2004 Open de Moselle – Singles =

Singles
- 2004 Open de Moselle

Final
- Champion: (France) Jérôme Haehnel
- Runner-up: (France) Richard Gasquet
- Score: 7–6^{(11–9)}, 6–4

Details
- Draw: 32 (3WC/4Q)
- Seeds: 8

Events
Singles	Doubles
← 2003 ·	Moselle Open	· 2005 →

Arnaud Clément was the defending champion, but lost in the quarterfinals to Jérôme Haehnel.

Haehnel, who entered the tournament as a qualifier, won the title by defeating Richard Gasquet 7–6^{(11–9)}, 6–4 in the final.

== Seeds ==
1. (Croatia) Ivan Ljubičić (quarterfinals)
2. (Belgium) Xavier Malisse (first round, retired)
3. (Argentina) José Acasuso (first round)
4. (Belgium) Olivier Rochus (first round)
5. (Argentina) Juan Mónaco (first round)
6. (France) Julien Benneteau (second round)
7. (Netherlands) Dennis van Scheppingen (first round)
8. (Luxembourg) Gilles Müller (first round)

== Draw ==
=== Key ===
- Q = Qualifier
- WC = Wild card
- LL = Lucky loser
- Alt = Alternate
- SE = Special exempt
- PR = Protected ranking
- ITF = ITF entry
- JE = Junior exempt
- w/o = Walkover
- r = Retired
- d = Defaulted
- SR = Special ranking

=== Finals ===
Semifinals
(France) Paul-Henri Mathieu	7^{7}	6^{4}	6^{1}
Q	(France) Jérôme Haehnel	6^{5}	7^{7}	7^{7}
(United States) Jeff Morrison	1	4
WC	(France) Richard Gasquet	6	6

Final
Q	(France) Jérôme Haehnel	7^{11}	6
WC	(France) Richard Gasquet	6^{9}	4

=== Top half ===
First round
1	(Croatia) I Ljubičić	6	6
(Romania) V Hănescu	4	4
(Netherlands) R Sluiter	6	2
(Chile) A García	4	0^{r}
(Belgium) K Vliegen	4	3
(France) PH Mathieu	6	6
Q	(France) F Serra	6	4	6
5	(Argentina) J Mónaco	4	6	0
3	(Argentina) J Acasuso	3	6^{2}
Q	(France) J Haehnel	6	7^{7}
Q	(France) G Simon	2	6	6^{5}
Q	(France) M Gicquel	6	2	7^{7}
(France) O Mutis	6	2	7^{7}
WC	(France) N Mahut	2	6	6^{1}
(France) A Clément	6	7^{7}
8	(Luxembourg) G Müller	4	6^{3}

Second round
1	(Croatia) I Ljubičić	4	6	7^{7}
(Netherlands) R Sluiter	6	3	6^{4}
(France) PH Mathieu	7^{7}	6
Q	(France) F Serra	6^{5}	1
Q	(France) J Haehnel	6	6
Q	(France) M Gicquel	4	2
(France) O Mutis	6^{4}	1
(France) A Clément	7^{7}	6

Quarterfinals
1	(Croatia) I Ljubičić	6^{4}	4
(France) PH Mathieu	7^{7}	6
Q	(France) J Haehnel	5	6	7
(France) A Clément	7	2	5

Semifinals
(France) PH Mathieu	7^{7}	6^{4}	6^{1}
Q	(France) J Haehnel	6^{5}	7^{7}	7^{7}

=== Bottom half ===
First round
6	(France) J Benneteau	6	6
(United States) JM Gambill	3	1
(United States) J Morrison	6	6
(Belgium) C Rochus	4	3
(Australia) W Arthurs	6^{6}	7^{7}	6^{6}
(France) G Carraz	7^{8}	6^{5}	7^{8}
(Spain) À Corretja	6	2	7
4	(Belgium) O Rochus	3	6	5
7	(Netherlands) D van Scheppingen	3	6^{5}
WC	(France) R Gasquet	6	7^{7}
(France) T Ascione	6	4	6^{3}
(France) A Dupuis	4	6	7^{7}
(France) O Patience	7^{7}	0	6
(Germany) P Kohlschreiber	6^{5}	6	4
WC	(France) G Monfils	3	7^{7}
2	(Belgium) X Malisse	6	6^{4}	r

Second round
6	(France) J Benneteau	4	6	1
(United States) J Morrison	6	4	6
(France) G Carraz	6	6^{5}	4
(Spain) À Corretja	4	7^{7}	6
WC	(France) R Gasquet	6	4	7
(France) A Dupuis	3	6	5
(France) O Patience	4	4
WC	(France) G Monfils	6	6

Quarterfinals
(United States) J Morrison	7	6
(Spain) À Corretja	5	4
WC	(France) R Gasquet	7	6
WC	(France) G Monfils	5	1

Semifinals
(United States) J Morrison	1	4
WC	(France) R Gasquet	6	6
