= 2004 Open de Moselle =

- Date: 11–17 October
- Edition: 2nd
- Category: International Series
- Draw: 32S / 16D
- Prize money: $355,000
- Surface: Hard / indoor
- Location: Metz, France
- Venue: Arènes de Metz

Champions

Singles
- (France) Jérôme Haehnel

Doubles
- (France) Arnaud Clément / (France) Nicolas Mahut
- Open de Moselle

The 2004 Open de Moselle was a men's tennis tournament played on indoor hard courts. It was the second edition of the Open de Moselle, and was part of the International Series of the 2004 ATP Tour. It took place at the Arènes de Metz in Metz, France from 11 October until 17 October 2004. Unseeded Jérôme Haehnel, who entered the main draw as a qualifier, won the singles title.

== Finals ==
=== Singles ===
(France) Jérôme Haehnel defeated (France) Richard Gasquet 7–6^{(11–9)}, 6–4

- It was Haehnel's only main tour singles title of his career.

=== Doubles ===
(France) Arnaud Clément / (France) Nicolas Mahut defeated (Croatia) Ivan Ljubičić / (Italy) Uros Vico 6–2, 7–6^{(10–8)}

- It was Clément's 2nd doubles title of the year and the 4th of his career. It was Mahut's 1st doubles title of the year and the 2nd of his career.
