= 2008 PBZ Zagreb Indoors =

- Date: 23 February – 1 March
- Edition: 6th
- Category: ATP International Series
- Draw: 32S / 16D
- Prize money: $370,000
- Surface: Hard / Indoor
- Location: Zagreb, Croatia
- Venue: Dom Sportova

Champions

Singles
- (Ukraine) Sergiy Stakhovsky

Doubles
- (Australia) Paul Hanley / (Australia) Jordan Kerr
- PBZ Zagreb Indoors

The 2008 PBZ Zagreb Indoors was a tennis tournament played on indoor hard courts. It was the 6th overall edition of the PBZ Zagreb Indoors, and was part of the International Series of the 2008 ATP Tour. It took place at Dom Sportova in Zagreb, Croatia, from 23 February through 1 March 2008.

The singles field was headlined by Doha semifinalist and recent South African Airways Open Challenger titlist Ivan Ljubičić, Rotterdam semifinalist Ivo Karlović, and Marseille quarterfinalist and Rotterdam semifinalist Gilles Simon. Also present in the field were Sydney semifinalist Fabrice Santoro, Chennai semifinalist Mario Ančić, Nicolas Mahut, Andreas Seppi and Janko Tipsarević.

Unseeded Sergiy Stakhovsky win the singles title.

== Notable stories ==
=== Lucky loser wins title ===
Twenty-two-year-old Ukrainian Sergiy Stakhovsky, who entered the tournament as world number 209, became the first lucky loser to reach an ATP Tour final since Nicklas Kulti at Halle in 1999. In winning the title he became the first lucky loser to take a trophy home since Christian Miniussi at São Paulo in 1991, and only the fourth to do it in the history of the ATP Tour.

== Finals ==
=== Singles ===
(Ukraine) Sergiy Stakhovsky defeated (Croatia) Ivan Ljubičić, 7–5, 6–4

- It was Stakhovsky's only singles title of the year and the 1st of his career.

=== Doubles ===
(Australia) Paul Hanley / (Australia) Jordan Kerr defeated (Germany) Christopher Kas / (Netherlands) Rogier Wassen, 6–3, 3–6, [10–8]
