= 2001 Grand Prix de Tennis de Lyon – Singles =

Singles
- 2001 Grand Prix de Tennis de Lyon

Final
- Champion: (Croatia) Ivan Ljubičić
- Runner-up: (Morocco) Younes El Aynaoui
- Score: 6–3, 6–2

Events
Singles	Doubles
← 2000 ·	Grand Prix de Tennis de Lyon	· 2002 →

Arnaud Clément was the defending champion but lost in the second round to Xavier Malisse.

Ivan Ljubičić won in the final 6–3, 6–2 against Younes El Aynaoui.

== Seeds ==
1. (Brazil) Gustavo Kuerten (first round)
2. (Spain) Juan Carlos Ferrero (quarterfinals)
3. (Russia) Marat Safin (semifinals)
4. (France) Sébastien Grosjean (second round)
5. (France) Arnaud Clément (second round)
6. (Sweden) ~~Thomas Johansson~~ (withdrew)
7. (Spain) Albert Portas (first round)
8. (Ecuador) Nicolás Lapentti (second round)
9. (Netherlands) Sjeng Schalken (first round)

== Draw ==
=== Key ===
- Q = Qualifier
- WC = Wild card
- LL = Lucky loser
- Alt = Alternate
- SE = Special exempt
- PR = Protected ranking
- ITF = ITF entry
- JE = Junior exempt
- w/o = Walkover
- r = Retired
- d = Defaulted
- SR = Special ranking

=== Finals ===
Semifinals
(Croatia) Ivan Ljubičić	6^{3}	7^{7}	7^{9}
WC/3	(Russia) Marat Safin	7^{7}	6^{4}	6^{7}
(Belgium) Xavier Malisse	6^{5}	2
(Morocco) Younes El Aynaoui	7^{7}	6

Final
(Croatia) Ivan Ljubičić	6	6
(Morocco) Younes El Aynaoui	3	2

=== Top half ===
First round
1	(Brazil) G Kuerten	6^{1}	2
(Croatia) I Ljubičić	7^{7}	6
Q	(Italy) G Pozzi	3	3
Q	(France) J Benneteau	6	6
(Argentina) G Gaudio	6	7^{7}
(France) A Dupuis	4	6^{4}
(Czech Republic) M Tabara	4	6	6
7	(Spain) A Portas	6	2	2
WC/3	(Russia) M Safin	6	7
(Argentina) F Squillari	4	5
Q	(Israel) N Okun	3	7	7^{10}
(Australia) W Arthurs	6	5	6^{8}
(Belarus) M Mirnyi	4	6	6
(Germany) R Schüttler	6	4	3
(Morocco) H Arazi	2	7	6
9	(Netherlands) S Schalken	6	5	3

Second round
(Croatia) I Ljubičić	7	7
Q	(France) J Benneteau	5	5
(Argentina) G Gaudio	3	7	6
(Czech Republic) M Tabara	6	5	3
WC/3	(Russia) M Safin	6	6
Q	(Israel) N Okun	3	4
(Belarus) M Mirnyi	7^{7}	6
(Morocco) H Arazi	6^{4}	2

Quarterfinals
(Croatia) I Ljubičić	6	6^{5}	6
(Argentina) G Gaudio	3	7^{7}	1
WC/3	(Russia) M Safin	2	6	6
(Belarus) M Mirnyi	6	4	4

Semifinals
(Croatia) I Ljubičić	6^{3}	7^{7}	7^{9}
WC/3	(Russia) M Safin	7^{7}	6^{4}	6^{7}

=== Bottom half ===
First round
5	(France) A Clément	4	6	6
WC	(France) M Llodra	6	3	1
(Belgium) X Malisse	7^{8}	6
SE	(Slovakia) K Kučera	6^{6}	1
Q	(Germany) C Vinck	2	3
(Sweden) J Björkman	6	6
(France) J Boutter	2	4
4	(France) S Grosjean	6	6
8	(Ecuador) N Lapentti	6	6
WC	(France) P-H Mathieu	2	2
(Morocco) Y El Aynaoui	6	6
(Italy) D Sanguinetti	3	2
(Spain) G Blanco	5	3
(Germany) N Kiefer	7	6
(Italy) A Gaudenzi	1	3
2	(Spain) J C Ferrero	6	6

Second round
5	(France) A Clément	5	6	6^{6}
(Belgium) X Malisse	7	3	7^{8}
(Sweden) J Björkman	7^{7}	1	6
4	(France) S Grosjean	6^{2}	6	4
8	(Ecuador) N Lapentti	2	6^{5}
(Morocco) Y El Aynaoui	6	7^{7}
(Germany) N Kiefer	2	2
2	(Spain) J C Ferrero	6	6

Quarterfinals
(Belgium) X Malisse	6	4
(Sweden) J Björkman	1	1^{r}
(Morocco) Y El Aynaoui	6	6
2	(Spain) J C Ferrero	4	4

Semifinals
(Belgium) X Malisse	6^{5}	2
(Morocco) Y El Aynaoui	7^{7}	6
