= 2005 Open de Moselle =

- Date: 3–9 October
- Edition: 3rd
- Category: International Series
- Draw: 32S / 16D
- Prize money: $355,000
- Surface: Hard / indoor
- Location: Metz, France
- Venue: Arènes de Metz

Champions

Singles
- (Croatia) Ivan Ljubičić

Doubles
- (France) Michaël Llodra / (France) Fabrice Santoro
- Open de Moselle

The 2005 Open de Moselle was a men's tennis tournament played on indoor hard courts. It was the third edition of the Open de Moselle, and was part of the International Series of the 2005 ATP Tour. It took place at the Arènes de Metz in Metz, France, from 3 October until 9 October 2005. Third-seeded Ivan Ljubičić won the singles title.

== Finals ==
=== Singles ===
(Croatia) Ivan Ljubičić defeated (France) Gaël Monfils 7–6^{(9–7)}, 6–0

- It was Ljubičić's 1st title of the year, and his 2nd overall.

=== Doubles ===
(France) Michaël Llodra / (France) Fabrice Santoro defeated (Argentina) José Acasuso / (Argentina) Sebastián Prieto 5–2, 3–5, 5–4^{(7–4)}

- It was Llodra's 2nd title of the year, and the 7th of his career. It was Santoro's 2nd title of the year, and the 16th of his career.
