= 2001 Grand Prix de Tennis de Lyon – Doubles =

Doubles
- 2001 Grand Prix de Tennis de Lyon

Final
- Champions: (Canada) Daniel Nestor (Federal Republic of Yugoslavia) Nenad Zimonjić
- Runners-up: (France) Arnaud Clément (France) Sébastien Grosjean
- Score: 6–1, 6–2

Details
- Draw: 16
- Seeds: 4

Events
Singles	Doubles
← 2000 ·	Grand Prix de Tennis de Lyon	· 2002 →

Paul Haarhuis and Sandon Stolle were the defending champions but only Stolle competed that year with Sjeng Schalken.

Schalken and Stolle lost in the first round to Pablo Albano and David Macpherson.

Daniel Nestor and Nenad Zimonjić won in the final 6–1, 6–2 against Arnaud Clément and Sébastien Grosjean.

== Seeds ==
1. (Canada) Daniel Nestor / (Federal Republic of Yugoslavia) Nenad Zimonjić (champions)
2. (Netherlands) Sjeng Schalken / (Australia) Sandon Stolle (first round)
3. (The Bahamas) Mark Knowles / (United States) Brian MacPhie (first round)
4. (United States) Bob Bryan / (United States) Mike Bryan (first round)

== Draw ==
=== Key ===
- Q = Qualifier
- WC = Wild card
- LL = Lucky loser
- Alt = Alternate
- ITF = ITF entry
- PR = Protected ranking
- SR = Special ranking
- SE = Special exempt
- JE = Junior exempt
- JR = Junior Accelerator Programme entrant
- CO = College Accelerator Programme entrant
- NG = Next Gen Accelerator Program entrant
- w/o = Walkover
- r = Retired
- d = Defaulted

First round
1	(Canada) D Nestor (Federal Republic of Yugoslavia) N Zimonjić	6	6
(Argentina) L Arnold (Spain) T Carbonell	3	2
WC	(Morocco) H Arazi (Brazil) G Kuerten	6^{3}	6	7^{7}
WC	(France) M Llodra (France) N Mahut	7^{7}	3	6^{3}
4	(United States) B Bryan (United States) M Bryan	6^{5}	6	3
(Ecuador) N Lapentti (United States) J Tarango	7^{7}	4	6
WC	(Germany) N Kiefer (Russia) M Safin	3	6^{5}
(South Africa) J-L de Jager (South Africa) R Koenig	6	7^{7}
(Russia) A Olhovskiy (Spain) A Portas	1	2
(South Africa) M Barnard (United States) J Thomas	6	6
(Sweden) S Aspelin (Australia) A Kratzmann	6	3	6
3	(The Bahamas) M Knowles (United States) B MacPhie	3	6	4
(Australia) W Arthurs (Australia) M Hill	6	5	6^{5}
WC	(France) A Clément (France) S Grosjean	3	7	7^{7}
(Argentina) P Albano (Australia) D Macpherson	7	7
2	(Netherlands) S Schalken (Australia) S Stolle	5	5

Quarterfinals
1	(Canada) D Nestor (Federal Republic of Yugoslavia) N Zimonjić	7^{7}	6
WC	(Morocco) H Arazi (Brazil) G Kuerten	6^{2}	4
(Ecuador) N Lapentti (United States) J Tarango	6	6
(South Africa) J-L de Jager (South Africa) R Koenig	3	4
(South Africa) M Barnard (United States) J Thomas	7^{7}	6
(Sweden) S Aspelin (Australia) A Kratzmann	6^{5}	4
WC	(France) A Clément (France) S Grosjean	6	6
(Argentina) P Albano (Australia) D Macpherson	3	4

Semifinals
1	(Canada) D Nestor (Federal Republic of Yugoslavia) N Zimonjić	6	7^{7}
(Ecuador) N Lapentti (United States) J Tarango	1	6^{1}
(South Africa) M Barnard (United States) J Thomas	2	2
WC	(France) A Clément (France) S Grosjean	6	6

Final
1	(Canada) D Nestor (Federal Republic of Yugoslavia) N Zimonjić	6	6
WC	(France) A Clément (France) S Grosjean	1	2
