= 2005 Open de Moselle – Singles =

Singles
- 2005 Open de Moselle

Final
- Champion: (Croatia) Ivan Ljubičić
- Runner-up: (France) Gaël Monfils
- Score: 7–6^{(9–7)}, 6–0

Details
- Draw: 32
- Seeds: 8

Events
Singles	Doubles
← 2004 ·	Open de Moselle	· 2006 →

Jérôme Haehnel was the defending champion, but did not participate.

Ivan Ljubičić won the title, defeating Gaël Monfils 7–6^{(9–7)}, 6–0 in the final.

== Seeds ==
1. (Russia) Nikolay Davydenko (semifinals)
2. (France) Richard Gasquet (quarterfinals)
3. (Croatia) Ivan Ljubičić (champion)
4. (Slovakia) Dominik Hrbatý (semifinals)
5. (Sweden) Robin Söderling (quarterfinals)
6. (France) Gaël Monfils (final)
7. (Italy) Davide Sanguinetti (first round)
8. (Chile) Nicolás Massú (first round)

== Draw ==
=== Key ===
- Q = Qualifier
- WC = Wild card
- LL = Lucky loser
- Alt = Alternate
- SE = Special exempt
- PR = Protected ranking
- ITF = ITF entry
- JE = Junior exempt
- w/o = Walkover
- r = Retired
- d = Defaulted
- SR = Special ranking

=== Finals ===
Semifinals
1	(Russia) Nikolay Davydenko	1	4
3	(Croatia) Ivan Ljubičić	6	6
4	(Slovakia) Dominik Hrbatý	6^{1}	6	2
6	(France) Gaël Monfils	7^{7}	1	6

Final
3	(Croatia) Ivan Ljubičić	7^{9}	6
6	(France) Gaël Monfils	6^{7}	0

=== Top half ===
First round
1	(Russia) N Davydenko	6	6
(Brazil) R Mello	3	1
(France) M Llodra	6	6
Q	(France) G Simon	4	0
(Romania) R Sabău	5	3
(Italy) A Seppi	7	6
(Romania) A Pavel	6^{5}	6	6
7	(Italy) D Sanguinetti	7^{7}	3	3
3	(Croatia) I Ljubičić	7^{7}	6
(Argentina) J Acasuso	6^{2}	3
(France) F Santoro	4	6	6
(Austria) J Melzer	6	3	2
Q	(Russia) Y Schukin	4	6^{4}
Q	(Australia) P Luczak	6	7^{7}
(Czech Republic) T Zíb	6^{5}	4
5	(Sweden) R Söderling	7^{7}	6

Second round
1	(Russia) N Davydenko	6	6
(France) M Llodra	4	4
(Italy) A Seppi	7	7^{7}
(Romania) A Pavel	5	6^{2}
3	(Croatia) I Ljubičić	4	6	7^{7}
(France) F Santoro	6	1	6^{3}
Q	(Australia) P Luczak	6^{4}	3
5	(Sweden) R Söderling	7^{7}	6

Quarterfinals
1	(Russia) N Davydenko	6	6
(Italy) A Seppi	3	1
3	(Croatia) I Ljubičić	6^{6}	6	6
5	(Sweden) R Söderling	7^{8}	3	4

Semifinals
1	(Russia) N Davydenko	1	4
3	(Croatia) I Ljubičić	6	6

=== Bottom half ===
First round
8	(Chile) N Massú	5	5
(Argentina) A Calleri	7	7
WC	(Australia) M Philippoussis	6	3	6
SE	(Germany) T Behrend	1	6	3
(Morocco) Y El Aynaoui	6	5	1
(Germany) F Mayer	4	7	6
WC	(France) T Ascione	3	4
4	(Slovakia) D Hrbatý	6	6
6	(France) G Monfils	2	6	7^{7}
(Argentina) JI Chela	6	1	6^{4}
WC	(France) A Clément	7^{7}	6
Q	(Germany) T Summerer	6^{3}	4
(Russia) I Andreev	6^{5}	4
(France) P-H Mathieu	7^{7}	6
(Slovakia) K Beck	4	2
2	(France) R Gasquet	6	6

Second round
(Argentina) A Calleri	6^{8}	4
WC	(Australia) M Philippoussis	7^{10}	6
(Germany) F Mayer	6^{5}	1
4	(Slovakia) D Hrbatý	7^{7}	6
6	(France) G Monfils	6	6
WC	(France) A Clément	2	2
(France) P-H Mathieu	2	2
2	(France) R Gasquet	6	6

Quarterfinals
WC	(Australia) M Philippoussis	4	6	1
4	(Slovakia) D Hrbatý	6	4	6
6	(France) G Monfils	7^{7}	6
2	(France) R Gasquet	6^{3}	2

Semifinals
4	(Slovakia) D Hrbatý	6^{1}	6	2
6	(France) G Monfils	7^{7}	1	6
