= 2008 PBZ Zagreb Indoors – Singles =

Singles
- 2008 PBZ Zagreb Indoors

Final
- Champion: (Ukraine) Sergiy Stakhovsky
- Runner-up: (Croatia) Ivan Ljubičić
- Score: 7–5, 6–4

Details
- Draw: 32 (4Q / 3WC)
- Seeds: 8

Events
Singles	Doubles
- PBZ Zagreb Indoors

Marcos Baghdatis was the defending champion, but chose not to participate that year.

Sergiy Stakhovsky won in the final 7–5, 6–4, against Ivan Ljubičić.

== Seeds ==
1. (Croatia) Ivan Ljubičić (final)
2. (Croatia) Ivo Karlović (first round)
3. (France) Gilles Simon (second round)
4. (France) Fabrice Santoro (first round, retired due to an elbow injury)
5. (Croatia) Marin Čilić (second round)
6. (France) Nicolas Mahut (first round)
7. (Italy) Andreas Seppi (first round)
8. (Serbia) Janko Tipsarević (quarterfinals)

== Draw ==
Key

- Q = Qualifier
- WC = Wild card
- LL = Lucky loser
- Alt = Alternate
- ITF = ITF entry
- PR = Protected ranking
- SR = Special ranking
- SE = Special exempt
- JE = Junior exempt
- JR = Junior Accelerator Programme entrant
- CO = College Accelerator Programme entrant
- NG = Next Gen Accelerator Program entrant
- w/o = Walkover
- r = Retired
- d = Defaulted

=== Finals ===
Semifinals
1	(Croatia) Ivan Ljubičić	7^{7}	6
(Croatia) Mario Ančić	6^{2}	4
(Italy) Simone Bolelli	4	4
LL	(Ukraine) Sergiy Stakhovsky	6	6

Final
1	(Croatia) Ivan Ljubičić	5	4
LL	(Ukraine) Sergiy Stakhovsky	7	6

=== Top half ===
First round
1	(Croatia) I Ljubičić	6	7^{9}
(Latvia) E Gulbis	3	6^{7}
(Croatia) L Zovko	6	7
(France) M Gicquel	3	5
(Russia) T Gabashvili	7^{8}	6
(Germany) F Mayer	6^{6}	0
(South Africa) R de Voest	6	7^{7}
7	(Italy) A Seppi	4	6^{3}
3	(France) G Simon	7^{7}	6
Q	(Slovakia) P Červenák	6^{2}	1
(Germany) M Berrer	4	3
(Netherlands) R Haase	6	6
(Germany) D Gremelmayr	6^{2}	6	6
Q	(France) S de Chaunac	7^{7}	1	4
(Croatia) M Ančić	7^{7}	7^{8}
6	(France) N Mahut	6^{3}	6^{6}

Second round
1	(Croatia) I Ljubičić	6	7^{7}
(Croatia) L Zovko	4	6^{3}
(Russia) T Gabashvili	7	6
(South Africa) R de Voest	5	1
3	(France) G Simon	2	4
(Netherlands) R Haase	6	6
(Germany) D Gremelmayr	3	2
(Croatia) M Ančić	6	6

Quarterfinals
1	(Croatia) I Ljubičić	6	6^{5}	6
(Russia) T Gabashvili	2	7^{7}	3
(Netherlands) R Haase	3	6	3
(Croatia) M Ančić	6	3	6

Semifinals
1	(Croatia) I Ljubičić	7^{7}	6
(Croatia) M Ančić	6^{2}	4

=== Bottom half ===
First round
5	(Croatia) M Čilić	6	6
(Spain) G García López	2	2
(Germany) R Schüttler	3	2
(Italy) S Bolelli	6	6
WC	(Croatia) F Škugor	6	6^{2}	0
(Austria) S Koubek	2	7^{7}	6
(Belgium) O Rochus	6	2
4	(France) F Santoro	3	0^{r}
8	(Serbia) J Tipsarević	6	6
(Germany) M Zverev	3	1
WC	(Croatia) R Karanušić	6^{9}	6	6
Q	(Slovenia) B Kavčič	7^{11}	4	4
(Serbia) V Troicki	6	7^{7}
Q	(Switzerland) G Bastl	3	6^{3}
LL	(Ukraine) S Stakhovsky	4	7^{7}	6
2	(Croatia) I Karlović	6	6^{5}	2

Second round
5	(Croatia) M Čilić	4	3
(Italy) S Bolelli	6	6
(Austria) S Koubek	2	4
(Belgium) O Rochus	6	6
8	(Serbia) J Tipsarević	6	6^{4}	6
WC	(Croatia) R Karanušić	3	7^{7}	4
(Serbia) V Troicki	6^{7}	6	4
LL	(Ukraine) S Stakhovsky	7^{9}	3	6

Quarterfinals
(Italy) S Bolelli	7^{7}	6
(Belgium) O Rochus	6^{5}	4
8	(Serbia) J Tipsarević	6	4	2
LL	(Ukraine) S Stakhovsky	3	6	6

Semifinals
(Italy) S Bolelli	4	4
LL	(Ukraine) S Stakhovsky	6	6

== Qualifying ==
=== Seeds ===
1. (Czech Republic) Jan Hernych (second round)
2. (Ukraine) Sergiy Stakhovsky (qualifying competition, lucky loser)
3. (Slovakia) Ivo Klec (first round)
4. (Serbia) Ilija Bozoljac (qualifying competition)
5. (Slovenia) Marko Tkalec (qualifying competition)
6. (Croatia) Ivan Dodig (qualifying competition)
7. (Poland) Dawid Olejniczak (first round)
8. (France) Sébastien de Chaunac (qualified)

=== Qualifiers ===
1. (Switzerland) George Bastl
2. (Slovenia) Blaž Kavčič
3. (Slovakia) Pavol Červenák
4. (France) Sébastien de Chaunac

=== Lucky loser ===
1. (Ukraine) Sergiy Stakhovsky

=== Draw ===
==== First qualifier ====
First round
1	(Czech Republic) Jan Hernych	7^{7}	4	6
(Croatia) Nikola Mektić	6^{5}	6	4
(Czech Republic) Jaroslav Pospíšil	0	3
(Switzerland) George Bastl	6	6
(Canada) Pierre-Ludovic Duclos	6	6
(Croatia) Vjekoslav Skenderović	3	2
(Netherlands) Nick van der Meer	4	3
5	(Slovenia) Marko Tkalec	6	6

Second round
1	(Czech Republic) Jan Hernych	4	6	2
(Switzerland) George Bastl	6	3	6
(Canada) Pierre-Ludovic Duclos	6	6^{3}	2
5	(Slovenia) Marko Tkalec	3	7^{7}	6

Qualifying competition
(Switzerland) George Bastl	6	6
5	(Slovenia) Marko Tkalec	4	2

==== Second qualifier ====
First round
2	(Ukraine) Sergiy Stakhovsky	6	1
(Italy) Massimo Dell'Acqua	1	0^{r}
(Croatia) Joško Topić	2	3
(Italy) Luca Vanni	6	6
(Slovenia) Blaž Kavčič	6	6
WC	(Croatia) Antonio Šančić	2	0
WC	(Croatia) Ante Pavić	6	4	6
7	(Poland) Dawid Olejniczak	4	6	3

Second round
2	(Ukraine) Sergiy Stakhovsky	6	7^{7}
(Italy) Luca Vanni	1	6^{5}
(Slovenia) Blaž Kavčič	6	6
WC	(Croatia) Ante Pavić	2	1

Qualifying competition
2	(Ukraine) Sergiy Stakhovsky	6	1	3
(Slovenia) Blaž Kavčič	2	6	6

==== Third qualifier ====
First round
3	(Slovakia) Ivo Klec	6	3	2
(Croatia) Saša Tuksar	2	6	6
(Russia) Denis Matsukevich	1	1
(Slovakia) Pavol Červenák	6	6
(Croatia) Antonio Veić	6	1	6
(Croatia) Nikola Martinović	3	6	1
(Italy) Uros Vico	3	4
6	(Croatia) Ivan Dodig	6	6

Second round
(Croatia) Saša Tuksar	4	7	6^{4}
(Slovakia) Pavol Červenák	6	5	7^{7}
(Croatia) Antonio Veić	3	5
6	(Croatia) Ivan Dodig	6	7

Qualifying competition
(Slovakia) Pavol Červenák	7^{7}	6^{5}	6
6	(Croatia) Ivan Dodig	6^{2}	7^{7}	2

==== Fourth qualifier ====
First round
4	(Serbia) Ilija Bozoljac	6	6
(Finland) Timo Nieminen	4	2
(Netherlands) Thomas Schoorel	6^{4}	4
(Czech Republic) Tomáš Cakl	7^{7}	6
(Slovenia) Grega Žemlja	2	3
WC	(Croatia) Deni Žmak	6	6
WC	(Croatia) Vilim Višak	1	0
8	(France) Sébastien de Chaunac	6	6

Second round
4	(Serbia) Ilija Bozoljac	6	6
(Czech Republic) Tomáš Cakl	3	4
WC	(Croatia) Deni Žmak	2	2
8	(France) Sébastien de Chaunac	6	6

Qualifying competition
4	(Serbia) Ilija Bozoljac	1	7	1
8	(France) Sébastien de Chaunac	6	5	6
