= 2000 Grand Prix de Tennis de Lyon – Doubles =

Doubles
- 2000 Grand Prix de Tennis de Lyon

Final
- Champions: (Netherlands) Paul Haarhuis (Australia) Sandon Stolle
- Runners-up: (Croatia) Ivan Ljubičić (United States) Jack Waite
- Score: 6–1, 6–7^{(2–7)}, 7–6^{(9–7)}

Details
- Draw: 16
- Seeds: 4

Events
| Singles | Doubles |
| ← 1999 · | Grand Prix de Tennis de Lyon | · 2001 → |

Piet Norval and Kevin Ullyett were the defending champions, but did not participate this year.

Paul Haarhuis and Sandon Stolle won in the final 6–1, 6–7^{(2–7)}, 7–6^{(9–7)}, against Ivan Ljubičić and Jack Waite.

== Seeds ==
1. (Netherlands) Paul Haarhuis / (Australia) Sandon Stolle
2. (Switzerland) Roger Federer / (South Africa) Wayne Ferreira
3. (Australia) Joshua Eagle / (Australia) Andrew Florent
4. (Spain) Tomás Carbonell / (Argentina) Martín García

== Draw ==
=== Key ===
- Q = Qualifier
- WC = Wild card
- LL = Lucky loser
- Alt = Alternate
- ITF = ITF entry
- PR = Protected ranking
- SR = Special ranking
- SE = Special exempt
- JE = Junior exempt
- JR = Junior Accelerator Programme entrant
- CO = College Accelerator Programme entrant
- NG = Next Gen Accelerator Program entrant
- w/o = Walkover
- r = Retired
- d = Defaulted

=== Draw ===
First round
1 | (Netherlands) P Haarhuis (Australia) S Stolle | 7 | 6
WC | (Brazil) G Kuerten (France) C Pioline | 5 | 4
(Italy) A Gaudenzi (Italy) D Nargiso | 6 | 6
(Zimbabwe) B Black (United States) S Humphries | 3 | 3
3 | (Australia) J Eagle (Australia) A Florent | 3 | 7^{7} | 3
WC | (France) N Escudé (France) M Llodra | 6 | 6^{2} | 6
(Australia) M Hill (United States) J Tarango | 6 | 3 | 6
(France) J Boutter (France) F Santoro | 1 | 6 | 3
(Australia) P Tramacchi (Belgium) T Vanhoudt | 3 | 5
(India) M Bhupathi (Socialist Federal Republic of Yugoslavia) N Zimonjić | 6 | 7
WC | (France) A Clément (France) S Grosjean | 7^{7} | 4 | 6
4 | (Spain) T Carbonell (Argentina) M García | 6^{2} | 6 | 1
(Australia) P Rafter (Australia) M Woodforde | 6 | 0 | 3
Q | (Croatia) I Ljubičić (United States) J Waite | 4 | 6 | 6
(Argentina) P Albano (Brazil) J Oncins | 2 | 6^{8}
2 | (Switzerland) R Federer (South Africa) W Ferreira | 6 | 7^{10}

Quarterfinals
1 | (Netherlands) P Haarhuis (Australia) S Stolle | 4 | 6 | 7
(Italy) A Gaudenzi (Italy) D Nargiso | 6 | 3 | 5
WC | (France) N Escudé (France) M Llodra | 6 | 1 | 6^{3}
(Australia) M Hill (United States) J Tarango | 4 | 6 | 7^{7}
(India) M Bhupathi (Socialist Federal Republic of Yugoslavia) N Zimonjić | w/o
WC | (France) A Clément (France) S Grosjean
Q | (Croatia) I Ljubičić (United States) J Waite | 7 | 6
2 | (Switzerland) R Federer (South Africa) W Ferreira | 5 | 4

Semifinals
1 | (Netherlands) P Haarhuis (Australia) S Stolle | 6 | 6
(Australia) M Hill (United States) J Tarango | 3 | 2
(India) M Bhupathi (Socialist Federal Republic of Yugoslavia) N Zimonjić | 6^{1} | 6 | 4
Q | (Croatia) I Ljubičić (United States) J Waite | 7^{7} | 4 | 6

Final
1 | (Netherlands) P Haarhuis (Australia) S Stolle | 6 | 6^{2} | 7^{9}
Q | (Croatia) I Ljubičić (United States) J Waite | 1 | 7^{7} | 6^{7}
