= 2008 PBZ Zagreb Indoors – Doubles =

Doubles
- 2008 PBZ Zagreb Indoors

Final
- Champions: (Australia) Paul Hanley (Australia) Jordan Kerr
- Runners-up: (Germany) Christopher Kas (Netherlands) Rogier Wassen
- Score: 6–3, 3–6, [10–8]

Details
- Draw: 16
- Seeds: 4

Events
Singles	Doubles
- PBZ Zagreb Indoors

Michael Kohlmann and Alexander Waske were the defending champions, but chose not to participate that year.

Paul Hanley and Jordan Kerr won in the final 6–3, 3–6, [10–8], against Christopher Kas and Rogier Wassen.

== Seeds ==
1. (Australia) Paul Hanley / (Australia) Jordan Kerr (champions)
2. (Germany) Christopher Kas / (Netherlands) Rogier Wassen (final)
3. (Czech Republic) Jaroslav Levinský / (Czech Republic) David Škoch (first round)
4. (Switzerland) Yves Allegro / (Austria) Alexander Peya (semifinals)

== Draw ==
Key

- Q = Qualifier
- WC = Wild card
- LL = Lucky loser
- Alt = Alternate
- ITF = ITF entry
- PR = Protected ranking
- SR = Special ranking
- SE = Special exempt
- JE = Junior exempt
- JR = Junior Accelerator Programme entrant
- CO = College Accelerator Programme entrant
- NG = Next Gen Accelerator Program entrant
- w/o = Walkover
- r = Retired
- d = Defaulted

=== Draw ===
First round
1	(Australia) P Hanley (Australia) J Kerr	6^{4}	6	[10]
(Serbia) J Tipsarević (Serbia) V Troicki	7^{7}	2	[6]
(Germany) M Berrer (Germany) F Mayer	7^{7}	4	[10]
(Italy) S Bolelli (Italy) A Seppi	6^{4}	6	[4]
3	(Czech Republic) J Levinský (Czech Republic) D Škoch	4	3
(United States) J Cerretani (Slovakia) F Polášek	6	6
(South Africa) R de Voest (United Kingdom) R Hutchins	6	6
WC	(Croatia) I Dodig (Croatia) F Škugor	4	4
(Croatia) I Karlović (Croatia) L Zovko	6^{4}	6	[10]
WC	(Croatia) N Mektic (Croatia) I Zovko	7^{7}	4	[8]
(United Kingdom) J Auckland (Germany) D Gremelmayr	7^{7}	1	[4]
4	(Switzerland) Y Allegro (Austria) A Peya	6^{4}	6	[10]
ALT	(Netherlands) J Smit (Netherlands) M van Haasteren	6^{9}	7	[10]
(Russia) T Gabashvili (Spain) G García López	7^{11}	5	[4]
(Czech Republic) T Cibulec (Czech Republic) P Pála	4	4
2	(Germany) C Kas (Netherlands) R Wassen	6	6

Quarterfinals
1	(Australia) P Hanley (Australia) J Kerr	6	6
(Germany) M Berrer (Germany) F Mayer	3	2
(United States) J Cerretani (Slovakia) F Polášek	7	7^{7}
(South Africa) R de Voest (United Kingdom) R Hutchins	5	6^{1}
(Croatia) I Karlović (Croatia) L Zovko	4	3
4	(Switzerland) Y Allegro (Austria) A Peya	6	6
ALT	(Netherlands) J Smit (Netherlands) M van Haasteren	4	6^{3}
2	(Germany) C Kas (Netherlands) R Wassen	6	7^{7}

Semifinals
1	(Australia) P Hanley (Australia) J Kerr	6	6
(United States) J Cerretani (Slovakia) F Polášek	3	2
4	(Switzerland) Y Allegro (Austria) A Peya	3	4
2	(Germany) C Kas (Netherlands) R Wassen	6	6

Final
1	(Australia) P Hanley (Australia) J Kerr	6	3	[10]
2	(Germany) C Kas (Netherlands) R Wassen	3	6	[8]
