= 2000 Grand Prix de Tennis de Lyon – Singles =

Singles
- 2000 Grand Prix de Tennis de Lyon

Final
- Champion: (France) Arnaud Clément
- Runner-up: (Australia) Patrick Rafter
- Score: 7–6^{(7–2)}, 7–6^{(7–5)}

Events
Singles	Doubles
← 1999 ·	Grand Prix de Tennis de Lyon	· 2001 →

Nicolás Lapentti was the defending champion, but did not participate this year.

Arnaud Clément won the tournament, beating Patrick Rafter 7–6^{(7–2)}, 7–6^{(7–5)} in the final.

== Seeds ==
1. (Brazil) Gustavo Kuerten (quarterfinals)
2. (United States) Andre Agassi (semifinals, retired)
3. (Sweden) Thomas Enqvist (quarterfinals)
4. (Spain) Àlex Corretja (first round)
5. (Argentina) Franco Squillari (second round)
6. (Australia) Mark Philippoussis (second round)
7. (France) Cédric Pioline (first round)
8. (Australia) Patrick Rafter (final)

== Draw ==
=== Key ===
- Q = Qualifier
- WC = Wild card
- LL = Lucky loser
- Alt = Alternate
- SE = Special exempt
- PR = Protected ranking
- ITF = ITF entry
- JE = Junior exempt
- w/o = Walkover
- r = Retired
- d = Defaulted
- SR = Special ranking

=== Finals ===
Semifinals
8	(Australia) Patrick Rafter	6	6
(Morocco) Hicham Arazi	3	4
(France) Arnaud Clément	6
2	(United States) Andre Agassi	3^{r}

Final
8	(Australia) Patrick Rafter	6^{2}	6^{5}
(France) Arnaud Clément	7^{7}	7^{7}

=== Top half ===
First round
1	(Brazil) G Kuerten	7^{7}	6
(Romania) A Pavel	6^{5}	4
(Spain) A Costa	6^{6}	6	3
WC	(France) M Llodra	7^{8}	1	6
(Morocco) Y El Aynaoui	7^{7}	7^{7}
(Australia) A Ilie	6^{5}	6^{4}
(Argentina) G Gaudio	4	6	4
8	(Australia) P Rafter	6	4	6
3	(Sweden) T Enqvist	4	6	6
(France) S Grosjean	6	3	4
Q	(France) J-F Bachelot	5	7^{7}	6
(Morocco) K Alami	7	6^{1}	4
WC	(France) J Boutter	3	6	4
(Morocco) H Arazi	6	3	6
(South Africa) W Ferreira	3	7^{12}	3
6	(Australia) M Philippoussis	6	6^{10}	6

Second round
1	(Brazil) G Kuerten	7	7^{7}
WC	(France) M Llodra	5	6^{4}
(Morocco) Y El Aynaoui	6^{4}	2
8	(Australia) P Rafter	7^{7}	6
3	(Sweden) T Enqvist	6	6^{3}	6
Q	(France) J-F Bachelot	3	7^{7}	3
(Morocco) H Arazi	6	3	7
6	(Australia) M Philippoussis	3	6	5

Quarterfinals
1	(Brazil) G Kuerten	3	4
8	(Australia) P Rafter	6	6
3	(Sweden) T Enqvist	7^{8}	6^{6}	4
(Morocco) H Arazi	6^{6}	7^{8}	6

Semifinals
8	(Australia) P Rafter	6	6
(Morocco) H Arazi	3	4

=== Bottom half ===
First round
5	(Argentina) F Squillari	6	4	6
(France) F Santoro	2	6	1
(France) A Clément	7	4	6
Q	(France) T Guardiola	5	6	1
(Argentina) M Puerta	7^{7}	6
(United States) M Chang	6^{4}	4
Q	(Netherlands) R Sluiter	6	7^{7}
4	(Spain) À Corretja	4	6^{2}
7	(France) C Pioline	4	6^{5}
(Slovakia) K Kučera	6	7^{7}
(Switzerland) R Federer	6	7^{7}
(France) N Escudé	3	6^{3}
(Germany) T Haas	6	6
WC	(France) A Di Pasquale	3	3
Q	(Armenia) S Sargsian	7^{7}	1	4
2	(United States) A Agassi	6^{3}	6	6

Second round
5	(Argentina) F Squillari	6	2	3
(France) A Clément	3	6	6
(Argentina) M Puerta	6	4	1^{r}
Q	(Netherlands) R Sluiter	4	6	4
(Slovakia) K Kučera	3	6	6
(Switzerland) R Federer	6	2	1
(Germany) T Haas	2	3
2	(United States) A Agassi	6	6

Quarterfinals
(France) A Clément	6	3	7^{7}
Q	(Netherlands) R Sluiter	3	6	6^{5}
(Slovakia) K Kučera	1	5
2	(United States) A Agassi	6	7

Semifinals
(France) A Clément	6
2	(United States) A Agassi	3^{r}
