= 2002 Grand Prix de Tennis de Lyon =

- Date: 7–13 October 2002
- Edition: 16th
- Category: International Series
- Draw: 32S / 16D
- Prize money: $735,000
- Surface: Carpet / indoor
- Location: Lyon, France
- Venue: Palais des Sports de Gerland

Champions

Singles
- (France) Paul-Henri Mathieu

Doubles
- (Zimbabwe) Wayne Black / (Zimbabwe) Kevin Ullyett
- Grand Prix de Tennis de Lyon

The 2002 Grand Prix de Tennis de Lyon was a men's tennis tournament played on indoor carpet courts at the Palais des Sports de Gerland in Lyon in France and was part of the International Series of the 2002 ATP Tour. It was the 16th edition of the tournament and took place from 7 October through 13 October 2002. Unseeded Paul-Henri Mathieu, who entered the tournament on a special exempt, won the singles title.

== Finals ==
=== Singles ===
(France) Paul-Henri Mathieu defeated (Brazil) Gustavo Kuerten 4–6, 6–3, 6–1

- It was Mathieu's 2nd title of the year and the 2nd of his career.

=== Doubles ===
(Zimbabwe) Wayne Black / (Zimbabwe) Kevin Ullyett defeated (The Bahamas) Mark Knowles / (Canada) Daniel Nestor 6–4, 3–6, 7–6^{(7–3)}

- It was Black's 5th title of the year and the 12th of his career. It was Ullyett's 5th title of the year and the 18th of his career.
