= 2004 Open de Moselle – Doubles =

Doubles
- 2004 Open de Moselle

Final
- Champions: (France) Arnaud Clément (France) Nicolas Mahut
- Runners-up: (Croatia) Ivan Ljubičić (Italy) Uros Vico
- Score: 6–2, 7–6^{(10–8)}

Details
- Draw: 16 (2WC)
- Seeds: 4

Events
Singles	Doubles
- Moselle Open

Julien Benneteau and Nicolas Mahut were the defending champions, but Benneteau did not compete this year.

Mahut teamed up with Arnaud Clément and successfully defended his title, by defeating Ivan Ljubičić and Uros Vico 6–2, 7–6^{(10–8)} in the final.

== Seeds ==
1. (Belgium) Xavier Malisse / (Belgium) Olivier Rochus (first round, withdrew)
2. (France) Arnaud Clément / (France) Nicolas Mahut (champions)
3. (South Africa) Robbie Koenig / (United States) Travis Parrott (first round)
4. (Czech Republic) Tomáš Cibulec / (Czech Republic) David Škoch (quarterfinals)

== Draw ==
Key

- Q = Qualifier
- WC = Wild card
- LL = Lucky loser
- Alt = Alternate
- ITF = ITF entry
- PR = Protected ranking
- SR = Special ranking
- SE = Special exempt
- JE = Junior exempt
- JR = Junior Accelerator Programme entrant
- CO = College Accelerator Programme entrant
- NG = Next Gen Accelerator Program entrant
- w/o = Walkover
- r = Retired
- d = Defaulted

=== Draw ===
First round
1	(Belgium) X Malisse (Belgium) O Rochus
(Germany) L Burgsmüller (Sweden) R Lindstedt	w/o
(Germany) K Braasch (South Africa) J Coetzee	6^{2}	4
WC	(France) O Mutis (France) O Patience	7^{7}	6
4	(Czech Republic) T Cibulec (Czech Republic) D Škoch	6^{5}	7^{7}	6
WC	(France) T Ascione (France) A Dupuis	7^{7}	6^{5}	0
(Croatia) I Ljubičić (Italy) U Vico	6	6
(United States) S Hunphries (Netherlands) R Sluiter	4	4
(Argentina) J Acasuso (Chile) A García
(United States) JM Gambill (United States) J Morrison	w/o
(Australia) A Fisher (The Bahamas) M Merklein	6	6
3	(South Africa) R Koenig (United States) T Parrott	3	4
(Sweden) J Landsberg (United States) T Phillips	1	6	3
(Spain) À Corretja (Spain) Á López Morón	6	2	6
(Italy) M Bertolini (Belgium) T Vanhoudt	3	6^{2}
2	(France) A Clément (France) N Mahut	6	7^{7}

Quarterfinals
(Germany) L Burgsmüller (Sweden) R Lindstedt	6	7^{7}
WC	(France) O Mutis (France) O Patience	2	6^{3}
4	(Czech Republic) T Cibulec (Czech Republic) D Škoch	6	5	5
(Croatia) I Ljubičić (Italy) U Vico	3	7	7
(United States) JM Gambill (United States) J Morrison	4	6	4
(Australia) A Fisher (The Bahamas) M Merklein	6	4	6
(Spain) À Corretja (Spain) Á López Morón	2	2
2	(France) A Clément (France) N Mahut	6	6

Semifinals
(Germany) L Burgsmüller (Sweden) R Lindstedt	7^{7}	4	6^{5}
(Croatia) I Ljubičić (Italy) U Vico	6^{5}	6	7^{7}
(Australia) A Fisher (The Bahamas) M Merklein	6	3	6^{4}
2	(France) A Clément (France) N Mahut	3	6	7^{7}

Final
(Croatia) I Ljubičić (Italy) U Vico	2	6^{8}
2	(France) A Clément (France) N Mahut	6	7^{10}
