= Uros Vico =

Croatian-born Italian tennis player

- Country (sports): Italy
- Residence: Rome, Italy
- Born: 19 February 1981 (age 44); Split, SR Croatia, SFR Yugoslavia
- Height: 1.87 m (6 ft 2 in)
- Turned pro: 1998
- Retired: 2013
- Plays: Right-handed
- Prize money: $309,892

Singles
- Career record: 2–5
- Career titles: 0; 2 Challenger, 5 Futures
- Highest ranking: No. 166 (26 July 2004)

Grand Slam singles results
- Australian Open: Q2 (2006)
- French Open: Q1 (2004, 2005, 2006)
- Wimbledon: Q3 (2005)
- US Open: Q3 (2004)

Doubles
- Career record: 10–16
- Career titles: 0; 8 Challenger, 7 Futures
- Highest ranking: No. 80 (8 August 2005)

Grand Slam doubles results
- Australian Open: 2R (2005)
- French Open: 3R (2006)
- Wimbledon: 1R (2005, 2006)
- US Open: 1R (2006)
- Last updated on: 2 Jun 2021.

Uros Vico (Croatian: Uroš Vico, pronounced [ǔroʃ ʋǐːtso]; born 19 February 1981) is a Croatian-born Italian retired tennis player.

Vico had a career high ATP Tour singles ranking of World No.166, achieved on 26 July 2004. He also had a career high ATP Tour doubles ranking of World No. 80, achieved on 8 August 2005.

Vico reached 14 career singles finals with a record of 7 wins and 7 losses, which includes a 2–1 record in ATP Challenger Tour finals. Additionally, he reached 32 career doubles finals with a record of 15 wins and 17 losses, including having an 8–10 record in ATP Challenger Tour finals. In 2004, he would reach his sole final on the ATP Tour, in doubles at the 2004 Open de Moselle on hard courts in Metz, France. Partnered with Ivan Ljubičić they managed to reach the final where they were defeated by French pairing Arnaud Clément and Nicolas Mahut in straight sets 2–6, 6–7^{(8–10)}.

Vico retired from professional tennis and became the coach of Italian tennis player Marco Cecchinato who defeated Novak Djokovic at the 2018 French Open Quarterfinals.

== ATP Career Finals ==
=== Doubles: 1 (1 runner-up) ===
Legend Grand Slam tournaments (0–0) ATP World Tour Finals (0–0) ATP World Tour Masters 1000 (0–0) ATP World Tour 500 Series (0–0) ATP World Tour 250 Series (0–1)	Finals by surface Hard (0–1) Clay (0–0) Grass (0–0)	Titles by setting Outdoor (0–0) Indoor (0–1)

Result	W–L	Date	Tournament	Tier	Surface	Partner	Opponents	Score
Loss	0–1	Oct 2004	Metz, France	250 Series	Hard	(Croatia) Ivan Ljubičić	(France) Arnaud Clément (France) Nicolas Mahut	2–6, 6–7^{(8–10)}

== ATP Challenger and ITF Futures finals ==
=== Singles: 14 (7–7) ===
Legend ATP Challenger (2–1) ITF Futures (5–6)	Finals by surface Hard (6–6) Clay (1–0) Grass (0–0) Carpet (0–1)

Result	W–L	Date	Tournament	Tier	Surface	Opponent	Score
Win	1–0	Jul 1999	Slovenia F2, Portorož	Futures	Clay	(Czech Republic) Jan Vacek	6–4, 6–2
Loss	1–1	Feb 2003	France F3, Bressuire	Futures	Hard	(France) Jérôme Haehnel	2–6, 0–6
Loss	1–2	Feb 2003	Croatia F2, Zagreb	Futures	Hard	(Croatia) Roko Karanušić	6–2, 3–6, 4–6
Win	2–2	Sep 2003	Italy F9, Oristano	Futures	Hard	(Czech Republic) Pavel Šnobel	6–4, 7–6^{(9–7)}
Win	3–2	Sep 2003	Italy F10, Selargius	Futures	Hard	(Italy) Daniele Giorgini	6–3, 7–6^{(7–1)}
Loss	3–3	Jan 2004	Qatar F1A, Doha	Futures	Hard	(Switzerland) Marco Chiudinelli	2–6, 4–6
Win	4–3	Feb 2004	Bahrain F1, Manama	Futures	Hard	(United Kingdom) Richard Bloomfield	6–3, 6–1
Loss	4–4	Mar 2004	France F4, Lille	Futures	Hard	(France) Jean-Michel Pequery	4–6, 4–6
Win	5–4	Mar 2004	France F5, Poitiers	Futures	Hard	(Canada) Frank Dancevic	7–6^{(8–6)}, 6–4
Win	6–4	Jul 2004	Recanati, Italy	Challenger	Hard	(Italy) Andrea Stoppini	6–7^{5–7}, 6–4, 6–4
Loss	6–5	Sep 2005	Italy F30, Sassari	Futures	Hard	(Italy) Stefano Galvani	4–6, 5–7
Loss	6–6	Apr 2006	Cardiff, United Kingdom	Challenger	Hard	(Czech Republic) Jan Vacek	6–7^{5–7}, 6–1, 3–6
Win	7–6	Jul 2006	Tolyatti, Russia	Challenger	Hard	(Austria) Alexander Peya	3–6, 6–4, 6–1
Loss	7–7	Feb 2008	Austria F3, Salzburg	Futures	Carpet	(Germany) Peter Gojowczyk	4–6, 4–6

=== Doubles: 31 (15–16) ===
Legend ATP Challenger (8–10) ITF Futures (7–6)	Finals by surface Hard (10–7) Clay (4–8) Grass (0–0) Carpet (1–1)

Result	W–L	Date	Tournament	Tier	Surface	Partner	Opponents	Score
Loss	0–1	Jun 1998	Italy F10, Turin	Futures	Clay	(Italy) Gianluca Gatto	(Italy) Omar Camporese (Portugal) João Cunha-Silva	5–7, 5–7
Win	1–1	Jul 1999	Austria F1, Salzburg	Futures	Clay	(Croatia) Goran Orešić	(Austria) Horst Skoff (Austria) Ingo Neumüller	6–4, 6–7, 7–6
Loss	1–2	Sep 2001	Brindisi, Italy	Challenger	Clay	(Italy) Cristian Brandi	(Italy) Daniele Bracciali (Italy) Giorgio Galimberti	2–6, 6–7^{(5–7)}, 6–7^{(3–7)}
Loss	1–3	Mar 2002	Barletta, Italy	Challenger	Clay	(Italy) Renzo Furlan	(Italy) Massimo Bertolini (Italy) Cristian Brandi	6–4, 3–6, 6–7^{(4–7)}
Loss	1–4	Apr 2003	Greece F1, Syros	Futures	Hard	(Switzerland) Marco Chiudinelli	(Israel) Jonathan Erlich (Israel) Andy Ram	3–6, 6–3, 3–6
Win	2–4	Jul 2003	Aptos, United States	Challenger	Hard	(Czech Republic) Jan Hernych	(United States) Matías Boeker (United States) Travis Parrott	6–3, 4–6, 6–1
Loss	2–5	Sep 2003	Italy F9, Oristano	Futures	Hard	(Italy) Alessandro Motti	(Italy) Daniele Giorgini (Italy) Stefano Mocci	6–2, 4–6, 6–7^{(3–7)}
Win	3–5	Sep 2003	Italy F10, Selargius	Futures	Hard	(Italy) Alessandro Motti	(Uzbekistan) Farrukh Dustov (Italy) Thomas Holzer	6–2, 6–2
Win	4–5	Feb 2004	Bahrain F1, Manama	Futures	Hard	(Switzerland) Marco Chiudinelli	(United Kingdom) James Auckland (Australia) Rameez Junaid	6–4, 6–1
Win	5–5	Jul 2004	Recanati, Italy	Challenger	Hard	(Italy) Massimo Dell'Acqua	(Italy) Daniele Giorgini (Italy) Federico Torresi	6–1, 6–4
Loss	5–6	Aug 2004	Bronx, United States	Challenger	Hard	(Russia) Igor Kunitsyn	(United States) Huntley Montgomery (United States) Tripp Phillips	6–7^{(6–8)}, 7–6^{(10–8)}, 2–6
Win	6–6	Sep 2004	Donetsk, Ukraine	Challenger	Hard	(Russia) Igor Kunitsyn	(Croatia) Lovro Zovko (Switzerland) Marco Chiudinelli	3–6, 6–3, 6–4
Win	7–6	Oct 2004	Grenoble, France	Challenger	Hard	(Croatia) Lovro Zovko	(Germany) Michael Berrer (Romania) Răzvan Sabău	6–2, 6–4
Loss	7–7	Apr 2005	Napoli, Italy	Challenger	Clay	(Italy) Massimo Bertolini	(Serbia and Montenegro) Janko Tipsarević (Czech Republic) Jiří Vaněk	6–3, 4–6, 2–6
Win	8–7	Apr 2005	Olbia, Italy	Challenger	Clay	(Italy) Massimo Bertolini	(Italy) Alessio di Mauro (Italy) Tomas Tenconi	6–4, 6–4
Loss	8–8	Apr 2005	Monza, Italy	Challenger	Clay	(Italy) Massimo Bertolini	(France) Nicolas Devilder (France) Olivier Patience	5–7, 4–6
Win	9–8	Jul 2005	Recanati, Italy	Challenger	Hard	(Croatia) Lovro Zovko	(Uzbekistan) Farrukh Dustov (Russia) Evgeny Korolev	7–6^{(7–2)}, 4–3 ret.
Loss	9–9	Aug 2005	Segovia, Spain	Challenger	Hard	(Italy) Daniele Bracciali	(Spain) Álex López Morón (Spain) Marcel Granollers	4–6, 2–6
Loss	9–10	Sep 2005	Donetsk, Ukraine	Challenger	Hard	(Croatia) Lovro Zovko	(Ukraine) Orest Tereshchuk (Ukraine) Mikhail Filima	2–6, 3–6
Win	10–10	Mar 2006	Wolfsburg, Germany	Challenger	Carpet	(Switzerland) Jean-Claude Scherrer	(Germany) Frank Moser (Germany) Sebastian Rieschick	7–6^{(7–3)}, 6–7^{(5–7)}, [10–8]
Win	11–10	Jul 2006	Togliatti, Russia	Challenger	Hard	(Austria) Alexander Peya	(Kazakhstan) Alexey Kedryuk (Ukraine) Orest Tereshchuk	6–4, 6–4
Loss	11–11	Jul 2007	Ireland F2, Limerick	Futures	Carpet	(Italy) Riccardo Ghedin	(Denmark) Rasmus Nørby (Denmark) Martin Pedersen	6–7^{(3–7)}, 4–6
Loss	11–12	Aug 2007	Saransk, Russia	Challenger	Clay	(Kazakhstan) Alexey Kedryuk	(Netherlands) Antal van der Duim (Netherlands) Boy Westerhof	6–2, 6–7^{(3–7)}, [9–11]
Win	12–12	Aug 2008	Lithuania F1, Vilnius	Futures	Clay	(Italy) Stefano Ianni	(Sweden) Tim Göransson (Denmark) Thomas Kromann	6–2, 6–3
Win	13–12	Aug 2008	Lithuania F2, Vilnius	Futures	Clay	(Italy) Fabio Colangelo	(Italy) Laurent Bondaz (Italy) Stefano Ianni	6–2, 6–4
Win	14–12	Sep 2008	Italy F30, Sassari	Futures	Hard	(Italy) Fabio Colangelo	(Italy) Enrico Iannuzzi (Italy) Matteo Volante	7–6^{(7–1)}, 6–0
Loss	14–13	Sep 2008	Italy F31, Alghero	Futures	Hard	(Italy) Pietro Fanucci	(Spain) David Ollivier-Baquero (Spain) Carlos Rexach-Itoiz	3–6, 6–4, [5–10]
Win	15–13	Jun 2009	Tunisia F3, Kelibia	Futures	Hard	(Italy) Matteo Volante	(Italy) Claudio Grassi (Czech Republic) Jiří Krkoška	7–6^{(8–6)}, 6–3
Loss	15–14	Aug 2009	Tampere, Finland	Challenger	Clay	(Italy) Simone Vagnozzi	(Kazakhstan) Yuri Schukin (Australia) Peter Luczak	1–6, 7–6^{(8–6)}, [4–10]
Loss	15–15	Sep 2009	Brașov, Romania	Challenger	Clay	(Italy) Simone Vagnozzi	(Spain) Pablo Santos González (Spain) Pere Riba	3–6, 2–6
Loss	15–16	Oct 2009	Italy F30, Quartu Sant'Elena	Futures	Hard	(Italy) Stefano Ianni	(Spain) Óscar Burrieza López (Spain) Javier Martí	5–7, 4–6

== Performance timeline ==
Key
W	F	SF	QF	#R	RR	Q#	DNQ	A	NH

(W) winner; (F) finalist; (SF) semifinalist; (QF) quarterfinalist; (#R) rounds 4, 3, 2, 1; (RR) round-robin stage; (Q#) qualification round; (DNQ) did not qualify; (A) absent; (NH) not held; (SR) strike rate (events won / competed); (W–L) win–loss record.

=== Singles ===
Tournament	2003	2004	2005	2006	2007	SR	W–L	Win %
Grand Slam tournaments
Australian Open	A	A	Q1	Q2	A	0 / 0	0–0	–
French Open	A	Q1	Q1	Q1	A	0 / 0	0–0	–
Wimbledon	Q1	Q1	Q3	Q2	Q1	0 / 0	0–0	–
US Open	A	Q3	A	Q2	A	0 / 0	0–0	–
Win–loss	0–0	0–0	0–0	0–0	0–0	0 / 0	0–0	–
ATP Tour Masters 1000
Indian Wells Masters	A	A	Q1	A	A	0 / 0	0–0	0%
Monte-Carlo Masters	A	1R	A	A	A	0 / 1	0–1	0%
Italian Open	A	Q1	A	A	A	0 / 0	0–0	–
Win–loss	0–0	0–1	0–0	0–0	0–0	0 / 1	0–1	0%

== See also ==
- Croats of Italy
- Marco Cecchinato
