= Arnaud Clément =

French tennis player (born 1977)

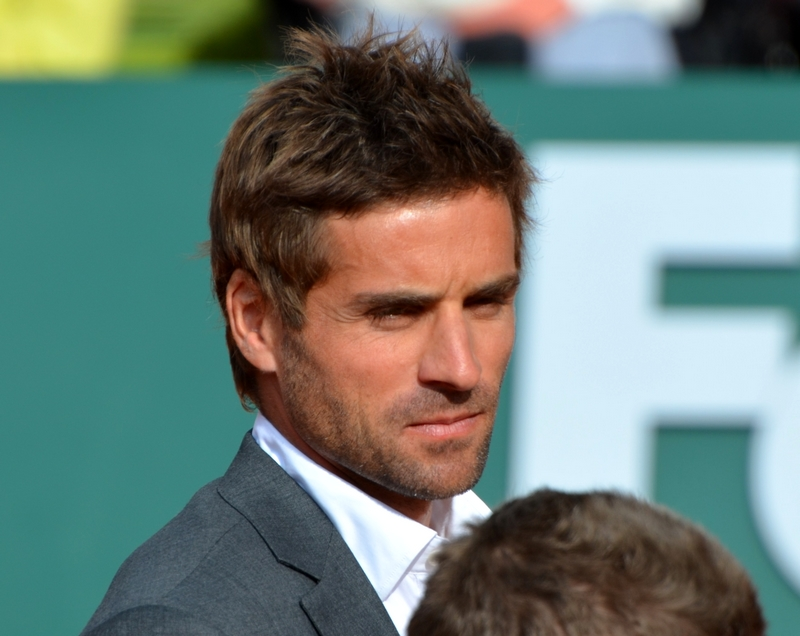
- Country (sports): France
- Residence: France
- Born: 17 December 1977 (age 47) Aix-en-Provence, France
- Height: 1.72 m (5 ft 8 in)
- Turned pro: 1996
- Retired: 5 July 2012
- Plays: Right-handed (two-handed backhand)
- Prize money: $7,125,228

Singles
- Career record: 316–327 (49.1%)
- Career titles: 4
- Highest ranking: No. 10 (2 April 2001)

Grand Slam singles results
- Australian Open: F (2001)
- French Open: 4R (2003)
- Wimbledon: QF (2008)
- US Open: QF (2000)

Other tournaments
- Olympic Games: 2R (2004, 2008)

Doubles
- Career record: 232–195 (54.3%)
- Career titles: 12
- Highest ranking: No. 8 (28 January 2008)

Grand Slam doubles results
- Australian Open: F (2008)
- French Open: SF (2001)
- Wimbledon: W (2007)
- US Open: QF (2006)

Team competitions
- Davis Cup: W (2001)

Arnaud Clément (French pronunciation: [aʁno klemɑ̃]; born 17 December 1977) is a French former professional tennis player and Davis Cup captain. Clément reached the final of the 2001 Australian Open and achieved a career-high singles ranking of world No. 10 in April 2001. He also had a career-high doubles ranking of No. 8. He won four ATP singles titles (Lyon 2000, Metz 2003, Marseille 2006, Washington 2006), and twelve doubles titles including 2007 Wimbledon, partnering Michaël Llodra, and two Masters titles.

He was the French Davis Cup captain from 2013 to 2015.

== Career ==
He turned professional in 1996, and achieved his career highlight at the 2001 Australian Open, reaching the men's singles final, where he was defeated by Andre Agassi in straight sets. En route, Clement defeated the then-unseeded future world No. 1, Roger Federer, and the former world No. 1, Yevgeny Kafelnikov.

Throughout his career, he has beaten top players such as Andre Agassi, Pat Rafter, Carlos Moyá and more recently Roger Federer, Rafael Nadal and Novak Djokovic. In doubles, Clément often partnered with fellow Frenchmen Sébastien Grosjean and Michaël Llodra.

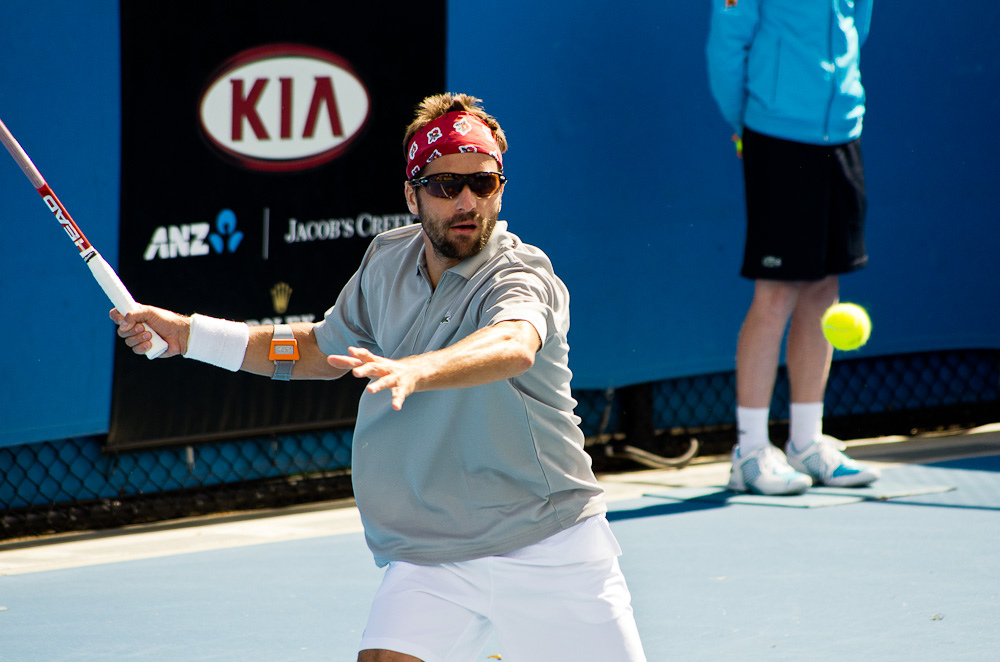
Arnaud Clement, 2012

Until 2010, Clément held the record for the longest match by time in the history of the Open Era. At Roland Garros 2004, Fabrice Santoro defeated Clément 6–4, 6–3, 6–7, 3–6, 16–14 in six hours and 33 minutes. John Isner and Nicolas Mahut would eventually beat this record six years later at Wimbledon.

In March 2006, Clément ended his two-and-a-half-year period of not winning an ATP singles title by capturing the Marseille Open, defeating world No. 2, Rafael Nadal, in the semifinals and Mario Ančić in the finals. In August 2006, Clément won his first ATP title in the United States, defeating Murray in straight sets in the final of the Legg Mason Tennis Classic.

In July 2007, Arnaud Clément and Michaël Llodra won the men's double title at Wimbledon, beating world No. 1 and top seeds defending champions, Bob and Mike Bryan, thus winning his first Grand Slam doubles title (Llodra had won two previous titles with Fabrice Santoro, making it his third Grand Slam title). He and Llodra were ecstatic, and celebrated by throwing their shirts, rackets, and towels into the crowd.

In July 2008, Arnaud Clément and Rainer Schüttler, both in their early 30s, played against each other in a Wimbledon quarterfinal singles match. Because of rain delays and darkness, play was suspended over a period of two days. Eventually, the match went in favour of Schüttler. The match went five sets and over five hours combined within the two playing days. The fifth set's score was 8–6. Finishing in five hours and twelve minutes, it was the third-longest men's singles match in Wimbledon history.

In June 2012, Arnaud Clément formalized his retirement from professional tennis at the age of 34, after a 16-year career.

== Personal life ==
While playing, he often wore a bandana and sunglasses. The sunglasses have been medically prescribed for Clement because of severe eye problems he has encountered through his life, which had nearly left him blind as a child. At only 13 months old, he was diagnosed with unilateral coloboma, meaning the condition only affects one eye, at that time Clément was only given a 40/60% chance of having healthy eyesight for the rest of his life, throughout his tennis career Clément has worn sunglasses to protect his eyes.

Clément was selected to represent one of the world's best-known and most important fashion labels, Lacoste. He was seen from May 2004 onwards in a pan-European print and TV campaign alongside the Danish pop singer Natasha Thomas. The advert was directed and shot by Bruno Aveillan.

Clément has been in a relationship with French pop singer Nolwenn Leroy since 2008.

== Significant finals ==
=== Grand Slam finals ===
==== Singles: 1 (1 runner-up) ====
Result	Year	Championship	Surface	Opponent	Score
Loss	2001	Australian Open	Hard	(United States) Andre Agassi	4–6, 2–6, 2–6

==== Doubles: 2 (1 title, 1 runner-up) ====
Result	Year	Championship	Surface	Partner	Opponents	Score
Win	2007	Wimbledon	Grass	(France) Michaël Llodra	(United States) Bob Bryan (United States) Mike Bryan	6–7^{(5–7)}, 6–3, 6–4, 6–4
Loss	2008	Australian Open	Hard	(France) Michaël Llodra	(Israel) Jonathan Erlich (Israel) Andy Ram	5–7, 6–7^{(4–7)}

=== Masters 1000 finals ===
==== Doubles: 2 (2 titles) ====
Result	Year	Tournament	Surface	Partner	Opponents	Score
Win	2004	Indian Wells Masters	Hard	(France) Sébastien Grosjean	(Zimbabwe) Wayne Black (Zimbabwe) Kevin Ullyett	6–3, 4–6, 7–5
Win	2006	Paris Masters	Carpet (i)	(France) Michaël Llodra	(France) Fabrice Santoro (Serbia) Nenad Zimonjić	7–6^{(7–4)}, 6–4

== ATP career finals ==
=== Singles: 11 (4 titles, 7 runner-ups) ===
Legend Grand Slam tournaments (0–1) ATP Masters Series / ATP World Tour Masters 1000 (0–0) ATP International Series Gold / ATP World Tour 500 Series (0–0) ATP International Series / ATP World Tour 250 Series (4–6)	Finals by surface Hard (3–3) Clay (0–0) Grass (0–3) Carpet (1–1)	Finals by setting Outdoor (1–5) Indoor (3–2)

Result	W–L	Date	Tournament	Tier	Surface	Opponent	Score
Loss	0–1	Feb 1999	Open 13, France	International	Hard (i)	(France) Fabrice Santoro	3–6, 6–4, 4–6
Win	1–1	Nov 2000	Grand Prix de Tennis de Lyon, France	International	Carpet (i)	(Australia) Pat Rafter	7–6^{(7–2)}, 7–6^{(7–5)}
Loss	1–2	Jan 2001	Australian Open, Melbourne, Australia	Grand Slam	Hard	(United States) Andre Agassi	4–6, 2–6, 2–6
Loss	1–3	Jun 2002	Rosmalen Championships, Netherlands	International	Grass	(Netherlands) Sjeng Schalken	6–3, 3–6, 2–6
Loss	1–4	Jun 2003	Rosmalen Championships, Netherlands	International	Grass	(Netherlands) Sjeng Schalken	3–6, 4–6
Win	2–4	Oct 2003	Open de Moselle, France	International	Hard (i)	(Chile) Fernando González	6–3, 1–6, 6–3
Loss	2–5	Oct 2003	Grand Prix de Tennis de Lyon, France	International	Carpet (i)	(Germany) Rainer Schüttler	5–7, 3–6
Win	3–5	Feb 2006	Open 13, France	International	Hard (i)	(Croatia) Mario Ančić	6–4, 6–2
Win	4–5	Aug 2006	Washington Open, United States	International	Hard	(United Kingdom) Andy Murray	7–6^{(7–3)}, 6–2
Loss	4–6	Jun 2007	Nottingham Open, United Kingdom	International	Grass	(Croatia) Ivo Karlović	6–3, 4–6, 4–6
Loss	4–7	Jan 2010	Auckland Open, New Zealand	250 Series	Hard	(United States) John Isner	3–6, 7–5, 6–7^{(2–7)}

=== Doubles: 22 (12 titles, 10 runner-ups) ===
Legend Grand Slam tournaments (1–1) ATP Masters Series / ATP World Tour Masters 1000 (2–0) ATP International Series Gold / ATP World Tour 500 Series (0–0) ATP International Series / ATP World Tour 250 Series (7–9)	Finals by surface Hard (7–7) Clay (1–0) Grass (1–1) Carpet (3–2)	Finals by setting Outdoor (3–4) Indoor (9–6)

Result	W–L	Date	Tournament	Tier	Surface	Partner	Opponents	Score
Win	1–0	Apr 2000	Grand Prix Hassan II, Morocco	International	Clay	(France) Sébastien Grosjean	(Germany) Lars Burgsmüller (Australia) Andrew Painter	7–6^{(7–4)}, 6–4
Loss	1–1	Oct 2001	Grand Prix de Tennis de Lyon, France	International	Carpet (i)	(France) Sébastien Grosjean	(Canada) Daniel Nestor (Serbia and Montenegro) Nenad Zimonjić	1–6, 2–6
Win	2–1	Feb 2002	Open 13, France	International	Hard (i)	(France) Nicolas Escudé	(France) Julien Boutter (Belarus) Max Mirnyi	6–4, 6–3
Loss	2–2	Jan 2004	Adelaide International, Australia	International	Hard	(France) Michaël Llodra	(United States) Bob Bryan (United States) Mike Bryan	5–7, 3–6
Win	3–2	Mar 2004	Indian Wells Masters, United States	Masters	Hard	(France) Sébastien Grosjean	(Zimbabwe) Wayne Black (Zimbabwe) Kevin Ullyett	6–3, 4–6, 7–5
Win	4–2	Oct 2004	Open de Moselle, France	International	Hard (i)	(France) Nicolas Mahut	(Croatia) Ivan Ljubičić (Italy) Uros Vico	6–2, 7–6^{(10–8)}
Win	5–2	Oct 2004	St. Petersburg Open, Russia	International	Carpet (i)	(France) Michaël Llodra	(Slovakia) Dominik Hrbatý (Czech Republic) Jaroslav Levinský	6–3, 6–2
Loss	5–3	Jan 2005	Sydney International, Australia	International	Hard	(France) Michaël Llodra	(India) Mahesh Bhupathi (Australia) Todd Woodbridge	3–6, 3–6
Loss	5–4	Feb 2005	Milan Indoor, Italy	International	Carpet (i)	(France) Jean-François Bachelot	(Italy) Daniele Bracciali (Italy) Giorgio Galimberti	6–7^{(8–10)}, 7–6^{(8–6)}, 6–4
Loss	5–5	Jun 2006	Rosmalen Championships, Netherlands	International	Grass	(South Africa) Chris Haggard	(Czech Republic) Martin Damm (India) Leander Paes	1–6, 6–7^{(3–7)}
Win	6–5	Oct 2006	Grand Prix de Tennis de Lyon, France	International	Carpet (i)	(France) Julien Benneteau	(Czech Republic) František Čermák (Czech Republic) Jaroslav Levinský	6–2, 6–7^{(3–7)}, [10–7]
Loss	6–6	Oct 2007	Stockholm Open, Sweden	International	Hard (i)	(France) Michaël Llodra	(Sweden) Jonas Björkman (Belarus) Max Mirnyi	4–6, 4–6
Win	7–6	Nov 2006	Paris Masters, France	Masters	Carpet (i)	(France) Michaël Llodra	(France) Fabrice Santoro (Serbia) Nenad Zimonjić	7–6^{(7–4)}, 6–2
Win	8–6	Feb 2007	Open 13, France (2)	International	Hard (i)	(France) Michaël Llodra	(The Bahamas) Mark Knowles (Canada) Daniel Nestor	7–5, 4–6, [10–8]
Win	9–6	Jul 2007	Wimbledon, United Kingdom	Grand Slam	Grass	(France) Michaël Llodra	(United States) Bob Bryan (United States) Mike Bryan	6–7^{(5–7)}, 6–3, 6–4, 6–4
Win	10–6	Oct 2007	Open de Moselle, France (2)	International	Hard (i)	(France) Michaël Llodra	(Poland) Mariusz Fyrstenberg (Poland) Marcin Matkowski	6–1, 6–4
Loss	10–7	Jan 2008	Australian Open, Australia	Grand Slam	Hard	(France) Michaël Llodra	(Israel) Jonathan Erlich (Israel) Andy Ram	5–7, 6–7^{(4–7)}
Win	11–7	Oct 2008	Open de Moselle, France (3)	International	Hard (i)	(France) Michaël Llodra	(Poland) Mariusz Fyrstenberg (Poland) Marcin Matkowski	5–7, 6–3, [10–8]
Win	12–7	Feb 2009	Open 13, France (3)	250 Series	Hard (i)	(France) Michaël Llodra	(Austria) Julian Knowle (Israel) Andy Ram	3–6, 6–3, [10–8]
Loss	12–8	Sep 2009	Open de Moselle, France	250 Series	Hard (i)	(France) Michaël Llodra	(United Kingdom) Colin Fleming (United Kingdom) Ken Skupski	6–2, 4–6, [5–10]
Loss	12–9	Oct 2009	Grand Prix de Tennis de Lyon, France	250 Series	Hard (i)	(France) Sébastien Grosjean	(France) Julien Benneteau (France) Nicolas Mahut	4–6, 6–7^{(6–8)}
Loss	12–10	Feb 2010	Zagreb Indoors, Croatia	250 Series	Hard (i)	(Belgium) Olivier Rochus	(Austria) Jürgen Melzer (Germany) Philipp Petzschner	6–3, 3–6, [8–10]

== Performance timelines ==
Key
W	F	SF	QF	#R	RR	Q#	DNQ	A	NH

(W) winner; (F) finalist; (SF) semifinalist; (QF) quarterfinalist; (#R) rounds 4, 3, 2, 1; (RR) round-robin stage; (Q#) qualification round; (DNQ) did not qualify; (A) absent; (NH) not held; (SR) strike rate (events won / competed); (W–L) win–loss record.

=== Singles ===
Tournament	1997	1998	1999	2000	2001	2002	2003	2004	2005	2006	2007	2008	2009	2010	2011	2012	SR
Grand Slam tournaments
Australian Open	A	1R	2R	4R	F	2R	A	1R	1R	1R	2R	1R	2R	1R	1R	Q1	0 / 13
French Open	1R	1R	2R	2R	1R	3R	4R	1R	2R	A	1R	1R	2R	1R	2R	2R	0 / 15
Wimbledon	3R	1R	2R	2R	4R	4R	2R	1R	1R	2R	1R	QF	1R	3R	1R	Q1	0 / 15
US Open	Q1	1R	4R	QF	4R	4R	2R	2R	3R	1R	2R	1R	Q1	3R	Q1	A	0 / 12
Grand Slam SR	0 / 2	0 / 4	0 / 4	0 / 4	0 / 4	0 / 4	0 / 3	0 / 4	0 / 4	0 / 3	0 / 4	0 / 4	0 / 3	0 / 4	0 / 3	0 / 1	0 / 55
ATP Masters Series
Indian Wells	A	A	A	1R	3R	1R	2R	2R	2R	2R	2R	1R	A	2R	A	A	0 / 10
Miami	A	1R	2R	2R	3R	2R	2R	2R	3R	2R	2R	2R	1R	1R	Q1	2R	0 / 14
Monte Carlo	Q1	1R	1R	3R	1R	1R	2R	1R	A	1R	2R	Q1	Q1	Q2	A	Q1	0 / 9
Rome	A	2R	2R	Q2	1R	2R	2R	1R	A	A	A	Q2	Q2	A	A	A	0 / 6
Madrid (Stuttgart)	A	A	1R	2R	2R	1R	1R	A	A	A	1R	A	A	A	A	Q1	0 / 6
Canada	A	1R	2R	2R	QF	1R	2R	A	2R	2R	2R	1R	A	Q1	A	A	0 / 10
Cincinnati	A	1R	1R	SF	2R	1R	3R	1R	Q2	1R	2R	2R	A	Q2	A	A	0 / 10
Shanghai	Not Held												A	A	A	A	0 / 0
Paris	2R	1R	1R	2R	2R	2R	A	1R	2R	2R	1R	Q1	3R	2R	Q2	A	0 / 12
Hamburg	A	A	Q1	Q2	1R	1R	2R	1R	A	A	2R	A	NM1				0 / 5
Masters Series SR	0 / 1	0 / 6	0 / 7	0 / 7	0 / 9	0 / 9	0 / 8	0 / 7	0 / 4	0 / 6	0 / 8	0 / 4	0 / 2	0 / 3	0 / 0	0 / 1	0 / 82
Year-end ranking	94	104	56	18	17	38	31	106	69	42	54	93	63	78	152	295	

=== Doubles ===
Tournament	1996	1997	1998	1999	2000	2001	2002	2003	2004	2005	2006	2007	2008	2009	2010	2011	2012	SR
Grand Slam tournaments
Australian Open	A	A	A	A	A	3R	SF	A	2R	1R	2R	1R	F	1R	QF	2R	A	0 / 10
French Open	A	1R	1R	1R	1R	SF	A	3R	2R	1R	A	3R	1R	1R	1R	1R	1R	0 / 14
Wimbledon	A	A	A	A	A	1R	A	A	A	2R	A	W	A	2R	1R	QF	3R	1 / 7
US Open	A	A	A	A	A	2R	2R	A	1R	1R	QF	2R	1R	A	1R	1R	A	0 / 9
Grand Slam SR	0 / 0	0 / 1	0 / 1	0 / 1	0 / 1	0 / 4	0 / 2	0 / 1	0 / 3	0 / 4	0 / 2	1 / 4	0 / 3	0 / 3	0 / 4	0 / 4	0 / 3	1 / 41
ATP Masters Series
Indian Wells	A	A	A	A	2R	A	1R	A	W	1R	A	2R	2R	A	A	A	A	1 / 6
Miami	A	A	A	A	A	1R	1R	A	QF	QF	2R	SF	QF	A	QF	A	A	0 / 8
Monte Carlo	A	A	A	1R	2R	2R	SF	1R	1R	A	2R	1R	2R	A	A	A	1R	0 / 10
Rome	A	A	A	A	1R	2R	A	A	2R	A	A	2R	2R	A	A	A	A	0 / 5
Madrid (Stuttgart)	A	A	A	A	A	A	A	A	A	A	A	2R	2R	A	A	A	A	0 / 2
Canada	A	A	A	1R	1R	A	1R	A	A	A	A	QF	1R	A	A	A		0 / 10
Cincinnati	A	A	A	A	A	A	1R	A	1R	A	A	2R	A	A	A	A		0 / 3
Shanghai	Not Held													A	A	A		0 / 0
Paris	A	QF	1R	1R	1R	2R	QF	A	1R	1R	W	SF	SF	2R	2R	2R		1 / 14
Hamburg	A	A	A	A	A	A	2R	1R	1R	A	A	QF	A	NM1				0 / 4
Masters Series SR	0 / 0	0 / 1	0 / 1	0 / 3	0 / 5	0 / 4	0 / 7	0 / 2	1 / 7	0 / 3	1 / 3	0 / 9	0 / 7	0 / 1	0 / 2	0 / 1	0 / 1	2 / 62
Year-end ranking	453	223	238	657	116	40	39	194	31	86	28	14	29	72	61	79		

== Top 10 wins ==
Season	1997	1998	1999	2000	2001	2002	2003	2004	2005	2006	2007	2008	2009	2010	2011	2012	Total
Wins	2	0	0	4	2	5	1	0	0	1	1	0	1	0	0	0	17

#	Player	Rank	Event	Surface	Rd.	Score
1997
1.	(Spain) Sergi Bruguera	7	Vienna, Austria	Carpet (i)	1R	6–2, 7–6^{(8–6)}
2.	(Australia) Patrick Rafter	3	Lyon, France	Carpet (i)	1R	6–3, 7–6^{(7–5)}
2000
3.	(Ecuador) Nicolás Lapentti	7	Australian Open, Melbourne	Hard	2R	3–6, 7–6^{(7–3)}, 6–2, 4–1 ret.
4.	(Russia) Yevgeny Kafelnikov	5	Cincinnati, United States	Hard	3R	6–4, 6–1
5.	(United States) Andre Agassi	1	US Open, New York	Hard	2R	6–3, 6–2, 6–4
6.	(United States) Andre Agassi	7	Lyon, France	Carpet (i)	SF	6–3, ret.
2001
7.	(Russia) Yevgeny Kafelnikov	5	Australian Open, Melbourne	Hard	QF	6–4, 5–7, 7–6^{(7–3)}, 7–6^{(7–3)}
8.	(Russia) Yevgeny Kafelnikov	7	World Team Cup, Düsseldorf	Clay	RR	6–3, 6–0
2002
9.	(Sweden) Thomas Johansson	9	Rotterdam, Netherlands	Hard (i)	2R	6–2, 6–3
10.	(Sweden) Thomas Johansson	8	Rome, Italy	Clay	1R	6–4, 6–4
11.	(Sweden) Thomas Johansson	9	French Open, Paris	Clay	2R	7–6^{(7–4)}, 6–1, 6–3
12.	(France) Sébastien Grosjean	10	US Open, New York	Hard	2R	6–3, 3–6, 4–6, 6–2, 6–4
13.	(France) Sébastien Grosjean	8	Lyon, France	Carpet (i)	QF	6–3, 7–6^{(7–3)}
2003
14.	(Spain) Carlos Moyá	4	Montreal, Canada	Hard	1R	7–6^{(7–4)}, 4–6, 6–3
2006
15.	(Spain) Rafael Nadal	2	Marseille, France	Hard (i)	SF	2–6, 6–3, 7–5
2007
16.	(Serbia) Novak Djokovic	4	Queen's Club, United Kingdom	Grass	3R	2–6, 6–3, 6–4
2009
17.	(France) Jo-Wilfried Tsonga	8	Lyon, France	Hard (i)	QF	5–7, 6–4, 7–6^{(10–8)}
