= Bryan brothers =

American tennis doubles team

Bob and Mike Bryan
The Bryan brothers' chest bump celebration
Ages: 46	Bob	Mike
Highest doubles ranking:	1 (September 8, 2003)	1 (September 8, 2003)
Men's Doubles titles:	119	124 (Note: Three with Jack Sock, and one each with Mark Knowles and Mahesh Bhupathi.)
Grand Slam; Men's Doubles titles:	16 titles: Australian Open (6): (2006, 2007, 2009, 2010, 2011, 2013); French Open (2): (2003, 2013); Wimbledon (3): (2006, 2011, 2013); US Open (5): (2005, 2008, 2010, 2012, 2014)	18 titles: Australian Open (6): (2006, 2007, 2009, 2010, 2011, 2013); French Open (2): (2003, 2013); Wimbledon (4): (2006, 2011, 2013, 2018); US Open (6): (2005, 2008, 2010, 2012, 2014, 2018)
Grand Slam Mixed; Doubles titles:	7 titles: French Open (2): (2008, 2009); Wimbledon (1): (2008); US Open (4): (2003, 2004, 2006, 2010)	4 titles: French Open (2): (2003, 2015); Wimbledon (1): (2012); US Open (1): (2002)
Masters Men's; Doubles titles:	39 titles	39 titles
Summer Olympics Winners:	Gold (London 2012)	Gold (London 2012)
Summer Olympics; Other Medals:	Bronze (Beijing 2008)	Bronze (Beijing 2008) Bronze (London 2012) Mixed doubles
Pan Am Games; Men's Doubles:	Bronze (Winnipeg 1999)	Bronze (Winnipeg 1999)
Davis Cup titles:	1 title: (2007)	1 title: (2007)
World Tour Finals:	4 titles: (2003, 2004, 2009, 2014)	5 titles: (2003, 2004, 2009, 2014, 2018)

The Bryan brothers, identical twin brothers Bob Bryan and Mike Bryan, are American former professional doubles tennis players. The most successful men's doubles team of all time, they won more professional matches, tournaments and majors than any other men's pairing, as well as multiple Olympic medals, including the gold in 2012. The Bryans jointly held the world No. 1 doubles ranking for a record 438 weeks, including for a record 139 consecutive weeks. They finished as the year-end No. 1 team a record ten times. Between 2005 and 2006, they competed in an Open Era record seven consecutive men's doubles major finals. The Bryans won 119 doubles titles together, including 16 majors – completing the double career Grand Slam – as well as Olympic gold and bronze medals, four Tour Finals titles, a record 39 Masters events, and were part of the victorious United States Davis Cup team in 2007. Alongside Daniel Nestor, the Bryans are the only doubles players to win every major and Masters event, an Olympic gold medal, and the Tour Finals: completing the Big Titles sweep.

The Bryans' success is attributed in part to their particular brand of twinship: the Bryans are "mirror twins", where one is right-handed (Mike) and the other left-handed (Bob). This is advantageous for their court coverage. They were coached by David Macpherson between 2005 and 2016. In January 2017 they reunited with coach Phil Farmer, who previously trained them to their first major title. In October 2017, Macpherson and Dr. Dave Marshall assumed coaching duties, with Marshall handling day-to-day responsibilities, until the duo retired.

Turning pro in 1998, the brothers retired in August 2020, having played (and won) their final match as a team in March of that year. They were well known for celebrating winning points by chest-bumping each other.

== Records and achievements ==
On October 28, 2016, they recorded their all-time record 1000th match win, as a team, by defeating Pablo Cuevas and Viktor Troicki in the quarter-finals of the 2016 Erste Bank Open, in Vienna, Austria. Following their triumph at the 2013 Wimbledon Championships, the Bryans became the only doubles pairing in the Open Era to hold all four major titles at once (but not in a single season). They also won Olympic Gold during this period. They are also the only doubles team in history to have won every major title, having won all four Grand Slams, Olympic Gold, every (12 versions of the 9 tournaments) ATP World Tour Masters 1000 title, the ATP World Tour Finals and the Davis Cup during their careers.

The two have won a record 119 tour titles, surpassing The Woodies (Todd Woodbridge and Mark Woodforde) who won 61, and have been finalists on 59 other occasions. They have a career "Super Slam" with 16 Grand Slam titles overall, which is more than any men's team in the Open Era. These include victories at the Australian Open (2006, 2007, 2009, 2010, 2011 and 2013), the French Open (2003, 2013), Wimbledon (2006, 2011, 2013), and the US Open (2005, 2008, 2010, 2012 and 2014). They are the only doubles pairing in history to have completed the "Double Career Grand Slam", having won all four Grand Slam titles at least twice as a team. They won the ATP World Tour Finals doubles tournament four times (2003, 2004, 2009 and 2014).

They won the gold medal at the 2012 Summer Olympics in London and the bronze medal at the 2008 Beijing Olympics. They won the 2007 Davis Cup, along with Andy Roddick and James Blake. The brothers were named ATP Team of the Decade for 2000–2009 and for 2010–2019.

The twins were part of the United States Davis Cup team, with a 25–5 record in doubles matches, the most wins ever by a USA doubles team. Both brothers have played Davis Cup singles matches (Bob is 4–2 and Mike is 0–1).

=== Doubles records ===
- These records were attained in the Open Era of tennis.
- Records in **bold** indicate peer-less achievements.

Time span	Selected Grand Slam tournament records	Players matched
**2003 French Open–** **2014 US Open**	**16 titles as a team**	**Stands alone**
**2003 French Open–** **2017 Australian Open**	**30 finals as a team**	**Stands alone**
2003 French Open– 2006 Wimbledon	Career Grand Slam as a team	Jacco Eltingh and Paul Haarhuis; Todd Woodbridge and Mark Woodforde; Pierre-Hugues Herbert and Nicolas Mahut
2003 French Open- 2012 Olympics	Career Golden Slam as a team	Todd Woodbridge and Mark Woodforde
2003 French Open– 2012 Olympics	Career Super Slam as a team	Todd Woodbridge and Mark Woodforde
**2012 US Open–** **2013 Wimbledon**	**Holders of all four Majors simultaneously in a non-calendar year**	**Stands alone**
**2012 Olympics–** **2013 Wimbledon**	**Holders of Olympic gold and all four Majors simultaneously**	**Stands alone**
2013 Australian Open– 2013 Wimbledon	3 titles in a single season as a team	Anders Järryd and John Fitzgerald
**2005 US Open–** **2014 US Open**	**10 consecutive years winning 1+ title**	**Stands alone**
**2003 French Open–** **2017 Australian Open**	**15 consecutive years reaching 1+ final**	**Stands alone**
**2003 French Open–** **2014 US Open**	**2+ titles at all 4 Majors as a team**	**Stands alone**
**2005 US Open–** **2014 US Open**	**3+ titles at 3 different Majors as a team**	**Stands alone**
**2005 US Open–** **2014 US Open**	**5+ titles at 2 different Majors as a team**	**Stands alone**
**2003 French Open–** **2017 Australian Open**	**6+ finals at all 4 Majors as a team**	**Stands alone**
**2005 Australian Open–** **2006 Wimbledon**	**7 consecutive finals as a team**	**Stands alone**
**1999 French Open–** **2020 Australian Open**	**284 match wins as a team**	**Stands alone**
**1999 French Open–** **2018 Australian Open**	**76 consecutive tournament appearances as a team**	**Stands alone**
**2013 Australian Open–** **2013 US Open**	**22 match wins in a single season as a team**	**Stands alone**
**2012 US Open–** **2013 US Open**	**28 consecutive match wins as a team**	**Stands alone**

Grand Slam tournaments	Time span	Records at each Grand Slam tournament	Players matched
**Australian Open**	**2006–2013**	**6 titles overall**	**Stands alone**
**Australian Open**	**2009–2011**	**3 consecutive titles**	**Stands alone**
**Australian Open**	**2004–2017**	**10 finals overall**	**Stands alone**
**Australian Open**	**2009–2013**	**5 consecutive finals**	**Stands alone**
**French Open**	**2003–2016**	**7 finals overall**	**Stands alone**
**Wimbledon**	**2005–2014**	**7 finals overall**	Todd Woodbridge and Mark Woodforde
**US Open**	**2005–2014**	**5 titles overall**	**Stands alone**
**US Open**	**2003–2014**	**6 finals overall**	**Stands alone**
French Open—Wimbledon	2013	Accomplished a "Channel Slam": Winning both tournaments in the same year	John Newcombe and Tony Roche; Bob Hewitt and Frew McMillan; Anders Järryd and John Fitzgerald; Jacco Eltingh and Paul Haarhuis; Mahesh Bhupathi and Leander Paes; Todd Woodbridge and Mark Woodforde

Time span	Other selected records	Players matched
**2001–2020**	**119 titles as a team**	**Stands alone**
**1999–2020**	**178 finals as a team**	**Stands alone**
**1996–2020**	**1108 match wins as a team**	**Stands alone**
**2001–2017**	**13+ titles on three different surfaces**	**Stands alone**
**2002–2015**	**14 consecutive years winning 5+ titles**	**Stands alone**
**2001–2020**	**20 consecutive years winning at least one title**	**Stands alone**
**2001–2019**	**18 consecutive years qualifying for ATP Final**	**Stands alone**
**2003–2015**	**438 total weeks at No. 1 as a team**	**Stands alone**
**February 25, 2013 –** **October 25, 2015**	**139 consecutive weeks at No. 1 as a team**	**Stands alone**
**2003–2014**	**10 year-end No. 1 rankings as a team**	**Stands alone**
**2006, 2011, 2013–2014**	**4 years as wire-to-wire No. 1**	**Stands alone**
**2013–2014**	**2 consecutive years as wire-to-wire No. 1**	**Stands alone**
**2009–2014**	**6 consecutive year-end No. 1 rankings as a team**	**Stands alone**
**2013**	**Earliest obtaining of year-end No. 1 ranking for team (August 19)**	**Stands alone**
**2001–2019**	**19 consecutive year-end Top 10 rankings for team**	**Stands alone**
**2002–2019**	**39 Masters 1000 titles as a team**	**Stands alone**
**2002–2019**	**59 Masters 1000 finals as a team**	**Stands alone**
**2002–2015**	**12 different versions of Masters 1000 titles as a team** (Note: Including Hamburg when it was still a Masters 1000 event.)	**Stands alone**
**2014**	**6 Masters 1000 titles in a single season as a team**	**Stands alone**
**2010, 2013–2014**	**4 consecutive Masters 1000 titles as a team**	**Stands alone**
**2007, 2014**	**7 Masters 1000 finals in a single season as a team**	**Stands alone**
**1999–2019**	**338 Masters 1000 match wins as a team**	**Stands alone**
2014	Indian Wells-Miami (Sunshine) double as a team	Todd Woodbridge and Mark Woodforde; Wayne Black and Sandon Stolle; Mark Knowles and Daniel Nestor; Nicolas Mahut and Pierre-Hugues Herbert
2010	Rome-Madrid double as a team	Daniel Nestor and Nenad Zimonjic
2013	Madrid-Rome double as a team	Daniel Nestor and Nenad Zimonjić
2010	Canada-Cincinnati double as a team	Nicolas Mahut and Pierre-Hugues Herbert
**2013**	**Italian Open-French Open-Wimbledon, Old World treble, as a team**	**Stands alone**
**2002-2005**	**Mexican Open-Canadian Open-US Open, career North American treble, as a team**	**Stands alone**
**2010–2011, 2012–2013**	**Canadian Open-US Open-Australian Open-Wimbledon, Colonial slam,** **as a team in a non-calendar year**	**Stands alone**
**2002–2013**	**Winning all 4 Majors, the World Tour Finals, all 9 Masters 1000 titles,** **Olympic Gold, and the Davis Cup as a team**	**Stands alone**

=== Professional awards ===
- ITF World Champion: 2003, 2004, 2005, 2006, 2007, 2009, 2010, 2011, 2012, 2013, 2014, 2018 Mike with Jack Sock
- ATP World Tour Fans' Favorite Team: 2005, 2006, 2007, 2008, 2009, 2010, 2011, 2012, 2013, 2014, 2015, 2016, 2017, 2018 Mike with Jack Sock (Note: Mike Bryan has won the award since its establishment.), 2019
- Arthur Ashe Humanitarian of the Year: 2015

=== Other achievements ===
- Played in front of the second largest crowd, at an official match, in tennis history (27,200 at the Davis Cup final in Seville, Spain – December 4, 2004) (Note: King's victory over Riggs at the Astrodome was not an official match, but seated 39,472)
- Won a record 25 Davis Cup World Group matches for the United States
- Davis Cup Commitment Award

== Junior career ==
Bob and Mike won their first doubles tournament at age 6, in a 10-and-under event. They attended Mesa Union School (Somis, California) for elementary and junior high school, then Rio Mesa High School in Oxnard, California. They had an outstanding junior career, winning well over a hundred junior doubles titles together. They won the 1991 USTA National Boys' 14 Doubles Championships, the 1992 USTA National Boys' 14 Clay Court doubles title, the 1994 USTA National Boys' 16 Clay Court doubles title, the 1995 USTA National Boys' 18 Clay Courts doubles title, the 1995 USTA National Boys' 18 doubles title, and the first-ever Easter Bowl boys' 18 doubles title. The duo won four consecutive doubles titles at the Ojai Tennis Tournament from 1993 to 1996, including twice in the boys' 16s and twice in the CIF Interscholastic division.

The brothers won the USTA National Boys' 18 Clay Court Championships again in 1996, becoming the first team in 30 years to repeat as doubles champions at that event. Bob and Mike became the first repeat doubles champions in 50 years at the 1996 USTA National Boys' 18 Championships in Kalamazoo, Michigan, defeating Michael Russell and Kevin Kim in the final. The Bryans then won the 1996 US Open junior boys' doubles title, defeating Daniele Bracciali of Italy and Jocelyn Robichaud of Canada 5–7, 6–3, 6–4 in the final. They won the bronze medal in men's doubles at the 1999 Pan American Games held in Winnipeg, Manitoba, Canada, where they represented the United States for the first time as professionals.

Both were awarded full-ride tennis scholarships to Stanford University in fall 1996, and played there through 1998, helping the team to an NCAA team title both years. They won the NCAA doubles title in 1998, defeating Kelly Gullet and Robert Lindstedt of Pepperdine University in the final, becoming the first brothers to win the NCAA doubles title since Robert and Tom Falkenberg of USC in 1946. They finished the year ranked No. 1 in the collegiate doubles rankings.

== Professional career ==
=== Early career ===
The Bryans made their Grand Slam debut at the 1995 US Open, where they lost in the first round to Grant Connell and Patrick Galbraith. Their first tour win came in 1998, at the ATP Washington, D.C. and won two Challenger tournaments, at Aptos and Burbank.

In 1999, the twins reached their first ATP final at Orlando, falling in the finals to Jim Courier and Todd Woodbridge. They reached the semi-finals at Scottsdale, and the quarter-finals at Indian Wells and Key Biscayne. The brothers were successful on the Challenger Circuit, winning three tournaments (Amarillo, Birmingham, Burbank), and reaching the finals in four others.

The next season saw the brothers win their first match at a Grand Slam when they reached the quarter-finals of the US Open (1st round, beat David Adams and John-Laffnie de Jager). They reached three ATP semi-finals (San Jose, Orlando, Newport), and two other quarter-finals (Queen's Club, Washington, D.C.). On the Challenger Circuit they won the title at Aptos and were losing finalists at San Antonio, Burbank and Rancho Mirage.

The brothers have only played each other in three professionally recognized matches, once each in 1998, 1999, and 2000, playing at U.S.A. F12, Hong Kong, and Armonk, respectively. Mike leads the series 2–1, coming back after losing to Bob in the 1998 match. Each match was played in the Best of Three Sets format, and each was won in straight sets. The ATP classified all three of these matches as "Qualifying, Challenger And Futures Matches," meaning they do not count towards their overall singles records, but the matches were still recorded. Bob won the first match 6–4, 6–3; Mike won the second and third matches 6–4, 6–4, and 6–3, 6–4, respectively.

=== 2001–2002: First titles and Slam semifinals ===
2001 was the first really successful season for the Bryans as they captured four titles (Memphis, Queen's Club, Newport, Los Angeles) in five finals (were finalists at Washington losing to Martin Damm and David Prinosil). The first ATP doubles title came at Memphis, by defeating Alex O'Brien and Jonathan Stark in the final. They became the first brothers combination to win four titles in a season (Tim and Tom Gullikson won three in 1978 and 1982). They reached their first Grand Slam semi-final at Wimbledon and finished the year at No. 7 in the ATP Doubles Race, with a 45–23 match record.

The next season saw the Bryans win a career-high five ATP doubles titles, including their first ATP Masters Series title. They won that AMS title at Toronto, where they beat Mark Knowles and Daniel Nestor in the final. They won titles at Acapulco, Scottsdale, Newport, and Basel, and were runners-up at Adelaide, Memphis and Washington. They advanced to the semi-finals at Wimbledon for the second straight year. Also, the brothers reached the semi-finals at the US Open (where they lost to Mahesh Bhupathi/Max Mirnyi), Washington, and the Madrid Masters. They finished the season with a 54–19 match record and in third place in the doubles race. The brothers faced each other at the US Open mixed doubles final, with Mike and Lisa Raymond defeating Bob and Katarina Srebotnik.

=== 2003–2006: Breakthrough and dominance ===
2003 was a landmark season for the Bryans. They reached their first Grand Slam final at Roland Garros, where they also won their first Grand Slam title, beating Paul Haarhuis and Yevgeny Kafelnikov in the final, and did not drop a set all through the tournament. They won five titles for the second successive year (Barcelona, Roland Garros, Nottingham, Cincinnati Masters, Tennis Masters Cup).

With their win at Roland Garros, the Bryans set the record for most doubles titles by a brothers team, breaking Tim and Tom Gullikson's mark of 10. They reached the finals of three other tournaments, including the US Open, became the first brothers duo to finish number 1 in the ATP race, and closed the season by winning the title at Tennis Masters Cup, Houston. They also made their Davis Cup debut' for the United States in 2003, in the World Group Playoff tie in Slovak Republic, beating Karol Beck/Dominik Hrbatý in straight sets and helping the US to a 3–2 victory.

In 2004, they won a career-best seven titles, the victories coming at Adelaide, Memphis, Acapulco, Queen's Club, Los Angeles, Basel and Tennis Masters Cup Houston. They also reached four other finals. They were part of the US Tennis Team at the Athens Olympics in 2004, where they lost in the quarter-finals to eventual gold medalists Fernando González and Nicolás Massú of Chile. They finished another successful season by winning the Tennis Masters Cup for the second year running.

In 2005, the Bryans reached all four Grand Slam finals, and though they lost in the first three (Australian Open, Roland Garros and Wimbledon), they won the second Grand Slam of their career at the US Open in front of cheering home fans. They also won tournaments at Scottsdale, Queen's Club and Washington, and made it to the finals at Memphis, Monte Carlo TMS and Rome TMS. In 2006, the twins won the first Grand Slam of the season, the 2006 Australian Open, where they beat Leander Paes of India and Martin Damm of the Czech Republic in the final. They completed the career slam a few months later at Wimbledon, beating Fabrice Santoro and Nenad Zimonjić in four sets in the final.

=== 2007: Davis Cup Champions ===
2007 saw the Bryans win 11 titles. They started losing in the first round of their first tournament, but entered the 2007 Australian Open and won it defeating Jonas Björkman and Max Mirnyi in the final. Björkman and Mirnyi had defeated the Bryans for two years running in the French Open finals. The brothers only lost one set. Their second title of the season came in Las Vegas where the outstanding team beat Jonathan Erlich/Andy Ram. At the 2007 Miami Masters, the twins won the Masters Series title, defeating Martin Damm and Leander Paes. Their fourth title came without a set's loss in Houston, defeating Mark Knowles and Daniel Nestor in the final. The pair won their fifth title on the 2007 ATP Tour and second Masters Series title of the year at the Monte-Carlo Masters- they missed Indian Wells. The team defeated Julien Benneteau and Nicolas Mahut in the final. At the Rome Masters, however, the brothers lost to Fabrice Santoro and Nenad Zimonjić. It was the first Masters Series match that the Bryans lost in 2007.

The Hamburg Masters saw the Bryans beat Paul Hanley and Kevin Ullyett in the final for a sixth title on the 2007 ATP Tour and third Masters Series event of the year. The brothers lost to Lukáš Dlouhý and Pavel Vízner at the 2007 French Open and to Knowles and Nestor at Queen's Club. They lost in the Wimbledon finals to Arnaud Clément and Michaël Llodra, but did avenge Dlouhý/Vízner in the quarter-finals and Santoro/Zimonjić in the semi-finals. The seventh title of their season came in Los Angeles when the tandem defeated Scott Lipsky and David Martin in the final. In Washington, D.C., the team defeated Erlich/Ram in the final. The brothers did not reach the finals in the 2007 Rogers Masters, which is the second time that the Bryans did not reach a 2007 Masters Series final. They lost in the finals of the 2007 Cincinnati Masters to Erlich/Ram and their next event was the 2007 US Open, which the brothers lost in the quarter-finals to Simon Aspelin and Julian Knowle. Each brother lost in the second round of mixed doubles competition. The brothers' ninth title came at the 2007 Madrid Masters, beating Mariusz Fyrstenberg and Marcin Matkowski in the final. Their tenth title of the season came in Basel, where they beat James Blake and Mark Knowles. The brothers won their eleventh title in 2007 at the 2007 Paris Masters, defeating second seeds Daniel Nestor and Nenad Zimonjić in the final.

The Bryans earned the No. 1 spot in the ATP doubles race and thus were entered into the 2007 Tennis Masters Cup. However, Mike had an elbow injury and could not compete.

The brothers won the third rubber in the 2007 Davis Cup finals, defeating Igor Andreev and Nikolay Davydenko of Russia, thereby clinching the Davis Cup title over the country that was the reigning title holder. Andy Roddick prevailed over Dmitry Tursunov and James Blake defeated Mikhail Youzhny. Bob lost his first Davis Cup singles match in the 4th dead rubber, falling to Andreev; and Blake defeated Tursunov in the 5th dead rubber to end the tie at 4–1. Thus, the United States earned its record 32nd title.

=== 2008 ===
The brothers started their season on the 2008 ATP Tour by entering the 2008 Medibank International in Sydney. They survived a quarter-final match against Jonathan Erlich and Andy Ram and later entered the final, falling to Richard Gasquet and Jo-Wilfried Tsonga. The Bryans again made a good appearance at the 2008 Australian Open. The team breezed through their first three rounds before losing to Mahesh Bhupathi and Mark Knowles. Soon afterwards, the Bryans beat Austria's Julian Knowle and Jürgen Melzer in the first round of the 2008 Davis Cup. Mike had to retire against Stefan Koubek in singles, while Bob Bryan defeated Werner Eschauer in three sets for the US to win the tie.

The Bryans lost to Max Mirnyi and Jamie Murray in the 2008 Delray Beach International Tennis Championships final, and to fellow Stanford Alumni Scott Lipsky and David Martin in the final of the 2008 SAP Open in San Jose, California. The Bryans made it to the final of the Tennis Channel Open in Las Vegas, producing wins over Xavier Malisse and Hugo Armando, Chris Guccione and Lleyton Hewitt, and Marcos Baghdatis and Konstantinos Economidis, but went down in the final to Julien Benneteau and Michaël Llodra. The brothers lost in the quarter-finals of the 2008 Indian Wells Masters to Mirnyi and Murray once more.

The brothers captured their first title of the season at the 2008 Miami Masters, beating Bhupathi and Knowles. After this, they lost in their Davis Cup match to Arnaud Clément and Llodra. They lost to Jeff Coetzee and Wesley Moodie at the 2008 Monte-Carlo Masters, however, they then claimed a second title on the 2008 ATP Tour in Barcelona at the 2008 Torneo Godó, beating Mariusz Fyrstenberg and Marcin Matkowski to win the final. At the Rome Masters, they beat Daniel Nestor and Nenad Zimonjić to claim the title. This made the Indian Wells Masters as the only ATP Masters Series to have escaped them.

The brothers moved on to the 2008 Hamburg Masters, where they only lost one set before reaching the final. However, Nestor and Zimonjić claimed the title. Then, two weeks later, the brothers entered the 2008 French Open. Their second Grand Slam of the year looked to be a strong one, however they fell to Pablo Cuevas and Luis Horna in the quarter-finals. Again, they lost at the 2008 Queen's Club Championships to Marcelo Melo and André Sá, whom they had beaten in Hamburg. Another Grand Slam setback occurred for them at the 2008 Wimbledon Championships, when the twins lost in the semi-finals in a tight match against Jonas Björkman and Kevin Ullyett. They played opposite each other at the Wimbledon mixed doubles final. Bob and Samantha Stosur defeated Mike and Katarina Srebotnik. The brothers played their way into tournaments, as they reached the final of the 2008 Canada Masters, where they lost to Nestor and Zimonjić. Their losses ended at the 2008 Cincinnati Masters, when they came from behind to beat Bhupathi and Knowles. They won the title with a comeback against Israel's Erlich and Ram, earning themselves two successive wins coming back from the loss of the first set.

The brothers combined at the 2008 Beijing Olympics. After losing to singles specialists and eventual gold medalists Roger Federer and Stanislas Wawrinka, they beat Clément and Llodra 3–6, 6–3, 6–4 to win the bronze medal. The brothers did not appear again until the 2008 US Open, where they won the title. They then lost in the quarter-finals of the 2008 Madrid Masters to Björkman and Ullyett. At the 2008 Tennis Masters Cup in Shanghai, they reached the final, only to be defeated by Nestor and Zimonjić and so to lose their positions as world Number 1s for the first time in three years.

=== 2009 ===
In January, the brothers entered the Medibank International, in Sydney, Australia, defeating Simone Bolelli and Andreas Seppi, and in the quarter-final, Tommy Robredo and Feliciano López in straight sets. They survived a semi-final match against Mahesh Bhupathi and Mark Knowles. They avenged their Tennis Masters Cup doubles final loss with a win over Daniel Nestor and Nenad Zimonjić to win their first Medibank International doubles title in 10 years. At the season's first Grand Slam, in Melbourne, the Australian Open, the brothers won the men's Doubles final, on Saturday, January 31, defeating India's Mahesh Bhupathi and Mark Knowles from the Bahamas in three sets. The outcome was historical in that it was the first time in tennis history that siblings had won both categories of Doubles titles – men's and women's – at a Major, as Venus and Serena Williams had won the Women's Doubles title at the Australian Open the previous night. At the Delray Beach International Tennis Championships, they defeated second seeds Marcelo Melo and André Sá for their third title of the year and to win the tournament for the first time ever.

The broke the US record for most wins in Davis Cup doubles as a pair with 15 wins when they beat the Swiss team of Stanislas Wawrinka and Yves Allegro in the 2009 Davis Cup 1st round. Mike Bryan got one more win in Davis cup doubles (total 16) with Mardy Fish when his brother Bob was out of play due to injury in the 2008 semi-finals. At the U.S. Men's Clay Court Championships in Houston, they beat fellow Americans Jesse Levine and Ryan Sweeting to win their fourth title of the year. At the Barcelona Open Banco Sabadell and Internazionali BNL d'Italia, they failed to defend their titles as they lost to Bhupathi and Knowles and to Nestor and Zimonjic in the semi-finals and final respectively. They exited the French Open in the semi-finals to South African-Belgian pair Wesley Moodie and Dick Norman after losing three match points. They were seeded first at Wimbledon, where they reached the final without dropping a set. however, they lost the final against arch-rivals Nestor and Zimonjic in four sets. They started their US Open Series and North American hard-court season by winning the LA Tennis Open over Benjamin Becker and Frank Moser of Germany. They were the defending champions at the 2009 US Open and lost in the quarter-finals to Lukáš Dlouhý and Leander Paes in a re-match of the 2008 final despite saving five match points.

The brothers won their next ATP World Tour 500 title in Beijing. The next week, they competed at the eighth Masters 1000 tournament of the year, the Shanghai Masters, but lost in the quarter-finals. They then competed in Basel as a warm-up tournament before Paris and London. They reached the final but lost to Daniel Nestor and Nenad Zimonjić. At Paris, they lost at the quarter-finals. However, they captured the Barclays ATP World Tour Finals to end the year as the World No. 1 Doubles Team for the fifth time and capture the Year-end championships for the third time. The year 2009 was the first year since 2004 where the brothers did not win any ATP World Tour Masters 1000 tournaments.

=== 2010 ===
The brothers began 2010 playing at the 2010 Heineken Open in Auckland. However, the pair lost in the first round. They then went on successfully defending their title at the 2010 Australian Open, beating Daniel Nestor and Nenad Zimonjić in the final, thus claiming their fourth Australian Open title and eighth major title. They also defended their titles at the 2010 Delray Beach International Tennis Championships (where they earned their 600th victory as a team) and the U.S. Men's Clay Court Championships in Houston. The brothers participated in the first round of Davis Cup, where they were drawn to face Serbia in Belgrade on clay courts. Mike had to withdraw due to food poisoning and was replaced by John Isner. Bob and Isner won the doubles rubber in five sets against Janko Tipsarević and Zimonjić. However, the US lost the tie 3–2 (with the last rubber being a dead rubber). The brothers then won two back to back Masters Series titles during the European clay tour at the 2010 Internazionali BNL d'Italia in Rome and the 2010 Mutua Madrileña Madrid Open. They defeated compatriots Isner and Sam Querrey in Rome, and co-world No. 1s Nestor and Zimonjić in Madrid. This ended their ATP World Tour Masters 1000 title drought since August 2008 and equalled The Woodies' record of 61 doubles titles.

Seeded first at the 2010 French Open, the Bryans suffered their earliest exit at a Grand Slam since the 2001 US Open by losing to Marcelo Melo and Bruno Soares in the second round. They did not compete in any of the warm-up tournaments before Wimbledon. At Wimbledon, however, the defending champions Nestor and Zimonjić made an early exit, creating the possibility for the brothers to regain the No. 1 doubles teaming, but lost to Wesley Moodie and Dick Norman in the quarter-finals.

To start their 2010 North American summer hard-court swing, the brothers won their 62nd career doubles title at their hometown tournament in Los Angeles, where they were the defending champions. They reached the final and became the first team in the Open Era to reach 100 doubles finals. The win surpassed the Woodies record of 61 wins as a team. Their next target is the all-time record of 79 set by Pam Shriver and Martina Navratilova. They next participated in the 2010 Legg Mason Tennis Classic in Washington, D.C., where they lost in the quarter-finals to Rohan Bopanna and Aisam-ul-Haq Qureshi.

The brothers continued their ATP World Tour Masters 1000 winning streak by capturing their 63rd title at the 2010 Rogers Cup in Toronto, adding to their titles in 2002 and 2006 and their 64th title at the 2010 Western & Southern Financial Group Masters in Cincinnati, adding to their titles in 2003 and 2008. This ensured their return to the No. 1 spot in the team rankings. This marked their wins in four consecutive Masters 1000 tournaments. Their winning streak continued as they won the 2010 US Open, giving the brothers a ninth major title, just two shy from the Woodies, by beating Bopanna and Qureshi in the final. On September 6, 2010, they were ranked number one in doubles based on the ATP ranking system for 205 weeks, surpassing Todd Woodbridge's previous record of 204 weeks.

Playing in the 2010 China Open in Beijing to start their Asian hard-court swing, their first tournament after their Flushing Meadows victory, they extended their winning streak to 18–0 with a victory in the final over Mariusz Fyrstenberg and Marcin Matkowski. It was noted that they won their tenth title of the season on October 10, 2010. After this successful title defense, their next tournament was the 2010 Shanghai Rolex Masters where their winning streak ended at 20 after losing to Jürgen Melzer and Leander Paes in the semi-finals. The Bryans then participated at the 2010 Davidoff Swiss Indoors where the clinched the year-end no.1 ranking by reaching the semi-finals. They ended up winning their 11th title of the year in their 11th final by beating defending champions Nestor and Zimonjić in the final. They capped up their season by losing to Mark Knowles and Andy Ram in the semi-finals of the 2010 BNP Paribas Masters in Paris, and to Nestor and Zimonjić in the Barclays ATP World Tour Finals.

=== 2011 ===
The brothers began 2011 at the 2011 Medibank International Sydney where they reached the final. The pair lost to first-time pairing of Lukáš Dlouhý and Paul Hanley, marking their first final loss since March 2008 to a team other than Nestor/Zimonjic. They next traveled to Melbourne and successfully defended their 2011 Australian Open title, beating Indian duo Mahesh Bhupathi and Leander Paes in the final. This was the Bryans' third straight title at the Australian Open (and their fifth overall), and their tenth Grand Slam title (just one shy from the Woodies).

They suffered early exits in Acapulco, Indian Wells and Miami but bounced back to win their 69th title in Houston. They followed this victory with their 70th title in Monte Carlo the week after. This was their 18th Masters 1000 title, tying them with Todd Woodbridge and six shy of all-time Masters 1000 leader Daniel Nestor. Their next tournament was the 2011 Barcelona Open Banco Sabadell, where they ended as runners-up to first time pairing of Santiago González and Scott Lipsky after missing four match points in a closely fought final. They continued their clay court dominance by winning (and defending) their fourth Madrid Masters title beating Michaël Llodra and Nenad Zimonjić in the final. It was the Bryans' 19th Masters title.

Their next tournament was the Rome Masters, where they lost in the quarter-finals to compatriots Mardy Fish and Andy Roddick. They lost in the 2011 French Open semi-finals to first-time pairing of Juan Sebastián Cabal and Eduardo Schwank. They bounced back, clinching their fourth Queen's Club title, beating fellow Australian Open finalists Bhupathi/Paes in the final in a tough three-setter. They followed this up winning Wimbledon on July 2, defeating Robert Lindstedt and Horia Tecău in straight sets. This was their second Wimbledon title and tied The Woodies' record of 11 Grand Slam titles.

The brothers failed to defend their title at the Rogers Cup although they reached the final and lost to Llodra and Zimonjic in three sets. Their next stop was at the Cincinnati where they again failed to defend their title by falling to Bhupathi/Paes in the semi-finals. Their late season struggles continued at the US Open, losing in the first round. This was their first first round exit since the 2001 Australian Open. At the 2011 China Open in Beijing they were, again, unable to defend their title as they were beaten in the semi-finals by Llodra and Zimonjic in three sets. They lost the 2011 Shanghai Rolex Masters quarter-finals to Mariusz Fyrstenberg and Marcin Matkowski.

The brothers played their next tournament at the Erste Bank Open in Vienna (their first appearance there since 2002) where they re-gained some form by saving a match point in a tight first round before going on to reach the final where they defeated Max Mirnyi and Daniel Nestor in straight sets to claim their first Vienna title and their 7th title of the year (which was also their first title since Wimbledon).

They then competed in the Valencia Open 500 event in the very next week and rode their momentum without dropping a set into their first final there against Eric Butorac and Jean-Julien Rojer. They went on to win the final in straight sets to earn their first Valencia title and 8th title of the season. However, they were unable to make it three titles in three weeks at the 2011 BNP Paribas Masters as they were upset in the second round by Julien Benneteau and Nicolas Mahut. The brothers looked to finish their season strongly at the Barclays ATP World Tour Finals but lost in the semi-finals to Mirnyi and Nestor.

=== 2012: Record breakers ===
The brothers began 2012 by participating at the 2012 Apia International Sydney where they reached the final. They went on to win the final by defeating wild cards Matthew Ebden and Jarkko Nieminen to claim their second title in Sydney and their 76th overall without dropping a set. The brothers then aimed to win their sixth Australian Open and reached their eighth final at the event after three consecutive three-setters which included saving a match point and overcoming a 2–5 deficit in the final set tie-break in an epic semi-final against Robert Lindstedt and Horia Tecău. However, the brothers played Leander Paes and Radek Štěpánek in the final and were upset in straight sets.

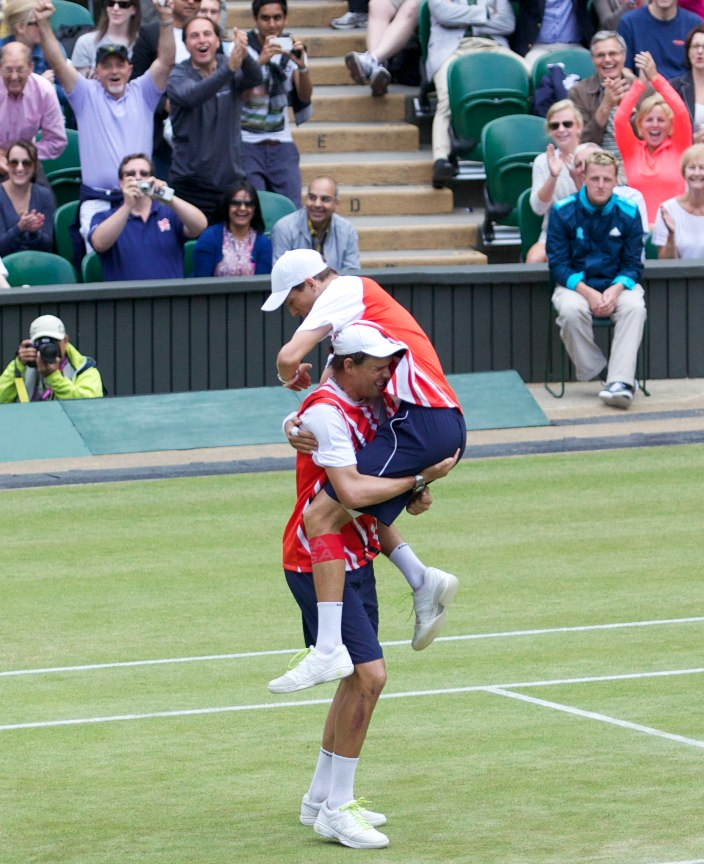
The Bryan Brothers win a gold medal in London.

They were forced to withdraw from Indian Wells at the quarter-final stage with illness and were beaten in Miami at the semi-final stage by Paes and Štěpánek for the second time in 2012. They skipped Houston despite being the defending champions and instead secured a doubles rubber point in the USA-France Davis Cup tie at Monte-Carlo by defeating Julien Benneteau and Michaël Llodra. They then went on to win their 20th Masters 1000 title and 77th title overall at Monte Carlo without dropping a set. They had thrashed Paes and Štěpánek in the quarter-finals and comfortably beaten Max Mirnyi and Daniel Nestor in the final. However, their momentum was halted at the 2012 Barcelona Open Banc Sabadell, with their withdrawal due to illness. They took to the new blue clay of the Madrid Masters as the defending champions but lost early. Their next tournament was the Rome Masters, where they lost in the quarter-finals.

Keen to regain some momentum, the brothers played the 2012 Open de Nice Côte d'Azur – Doubles tournament which they won for the first time by beating Oliver Marach and Filip Polášek in the final. It was their 78th title and third of the year. They then enjoyed a good run at the 2012 French Open before losing in the final to Mirnyi and Nestor. They immediately found form on the grass, reaching the final at the Queen's Club but failed to defend their title and were again defeated by Mirnyi and Nestor. The brothers reached the semi-finals of Wimbledon but, after a tight match, were defeated by eventual first-time wildcard titlists Jonathan Marray and Frederik Nielsen. After winning the Olympic gold medal at the Summer Olympics in London (see the '2012 Olympics' section below), the brothers played the 2012 Rogers Cup in Toronto. They maintained their fine form by winning their 21st Masters 1000 title and their 80th title overall after saving a match point in a closely fought final against Spaniards Marcel Granollers and Marc López.

The brothers went on to the 2012 Western & Southern Open in Cincinnati, where they lost in the semi-finals to Lindstedt and Tecău. They went on to win the 2012 US Open over Paes and Štěpánek (who had beaten the Bryans in the final of the Australian Open earlier in the year). This was the brothers' 12th major title, which meant they had surpassed the Woodies' record of 11, giving the brothers the most major titles in men's doubles in the Open Era. In November, Bob Bryan, who had missed a Davis Cup match due to the birth of his daughter, during which Mike had played with Mardy Fish, slipped behind Mike in the world rankings. This was the first time since August 2003 that the pair had had different rankings. This meant Mike Bryan finished 2012 as world No. 1 on his own.

==== 2012 Olympics ====
They returned to Wimbledon for the Summer Olympics Tennis Tournament. They beat Bellucci/Sa of Brazil in the first round, Davydenko/Youzhny of Russia in the second round, Erlich/Ram of Israel in the quarterfinals, and Benneteau/Gasquet of France in the semi-finals. They entered the Gold Medal Match assured of at least a silver medal, but defeated Llodra/Tsonga of France to win the Olympic gold medal on August 4, 2012. This completed the career Golden Slam in men's doubles for the brothers, having won the Australian Open, French Open, Wimbledon, US Open and the Olympic gold medal.

=== 2013: Non-calendar Golden Slam ===
The brothers started 2013 by participating at the 2013 Apia International Sydney which they won by defeating Max Mirnyi and Horia Tecău in the final to claim their third title in Sydney and their 83rd overall. The Bryans then aimed to win their sixth Australian Open. They did just that by emerging victorious in their ninth final at the event by beating the Dutch team of Robin Haase and Igor Sijsling. This gave the brothers an all-time record 13 Grand Slam titles. They surpassed the pre-Open Era record of 12 titles held by John Newcombe and Tony Roche.

The brothers participated in the first round of the Davis Cup, where they were drawn to face Brazil in Jacksonville on indoor hard-courts. For only the third time in their career, the Bryans lost a Davis Cup doubles match when they lost in five sets to Marcelo Melo and Bruno Soares. It was their first loss of the season. However, the US would go on to win the tie 3–2 when Sam Querrey won the deciding rubber. They then played at the 2013 SAP Open in San Jose, California. It was the final edition of the tournament and therefore, the Bryans' last chance to win this tournament which had so far eluded them. However, they lost in the quarter-finals to the Australian pairing of Lleyton Hewitt and Marinko Matosevic. They bounced back immediately at the 2013 Regions Morgan Keegan Championships in Memphis. They won their third title of the season without dropping a set winning an all-American final against James Blake and Jack Sock. Following this win, Bob rejoined Mike as World No. 1.

Their next tournament was the first Masters 1000 of the year at Indian Wells. This was the only Masters 1000 tournament that the Bryans had yet to win. The brothers rode their momentum and won the tournament after prevailing in super-tiebreakers in the quarter-final, the semi-final, and in the final against first-time pairing Treat Huey and Jerzy Janowicz. This was their 22nd Masters 1000 title, their 4th title of the year, and their 86th title as a team. Their next tournament was the 2013 Sony Ericsson Open in Miami, Florida where they lost in the first round to Max Mirnyi and Mikhail Youzhny.

The brothers then played in Boise, Idaho in the Davis Cup quarter-finals against Serbia on indoor hard-courts. However, the twins lost in five sets (15–13 in the fifth) to Nenad Zimonjić and Ilija Bozoljac. It was the first-time in their career that they had lost back-to-back Davis Cup doubles rubbers and it was their fourth loss overall in the competition. This defeat put the US 2–1 behind in rubbers. They were unable to recover and lost the tie 3–1 when Novak Djokovic beat Sam Querrey in the first reverse singles match.

Their next tournament was Houston where they were defending champions and on a 16 match winning streak. However, their streak came to an end in the final where, despite having a match point, they were defeated by Jamie Murray and John Peers. Their next event was Monte Carlo where again, they were the defending champions. However, once again, they lost in the final after squandering seven match points against Julien Benneteau and Nenad Zimonjić. Their next event was the Madrid Masters which had reverted to red clay. The brothers reached the final against Alexander Peya and Bruno Soares. There were no missed match points this time as the Bryans closed out a comfortable win to earn their 23rd Masters 1000 title and 5th title of the year. They continued their fine run at the Rome Masters defeating Indians Mahesh Bhupathi and Rohan Bopanna in the final. It was their 88th team title, their 6th title in 2013, and their 24th Masters 1000 title.

The brothers' clay-court form culminated in a 14th Grand Slam title at the 2013 French Open. They defeated the all-French pairing of Michaël Llodra and Nicolas Mahut in a third-set tiebreak to claim their second French Open title and 7th title of the year. It was their 89th team title and 3rd consecutive Grand Slam title.

On June 10, it was announced that the twins had qualified for the Barclays ATP World Tour Finals for the 12th time. The brothers got their grass-court campaign underway at the Queen's Club. They won their fifth Queen's Club title by defeating Peya and Soares in the final. It was their 8th title of the season and 90th title overall. They were on an 18 match winning streak going into Wimbledon.

On July 6, the brothers achieved a historic Golden Slam as they won their 15th Grand Slam title and third Wimbledon. The twins became the second doubles team in history to hold all four majors at the same time (the only other team was the Australian duo of Ken McGregor and Frank Sedgman who achieved the Calendar Grand Slam in 1951). By defeating Ivan Dodig and Marcelo Melo in the final, they became as well as the first team to hold all four major titles and the Olympic gold medal at the same time.

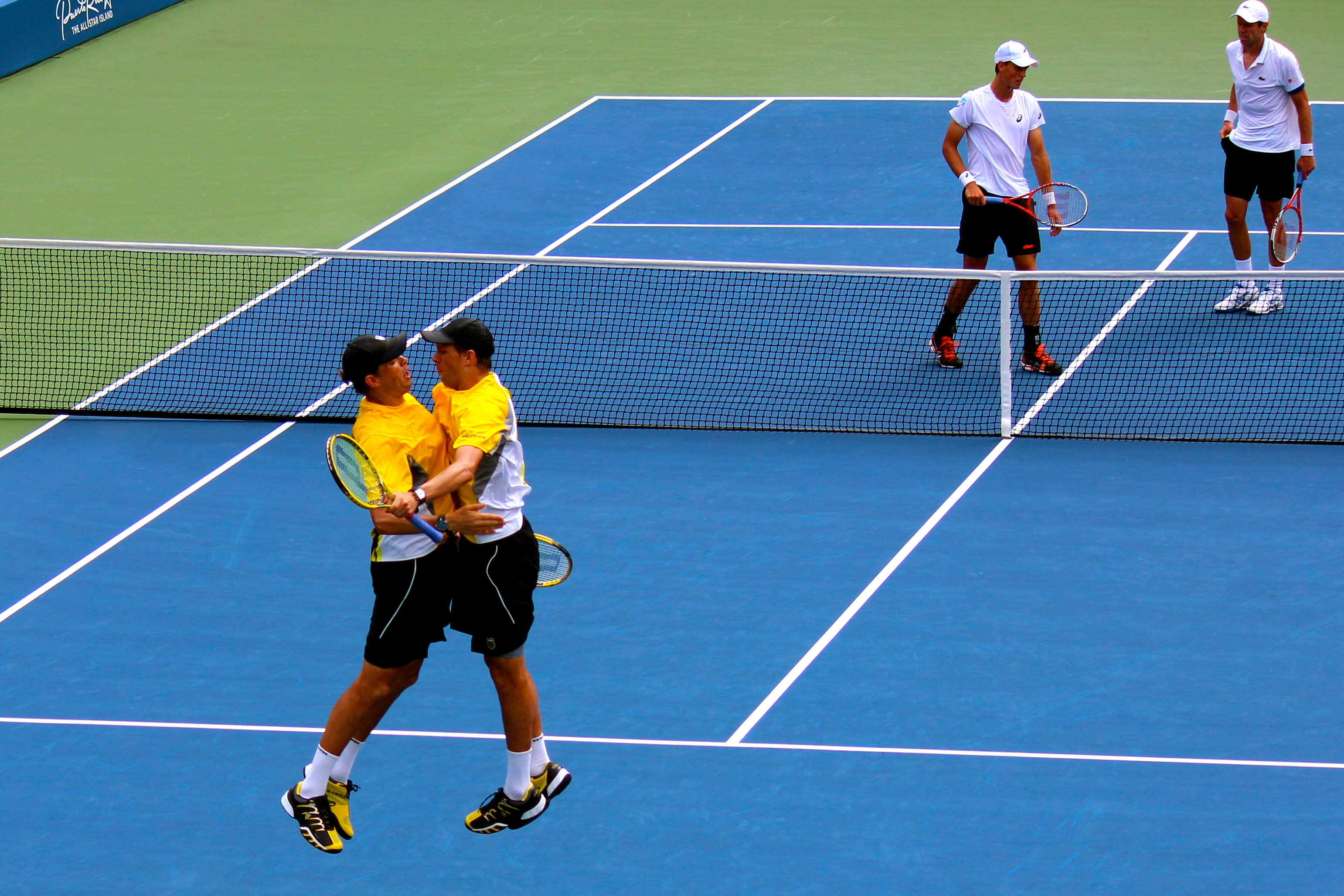
The Bryan Brothers triumphant at the 2013 US Open.

The brothers withdrew from the 2013 BB&T Atlanta Open and the 2013 Citi Open in Washington citing an injury to Bob's shoulder. Their next event was the 2013 Rogers Cup in Montreal where they were the defending champions. However, their 25 match winning streak came to an end in the quarter-finals, losing to Robert Lindstedt and Daniel Nestor. At the 2013 Western & Southern Open in Cincinnati they saved a match point in the semi-finals before defeating Spaniards Marcel Granollers and Marc López in the final. It was the brothers' 10th title of 2013 and 25th Masters 1000 title. With this victory, the twins were guaranteed the year-end No. 1 team ranking for a record 9th time on August 19.

However, at the 2013 US Open, the Bryans were defeated in the semi-finals by Leander Paes and Radek Štěpánek in a rematch of the previous year's final. This loss prevented them from achieving the Calendar Grand Slam. Their next event was the Japan Open. It was the twins' first time competing in this tournament but things did not go as planned as they were defeated in their opening match by Nicolás Almagro and Pablo Cuevas. Their next tournament was the 2013 Shanghai Rolex Masters where they were beaten in the semi-finals by Dodig and Melo. The brothers played the Valencia Open where they were defeated in the final by Peya and Soares despite having 4 match points. The brothers beat Peya and Soares in the final of the 2013 BNP Paribas Masters for their 26th Masters 1000 title. Their final event was the Barclays ATP World Tour Finals where they saved a match point en route to the final before being defeated by Spaniards David Marrero and Fernando Verdasco. This loss brought to a close the greatest season of the brothers' career where they reached 15 finals, won 11 titles (including 3 majors and 5 Masters 1000 titles), and finished world No. 1 for the 9th time.

=== 2014: Six Masters titles ===
The Bryan brothers began 2014 attempting to defend their title at the 2014 Apia International Sydney. However, they were upset in the quarter-finals by Lukáš Rosol and João Sousa. The brothers aimed to defend their Australian Open crown but were shocked in the third round by eventual finalists, Eric Butorac and Raven Klaasen. The twins participated in the first round of the Davis Cup where they were drawn to face Great Britain in San Diego on outdoor clay. They secured a point for the United States by winning the doubles rubber against Colin Fleming and Dominic Inglot. For Mike, it was the 35-year-old's 23rd doubles victory in the competition – the most by an American.

The brothers reached the final of the 2014 U.S. National Indoor Tennis Championships in Memphis, Tennessee but were unable to defend their title, losing again by Butorac and Klaasen. They bounced back at the 2014 Delray Beach International Tennis Championships which they won without dropping a set to claim their first title of the season. Their next tournament was the first Masters 1000 of the year at Indian Wells where the brothers successfully defended their title by defeating Alexander Peya and Bruno Soares in the final. The twins immediately followed this up by winning Miami. They defeated Juan Sebastián Cabal and Robert Farah in the final to claim their first Indian Wells-Miami double, their 28th Masters 1000 crown, and 96th title overall.

The brothers got their clay-court campaign off to a flying start by claiming their fifth Houston title defeating Spaniards David Marrero and Fernando Verdasco in a closely fought final. At Monte Carlo, the brothers won their 29th Masters 1000 crown and 4th consecutive Masters 1000 tournament by beating Ivan Dodig and Marcelo Melo in the final. This title marked their 98th title as a team and Mike's 100th doubles title. The twins had now won five consecutive tournaments and were on a 21 match winning streak. However, this streak came to an end in the final of the Madrid Masters where they were defeated by Daniel Nestor and Nenad Zimonjić. The twins' next event was the Rome Masters, where they were beaten again by Nestor and Zimonjić in the semi-finals. The brothers tried to defend their title at the 2014 French Open but were defeated in the quarter-finals by Marcel Granollers and Marc López.

The brothers began their grass-court campaign attempting to defend their title at Queens. However, they were defeated in the second round by Jamie Murray and John Peers. At Wimbledon, the Bryan brothers reached the final, where they were beaten in five sets by the doubles team of Vasek Pospisil of Canada and Jack Sock of the United States.

The brothers were then defeated in the quarter-finals of the 2014 Citi Open in Washington by Steve Johnson (tennis) and Sam Querrey. At the 2014 Rogers Cup in Toronto, they were beaten in their opening match by Marin Čilić and Santiago González. They then went on to avenge their Wimbledon final loss by defeating Pospisil and Sock in the final of the 2014 Western & Southern Open to claim their 30th Masters 1000 crown and 99th team title. The Bryans continued their winning streak at the 2014 US Open where they won their 16th major title, a record 5th US Open, and a ground-breaking 100th doubles title as a team. The twins defeated the all-Spanish pairing of Granollers and López in the final to ensure that they have now won at least won one major title per year for a record 10 consecutive years.

Having kept the United States in the World Group of the Davis Cup by beating Norbert Gombos and Lukáš Lacko in a play-off against Slovakia, the Bryan brothers did not begin the Asian swing well. Like last year, the twins were defeated in their opening match at the Japan Open- this time, by lucky losers and eventual champions Pierre-Hugues Herbert and Michał Przysiężny. However, the Bryans responded in style by winning the 2014 Shanghai Rolex Masters for the first time after defeating Roland Garros champions Julien Benneteau and Édouard Roger-Vasselin in the final. This was the twins' 31st Masters 1000 title and 101st title overall. However, most significantly, the victory meant that the Bryan brothers became the first doubles team to achieve a "Career Golden Masters" as they have now won all nine current ATP World Tour Masters 1000 tournaments. The victory meant the brothers had secured the year-end No. 1 team ranking for the sixth consecutive year and 10th time overall (both records). The Bryans continued their fine run by defeating Marcin Matkowski and Jürgen Melzer in the final of the 2014 BNP Paribas Masters to capture their 32nd Masters 1000 title. The win meant that the twins became the first players in singles or doubles to win six Masters 1000 crowns in a single season (Novak Djokovic would go on to equal this feat in the 2015 season).

At the Barclays ATP World Tour Finals, the Bryans lost their opening group match to Australian Open champions Łukasz Kubot and Robert Lindstedt. They rebounded by defeating Jean-Julien Rojer and Horia Tecău,followed by Peya and Soares to qualify for the semi-finals. The twins then defeated the all-French pairing of Benneteau and Roger-Vasselin to reach the final. In the last match of the year, the Bryans defeated Dodig and Melo to claim their fourth World Tour Finals crown which represented their 10th title of the season.. They would finish as the year-end No. 1 team for a 6th consecutive year and 10th overall, both records.

=== 2015: Decline ===
The Bryan brothers began their year at the Heineken Open in Auckland where they were beaten in their opening match by Andre Begemann and Robin Haase after a disputed line-call when the twins were match point up. The Bryans' early season struggles continued as they were upset in the third round of the 2015 Australian Open by Dominic Inglot and Florin Mergea. It was the first time that the Bryan brothers had made consecutive pre-quarter-final exits at a major since Roland Garros (2000–2001).

They responded by successfully defending their title at the 2015 Delray Beach International Tennis Championships by defeating Raven Klaasen and Leander Paes in the final. However, their momentum was stalled in the quarter-finals of the 2015 Dubai Tennis Championships where they were beaten again by Inglot and Mergea. The twins participated in the first round of the Davis Cup where they were drawn to face Great Britain in Glasgow on indoor hard-court. Although it proved to be in vain, they kept the tie alive by winning the doubles rubber in five sets against Jamie Murray and Dominic Inglot.

The next tournament for the brothers was the first Masters 1000 of the year at Indian Wells where they were the two-time defending champions. However, their streak at the tournament was snapped in the quarter-finals by eventual champions Vasek Pospisil and Jack Sock. However, at the Miami Open they defeated Pospisil and Sock in the final to defend the title and claim their second title of the season.

The brothers got their clay-court campaign off to a slow start by losing in the quarter-finals of Houston to eventual champions Teymuraz Gabashvili and Ričardas Berankis. This was their earliest defeat at this ATP World Tour 250-level tournament since losing in the same round in 2006.

However, the Bryans responded well by successfully defending their title in Monte Carlo by defeating Australian Open champions Simone Bolelli and Fabio Fognini in the final. However, their inconsistent year continued with back-to-back second round exits at the Madrid Masters and the Rome Masters. Despite these early losses, the twins reached the final of the 2015 French Open. However, despite leading by a set and a break at one stage, the Bryans were ultimately defeated in three tight sets by Ivan Dodig and Marcelo Melo.

At Wimbledon, the Bryans were beaten in the quarter-finals by Rohan Bopanna and Florin Mergea. The Bryans began the North American hard court season in fine fashion by winning their first title in Atlanta, defeating Colin Fleming and Gilles Müller in the final. The Bryans followed this with a triumph at the 2015 Citi Open over Dodig and Melo in the final. Their momentum continued at the 2015 Rogers Cup in Montreal where they defeated Daniel Nestor and Édouard Roger-Vasselin in the final to claim a 5th title in Canada, 35th Masters 1000 title and 6th title of the season.

However, Nestor and Roger-Vasselin would defeat the Bryans in the quarter-finals of the 2015 Western & Southern Open the following week. The Bryan Brothers were stunned in the first round of the 2015 US Open by countrymen Steve Johnson and Sam Querrey. It was only their second loss in the first round of a major since 2001 and marked the first season since 2004 in which the Bryans had not won at least one major title.

The Bryan brothers began the Asian swing poorly. For the third consecutive year, they were defeated in their opening match at the Japan Open- this time, by Juan-Sebastian Cabal and Robert Farah. The twins would lose to Cabal and Farah again in their opening match at the 2015 Shanghai Rolex Masters.

On November 2, their record streak of 139 consecutive weeks at number 1 as a team came to an end as they were surpassed by Melo. It marked the first time since 9 September 2012 that neither brother had reigned in the top spot. The twins were then beaten in the quarter-finals of the 2015 BNP Paribas Masters by Pospisil and Sock.

At the Barclays ATP World Tour Finals, the Bryans lost their opening group match to Bopanna and Mergea. However, they rebounded by beating Bolelli and Fognini, and Jamie Murray and John Peers (after saving 5 match points) to qualify for the semi-finals. They then faced Jean-Julien Rojer and Horia Tecău in a match that would decide the year-end No. 1 team ranking – the Bryans were defeated in straight sets.

=== 2016 ===
The brothers began their year at the 2016 Apia International Sydney where they were beaten in their opening match by Jonathan Erlich and Colin Fleming. The Bryans were then upset in the third round of the 2016 Australian Open by Raven Klaasen and Rajeev Ram. The twins were beaten in their opening match at the 2016 Memphis Open by Austin Krajicek and Nicholas Monroe. The brothers reached the final of the 2016 Delray Beach International Tennis Championships but squandered six championship points before losing to Oliver Marach and Fabrice Martin. The Bryans competed in the first round of the 2016 Davis Cup World Group and gave the United States a 2–1 edge over Australia after a five-set win over Lleyton Hewitt and John Peers on the grass in Melbourne.

The brothers were beaten in the quarter-finals of Indian Wells by Édouard Roger-Vasselin and Nenad Zimonjić. The Bryans were up 9–2 in the Match Tie-break, but squandered seven match points in a row (and eight overall) before losing. The twins were unable to defend their title at the 2016 Miami Open as they were beaten in the semi-finals by eventual champions Pierre-Hugues Herbert and Nicolas Mahut.

The brothers saved two match points in their opening match and went on to defeat Víctor Estrella Burgos and Santiago González in the final to claim their sixth Houston title. This was their first title of the year and 110th overall.

Coming off their win in Houston, they looked to build on momentum. However, they failed to defend their title in Monte Carlo, losing in their opening match to Juan Sebastián Cabal and Robert Farah. The Bryans bounced back by defeating Pablo Cuevas and Marcel Granollers in the final of the 2016 Barcelona Open Banc Sabadell to claim their third Barcelona title.

At the Madrid Masters, the twins were beaten in the quarter-finals by the in-form Herbert and Mahut. Having saved three match points in their opening match, the Bryan Brothers went on to win the Rome Masters by beating Vasek Pospisil and Jack Sock in the final. This was their 36th Masters 1000 title and 112th title overall. The brothers saved one match point en route to the final of the 2016 French Open. However, they were defeated in the final by the all-Spanish pairing of Feliciano López and Marc López.

The brothers began their grass-court season at the 2016 Stuttgart Open where they were defeated in the semi-finals by Marach and Martin. At the 2016 Gerry Weber Open, the Bryans were beaten in the semi-finals by defending and eventual champions Klaasen and Ram. At Wimbledon, the twins were beaten once again by Klaasen and Ram in the quarter-finals. The Bryans began the North American hard court season attempting to defend their title at the 2016 Rogers Cup. However, they were beaten in the quarter-finals by Florin Mergea and Horia Tecău. The brothers withdrew from the Rio Olympics because of concerns over the zica virus. The twins reached the semi-finals of the 2016 Western & Southern Open where they were defeated by Jean-Julien Rojer and Horia Tecău. The Bryans were defeated in the quarter-finals of the 2016 US Open by Feliciano López and Marc López, in the last match ever played at the old Louis Armstrong Stadium.

=== 2019–2020: Retirement ===
On November 13, 2019, the brothers announced that they would retire from professional tennis after the 2020 season, concluding with the US Open. The Bryans ultimately retired a fortnight earlier than expected, due to the negative impact of the COVID-19 pandemic on the North American hardcourt swing.

== Performance timeline ==
Key
W	F	SF	QF	#R	RR	Q#	P#	DNQ	A	Z#	PO	G	S	B	NMS	NTI	P	NH

(W) winner; (F) finalist; (SF) semifinalist; (QF) quarterfinalist; (#R) rounds 4, 3, 2, 1; (RR) round-robin stage; (Q#) qualification round; (P#) preliminary round; (DNQ) did not qualify; (A) absent; (Z#) Davis/Fed Cup Zonal Group (with number indication) or (PO) play-off; (G) gold, (S) silver or (B) bronze Olympic/Paralympic medal; (NMS) not a Masters tournament; (NTI) not a Tier I tournament; (P) postponed; (NH) not held; (SR) strike rate (events won / competed); (W–L) win–loss record.

Tournament	1995	1996	1997	1998	1999	2000	2001	2002	2003	2004	2005	2006	2007	2008	2009	2010	2011	2012	2013	2014	2015	2016	2017	2018	2019	2020	SR	W–L	Win%
Grand Slam tournaments
Australian Open	A	A	A	A	A	1R	1R	QF	3R	F	F	W	W	QF	W	W	W	F	W	3R	3R	3R	F	SF	QF	3R	6 / 21	77–15	84%
French Open	A	A	A	A	2R	2R	2R	QF	W	SF	F	F	QF	QF	SF	2R	SF	F	W	QF	F	F	2R	A	3R	A	2 / 20	68–18	79%
Wimbledon	A	A	A	A	3R	1R	SF	SF	QF	3R	F	W	F	SF	F	QF	W	SF	W	F	QF	QF	2R	A	3R	NH	3 / 20	72–17	81%
US Open	1R	1R	1R	1R	1R	QF	2R	SF	F	3R	W	3R	QF	W	SF	W	1R	W	SF	W	1R	QF	SF	A	3R	A	5 / 24	67–19	78%
Win–loss	0–1	0–1	0–1	0–1	3–3	4–4	6–4	14–4	14–3	13–4	21–3	18–2	17–3	16–3	19–3	16–2	16–2	20–3	22–1	16–3	10–4	13–4	11–4	4–1	9–4	2–1	16 / 85	284–69	80%
Year-end championship
ATP Finals	Did not qualify						RR	NH	W	W	SF	RR	A	F	W	SF	SF	RR	F	W	SF	SF	RR	A	A	DNQ	4 / 15	36–23	61%
National representation
Olympics	NH	DNQ	Not Held			DNQ	Not Held			QF	Not Held			SF-B	Not Held			G	Not Held			A	Not Held				1 / 3	11–2	85%
Davis Cup	DNQ	DNQ	DNQ	DNQ	DNQ	DNQ	PO	F	1R	SF	W	SF	QF	A	QF	SF	QF	1R	1R	QF	A	A	A	QR	1 / 12	25–5	83%		
Win–loss	0–0	0–0	0–0	0–0	0–0	0–0	0–0	0–0	1–0	6–1	1–1	3–0	4–0	5–2	2–0	0–0	2–0	7–0	0–2	2–0	1–0	1–1	0–0	0–0	0–0	1–0	2 / 15	36–7	84%
ATP Tour Masters 1000
Indian Wells	A	A	A	A	QF	1R	1R	QF	F	2R	SF	F	1R	QF	SF	1R	2R	QF	W	W	QF	QF	1R	F	2R	NH	2 / 21	42–18	70%
Miami	A	A	A	A	QF	3R	QF	3R	SF	SF	1R	F	W	W	SF	QF	2R	SF	1R	W	W	SF	SF	W	W	NH	6 / 21	63–15	81%
Monte Carlo	A	A	A	A	A	A	A	1R	QF	A	F	A	W	QF	F	QF	W	W	F	W	W	2R	A	W	A	NH	6 / 14	34–7	83%
Madrid (Note: Until 2001 held in Stuttgart (Hardcourt), 2002–2008 Hardcourt, 2009–present Clay)	A	A	A	A	A	A	2R	SF	1R	F	1R	W	W	QF	2R	W	W	2R	W	F	2R	QF	QF	F	1R	NH	5 / 19	34–14	71%
Rome	A	A	A	A	A	A	QF	1R	2R	SF	F	QF	F	W	F	W	QF	QF	W	SF	2R	W	SF	A	QF	A	4 / 18	36–14	72%
Canada	A	A	A	A	A	A	2R	W	SF	2R	SF	W	SF	F	SF	W	F	W	QF	2R	W	QF	QF	A	QF	NH	5 / 18	39–13	75%
Cincinnati	A	A	1R	Q1	1R	1R	QF	QF	W	2R	2R	F	F	W	F	W	SF	SF	W	W	QF	SF	QF	A	2R	A	5 / 21	40–16	71%
Shanghai	Not Held														QF	SF	QF	2R	SF	W	2R	SF	A	A	A	NH	1 / 8	12–7	63%
Paris	A	A	A	A	A	A	1R	2R	1R	1R	W	SF	W	2R	QF	SF	2R	2R	W	W	QF	QF	QF	A	A	A	4 / 17	22–13	63%
Hamburg	A	A	A	A	A	A	2R	1R	SF	F	QF	SF	W	F	NMS												1 / 8	16–7	70%
Win–loss	0–0	0–0	0–1	0–0	5–3	2–3	8–8	12–8	15–8	12–8	14–7	23–6	29–4	23–6	17–9	23–5	16–7	16–6	26–4	30–3	17–6	15–8	8–7	16–2	11–5	0–0	39 / 165	338–124	73%
Career statistics
	1995	1996	1997	1998	1999	2000	2001	2002	2003	2004	2005	2006	2007	2008	2009	2010	2011	2012	2013	2014	2015	2016	2017	2018	2019	2020	Career		
Tournaments	1	4	7	6	15	17	28	24	26	24	22	21	21	21	24	23	23	21	21	21	21	23	21	9	20	2	466		
Titles	0	0	0	0	0	0	4	5	5	7	5	7	11	5	7	11	8	7	11	10	6	3	2	2	2	1	119		
Finals	0	0	0	0	1	0	5	8	8	11	11	11	15	12	12	11	11	10	15	13	7	5	3	5	3	1	178		
Hard W–L	0–1	0–3	1–6	4–5	9–11	10–11	26–14	34–11	30–12	37–10	26–10	43–5	38–5	43–13	47–10	46–9	30–12	31–8	40–11	43–7	31–11	22–16	25–13	17–5	25–11	6–1	664–231		74%
Clay W–L	0–0	1–1	0–1	0–1	4–2	4–3	8–6	8–2	18–5	17–4	15–4	12–5	22–2	16–3	16–6	18–3	20–4	17–3	20–2	16–3	10–4	18–3	5–4	9–2	6–4	0–0	280–77		78%
Grass W–L	0–0	0–0	0–0	0–0	2–2	4–3	13–1	8–5	5–2	6–1	9–1	9–1	8–2	5–2	5–2	3–1	10–0	12–2	10–0	5–2	3–1	8–3	8–3	0–0	4–3	0–0	137–37		79%
Carpet W–L	0–0	0–0	0–0	0–0	0–0	0–0	0–3	4–1	0–2	4–2	8–3	2–3	9–0	0–0	Discontinued												27–14		66%
Overall W–L	0–1	1–4	1–7	4–6	15–15	18–17	47–24	54–19	53–21	64–17	58–18	66–14	77–9	64–18	68–18	67–13	60–16	60–13	70–13	64–12	44–16	48–22	38–20	26–7	35–18	6–1	1108–359		
Win %	0%	20%	13%	40%	50%	51%	66%	74%	72%	79%	76%	83%	90%	78%	79%	84%	79%	82%	84%	84%	73%	69%	66%	79%	66%	86%	75.53%		
Year-end rank	N/A	N/A	429	57	20	21	7	3	1	2	1	1	1	2	1	1	1	1	1	1	2	3	5	7 (Note: The team finished seventh in year-end rankings at the end of 2018 season, as Bob ended his season early due to a hip injury.)	9	32	$31,066,944		

== Parents ==
The Bryan brothers' mother, Kathy Bryan (née Blake), is a former women's circuit player. She is a four-time participant at Wimbledon and made the mixed doubles quarter-finals in 1965. She still teaches tennis. Their father, Wayne, is a lawyer, musician, and tennis instructor. Both their parents are involved in various ATP Kids' Days and clinics on tour. Wayne also wrote a book about his sons, titled The Formula: Raising Your Child to be a Champion.

== Personal life ==
The Bryan brothers are identical twins born on April 29, 1978, with Mike the elder by two minutes. Mike is 6 ft 3 in (1.91 m) and right-handed. Bob is 6 ft 4 in (1.93 m) and left-handed.

In their early days as junior players, they were forbidden to play each other in tournaments by their parents. If they were set to play each other in a tournament, they would alternate defaulting to the other. They graduated from Rio Mesa High School in Oxnard, California in 1996 and attended Stanford University (1996–98).

In 1998, Bob became the first player since Alex O'Brien in 1992 to win the college "Triple Crown" of NCAA singles, doubles (with Mike) and team titles. Both Bob and Mike are members of Sigma Alpha Epsilon.

The Bryans guest-starred on 8 Simple Rules and were on the Jan/Feb 2010 cover of Making Music Magazine.

== Grand Slam finals ==
=== As a team ===
==== Doubles: 30 (16 titles, 14 runner-ups) ====
Result	Year	Tournament	Surface	Opponents	Score
Win	2003	French Open	Clay	(Netherlands) Paul Haarhuis (Russia) Yevgeny Kafelnikov	7–6^{(7–3)}, 6–3
Loss	2003	US Open	Hard	(Sweden) Jonas Björkman (Australia) Todd Woodbridge	7–5, 0–6, 5–7
Loss	2004	Australian Open	Hard	(France) Michaël Llodra (France) Fabrice Santoro	6–7^{(4–7)}, 3–6
Loss	2005	Australian Open	Hard	(Zimbabwe) Wayne Black (Zimbabwe) Kevin Ullyett	4–6, 4–6
Loss	2005	French Open	Clay	(Sweden) Jonas Björkman (Belarus) Max Mirnyi	6–2, 1–6, 4–6
Loss	2005	Wimbledon	Grass	(Australia) Stephen Huss (South Africa) Wesley Moodie	6–7^{(4–7)}, 3–6, 7–6^{(7–2)}, 3–6
Win	2005	US Open	Hard	(Sweden) Jonas Björkman (Belarus) Max Mirnyi	6–1, 6–4
Win	2006	Australian Open	Hard	(Czech Republic) Martin Damm (India) Leander Paes	4–6, 6–3, 6–4
Loss	2006	French Open	Clay	(Sweden) Jonas Björkman (Belarus) Max Mirnyi	7–6^{(7–5)}, 4–6, 5–7
Win	2006	Wimbledon	Grass	(France) Fabrice Santoro (Serbia) Nenad Zimonjić	6–3, 4–6, 6–4, 6–2
Win	2007	Australian Open (2)	Hard	(Sweden) Jonas Björkman (Belarus) Max Mirnyi	7–5, 7–5
Loss	2007	Wimbledon	Grass	(France) Arnaud Clément (France) Michaël Llodra	7–6^{(7–5)}, 3–6, 4–6, 4–6
Win	2008	US Open (2)	Hard	(Czech Republic) Lukáš Dlouhý (India) Leander Paes	7–6^{(7–5)}, 7–6^{(12–10)}
Win	2009	Australian Open (3)	Hard	(India) Mahesh Bhupathi (The Bahamas) Mark Knowles	2–6, 7–5, 6–0
Loss	2009	Wimbledon	Grass	(Canada) Daniel Nestor (Serbia) Nenad Zimonjić	6–7^{(7–9)}, 7–6^{(7–3)}, 6–7^{(3–7)}, 3–6
Win	2010	Australian Open (4)	Hard	(Canada) Daniel Nestor (Serbia) Nenad Zimonjić	6–3, 6–7^{(5–7)}, 6–3
Win	2010	US Open (3)	Hard	(India) Rohan Bopanna (Pakistan) Aisam-ul-Haq Qureshi	7–6^{(7–5)}, 7–6^{(7–4)}
Win	2011	Australian Open (5)	Hard	(India) Mahesh Bhupathi (India) Leander Paes	6–3, 6–4
Win	2011	Wimbledon (2)	Grass	(Sweden) Robert Lindstedt (Romania) Horia Tecău	6–3, 6–4, 7–6^{(7–2)}
Loss	2012	Australian Open	Hard	(India) Leander Paes (Czech Republic) Radek Štěpánek	6–7^{(1–7)}, 2–6
Loss	2012	French Open	Clay	(Belarus) Max Mirnyi (Canada) Daniel Nestor	4–6, 4–6
Win	2012	US Open (4)	Hard	(India) Leander Paes (Czech Republic) Radek Štepánek	6–3, 6–4
Win	2013	Australian Open (6)	Hard	(Netherlands) Robin Haase (Netherlands) Igor Sijsling	6–3, 6–4
Win	2013	French Open (2)	Clay	(France) Michaël Llodra (France) Nicolas Mahut	6–4, 4–6, 7–6^{(7–4)}
Win	2013	Wimbledon (3)	Grass	(Croatia) Ivan Dodig (Brazil) Marcelo Melo	3–6, 6–3, 6–4, 6–4
Loss	2014	Wimbledon	Grass	(Canada) Vasek Pospisil (United States) Jack Sock	6–7^{(5–7)}, 7–6^{(7–3)}, 4–6, 6–3, 5–7
Win	2014	US Open (5)	Hard	(Spain) Marcel Granollers (Spain) Marc López	6–3, 6–4
Loss	2015	French Open	Clay	(Croatia) Ivan Dodig (Brazil) Marcelo Melo	7–6^{(7–5)}, 6–7^{(5–7)}, 5–7
Loss	2016	French Open	Clay	(Spain) Feliciano López (Spain) Marc López	4–6, 7–6^{(8–6)}, 3–6
Loss	2017	Australian Open	Hard	(Finland) Henri Kontinen (Australia) John Peers	5–7, 5–7

=== Bob individually ===
==== Mixed doubles: 9 (7 titles, 2 runner-ups) ====
Result	Year	Tournament	Surface	Partner	Opponents	Score
Loss	2002	US Open	Hard	(Slovenia) Katarina Srebotnik	(United States) Lisa Raymond (United States) Mike Bryan	6–7^{(9–11)}, 6–7^{(1–7)}
Win	2003	US Open	Hard	(Slovenia) Katarina Srebotnik	(Russia) Lina Krasnoroutskaya (Canada) Daniel Nestor	5–7, 7–5, [10–5]
Win	2004	US Open (2)	Hard	(Russia) Vera Zvonareva	(Australia) Alicia Molik (Australia) Todd Woodbridge	6–3, 6–4
Loss	2006	Wimbledon	Grass	(United States) Venus Williams	(Russia) Vera Zvonareva (Israel) Andy Ram	3–6, 2–6
Win	2006	US Open (3)	Hard	(United States) Martina Navratilova	(Czech Republic) Květa Peschke (Czech Republic) Martin Damm	6–2, 6–3
Win	2008	French Open	Clay	(Belarus) Victoria Azarenka	(Slovenia) Katarina Srebotnik (Serbia) Nenad Zimonjić	6–2, 7–6^{(7–4)}
Win	2008	Wimbledon	Grass	(Australia) Samantha Stosur	(Slovenia) Katarina Srebotnik (United States) Mike Bryan	7–5, 6–4
Win	2009	French Open (2)	Clay	(United States) Liezel Huber	(United States) Vania King (Brazil) Marcelo Melo	5–7, 7–6^{(7–5)}, [10–7]
Win	2010	US Open (4)	Hard	(United States) Liezel Huber	(Czech Republic) Květa Peschke (Pakistan) Aisam-ul-Haq Qureshi	6–4, 6–4

=== Mike individually ===
==== Men's doubles: 2 (2 titles) ====
Result	Year	Tournament	Surface	Partner	Opponents	Score
Win	2018	Wimbledon	Grass	(United States) Jack Sock	(South Africa) Raven Klaasen (New Zealand) Michael Venus	6–3, 6–7^{(7–9)}, 6–3, 5–7, 7–5
Win	2018	US Open	Hard	(United States) Jack Sock	(Poland) Łukasz Kubot (Brazil) Marcelo Melo	6–3, 6–1

==== Mixed doubles: 6 (4 titles, 2 runner-ups) ====
Result	Year	Tournament	Surface	Partner	Opponents	Score
Loss	2001	Wimbledon	Grass	(South Africa) Liezel Huber	(Slovakia) Daniela Hantuchová (Czech Republic) Leoš Friedl	6–4, 3–6, 2–6
Win	2002	US Open	Hard	(United States) Lisa Raymond	(Slovenia) Katarina Srebotnik (United States) Bob Bryan	7–6^{(11–9)}, 7–6^{(7–1)}
Win	2003	French Open	Clay	(United States) Lisa Raymond	(Russia) Elena Likhovtseva (India) Mahesh Bhupathi	6–3, 6–4
Loss	2008	Wimbledon	Grass	(Slovenia) Katarina Srebotnik	(Australia) Samantha Stosur (United States) Bob Bryan	5–7, 4–6
Win	2012	Wimbledon	Grass	(United States) Lisa Raymond	(Russia) Elena Vesnina (India) Leander Paes	6–3, 5–7, 6–4
Win	2015	French Open	Clay	(United States) Bethanie Mattek-Sands	(Czech Republic) Lucie Hradecká (Poland) Marcin Matkowski	7–6^{(7–3)}, 6–1

== Other significant finals ==
=== Year–end championships ===
==== Doubles: 6 (4 titles, 2 runner-ups) ====
Result	Year	Tournament	Surface	Opponents	Score
Win	2003	Tennis Masters Cup, Houston	Hard	(France) Michaël Llodra (France) Fabrice Santoro	6–7^{(6–8)}, 6–3, 3–6, 7–6^{(7–3)}, 6–4
Win	2004	Tennis Masters Cup, Houston (2)	Hard	(Zimbabwe) Wayne Black (Zimbabwe) Kevin Ullyett	4–6, 7–5, 6–4, 6–2
Loss	2008	Tennis Masters Cup, Shanghai	Hard (i)	(Canada) Daniel Nestor (Serbia) Nenad Zimonjić	6–7^{(3–7)}, 2–6
Win	2009	ATP World Tour Finals, London (3)	Hard (i)	(Belarus) Max Mirnyi (Israel) Andy Ram	7–6^{(7–5)}, 6–3
Loss	2013	ATP World Tour Finals, London	Hard (i)	(Spain) David Marrero (Spain) Fernando Verdasco	5–7, 7–6^{(7–3)}, [7–10]
Win	2014	ATP World Tour Finals, London (4)	Hard (i)	(Croatia) Ivan Dodig (Brazil) Marcelo Melo	6–7^{(5–7)}, 6–2, [10–7]

=== Mike individually ===
==== Doubles: 1 (1 title) ====
Result	Year	Tournament	Surface	Partner	Opponents	Score
Win	2018	ATP Finals, London	Hard (i)	(United States) Jack Sock	(France) Pierre-Hugues Herbert (France) Nicolas Mahut	5–7, 6–1, [13–11]

=== ATP Masters 1000 finals ===
==== Doubles: 59 (39 titles, 20 runner-ups) ====
Result	Year	Tournament	Surface	Opponents	Score
Win	2002	Canadian Open	Hard	(The Bahamas) Mark Knowles (Canada) Daniel Nestor	4–6, 7–6^{(7–1)}, 6–3
Loss	2003	Indian Wells Masters	Hard	(South Africa) Wayne Ferreira (Russia) Yevgeny Kafelnikov	6–3, 5–7, 4–6
Win	2003	Cincinnati Masters	Hard	(Australia) Wayne Arthurs (Australia) Paul Hanley	7–5, 7–6^{(7–5)}
Loss	2004	Hamburg Masters	Clay	(Zimbabwe) Wayne Black (Zimbabwe) Kevin Ullyett	4–6, 2–6
Loss	2004	Madrid Open	Hard (i)	(The Bahamas) Mark Knowles (Canada) Daniel Nestor	3–6, 4–6
Loss	2005	Monte-Carlo Masters	Clay	(India) Leander Paes (Serbia and Montenegro) Nenad Zimonjić	Walkover
Loss	2005	Italian Open	Clay	(France) Michaël Llodra (France) Fabrice Santoro	4–6, 2–6
Win	2005	Paris Masters	Carpet (i)	(The Bahamas) Mark Knowles (Canada) Daniel Nestor	6–4, 6–7^{(3–7)}, 6–4
Loss	2006	Indian Wells Masters	Hard	(The Bahamas) Mark Knowles (Canada) Daniel Nestor	4–6, 4–6
Loss	2006	Miami Open	Hard	(Sweden) Jonas Björkman (Belarus) Max Mirnyi	4–6, 4–6
Win	2006	Canadian Open (2)	Hard	(Australia) Paul Hanley (Zimbabwe) Kevin Ullyett	6–3, 7–5
Loss	2006	Cincinnati Masters	Hard	(Sweden) Jonas Björkman (Belarus) Max Mirnyi	6–3, 3–6, [7–10]
Win	2006	Madrid Open	Hard (i)	(The Bahamas) Mark Knowles (Canada) Daniel Nestor	7–5, 6–4
Win	2007	Miami Open	Hard	(Czech Republic) Martin Damm (India) Leander Paes	6–7^{(7–9)}, 6–3, [10–7]
Win	2007	Monte-Carlo Masters	Clay	(France) Julien Benneteau (France) Richard Gasquet	6–2, 6–1
Loss	2007	Italian Open	Clay	(France) Fabrice Santoro (Serbia) Nenad Zimonjić	4–6, 7–6^{(7–4)}, [7–10]
Win	2007	Hamburg Masters	Clay	(Australia) Paul Hanley (Zimbabwe) Kevin Ullyett	6–3, 6–4
Loss	2007	Cincinnati Masters	Hard	(Israel) Jonathan Erlich (Israel) Andy Ram	6–4, 3–6, [11–13]
Win	2007	Madrid Open (2)	Hard (i)	(Poland) Mariusz Fyrstenberg (Poland) Marcin Matkowski	6–3, 7–6^{(7–4)}
Win	2007	Paris Masters (2)	Hard (i)	(Canada) Daniel Nestor (Serbia) Nenad Zimonjić	6–3, 7–6^{(7–4)}
Win	2008	Miami Open (2)	Hard	(India) Mahesh Bhupathi (The Bahamas) Mark Knowles	6–2, 6–2
Win	2008	Italian Open	Clay	(Canada) Daniel Nestor (Serbia) Nenad Zimonjić	3–6, 6–4, [10–8]
Loss	2008	Hamburg Masters	Clay	(Canada) Daniel Nestor (Serbia) Nenad Zimonjić	4–6, 7–5, [8–10]
Loss	2008	Canadian Open	Hard	(Canada) Daniel Nestor (Serbia) Nenad Zimonjić	2–6, 6–4, [6–10]
Win	2008	Cincinnati Masters (2)	Hard	(Israel) Jonathan Erlich (Israel) Andy Ram	4–6, 7–6^{(7–2)}, [10–7]
Loss	2009	Monte-Carlo Masters	Clay	(Canada) Daniel Nestor (Serbia) Nenad Zimonjić	4–6, 1–6
Loss	2009	Italian Open	Clay	(Canada) Daniel Nestor (Serbia) Nenad Zimonjić	6–7^{(5–7)}, 3–6
Loss	2009	Cincinnati Masters	Hard	(Canada) Daniel Nestor (Serbia) Nenad Zimonjić	6–3, 6–7^{(2–7)}, [13–15]
Win	2010	Italian Open (2)	Clay	(United States) John Isner (United States) Sam Querrey	6–2, 6–3
Win	2010	Madrid Open (3)	Clay	(Canada) Daniel Nestor (Serbia) Nenad Zimonjić	6–3, 6–4
Win	2010	Canadian Open (3)	Hard	(France) Julien Benneteau (France) Michaël Llodra	7–5, 6–3
Win	2010	Cincinnati Masters (3)	Hard	(India) Mahesh Bhupathi (Belarus) Max Mirnyi	6–3, 6–4
Win	2011	Monte-Carlo Masters (2)	Clay	(Argentina) Juan Ignacio Chela (Brazil) Bruno Soares	6–3, 6–2
Win	2011	Madrid Open (4)	Clay	(France) Michaël Llodra (Serbia) Nenad Zimonjić	6–3, 6–3
Loss	2011	Canadian Open	Hard	(France) Michaël Llodra (Serbia) Nenad Zimonjić	4–6, 7–6^{(7–5)}, [5–10]
Win	2012	Monte-Carlo Masters (3)	Clay	(Belarus) Max Mirnyi (Canada) Daniel Nestor	6–2, 6–3
Win	2012	Canadian Open (4)	Hard	(Spain) Marcel Granollers (Spain) Marc López	6–1, 4–6, [12–10]
Win	2013	Indian Wells Masters	Hard	(Philippines) Treat Huey (Poland) Jerzy Janowicz	6–3, 3–6, [10–6]
Loss	2013	Monte-Carlo Masters	Clay	(France) Julien Benneteau (Serbia) Nenad Zimonjić	6–4, 6–7^{(4–7)}, [12–14]
Win	2013	Madrid Open (5)	Clay	(Austria) Alexander Peya (Brazil) Bruno Soares	6–2, 6–3
Win	2013	Italian Open (3)	Clay	(India) Mahesh Bhupathi (India) Rohan Bopanna	6–2, 6–3
Win	2013	Cincinnati Masters (4)	Hard	(Spain) Marcel Granollers (Spain) Marc López	6–4, 4–6, [10–4]
Win	2013	Paris Masters (3)	Hard (i)	(Austria) Alexander Peya (Brazil) Bruno Soares	6–3, 6–3
Win	2014	Indian Wells Masters (2)	Hard	(Austria) Alexander Peya (Brazil) Bruno Soares	6–4, 6–3
Win	2014	Miami Open (3)	Hard	(Colombia) Juan Sebastián Cabal (Colombia) Robert Farah	7–6^{(10–8)}, 6–4
Win	2014	Monte-Carlo Masters (4)	Clay	(Croatia) Ivan Dodig (Brazil) Marcelo Melo	6–3, 3–6, [10–8]
Loss	2014	Madrid Open	Clay	(Canada) Daniel Nestor (Serbia) Nenad Zimonjić	4–6, 2–6
Win	2014	Cincinnati Masters (5)	Hard	(Canada) Vasek Pospisil (United States) Jack Sock	6–3, 6–2
Win	2014	Shanghai Masters	Hard	(France) Julien Benneteau (France) Édouard Roger-Vasselin	6–3, 7–6^{(7–3)}
Win	2014	Paris Masters (4)	Hard (i)	(Poland) Marcin Matkowski (Austria) Jürgen Melzer	7–6^{(7–5)}, 5–7, [10–6]
Win	2015	Miami Open (4)	Hard	(Canada) Vasek Pospisil (United States) Jack Sock	6–3, 1–6, [10–8]
Win	2015	Monte-Carlo Masters (5)	Clay	(Italy) Simone Bolelli (Italy) Fabio Fognini	7–6^{(7–3)}, 6–1
Win	2015	Canadian Open (5)	Hard	(Canada) Daniel Nestor (France) Édouard Roger-Vasselin	7–6^{(7–5)}, 3–6, [10–6]
Win	2016	Italian Open (4)	Clay	(Canada) Vasek Pospisil (United States) Jack Sock	2–6, 6–3, [10–7]
Loss	2018	Indian Wells Masters	Hard	(United States) John Isner (United States) Jack Sock	6–7^{(4–7)}, 6–7^{(2–7)}
Win	2018	Miami Open (5)	Hard	(Russia) Karen Khachanov (Russia) Andrey Rublev	4-6, 7-6^{(5)}, [10–4]
Win	2018	Monte-Carlo Masters (6)	Clay	(Austria) Oliver Marach (Croatia) Mate Pavić	7–6^{(7–5)}, 6–3
Loss	2018	Madrid Open	Clay	(Croatia) Nikola Mektić (Austria) Alexander Peya	3–5, ret.
Win	2019	Miami Open (6)	Hard	(Netherlands) Wesley Koolhof (Greece) Stefanos Tsitsipas	7–5, 7–6^{(10–8)}

=== Olympic and Pan Am Games medals as a team ===
==== Doubles: 3 (1 gold medal, 2 bronze medals) ====
Result	Year	Tournament	Surface	Opponents	Score
Bronze	1999	Pan Am Games (Winnipeg)	Hard	No Bronze Medal Match	
Bronze	2008	Summer Olympics (Beijing)	Hard	(France) Arnaud Clément (France) Michaël Llodra	3–6, 6–3, 6–4
Gold	2012	Summer Olympics (London)	Grass	(France) Michaël Llodra (France) Jo-Wilfried Tsonga	6–4, 7–6^{(7–2)}

=== Mike individually ===
==== Mixed doubles: 1 (1 bronze medal) ====
Result	Year	Tournament	Surface	Partner	Opponents	Score
Bronze	2012	Summer Olympics (London)	Grass	(United States) Lisa Raymond	(Germany) Sabine Lisicki (Germany) Christopher Kas	6–3, 4–6, [10–4]

=== Team competition finals ===
==== Team: 3 (1 title, 2 runner-ups) ====
Result	Year	Tournament	Surface	Partners	Opponents	Score
Loss	2004	Davis Cup, Spain	Clay (i)	(United States) Andy Roddick (United States) Mardy Fish	(Spain) Juan Carlos Ferrero (Spain) Carlos Moyá (Spain) Rafael Nadal (Spain) Tommy Robredo	2–3
Win	2007	Davis Cup, US	Hard (i)	(United States) Andy Roddick (United States) James Blake	(Russia) Nikolay Davydenko (Russia) Mikhail Youzhny (Russia) Igor Andreev (Russia) Dmitry Tursunov	4–1
Loss	2010	World Team Cup, Germany	Clay	(United States) Sam Querrey (United States) Robby Ginepri	(Argentina) Juan Mónaco (Argentina) Horacio Zeballos (Argentina) Eduardo Schwank (Argentina) Diego Veronelli	1–2

== ATP career finals ==
=== As a team ===
==== Doubles: 178 (119 titles, 59 runner-ups) ====
Legend (pre/post 2009) Grand Slam tournaments (16–14) Tennis Masters Cup / ATP World Tour Finals (4–2) ATP Masters Series / ATP World Tour Masters 1000 (39–20) Olympic Games (1–0) ATP International Series Gold / ATP World Tour 500 Series (14–10) ATP International Series / ATP World Tour 250 Series (45–13)	Finals by surface Hard (75–35) Clay (28–18) Grass (13–6) Carpet (3–0)	Finals by setting Outdoor (102–49) Indoor (17–10)

Result	W–L	Date	Tournament	Tier	Surface	Opponents	Score
Loss	0–1	Apr 1999	U.S. Men's Clay Court Championships, US	World Series	Clay	(United States) Jim Courier (Australia) Todd Woodbridge	6–7^{(4–7)}, 4–6
Win	1–1	Feb 2001	U.S. National Indoor Tennis Championships, US	Intl. Gold	Hard (i)	(United States) Alex O'Brien (United States) Jonathan Stark	6–3, 7–6^{(7–3)}
Win	2–1	Jun 2001	Queen's Club Championships, UK	International	Grass	(United States) Eric Taino (United States) David Wheaton	6–3, 3–6, 6–1
Win	3–1	Jul 2001	Hall of Fame Tennis Championships, US	International	Grass	(Brazil) André Sá (United States) Glenn Weiner	6–3, 7–5
Win	4–1	Jul 2001	Los Angeles Open, US	International	Hard	(United States) Jan-Michael Gambill (United States) Andy Roddick	7–5, 7–6^{(8–6)}
Loss	4–2	Aug 2001	Washington Open, US	Intl. Gold	Hard	(Czech Republic) Martin Damm (Germany) David Prinosil	6–7^{(5–7)}, 3–6
Loss	4–3	Jan 2002	Adelaide International, Australia	International	Hard	(Zimbabwe) Wayne Black (Zimbabwe) Kevin Ullyett	5–7, 2–6
Loss	4–4	Feb 2002	U.S. National Indoor Tennis Championships, US	Intl. Gold	Hard (i)	(United States) Brian MacPhie (Federal Republic of Yugoslavia) Nenad Zimonjić	3–6, 6–3, [4–10]
Win	5–4	Mar 2002	Mexican Open, Mexico	Intl. Gold	Clay	(Czech Republic) Martin Damm (Czech Republic) David Rikl	6–1, 3–6, [10–2]
Win	6–4	Mar 2002	Scottsdale Open, US	International	Hard	(The Bahamas) Mark Knowles (Canada) Daniel Nestor	7–5, 7–6^{(8–6)}
Win	7–4	Jul 2002	Hall of Fame Tennis Championships, US (2)	International	Grass	(Austria) Jürgen Melzer (Germany) Alexander Popp	7–5, 6–3
Win	8–4	Aug 2002	Canadian Open, Canada	Masters	Hard	(The Bahamas) Mark Knowles (Canada) Daniel Nestor	4–6, 7–6^{(7–1)}, 6–3
Loss	8–5	Aug 2002	Washington Open, US	Intl. Gold	Hard	(Zimbabwe) Wayne Black (Zimbabwe) Kevin Ullyett	6–3, 3–6, 5–7
Win	9–5	Oct 2002	Swiss Indoors, Switzerland	International	Carpet (i)	(The Bahamas) Mark Knowles (Canada) Daniel Nestor	7–6^{(7–1)}, 7–5
Loss	9–6	Feb 2003	U.S. National Indoor Tennis Championships, US	Intl. Gold	Hard (i)	(The Bahamas) Mark Knowles (Canada) Daniel Nestor	2–6, 6–7^{(3–7)}
Loss	9–7	Mar 2003	Indian Wells Masters, US	Masters	Hard	(South Africa) Wayne Ferreira (Russia) Yevgeny Kafelnikov	6–3, 5–7, 4–6
Win	10–7	Apr 2003	Barcelona Open, Spain	Intl. Gold	Clay	(South Africa) Chris Haggard (South Africa) Robbie Koenig	6–4, 6–3
Win	11–7	Jun 2003	French Open, France	Grand Slam	Clay	(Netherlands) Paul Haarhuis (Russia) Yevgeny Kafelnikov	7–6^{(7–3)}, 6–3
Win	12–7	Jun 2003	Nottingham Open, UK	International	Grass	(Australia) Joshua Eagle (United States) Jared Palmer	7–6^{(7–3)}, 4–6, 7–6^{(7–4)}
Win	13–7	Aug 2003	Cincinnati Masters, US	Masters	Hard	(Australia) Wayne Arthurs (Australia) Paul Hanley	7–5, 7–6^{(7–5)}
Loss	13–8	Sep 2003	US Open, US	Grand Slam	Hard	(Sweden) Jonas Björkman (Australia) Todd Woodbridge	7–5, 0–6, 5–7
Win	14–8	Nov 2003	Tennis Masters Cup, US	Tour Finals	Hard	(France) Michaël Llodra (France) Fabrice Santoro	6–7^{(6–8)}, 6–3, 3–6, 7–6^{(7–3)}, 6–4
Win	15–8	Jan 2004	Adelaide International, Australia	International	Hard	(France) Arnaud Clément (France) Michaël Llodra	7–5, 6–3
Loss	15–9	Jan 2004	Sydney International, Australia	International	Hard	(Sweden) Jonas Björkman (Australia) Todd Woodbridge	6–7^{(3–7)}, 5–7
Loss	15–10	Jan 2004	Australian Open, Australia	Grand Slam	Hard	(France) Michaël Llodra (France) Fabrice Santoro	6–7^{(4–7)}, 3–6
Win	16–10	Feb 2004	U.S. National Indoor Tennis Championships, US (2)	Intl. Gold	Hard (i)	(South Africa) Jeff Coetzee (South Africa) Chris Haggard	6–3, 6–4
Win	17–10	Mar 2004	Mexican Open, Mexico (2)	Intl. Gold	Clay	(Argentina) Juan Ignacio Chela (Chile) Nicolás Massú	6–2, 6–3
Loss	17–11	May 2004	Hamburg Masters, Germany	Masters	Clay	(Zimbabwe) Wayne Black (Zimbabwe) Kevin Ullyett	4–6, 2–6
Win	18–11	Jun 2004	Queen's Club Championships, UK (2)	International	Grass	(The Bahamas) Mark Knowles (Canada) Daniel Nestor	6–4, 6–4
Win	19–11	Jul 2004	Los Angeles Open, US (2)	International	Hard	(Australia) Wayne Arthurs (Australia) Paul Hanley	6–3, 7–6^{(8–6)}
Loss	19–12	Oct 2004	Madrid Open, Spain	Masters	Hard (i)	(The Bahamas) Mark Knowles (Canada) Daniel Nestor	3–6, 4–6
Win	20–12	Nov 2004	Swiss Indoors, Switzerland (2)	International	Carpet (i)	(Argentina) Lucas Arnold Ker (Argentina) Mariano Hood	7–6^{(11–9)}, 6–2
Win	21–12	Nov 2004	Tennis Masters Cup, US (2)	Tour Finals	Hard	(Zimbabwe) Wayne Black (Zimbabwe) Kevin Ullyett	4–6, 7–5, 6–4, 6–2
Loss	21–13	Jan 2005	Australian Open, Australia	Grand Slam	Hard	(Zimbabwe) Wayne Black (Zimbabwe) Kevin Ullyett	4–6, 4–6
Loss	21–14	Feb 2005	U.S. National Indoor Tennis Championships, US	Intl. Gold	Hard (i)	(Sweden) Simon Aspelin (Australia) Todd Perry	4–6, 4–6
Win	22–14	Feb 2005	Scottsdale Open, US (2)	International	Hard	(Australia) Wayne Arthurs (Australia) Paul Hanley	7–5, 6–4
Loss	22–15	Apr 2005	Monte-Carlo Masters, Monaco	Masters	Clay	(India) Leander Paes (Serbia and Montenegro) Nenad Zimonjić	Walkover
Loss	22–16	May 2005	Italian Open, Italy	Masters	Clay	(France) Michaël Llodra (France) Fabrice Santoro	4–6, 2–6
Loss	22–17	Jun 2005	French Open, France	Grand Slam	Clay	(Sweden) Jonas Björkman (Belarus) Max Mirnyi	6–2, 1–6, 4–6
Win	23–17	Jun 2005	Queen's Club Championships, UK (3)	International	Grass	(Sweden) Jonas Björkman (Belarus) Max Mirnyi	7–6^{(11–9)}, 7–6^{(7–4)}
Loss	23–18	Jul 2005	Wimbledon Championships, UK	Grand Slam	Grass	(Australia) Stephen Huss (South Africa) Wesley Moodie	6–7^{(4–7)}, 3–6, 7–6^{(7–2)}, 3–6
Win	24–18	Aug 2005	Washington Open, US	International	Hard	(Zimbabwe) Wayne Black (Zimbabwe) Kevin Ullyett	6–4, 6–2
Win	25–18	Sep 2005	US Open, US	Grand Slam	Hard	(Sweden) Jonas Björkman (Belarus) Max Mirnyi	6–1, 6–4
Win	26–18	Nov 2005	Paris Masters, France	Masters	Carpet (i)	(The Bahamas) Mark Knowles (Canada) Daniel Nestor	6–4, 6–7^{(3–7)}, 6–4
Win	27–18	Jan 2006	Australian Open, Australia	Grand Slam	Hard	(Czech Republic) Martin Damm (India) Leander Paes	4–6, 6–3, 6–4
Win	28–18	Mar 2006	Las Vegas Open, US (3)	International	Hard	(Czech Republic) Jaroslav Levinský (Sweden) Robert Lindstedt	6–3, 6–2
Loss	28–19	Mar 2006	Indian Wells Masters, US	Masters	Hard	(The Bahamas) Mark Knowles (Canada) Daniel Nestor	4–6, 4–6
Loss	28–20	Apr 2006	Miami Open, US	Masters	Hard	(Sweden) Jonas Björkman (Belarus) Max Mirnyi	4–6, 4–6
Loss	28–21	Jun 2006	French Open, France	Grand Slam	Clay	(Sweden) Jonas Björkman (Belarus) Max Mirnyi	7–6^{(7–5)}, 4–6, 5–7
Win	29–21	Jul 2006	Wimbledon Championships, UK	Grand Slam	Grass	(France) Fabrice Santoro (Serbia) Nenad Zimonjić	6–3, 4–6, 6–4, 6–2
Win	30–21	Jul 2006	Los Angeles Open, US (3)	International	Hard	(United States) Eric Butorac (United Kingdom) Jamie Murray	6–2, 6–4
Win	31–21	Aug 2006	Washington Open, US (2)	International	Hard	(Australia) Paul Hanley (Zimbabwe) Kevin Ullyett	6–3, 5–7, [10–3]
Win	32–21	Aug 2006	Canadian Open, Canada (2)	Masters	Hard	(Australia) Paul Hanley (Zimbabwe) Kevin Ullyett	6–3, 7–5
Loss	32–22	Aug 2006	Cincinnati Masters, US	Masters	Hard	(Sweden) Jonas Björkman (Belarus) Max Mirnyi	6–3, 3–6, [7–10]
Win	33–22	Oct 2006	Madrid Open, Spain	Masters	Hard (i)	(The Bahamas) Mark Knowles (Canada) Daniel Nestor	7–5, 6–4
Win	34–22	Jan 2007	Australian Open, Australia (2)	Grand Slam	Hard	(Sweden) Jonas Björkman (Belarus) Max Mirnyi	7–5, 7–5
Win	35–22	Mar 2007	Las Vegas Open, US (4)	International	Hard	(Israel) Jonathan Erlich (Israel) Andy Ram	7–6^{(8–6)}, 6–2
Win	36–22	Apr 2007	Miami Open, US	Masters	Hard	(Czech Republic) Martin Damm (India) Leander Paes	6–7^{(7–9)}, 6–3, [10–7]
Win	37–22	Apr 2007	U.S. Men's Clay Court Championships, US	International	Clay	(The Bahamas) Mark Knowles (Canada) Daniel Nestor	7–6^{(7–3)}, 6–4
Win	38–22	Apr 2007	Monte-Carlo Masters, Monaco	Masters	Clay	(France) Julien Benneteau (France) Richard Gasquet	6–2, 6–1
Loss	38–23	May 2007	Italian Open, Italy	Masters	Clay	(France) Fabrice Santoro (Serbia) Nenad Zimonjić	4–6, 7–6^{(7–4)}, [7–10]
Win	39–23	May 2007	Hamburg Masters, Germany	Masters	Clay	(Australia) Paul Hanley (Zimbabwe) Kevin Ullyett	6–3, 6–4
Loss	39–24	Jun 2007	Queen's Club Championships, UK	International	Grass	(The Bahamas) Mark Knowles (Canada) Daniel Nestor	6–7^{(4–7)}, 5–7
Loss	39–25	Jul 2007	Wimbledon Championships, UK	Grand Slam	Grass	(France) Arnaud Clément (France) Michaël Llodra	7–6^{(7–5)}, 3–6, 4–6, 4–6
Win	40–25	Jul 2007	Los Angeles Open, US (4)	International	Hard	(United States) Scott Lipsky (United States) David Martin	7–6^{(7–5)}, 6–2
Win	41–25	Aug 2007	Washington Open, US (3)	International	Hard	(Israel) Jonathan Erlich (Israel) Andy Ram	7–6^{(7–5)}, 3–6, [10–7]
Loss	41–26	Aug 2007	Cincinnati Masters, US	Masters	Hard	(Israel) Jonathan Erlich (Israel) Andy Ram	6–4, 3–6, [11–13]
Win	42–26	Oct 2007	Madrid Open, Spain (2)	Masters	Hard (i)	(Poland) Mariusz Fyrstenberg (Poland) Marcin Matkowski	6–3, 7–6^{(7–4)}
Win	43–26	Oct 2007	Swiss Indoors, Switzerland (3)	International	Hard (i)	(United States) James Blake (The Bahamas) Mark Knowles	6–1, 6–1
Win	44–26	Nov 2007	Paris Masters, France (2)	Masters	Hard (i)	(Canada) Daniel Nestor (Serbia) Nenad Zimonjić	6–3, 7–6^{(7–4)}
Loss	44–27	Jan 2008	Sydney International, Australia	International	Hard	(France) Richard Gasquet (France) Jo-Wilfried Tsonga	6–4, 4–6, [9–11]
Loss	44–28	Feb 2008	Delray Beach Open, US	International	Hard	(Belarus) Max Mirnyi (United Kingdom) Jamie Murray	4–6, 6–3, [6–10]
Loss	44–29	Feb 2008	Pacific Coast Championships, US	International	Hard (i)	(United States) Scott Lipsky (United States) David Martin	6–7^{(4–7)}, 5–7
Loss	44–30	Mar 2008	Las Vegas Open, US	International	Hard	(France) Julien Benneteau (France) Michaël Llodra	4–6, 6–4, [8–10]
Win	45–30	Apr 2008	Miami Open, US (2)	Masters	Hard	(India) Mahesh Bhupathi (The Bahamas) Mark Knowles	6–2, 6–2
Win	46–30	May 2008	Barcelona Open, Spain (2)	Intl. Gold	Clay	(Poland) Mariusz Fyrstenberg (Poland) Marcin Matkowski	6–3, 6–2
Win	47–30	May 2008	Italian Open, Italy	Masters	Clay	(Canada) Daniel Nestor (Serbia) Nenad Zimonjić	3–6, 6–4, [10–8]
Loss	47–31	May 2008	Hamburg Masters, Germany	Masters	Clay	(Canada) Daniel Nestor (Serbia) Nenad Zimonjić	4–6, 7–5, [8–10]
Loss	47–32	Jul 2008	Canadian Open, Canada	Masters	Hard	(Canada) Daniel Nestor (Serbia) Nenad Zimonjić	2–6, 6–4, [6–10]
Win	48–32	Aug 2008	Cincinnati Masters, US (2)	Masters	Hard	(Israel) Jonathan Erlich (Israel) Andy Ram	4–6, 7–6^{(7–2)}, [10–7]
Win	49–32	Sep 2008	US Open, US (2)	Grand Slam	Hard	(Czech Republic) Lukáš Dlouhý (India) Leander Paes	7–6^{(7–5)}, 7–6^{(12–10)}
Loss	49–33	Nov 2008	Tennis Masters Cup, China	Tour Finals	Hard (i)	(Canada) Daniel Nestor (Serbia) Nenad Zimonjić	6–7^{(3–7)}, 2–6
Win	50–33	Jan 2009	Sydney International, Australia	250 Series	Hard	(Canada) Daniel Nestor (Serbia) Nenad Zimonjić	6–1, 7–6^{(7–3)}
Win	51–33	Jan 2009	Australian Open, Australia (3)	Grand Slam	Hard	(India) Mahesh Bhupathi (The Bahamas) Mark Knowles	2–6, 7–5, 6–0
Win	52–33	Mar 2009	Delray Beach Open, US	250 Series	Hard	(Brazil) Marcelo Melo (Brazil) André Sá	6–4, 6–4
Win	53–33	Apr 2009	U.S. Men's Clay Court Championships, US (2)	250 Series	Clay	(United States) Jesse Levine (United States) Ryan Sweeting	6–1, 6–2
Loss	53–34	Apr 2009	Monte-Carlo Masters, Monaco	Masters 1000	Clay	(Canada) Daniel Nestor (Serbia) Nenad Zimonjić	4–6, 1–6
Loss	53–35	May 2009	Italian Open, Italy	Masters 1000	Clay	(Canada) Daniel Nestor (Serbia) Nenad Zimonjić	6–7^{(5–7)}, 3–6
Loss	53–36	Jul 2009	Wimbledon Championships, UK	Grand Slam	Grass	(Canada) Daniel Nestor (Serbia) Nenad Zimonjić	6–7^{(7–9)}, 7–6^{(7–3)}, 6–7^{(3–7)}, 3–6
Win	54–36	Aug 2009	Los Angeles Open, US (5)	250 Series	Hard	(Germany) Benjamin Becker (Germany) Frank Moser	6–4, 7–6^{(7–2)}
Loss	54–37	Aug 2009	Cincinnati Masters, US	Masters 1000	Hard	(Canada) Daniel Nestor (Serbia) Nenad Zimonjić	6–3, 6–7^{(2–7)}, [13–15]
Win	55–37	Oct 2009	China Open, China	500 Series	Hard	(The Bahamas) Mark Knowles (United States) Andy Roddick	6–4, 6–2
Loss	55–38	Nov 2009	Swiss Indoors, Switzerland	500 Series	Hard (i)	(Canada) Daniel Nestor (Serbia) Nenad Zimonjić	2–6, 3–6
Win	56–38	Nov 2009	ATP World Tour Finals, UK (3)	Tour Finals	Hard (i)	(Belarus) Max Mirnyi (Israel) Andy Ram	7–6^{(7–5)}, 6–3
Win	57–38	Jan 2010	Australian Open, Australia (4)	Grand Slam	Hard	(Canada) Daniel Nestor (Serbia) Nenad Zimonjić	6–3, 6–7^{(5–7)}, 6–3
Win	58–38	Feb 2010	Delray Beach Open, US (2)	250 Series	Hard	(Germany) Philipp Marx (Slovakia) Igor Zelenay	6–3, 7–6^{(7–3)}
Win	59–38	Apr 2010	U.S. Men's Clay Court Championships, US (3)	250 Series	Clay	(Australia) Stephen Huss (South Africa) Wesley Moodie	6–3, 7–5
Win	60–38	May 2010	Italian Open, Italy (2)	Masters 1000	Clay	(United States) John Isner (United States) Sam Querrey	6–2, 6–3
Win	61–38	May 2010	Madrid Open, Spain (3)	Masters 1000	Clay	(Canada) Daniel Nestor (Serbia) Nenad Zimonjić	6–3, 6–4
Win	62–38	Aug 2010	Los Angeles Open, US (6)	250 Series	Hard	(United States) Eric Butorac (Netherlands Antilles) Jean-Julien Rojer	6–7^{(6–8)}, 6–2, [10–7]
Win	63–38	Aug 2010	Canadian Open, Canada (3)	Masters 1000	Hard	(France) Julien Benneteau (France) Michaël Llodra	7–5, 6–3
Win	64–38	Aug 2010	Cincinnati Masters, US (3)	Masters 1000	Hard	(India) Mahesh Bhupathi (Belarus) Max Mirnyi	6–3, 6–4
Win	65–38	Sep 2010	US Open, US (3)	Grand Slam	Hard	(India) Rohan Bopanna (Pakistan) Aisam-ul-Haq Qureshi	7–6^{(7–5)}, 7–6^{(7–4)}
Win	66–38	Oct 2010	China Open, China (2)	500 Series	Hard	(Poland) Mariusz Fyrstenberg (Poland) Marcin Matkowski	6–1, 7–6^{(7–5)}
Win	67–38	Nov 2010	Swiss Indoors, Switzerland (4)	500 Series	Hard (i)	(Canada) Daniel Nestor (Serbia) Nenad Zimonjić	6–3, 3–6, [10–3]
Loss	67–39	Jan 2011	Sydney International, Australia	250 Series	Hard	(Czech Republic) Lukáš Dlouhý (Australia) Paul Hanley	7–6^{(8–6)}, 3–6, [5–10]
Win	68–39	Jan 2011	Australian Open, Australia (5)	Grand Slam	Hard	(India) Mahesh Bhupathi (India) Leander Paes	6–3, 6–4
Win	69–39	Apr 2011	U.S. Men's Clay Court Championships, US (4)	250 Series	Clay	(United States) John Isner (United States) Sam Querrey	6–7^{(4–7)}, 6–2, [10–5]
Win	70–39	Apr 2011	Monte-Carlo Masters, Monaco (2)	Masters 1000	Clay	(Argentina) Juan Ignacio Chela (Brazil) Bruno Soares	6–3, 6–2
Loss	70–40	Apr 2011	Barcelona Open, Spain	500 Series	Clay	(Mexico) Santiago González (United States) Scott Lipsky	7–5, 2–6, [10–12]
Win	71–40	May 2011	Madrid Open, Spain (4)	Masters 1000	Clay	(France) Michaël Llodra (Serbia) Nenad Zimonjić	6–3, 6–3
Win	72–40	Jun 2011	Queen's Club Championships, UK (4)	250 Series	Grass	(India) Mahesh Bhupathi (India) Leander Paes	6–7^{(2–7)}, 7–6^{(7–4)}, [10–6]
Win	73–40	Jul 2011	Wimbledon Championships, UK (2)	Grand Slam	Grass	(Sweden) Robert Lindstedt (Romania) Horia Tecău	6–3, 6–4, 7–6^{(7–2)}
Loss	73–41	Aug 2011	Canadian Open, Canada	Masters 1000	Hard	(France) Michaël Llodra (Serbia) Nenad Zimonjić	4–6, 7–6^{(7–5)}, [5–10]
Win	74–41	Oct 2011	Vienna Open, Austria	250 Series	Hard (i)	(Belarus) Max Mirnyi (Canada) Daniel Nestor	7–6^{(12–10)}, 6–3
Win	75–41	Nov 2011	Valencia Open, Spain	500 Series	Hard (i)	(United States) Eric Butorac (Curaçao) Jean-Julien Rojer	6–4, 7–6^{(11–9)}
Win	76–41	Jan 2012	Sydney International, Australia (2)	250 Series	Hard	(Australia) Matthew Ebden (Finland) Jarkko Nieminen	6–1, 6–4
Loss	76–42	Jan 2012	Australian Open, Australia	Grand Slam	Hard	(India) Leander Paes (Czech Republic) Radek Štěpánek	6–7^{(1–7)}, 2–6
Win	77–42	Apr 2012	Monte-Carlo Masters, Monaco (3)	Masters 1000	Clay	(Belarus) Max Mirnyi (Canada) Daniel Nestor	6–2, 6–3
Win	78–42	May 2012	Open de Nice Côte d'Azur, France	250 Series	Clay	(Austria) Oliver Marach (Slovakia) Filip Polášek	7–6^{(7–5)}, 6–3
Loss	78–43	Jun 2012	French Open, France	Grand Slam	Clay	(Belarus) Max Mirnyi (Canada) Daniel Nestor	4–6, 4–6
Loss	78–44	Jun 2012	Queen's Club Championships, UK	250 Series	Grass	(Belarus) Max Mirnyi (Canada) Daniel Nestor	3–6, 4–6
Win	79–44	Aug 2012	Olympic Games, UK	Olympics	Grass	(France) Michaël Llodra (France) Jo-Wilfried Tsonga	6–4, 7–6^{(7–2)}
Win	80–44	Aug 2012	Canadian Open, Canada (4)	Masters 1000	Hard	(Spain) Marcel Granollers (Spain) Marc López	6–1, 4–6, [12–10]
Win	81–44	Sep 2012	US Open, US (4)	Grand Slam	Hard	(India) Leander Paes (Czech Republic) Radek Štepánek	6–3, 6–4
Win	82–44	Oct 2012	China Open, China (3)	500 Series	Hard	(Argentina) Carlos Berlocq (Uzbekistan) Denis Istomin	6–3, 6–2
Win	83–44	Jan 2013	Sydney International, Australia (3)	250 Series	Hard	(Belarus) Max Mirnyi (Romania) Horia Tecău	6–4, 6–4
Win	84–44	Jan 2013	Australian Open, Australia (6)	Grand Slam	Hard	(Netherlands) Robin Haase (Netherlands) Igor Sijsling	6–3, 6–4
Win	85–44	Feb 2013	U.S. National Indoor Tennis Championships, US (3)	500 Series	Hard (i)	(United States) James Blake (United States) Jack Sock	6–1, 6–2
Win	86–44	Mar 2013	Indian Wells Masters, US	Masters 1000	Hard	(Philippines) Treat Huey (Poland) Jerzy Janowicz	6–3, 3–6, [10–6]
Loss	86–45	Apr 2013	U.S. Men's Clay Court Championships, US	250 Series	Clay	(United Kingdom) Jamie Murray (Australia) John Peers	6–1, 6–7^{(3–7)}, [10–12]
Loss	86–46	Apr 2013	Monte-Carlo Masters, Monaco	Masters 1000	Clay	(France) Julien Benneteau (Serbia) Nenad Zimonjić	6–4, 6–7^{(4–7)}, [12–14]
Win	87–46	May 2013	Madrid Open, Spain (5)	Masters 1000	Clay	(Austria) Alexander Peya (Brazil) Bruno Soares	6–2, 6–3
Win	88–46	May 2013	Italian Open, Italy (3)	Masters 1000	Clay	(India) Mahesh Bhupathi (India) Rohan Bopanna	6–2, 6–3
Win	89–46	Jun 2013	French Open, France (2)	Grand Slam	Clay	(France) Michaël Llodra (France) Nicolas Mahut	6–4, 4–6, 7–6^{(7–4)}
Win	90–46	Jun 2013	Queen's Club Championships, UK (5)	250 Series	Grass	(Austria) Alexander Peya (Brazil) Bruno Soares	4–6, 7–5, [10–3]
Win	91–46	Jul 2013	Wimbledon Championships, UK (3)	Grand Slam	Grass	(Croatia) Ivan Dodig (Brazil) Marcelo Melo	3–6, 6–3, 6–4, 6–4
Win	92–46	Aug 2013	Cincinnati Masters, US (4)	Masters 1000	Hard	(Spain) Marcel Granollers (Spain) Marc López	6–4, 4–6, [10–4]
Loss	92–47	Oct 2013	Valencia Open, Spain	500 Series	Hard (i)	(Austria) Alexander Peya (Brazil) Bruno Soares	6–7^{(3–7)}, 7–6^{(7–1)}, [11–13]
Win	93–47	Nov 2013	Paris Masters, France (3)	Masters 1000	Hard (i)	(Austria) Alexander Peya (Brazil) Bruno Soares	6–3, 6–3
Loss	93–48	Nov 2013	ATP World Tour Finals, UK	Tour Finals	Hard (i)	(Spain) David Marrero (Spain) Fernando Verdasco	5–7, 7–6^{(7–3)}, [7–10]
Loss	93–49	Feb 2014	U.S. National Indoor Tennis Championships, US	500 Series	Hard (i)	(United States) Eric Butorac (South Africa) Raven Klaasen	6–4, 6–4
Win	94–49	Feb 2014	Delray Beach Open, US (3)	250 Series	Hard	(Czech Republic) František Čermák (Russia) Mikhail Elgin	6–2, 6–3
Win	95–49	Mar 2014	Indian Wells Masters, US (2)	Masters 1000	Hard	(Austria) Alexander Peya (Brazil) Bruno Soares	6–4, 6–3
Win	96–49	Apr 2014	Miami Open, US (3)	Masters 1000	Hard	(Colombia) Juan Sebastián Cabal (Colombia) Robert Farah	7–6^{(10–8)}, 6–4
Win	97–49	Apr 2014	U.S. Men's Clay Court Championships, US (5)	250 Series	Clay	(Spain) David Marrero (Spain) Fernando Verdasco	4–6, 6–4, [11–9]
Win	98–49	Apr 2014	Monte-Carlo Masters, Monaco (4)	Masters 1000	Clay	(Croatia) Ivan Dodig (Brazil) Marcelo Melo	6–3, 3–6, [10–8]
Loss	98–50	May 2014	Madrid Open, Spain	Masters 1000	Clay	(Canada) Daniel Nestor (Serbia) Nenad Zimonjić	4–6, 2–6
Loss	98–51	Jul 2014	Wimbledon Championships, UK	Grand Slam	Grass	(Canada) Vasek Pospisil (United States) Jack Sock	6–7^{(5–7)}, 7–6^{(7–3)}, 4–6, 6–3, 5–7
Win	99–51	Aug 2014	Cincinnati Masters, US (5)	Masters 1000	Hard	(Canada) Vasek Pospisil (United States) Jack Sock	6–3, 6–2
Win	100–51	Sep 2014	US Open, US (5)	Grand Slam	Hard	(Spain) Marcel Granollers (Spain) Marc López	6–3, 6–4
Win	101–51	Oct 2014	Shanghai Masters, China	Masters 1000	Hard	(France) Julien Benneteau (France) Édouard Roger-Vasselin	6–3, 7–6^{(7–3)}
Win	102–51	Nov 2014	Paris Masters, France (4)	Masters 1000	Hard (i)	(Poland) Marcin Matkowski (Austria) Jürgen Melzer	7–6^{(7–5)}, 5–7, [10–6]
Win	103–51	Nov 2014	ATP World Tour Finals, UK (4)	Tour Finals	Hard (i)	(Croatia) Ivan Dodig (Brazil) Marcelo Melo	6–7^{(5–7)}, 6–2, [10–7]
Win	104–51	Feb 2015	Delray Beach Open, US (4)	250 Series	Hard	(South Africa) Raven Klaasen (India) Leander Paes	6–3, 3–6, [10–6]
Win	105–51	Apr 2015	Miami Open, US (4)	Masters 1000	Hard	(Canada) Vasek Pospisil (United States) Jack Sock	6–3, 1–6, [10–8]
Win	106–51	Apr 2015	Monte-Carlo Masters, Monaco (5)	Masters 1000	Clay	(Italy) Simone Bolelli (Italy) Fabio Fognini	7–6^{(7–3)}, 6–1
Loss	106–52	Jun 2015	French Open, France	Grand Slam	Clay	(Croatia) Ivan Dodig (Brazil) Marcelo Melo	7–6^{(7–5)}, 6–7^{(5–7)}, 5–7
Win	107–52	Aug 2015	Atlanta Open, US	250 Series	Hard	(United Kingdom) Colin Fleming (Luxembourg) Gilles Müller	4–6, 7–6^{(7–2)}, [10–4]
Win	108–52	Aug 2015	Washington Open, US (4)	500 Series	Hard	(Croatia) Ivan Dodig (Brazil) Marcelo Melo	6–4, 6–2
Win	109–52	Aug 2015	Canadian Open, Canada (5)	Masters 1000	Hard	(Canada) Daniel Nestor (France) Édouard Roger-Vasselin	7–6^{(7–5)}, 3–6, [10–6]
Loss	109–53	Feb 2016	Delray Beach Open, US	250 Series	Hard	(Austria) Oliver Marach (France) Fabrice Martin	6–3, 6–7^{(7–9)}, [11–13]
Win	110–53	Apr 2016	U.S. Men's Clay Court Championships, US (6)	250 Series	Clay	(Dominican Republic) Víctor Estrella Burgos (Mexico) Santiago González	4–6, 6–3, [10–8]
Win	111–53	May 2016	Barcelona Open, Spain (3)	500 Series	Clay	(Uruguay) Pablo Cuevas (Spain) Marcel Granollers	7–5, 7–5
Win	112–53	May 2016	Italian Open, Italy (4)	Masters 1000	Clay	(Canada) Vasek Pospisil (United States) Jack Sock	2–6, 6–3, [10–7]
Loss	112–54	Jun 2016	French Open, France	Grand Slam	Clay	(Spain) Feliciano López (Spain) Marc López	4–6, 7–6^{(8–6)}, 3–6
Loss	112–55	Jan 2017	Australian Open, Australia	Grand Slam	Hard	(Finland) Henri Kontinen (Australia) John Peers	5–7, 5–7
Win	113–55	Jun 2017	Eastbourne International, UK	250 Series	Grass	(India) Rohan Bopanna (Brazil) André Sá	6–7^{(4–7)}, 6–4, [10–3]
Win	114–55	Aug 2017	Atlanta Open, US (2)	250 Series	Hard	(Netherlands) Wesley Koolhof (New Zealand) Artem Sitak	6–3, 6–4
Loss	114–56	Mar 2018	Mexican Open, Mexico	500 Series	Hard	(United Kingdom) Jamie Murray (Brazil) Bruno Soares	6–7^{(4–7)}, 5–7
Loss	114–57	Mar 2018	Indian Wells Masters, US	Masters 1000	Hard	(United States) John Isner (United States) Jack Sock	6–7^{(4–7)}, 6–7^{(2–7)}
Win	115–57	Mar 2018	Miami Open, US (5)	Masters 1000	Hard	(Russia) Karen Khachanov (Russia) Andrey Rublev	4-6, 7-6^{(7-5)}, [10–4]
Win	116–57	Apr 2018	Monte-Carlo Masters, Monaco (6)	Masters 1000	Clay	(Austria) Oliver Marach (Croatia) Mate Pavić	7–6^{(7–5)}, 6–3
Loss	116–58	May 2018	Madrid Open, Spain	Masters 1000	Clay	(Croatia) Nikola Mektić (Austria) Alexander Peya	3–5, ret.
Win	117–58	Feb 2019	Delray Beach Open, US (5)	250 Series	Hard	(United Kingdom) Ken Skupski (United Kingdom) Neal Skupski	7–6^{(7–5)}, 6–4
Win	118–58	Mar 2019	Miami Open, US (6)	Masters 1000	Hard	(Netherlands) Wesley Koolhof (Greece) Stefanos Tsitsipas	7–5, 7–6^{(10–8)}
Loss	118–59	Jul 2019	Atlanta Open, US	250 Series	Hard	(United Kingdom) Dominic Inglot (United States) Austin Krajicek	4–6, 7–6^{(7–5)}, [9–11]
Win	119–59	Feb 2020	Delray Beach Open, US (6)	250 Series	Hard	(United Kingdom) Luke Bambridge (Japan) Ben McLachlan	3–6, 7–5, [10–5]

=== Mike individually ===
==== Doubles: 8 (5 titles, 3 runner-ups) ====
Legend (pre/post 2009) Grand Slam tournaments (2–0) Tennis Masters Cup / ATP World Tour Finals (1–0) ATP Masters Series / ATP World Tour Masters 1000 (0–0) Olympic Games (0–0) ATP International Series Gold / ATP World Tour 500 Series (0–2) ATP International Series / ATP World Tour 250 Series (2–1)	Finals by surface Hard (3–2) Clay (0–1) Grass (2–0) Carpet (0–0)	Finals by setting Outdoor (4–2) Indoor (1–1)

Result	W–L	Date	Tournament	Tier	Surface	Partner	Opponents	Score
Loss	0–1	May 2002	St. Pölten International, Austria	International	Clay	(Australia) Michael Hill	(Czech Republic) Petr Pála (Czech Republic) David Rikl	5–7, 4–6
Win	1–1	Jun 2002	Nottingham Open, UK	International	Grass	(The Bahamas) Mark Knowles	(United States) Donald Johnson (United States) Jared Palmer	0–6, 7–6^{(7–3)}, 6–4
Win	2–1	Aug 2002	Long Island Open, US	International	Hard	(India) Mahesh Bhupathi	(Czech Republic) Petr Pála (Czech Republic) Pavel Vízner	6–3, 6–4
Win	3–1	Jul 2018	Wimbledon Championships, UK	Grand Slam	Grass	(United States) Jack Sock	(South Africa) Raven Klaasen (New Zealand) Michael Venus	6–3, 6–7^{(7–9)}, 6–3, 5–7, 7–5
Loss	3–2	Aug 2018	Washington Open, US	500 Series	Hard	(France) Édouard Roger-Vasselin	(United Kingdom) Jamie Murray (Brazil) Bruno Soares	6–3, 3–6, [4–10]
Win	4–2	Sep 2018	US Open, US	Grand Slam	Hard	(United States) Jack Sock	(Poland) Łukasz Kubot (Brazil) Marcelo Melo	6–3, 6–1
Loss	4–3	Oct 2018	Vienna Open, Austria	500 Series	Hard (i)	(France) Édouard Roger-Vasselin	(United Kingdom) Joe Salisbury (United Kingdom) Neal Skupski	6–7^{(5–7)}, 3–6
Win	5–3	Nov 2018	ATP Finals, UK	Tour Finals	Hard (i)	(United States) Jack Sock	(France) Pierre-Hugues Herbert (France) Nicolas Mahut	5–7, 6–1, [13–11]

== Davis Cup record ==
=== As a team (25–5) ===
Group membership World Group (21–5) Qualifying round (1–0) WG play-offs (3–0)	Matches by surface Hard (11–5) Clay (11–0) Grass (2–0) Carpet (1–0)	Matches by setting Indoors (15–3) Outdoors (10–2)	Matches by venue USA (12–5) Away (13–0)

Result	W–L	Year	Round	Host	Surface	Opponent	Score	Team result
Win	1–0	2003	Play-offs	SVK	Clay	Slovakia (Beck / Hrbatý)	6–1, 6–4, 7–6^{(7–5)}	3–2
Win	2–0	2004	1st round	USA	Hard (i)	Austria (Knowle / J. Melzer)	6–2, 6–1, 6–4	5–0
Win	3–0	2004	Quarterfinals	USA	Hard	Sweden (Björkman / T. Johansson)	6–3, 6–3, 6–4	4–1
Win	4–0	2004	Semifinals	USA	Hard	Belarus (Mirnyi / Volchkov)|	6–1, 6–3, 7–5	4–0
Win	5–0	2004	Final	ESP	Clay (i)	Spain (Ferrero / Robredo)	6–0, 6–3, 6–2	2–3
Loss	5–1	2005	1st round	USA	Hard	Croatia (Ančić / Ljubičić)	6–3, 6–7^{(8–10)}, 4–6, 4–6	2–3
Win	6–1	2005	Play-offs	BEL	Clay (i)	Belgium (Rochus / Vliegen)	6–3, 6–7^{(2–7)}, 6–1, 6–3	4–1
Win	7–1	2006	1st round	USA	Hard	Romania (Hănescu / Tecău)	6–2, 0–0, ret.	4–1
Win	8–1	2006	Quarterfinals	USA	Grass	Chile (Capdeville / Garcia)	6–1, 6–2, 6–4	3–2
Win	9–1	2006	Semifinals	RUS	Clay (i)	Russia (Tursunov / Youzhny)	6–3, 6–4, 6–2	2–3
Win	10–1	2007	1st round	CZE	Clay (i)	Czech Republic (Dlouhý / Vízner)	6–4, 6–4, 6–4	4–1
Win	11–1	2007	Quarterfinals	USA	Hard (i)	Spain (F. López / Verdasco)	7–5, 6–3, 3–6, 7–6^{(7–5)}	4–1
Win	12–1	2007	Semifinals	SWE	Carpet (i)	Sweden (Aspelin / Björkman)	7–6^{(13–11)}, 6–2, 6–3	4–1
Win	13–1	2007	Final	USA	Hard (i)	Russia (Andreev / Davydenko)	7–6^{(7–4)}, 6–4, 6–2	4–1
Win	14–1	2008	1st round	AUT	Clay (i)	Austria (Knowle / J. Melzer)	6–1, 6–4, 6–2	4–1
Loss	14–2	2008	Quarterfinals	USA	Hard (i)	France (Clément / Llodra)	7–6^{(9–7)}, 5–7, 3–6, 4–6	4–1
Win	15–2	2009	1st round	USA	Hard (i)	Switzerland (Allegro / Wawrinka)	6–3, 6–4, 3–6, 7–6^{(7–2)}	4–1
Win	16–2	2009	Quarterfinals	CRO	Clay (i)	Croatia (Karanusic / Zovko)	6–3, 6–1, 6–3	2–3
Win	17–2	2011	1st round	CHI	Clay	Chile (Aguilar / Massú)	6–3, 6–3, 7–6^{(7–4)}	4–1
Win	18–2	2011	Semifinals	USA	Hard (i)	Spain (Granollers / Verdasco)	6–7^{(3–7)}, 6–4, 6–4, 6–4	1–3
Win	19–2	2012	Quarterfinals	FRA	Clay	France (Benneteau / Llodra)	6–4, 6–4, 7–6^{(7–4)}	3–2
Win	20–2	2012	Semifinals	ESP	Clay	Spain (Granollers / M. López)	6–3, 3–6, 7–5, 7–5	1–3
Loss	20–3	2013	1st round	USA	Hard (i)	Brazil (Melo / Soares)	6–7^{(6–8)}, 7–6^{(9–7)}, 4–6, 6–3, 3–6	3–2
Loss	20–4	2013	Quarterfinals	USA	Hard (i)	Serbia (Zimonjić / Bozoljac)	6–7^{(5–7)}, 6–7^{(1–7)}, 7–5, 6–4, 13–15	1–3
Win	21–4	2014	1st round	USA	Clay	(United Kingdom) Great Britain (Fleming / Inglot)	6–2, 6–3, 3–6, 6–1	1–3
Win	22–4	2014	Play-offs	USA	Hard (i)	Slovakia (Lacko / Gombos)	6–1, 6–2, 6–1	5–0
Win	23–4	2015	1st round	GBR	Hard (i)	(United Kingdom) Great Britain (Inglot / J. Murray)	6–3, 6–2, 3–6, 6–7^{(8–10)}, 9–7	2–3
Win	24–4	2016	1st round	AUS	Grass	Australia (Hewitt / Peers)	6–3, 6–3, 4–6, 4–6, 6–3	3–1
Loss	24–5	2016	Quarterfinals	USA	Hard	Croatia (Čilić / Dodig)	2–6, 6–2, 2–6, 4–6	2–3
Win	25–5	2020	Qualifying Round	USA	Hard (i)	Uzbekistan (Fayziev / Istomin)	6–3, 6–4	4–0

=== Bob & Mike individually ===
Result	W–L	Year	Round	Host	Surface	Partner	Opponent	Score	Team Result
Bob individually
Win	1–0	2010	1st round	SRB	Clay (i)	John Isner	Serbia (Tipsarević / Zimonjić)	7–6^{(10–8)}, 5–7, 7–6^{(10–8)}, 6–3	2–3
Mike individually
Win	1–0	2008	Semifinal	ESP	Clay	Mardy Fish	Spain (F. López / Verdasco)	4–6, 6–4, 6–3, 4–6, 6–4	1–4
Win	2–0	2012	1st round	SUI	Clay (i)	Mardy Fish	Switzerland (Federer / Wawrinka)	4–6, 6–3, 6–3, 6–3	5–0
Win	3–0	2018	Semifinal	CRO	Clay	Ryan Harrison	Croatia (Dodig / Pavić)	7–5, 7–6^{(8–6)}, 1–6, 6–7^{(5–7)}, 7–6^{(7–5)}	2–3

== Notes ==
Awards
Preceded by (The Bahamas) Mark Knowles & (Canada) Daniel Nestor (Serbia) Nenad Zimonjić & (Canada) Daniel Nestor	ITF Men's doubles World Champion; 2003–07; 2009–14	Succeeded by (Serbia) Nenad Zimonjić & (Canada) Daniel Nestor (Netherlands) Jean-Julien Rojer & (Romania) Horia Tecău
Preceded by (The Bahamas) Mark Knowles & (Canada) Daniel Nestor (The Bahamas) Mark Knowles & (Canada) Daniel Nestor (Serbia) Nenad Zimonjić & (Canada) Daniel Nestor	ATP Doubles Team of the Year; 2003; 2005–07; 2009–14	Succeeded by (The Bahamas) Mark Knowles & (Canada) Daniel Nestor (Serbia) Nenad Zimonjić & (Canada) Daniel Nestor (Netherlands) Jean-Julien Rojer & (Romania) Horia Tecău
Preceded by None	ATP Fans' Favorite Doubles Team; 2005–17	Succeeded by (United States) Mike Bryan & (United States) Jack Sock
Preceded by (United Kingdom) Andy Murray	Arthur Ashe Humanitarian of the Year; 2015	Succeeded by (Croatia) Marin Čilić
