= 2016 U.S. Men's Clay Court Championships – Singles =

Singles
- 2016 U.S. Men's Clay Court Championships

Final
- Champion: (Argentina) Juan Mónaco
- Runner-up: (United States) Jack Sock
- Score: 3–6, 6–3, 7–5

Details
- Draw: 28
- Seeds: 8

Events
Singles	Doubles
- U.S. Men's Clay Court Championships

Jack Sock was the defending champion, but lost in the final to Juan Mónaco, 6–3, 3–6, 5–7.

== Seeds ==
The top four seeds receive a bye into the second round.

1. (United States) John Isner (semifinals)
2. (France) Benoît Paire (second round)
3. (Spain) Feliciano López (semifinals)
4. (United States) Jack Sock (final)
5. (United States) Sam Querrey (quarterfinals)
6. (United States) Steve Johnson (first round)
7. (Cyprus) Marcos Baghdatis (quarterfinals)
8. (Italy) Paolo Lorenzi (first round)

== Draw ==
Key

- Q = Qualifier
- WC = Wild card
- LL = Lucky loser
- Alt = Alternate
- ITF = ITF entry
- PR = Protected ranking
- SR = Special ranking
- SE = Special exempt
- JE = Junior exempt
- JR = Junior Accelerator Programme entrant
- CO = College Accelerator Programme entrant
- NG = Next Gen Accelerator Program entrant
- w/o = Walkover
- r = Retired
- d = Defaulted

=== Finals ===
Semifinals
1	(United States) John Isner	6^{4}	3
4	(United States) Jack Sock	7^{7}	6
3	(Spain) Feliciano López	4	2
(Argentina) Juan Mónaco	6	6

Final
4	(United States) Jack Sock	6	3	5
(Argentina) Juan Mónaco	3	6	7

=== Top half ===
First round
(United States) D Kudla	3	7^{7}	7^{7}
Q	(Germany) M Zverev	6	6^{2}	6^{2}
(Dominican Republic) V Estrella Burgos	4	7^{7}	0
(South Korea) H Chung	6	6^{5}	6
WC	(United States) T Paul	6	6
8	(Italy) P Lorenzi	2	3
WC	(United States) F Tiafoe	3	4
Q	(Australia) M Barton	6	6
(Spain) F Verdasco	6	6
Q	(Argentina) C Berlocq	4	3
(Argentina) D Schwartzman	0	0
7	(Cyprus) M Baghdatis	6	6

Second round
1	(United States) J Isner	7^{7}	7^{7}
(United States) D Kudla	6^{2}	6^{4}
(South Korea) H Chung	5	6	6
WC	(United States) T Paul	7	2	2
4	(United States) J Sock	6	7^{7}
Q	(Australia) M Barton	2	6^{5}
(Spain) F Verdasco	4	3
7	(Cyprus) M Baghdatis	6	6

Quarterfinals
1	(United States) J Isner	7^{7}	6
(South Korea) H Chung	6^{5}	4
4	(United States) J Sock	6	6
7	(Cyprus) M Baghdatis	4	4

Semifinals
1	(United States) J Isner	6^{4}	3
4	(United States) J Sock	7^{7}	6

=== Bottom half ===
First round
6	(United States) S Johnson	4	3
(United States) D Young	6	6
Q	(Argentina) N Kicker	6	6^{5}	4
WC	(United States) T Smyczek	4	7^{7}	6
(Slovakia) L Lacko	6	7
PR	(Russia) D Tursunov	1	5
5	(United States) S Querrey	6	7^{7}
LL	(United States) R Opelka	4	6^{4}
(Germany) B Becker	7^{8}	6
(Germany) M Berrer	6^{6}	0
(Austria) G Melzer	2	7^{7}	4
(Argentina) J Mónaco	6	6^{3}	6

Second round
(United States) D Young	2	4
WC	(United States) T Smyczek	6	6
(Slovakia) L Lacko	6^{4}	1
3	(Spain) F López	7^{7}	6
5	(United States) S Querrey	6	6
(Germany) B Becker	3	3
(Argentina) J Mónaco	6	7
2	(France) B Paire	3	5

Quarterfinals
WC	(United States) T Smyczek	2	3
3	(Spain) F López	6	6
5	(United States) S Querrey	4	4
(Argentina) J Mónaco	6	6

Semifinals
3	(Spain) F López	4	2
(Argentina) J Mónaco	6	6

== Qualifying ==
=== Seeds ===
1. (United States) Bjorn Fratangelo (qualifying competition)
2. (Argentina) Carlos Berlocq (qualified)
3. (United States) Jared Donaldson (qualifying competition)
4. (United States) Dennis Novikov (first round)
5. (Argentina) Nicolás Kicker (qualified)
6. (Germany) Mischa Zverev (qualified)
7. (Argentina) Guido Andreozzi (first round)
8. (Brazil) Guilherme Clezar (first round)

=== Qualifiers ===
1. (Germany) Mischa Zverev
2. (Argentina) Carlos Berlocq
3. (Argentina) Nicolás Kicker
4. (Australia) Matthew Barton

=== Lucky losers ===
1. (United States) Reilly Opelka

=== Qualifying draw ===
==== First qualifier ====
First round
1	(United States) Bjorn Fratangelo	6	7
(United States) Ernesto Escobedo	2	5
(United States) Michael Mmoh	2	0^{r}
6	(Germany) Mischa Zverev	6	4

Qualifying competition
1	(United States) Bjorn Fratangelo	3	1
6	(Germany) Mischa Zverev	6	6

==== Second qualifier ====
First round
2	(Argentina) Carlos Berlocq	6	6
Alt	(United States) David Warren	0	2
WC	(United States) Brian Baker	6	7^{7}
8	(Brazil) Guilherme Clezar	2	6^{3}

Qualifying competition
2	(Argentina) Carlos Berlocq	6	6
WC	(United States) Brian Baker	4	0

==== Third qualifier ====
First round
3	(United States) Jared Donaldson	6	2	6
(Switzerland) Henri Laaksonen	1	6	4
(Ecuador) Giovanni Lapentti	5	6	4
5	(Argentina) Nicolás Kicker	7	1	6

Qualifying competition
3	(United States) Jared Donaldson	6	1	6^{5}
5	(Argentina) Nicolás Kicker	4	6	7^{7}

==== Fourth qualifier ====
First round
4	(United States) Dennis Novikov	4	3
WC	(United States) Reilly Opelka	6	6
(Australia) Matthew Barton	6	6
7	(Argentina) Guido Andreozzi	3	4

Qualifying competition
WC	(United States) Reilly Opelka	6^{2}	1
(Australia) Matthew Barton	7^{7}	6
