= 2016 U.S. Men's Clay Court Championships – Doubles =

Doubles
- 2016 U.S. Men's Clay Court Championships

Final
- Champions: (United States) Bob Bryan (United States) Mike Bryan
- Runners-up: (Dominican Republic) Víctor Estrella Burgos (Mexico) Santiago González
- Score: 4–6, 6–3, [10–8]

Details
- Draw: 16
- Seeds: 4

Events
| Singles | Doubles |
- U.S. Men's Clay Court Championships

Ričardas Berankis and Teymuraz Gabashvili were the defending champions, but Berankis chose not to compete this year and Gabashvilli chose to participate in Marrakesh instead.
Bob and Mike Bryan won the title, defeating Víctor Estrella Burgos and Santiago González in the final, 4–6, 6–3, [10–8].

== Seeds ==
1. (United States) Bob Bryan / (United States) Mike Bryan (champions)
2. (Germany) Philipp Petzschner / (Austria) Alexander Peya (quarterfinals, withdrew)
3. (United States) Eric Butorac / (United States) Scott Lipsky (quarterfinals)
4. (United States) Steve Johnson / (United States) Sam Querrey (semifinals)

== Draw ==
Key

- Q = Qualifier
- WC = Wild card
- LL = Lucky loser
- Alt = Alternate
- ITF = ITF entry
- PR = Protected ranking
- SR = Special ranking
- SE = Special exempt
- JE = Junior exempt
- JR = Junior Accelerator Programme entrant
- CO = College Accelerator Programme entrant
- NG = Next Gen Accelerator Program entrant
- w/o = Walkover
- r = Retired
- d = Defaulted

=== Draw ===
First round
1 | (United States) B Bryan (United States) M Bryan | 3 | 6 | [11]
(United States) D Kudla (United States) D Young | 6 | 1 | [9]
(United States) N Monroe (United Kingdom) N Skupski | 6^{6} | 6 | [4]
WC | (United States) R Opelka (United States) T Paul | 7^{8} | 4 | [10]
4 | (United States) S Johnson (United States) S Querrey | 6 | 6
(Argentina) C Berlocq (France) B Paire | 4 | 0
(Australia) C Guccione (Brazil) A Sá | 5 | 7^{7} | [10]
(Austria) J Knowle (Slovakia) I Zelenay | 7 | 6^{3} | [2]
PR | (United States) B Baker (Russia) D Tursunov | 6 | 3 | [6]
(Dominican Republic) V Estrella Burgos (Mexico) S González | 1 | 6 | [10]
WC | (New Zealand) M Daniell (New Zealand) A Sitak | 4 | 4
3 | (United States) E Butorac (United States) S Lipsky | 6 | 6
Alt | (Argentina) G Andreozzi (Argentina) N Kicker | 6 | 1 | [8]
(South Korea) H Chung (Chile) J Peralta | 3 | 6 | [10]
(Italy) P Lorenzi (Argentina) D Schwartzman | 6^{1} | 6^{3}
2 | (Germany) P Petzschner (Austria) A Peya | 7^{7} | 7^{7}

Quarterfinals
1 | (United States) B Bryan (United States) M Bryan | 6 | 6
WC | (United States) R Opelka (United States) T Paul | 4 | 3
4 | (United States) S Johnson (United States) S Querrey | 6 | 2 | [10]
(Australia) C Guccione (Brazil) A Sá | 3 | 6 | [8]
(Dominican Republic) V Estrella Burgos (Mexico) S González | 6 | 7^{7}
3 | (United States) E Butorac (United States) S Lipsky | 4 | 6^{4}
(South Korea) H Chung (Chile) J Peralta | w/o
2 | (Germany) P Petzschner (Austria) A Peya

Semifinals
1 | (United States) B Bryan (United States) M Bryan | 7^{7} | 6
4 | (United States) S Johnson (United States) S Querrey | 6^{5} | 3
(Dominican Republic) V Estrella Burgos (Mexico) S González | 6 | 4 | [10]
(South Korea) H Chung (Chile) J Peralta | 3 | 6 | [7]

Final
1 | (United States) B Bryan (United States) M Bryan | 4 | 6 | [10]
(Dominican Republic) V Estrella Burgos (Mexico) S González | 6 | 3 | [8]
