= 2016 U.S. Men's Clay Court Championships =

- Date: April 4–10
- Edition: 48th
- Category: World Tour 250
- Draw: 28S / 16D
- Prize money: $515,025
- Surface: Clay
- Location: Houston, Texas, United States
- Venue: River Oaks Country Club

Champions

Singles
- (Argentina) Juan Mónaco

Doubles
- (United States) Bob Bryan / (United States) Mike Bryan
- U.S. Men's Clay Court Championships

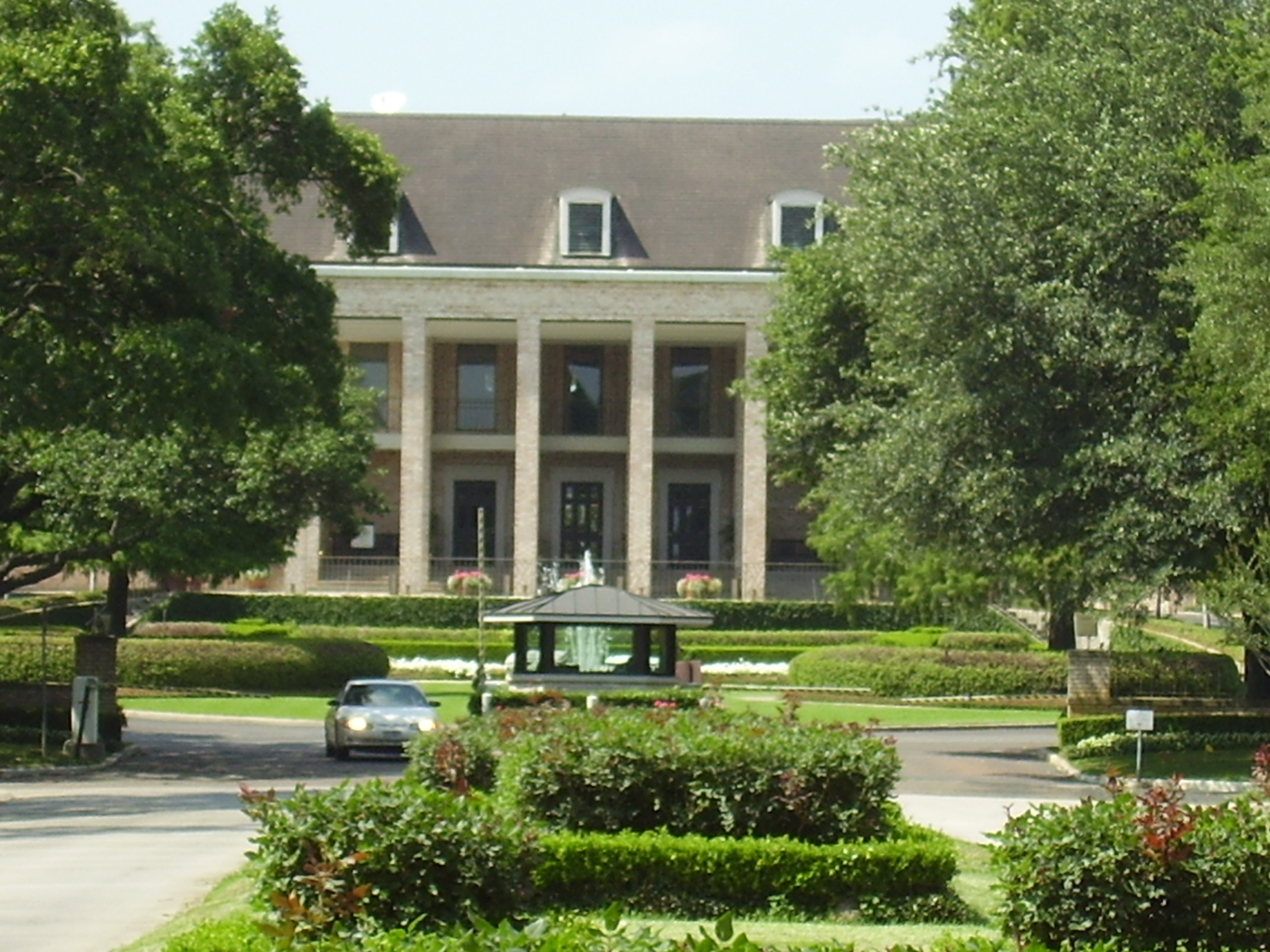
River Oaks Country Club

The 2016 U.S. Men's Clay Court Championships (also known as the Fayez Sarofim & Co. U.S. Men's Clay Court Championships for sponsorship purposes) was a tennis tournament played on outdoor clay courts. It was the 48th edition of the U.S. Men's Clay Court Championships, and an ATP World Tour 250 event on the 2016 ATP World Tour. It took place at River Oaks Country Club in Houston, Texas, United States, from April 4 through April 10, 2016. Unseeded Juan Mónaco won the singles title.

== Finals ==
=== Singles ===
- (Argentina) Juan Mónaco defeated (United States) Jack Sock, 3–6, 6–3, 7–5

=== Doubles ===
- (United States) Bob Bryan / (United States) Mike Bryan defeated (Dominican Republic) Víctor Estrella Burgos / (Mexico) Santiago González, 4–6, 6–3, [10–8]

== Singles main-draw entrants ==
=== Seeds ===
Country	Player	Rank^{1}	Seed
USA	John Isner	13	1
FRA	Benoît Paire	22	2
ESP	Feliciano López	23	3
USA	Jack Sock	24	4
USA	Sam Querrey	34	5
USA	Steve Johnson	36	6
CYP	Marcos Baghdatis	40	7
ITA	Paolo Lorenzi	54	8

- Rankings are as of March 21, 2016.

=== Other entrants ===
The following players received wildcards into the main draw:

- (United States) Tommy Paul
- (United States) Frances Tiafoe
- (United States) Tim Smyczek

The following player received entry with a protected ranking:

- (Russia) Dmitry Tursunov

The following players received entry via the qualifying draw:

- (Australia) Matthew Barton
- (Argentina) Carlos Berlocq
- (Argentina) Nicolás Kicker
- (Germany) Mischa Zverev

The following player received entry as a lucky loser:

- (United States) Reilly Opelka

=== Withdrawals ===
Before the tournament

- (South Africa) Kevin Anderson → replaced by (Russia) Dmitry Tursunov
- (Kazakhstan) Mikhail Kukushkin → replaced by (Slovakia) Lukáš Lacko
- (Argentina) Leonardo Mayer → replaced by (Germany) Benjamin Becker
- (Australia) John Millman → replaced by (United States) Reilly Opelka

== Doubles main-draw entrants ==
=== Seeds ===
Country	Player	Country	Player	Rank^{1}	Seed
USA	Bob Bryan	USA	Mike Bryan	11	1
AUT	Alexander Peya	GER	Philipp Petzschner	63	2
USA	Eric Butorac	USA	Scott Lipsky	89	3
USA	Steve Johnson	USA	Sam Querrey	90	4

- Rankings are as of March 21, 2016.

=== Other entrants ===
The following pairs received wildcards into the doubles main draw:

- (New Zealand) Marcus Daniell / (New Zealand) Artem Sitak
- (United States) Reilly Opelka / (United States) Tommy Paul

The following pair received entry as alternates:

- (Argentina) Guido Andreozzi / (Argentina) Nicolás Kicker

=== Withdrawals ===
Before the tournament

- (Germany) Dustin Brown (wrist injury)

During the tournament

- (Germany) Philipp Petzschner (knee injury)
