= Vasek Pospisil career statistics =

Tennis player statistics

Career finals
Discipline	Type	Won	Lost	Total	WR
Singles	Grand Slam	–	–	–	–
Singles	Summer Olympics	–	–	–	–
Singles	ATP Finals	–	–	–	–
Singles	ATP 1000	–	–	–	–
Singles	ATP 500 & 250	0	3	3	–
Singles	Total	0	3	3	–
Doubles	Grand Slam	1	0	1	–
Doubles	Summer Olympics	–	–	–	–
Doubles	ATP Finals	–	–	–	–
Doubles	ATP 1000	1	5	6	–
Doubles	ATP 500 & 250	5	3	8	–
Doubles	Total	7	8	15	–
Total		7	11	18	–

This is a list of the main career statistics of professional Canadian tennis player Vasek Pospisil.

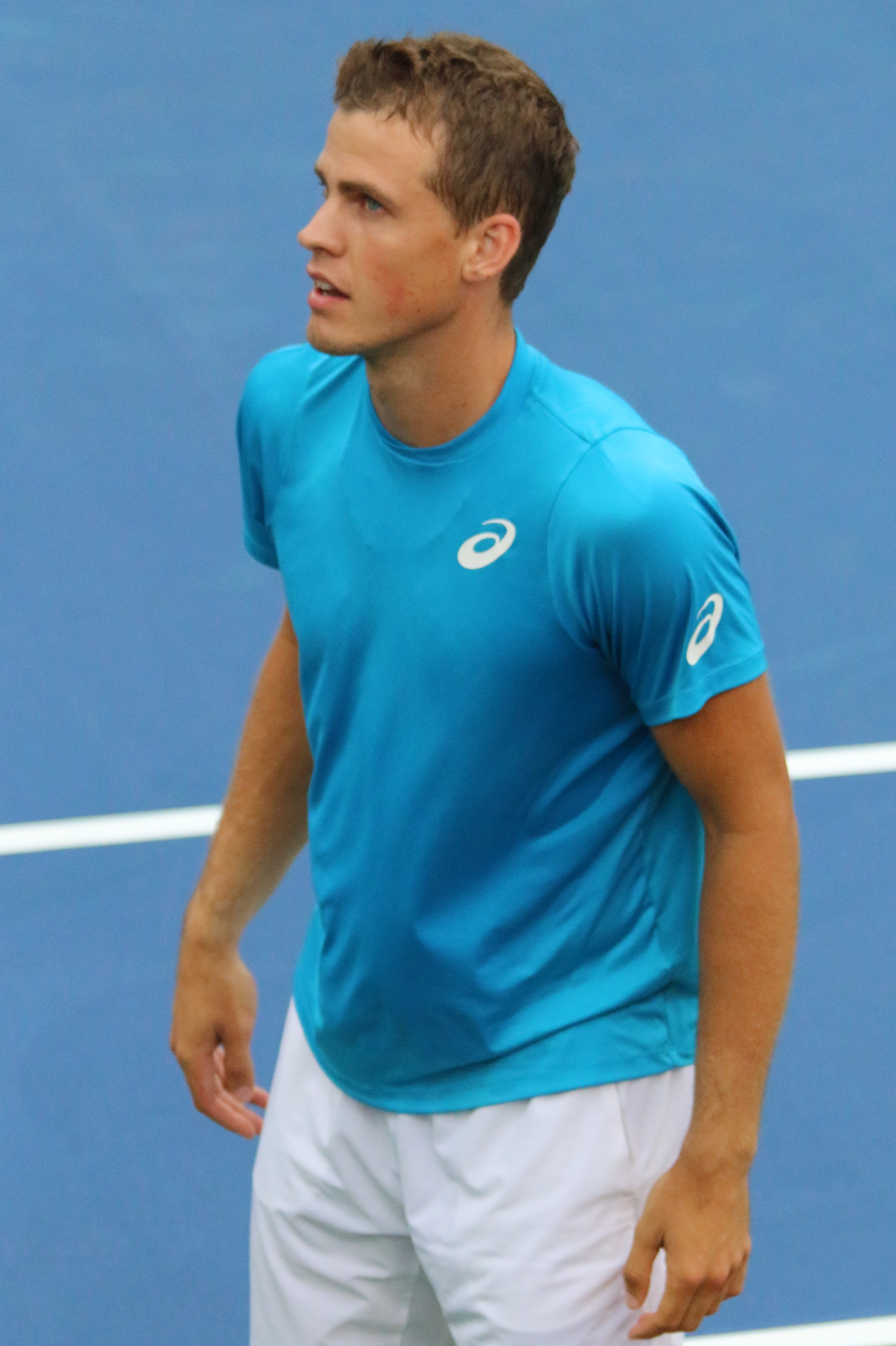
Pospisil at the 2016 US Open

== Performance timelines ==
Key
W	F	SF	QF	#R	RR	Q#	P#	DNQ	A	Z#	PO	G	S	B	NMS	NTI	P	NH

(W) winner; (F) finalist; (SF) semifinalist; (QF) quarterfinalist; (#R) rounds 4, 3, 2, 1; (RR) round-robin stage; (Q#) qualification round; (P#) preliminary round; (DNQ) did not qualify; (A) absent; (Z#) Davis/Fed Cup Zonal Group (with number indication) or (PO) play-off; (G) gold, (S) silver or (B) bronze Olympic/Paralympic medal; (NMS) not a Masters tournament; (NTI) not a Tier I tournament; (P) postponed; (NH) not held; (SR) strike rate (events won / competed); (W–L) win–loss record.
To avoid confusion and double counting, these charts are updated at the conclusion of a tournament or when the player's participation has ended.

=== Singles ===
Tournament	2008	2009	2010	2011	2012	2013	2014	2015	2016	2017	2018	2019	2020	2021	2022	2023	2024	2025	SR	W–L	Win%
Grand Slam tournaments
Australian Open	A	A	A	A	Q2	A	3R (Note: Pospisil's 2014 Australian Open withdrawal in the third round does not count as a loss.)	3R	1R	Q1	1R	A	1R	1R	A	1R	A	A	0 / 6	4–6	40%
French Open	A	A	A	A	1R	1R	1R	1R	1R	A	1R	A	1R	A	A	A	A	A	0 / 7	0–7	0%
Wimbledon	A	A	A	Q2	1R	2R	1R	QF	1R	1R	1R	1R	NH	2R	Q1	Q1	A	A	0 / 9	6–9	40%
US Open	A	A	A	2R	Q1	1R	1R	1R	2R	1R	2R	2R	4R	2R	Q2	Q2	A	A	0 / 10	8–10	44%
Win–loss	0–0	0–0	0–0	1–1	0–2	1–3	2–3	6–4	1–4	0–2	1–4	1–2	3–3	2–3	0–0	0–1	0–0	0–0	0 / 32	18–32	36%
National representation
Summer Olympics	A	NH			1R	NH			1R	NH				A	NH		A	NH	0 / 2	0–2	0%
Davis Cup	AZ1	A	A	PO	1R	SF	PO	1R	1R	1R	1R	F	RR		W	QF	QF	Q1	1 / 11	15–14	52%
ATP Masters 1000
Indian Wells Open	A	A	A	A	1R	1R	2R	2R	2R	3R	1R	A	NH	2R	Q2	A	A	A	0 / 8	5–8	36%
Miami Open	A	A	A	A	A	A	2R	2R	2R	A	3R	A	NH	1R	Q1	A	A	A	0 / 5	4–5	44%
Monte-Carlo Masters	A	A	A	A	A	A	1R	A	A	A	A	A	NH	A	A	A	A	A	0 / 1	0–1	0%
Madrid Open	A	A	A	A	Q1	A	A	Q1	1R	A	A	A	NH	A	A	A	A	A	0 / 1	0–1	0%
Italian Open	A	A	A	A	Q1	Q2	1R	A	1R	A	A	A	A	A	A	A	A	A	0 / 2	0–2	0%
Canadian Open	Q1	Q1	Q1	2R	2R	SF	1R	2R	2R	1R	1R	1R	NH	1R	1R	1R	1R	1R	0 / 14	8–14	36%
Cincinnati Open	A	A	A	A	Q1	2R	2R	2R	1R	Q1	A	A	A	Q1	A	A	A	A	0 / 4	3–4	43%
Shanghai Masters	NH	A	A	A	A	2R	2R	2R	3R	Q2	1R	3R	NH			A	A	A	0 / 6	7–6	54%
Paris Masters	A	A	A	A	A	1R	1R	A	Q1	1R	Q2	A	Q2	A	A	A	A	A	0 / 3	0–3	0%
Win–loss	0–0	0–0	0–0	1–1	1–2	6–5	2–8	5–5	5–7	2–3	2–3	2–2	0–0	1–3	0–1	0–1	0–1	0–1	0 / 44	27–44	38%
Career statistics
	2008	2009	2010	2011	2012	2013	2014	2015	2016	2017	2018	2019	2020	2021	2022	2023	2024	2025	Career		
Tournaments	0	0	0	4	13	15	24	22	22	13	14	5	10	14	3	2	1	1	Career total: 163		
Titles	0	0	0	0	0	0	0	0	0	0	0	0	0	0	0	0	0	0	Career total: 0		
Finals	0	0	0	0	0	0	1	0	0	0	0	0	2	0	0	0	0	0	Career total: 3		
Hardcourt win–loss	0–0	0–0	0–0	5–4	5–9	15–13	17–16	20–18	9–14	5–9	6–10	6–5	16–9	5–12	5–4	1–2	1–1	0–1	0 / 120	116–127	48%
Clay win–loss	0–0	0–0	0–0	1–1	0–1	0–3	0–4	0–2	0–5	0–0	0–2	0–0	0–1	0–0	0–0	0–0	0–0	0–0	0 / 14	1–19	5%
Grass win–loss	0–0	0–0	0–0	0–0	0–5	2–2	3–3	5–3	1–4	3–4	2–3	0–1	0–0	3–4	0–0	0–0	0–0	0–0	0 / 29	19–29	40%
Carpet win–loss	0–1	discontinued																	0 / 0	0–1	0%
Overall win–loss	0–1	0–0	0–0	6–5	5–15	17–18	20–23	25–23	10–23	8–13	8–15	6–6	16–10	8–16	5–4	1–2	1–1	0–1	0 / 163	136–176	44%
Win %	0%	–	–	55%	25%	49%	47%	52%	30%	38%	35%	50%	62%	33%	56%	33%	50%	0%	Career total: 44%		
Year-end ranking	1087	339	339	119	125	32	53	39	133	108	70	149	61	133	98	437	733	–	$7,202,229		

=== Doubles ===
Tournament	2008	2009	2010	2011	2012	2013	2014	2015	2016	2017	2018	2019	2020	2021	2022	2023	2024	2025	SR	W–L	Win%
Grand Slam tournaments
Australian Open	A	A	A	A	A	A	1R	2R	QF	1R	1R	A	1R	2R	A	A	A	A	0 / 7	4–7	36%
French Open	A	A	A	A	A	A	1R	QF	2R	A	1R	A	2R	A	A	A	A	A	0 / 5	5–5	50%
Wimbledon	A	A	A	A	A	3R	W	3R	3R	2R	1R	2R	NH	1R	A	A	A	A	1 / 8	14–7	72%
US Open	A	A	A	A	A	3R	3R	1R	1R	A	A	1R	A	2R	A	A	A	A	0 / 6	5–6	45%
Win–loss	0–0	0–0	0–0	0–0	0–0	4–2	8–3	6–4	5–4	1–2	0–3	1–2	1–2	2–3	0–0	0–0	0–0	0–0	1 / 26	28–25	54%
National representation
Summer Olympics	A	NH			2R	NH			4th	NH				A	NH		A	NH	0 / 2	4–3	57%
Davis Cup	AZ1	A	A	PO	1R	SF	PO	1R	1R	1R	1R	F	RR		W	QF	QF	Q1	1 / 11	18–13	58%
ATP Masters 1000
Indian Wells Open	A	A	A	A	A	A	1R	W	F	2R	A	A	NH	A	A	A	A	A	1 / 4	10–3	77%
Miami Open	A	A	A	A	A	A	1R	F	1R	A	A	A	NH	A	A	A	A	A	0 / 3	4–3	57%
Monte-Carlo Masters	A	A	A	A	A	A	1R	A	A	A	A	A	NH	A	A	A	A	A	0 / 1	0–1	0%
Madrid Open	A	A	A	A	A	A	A	QF	QF	A	A	A	NH	A	A	A	A	A	0 / 2	2–2	50%
Italian Open	A	A	A	A	A	A	1R	A	F	A	A	A	A	A	A	A	A	A	0 / 2	3–2	60%
Canadian Open	A	A	2R	1R	1R	A	1R	A	SF	1R	1R	1R	NH	A	1R	2R	1R	A	0 / 11	4–10	29%
Cincinnati Open	A	A	A	A	A	A	F	2R	SF	A	A	A	A	A	A	A	A	A	0 / 3	6–3	67%
Shanghai Masters	NH	A	A	A	A	QF	2R	1R	2R	A	A	A	NH			A	A	A	0 / 4	2–4	33%
Paris Masters	A	A	A	A	A	A	2R	F	SF	A	A	A	A	A	A	A	A	A	0 / 3	6–3	67%
Win–loss	0–0	0–0	1–1	0–1	0–1	2–1	4–7	14–5	14–8	1–2	0–1	0–1	0–0	0–0	0–1	1–1	0–1	0–0	1 / 33	37–31	54%
Career statistics
	2008	2009	2010	2011	2012	2013	2014	2015	2016	2017	2018	2019	2020	2021	2022	2023	2024	2025	Career		
Tournaments	0	0	1	1	5	5	19	16	17	6	4	3	3	6	1	2	1	0	Career total: 90		
Titles	0	0	0	0	0	0	3	2	1	0	0	0	1	0	0	0	0	0	Career total: 7		
Finals	0	0	0	0	0	0	5	4	3	1	0	0	1	1	0	0	0	0	Career total: 15		
Hardcourt win–loss	0–0	0–0	1–1	1–1	1–4	6–5	18–10	19–10	20–12	5–6	0–3	2–3	4–1	2–5	4–2	4–3	0–3	1–0	6 / 63	86–68	56%
Clay win–loss	0–0	0–0	0–0	2–0	0–0	1–0	1–3	4–2	5–4	0–0	0–2	0–0	1–1	2–1	0–0	0–0	0–0	0–0	0 / 12	16–13	54%
Grass win–loss	0–0	0–0	0–0	0–0	1–2	2–1	7–2	2–2	2–2	1–1	0–1	1–1	0–0	2–2	0–0	0–0	0–0	0–0	1 / 15	18–14	58%
Overall win–loss	0–0	0–0	1–1	3–1	2–6	9–6	26–15	25–14	27–18	6–7	0–6	3–4	5–2	6–8	4–2	4–3	0–3	1–0	7 / 90	120–95	56%
Win %	–	–	50%	75%	25%	60%	63%	64%	60%	46%	0%	43%	71%	46%	67%	57%	0%	100%	Career total: 56%		
Year-end ranking	437	234	153	150	305	88	14	21	20	179	637	446	192	156	–	576	1393	–			

== Grand Slam finals ==
=== Doubles: 1 (1 title) ===
Result	Year	Championship	Surface	Partner	Opponents	Score
Win	2014	Wimbledon	Grass	(United States) Jack Sock	(United States) Bob Bryan (United States) Mike Bryan	7–6^{(7–5)}, 6–7^{(3–7)}, 6–4, 3–6, 7–5

== Other significant finals ==
=== Masters 1000 finals ===
==== Doubles: 6 (1 title, 5 runners-up) ====
Result	Year	Tournament	Surface	Partner	Opponents	Score
Loss	2014	Cincinnati Masters	Hard	(United States) Jack Sock	(United States) Bob Bryan (United States) Mike Bryan	3–6, 2–6
Win	2015	Indian Wells Masters	Hard	(United States) Jack Sock	(Italy) Simone Bolelli (Italy) Fabio Fognini	6–4, 6–7^{(3–7)}, [10–7]
Loss	2015	Miami Masters	Hard	(United States) Jack Sock	(United States) Bob Bryan (United States) Mike Bryan	3–6, 6–1, [8–10]
Loss	2015	Paris Masters	Hard (i)	(United States) Jack Sock	(Croatia) Ivan Dodig (Brazil) Marcelo Melo	6–2, 3–6, [5–10]
Loss	2016	Indian Wells Masters	Hard	(United States) Jack Sock	(France) Pierre-Hugues Herbert (France) Nicolas Mahut	3–6, 6–7^{(5–7)}
Loss	2016	Italian Open	Clay	(United States) Jack Sock	(United States) Bob Bryan (United States) Mike Bryan	6–2, 3–6, [7–10]

=== Olympic medal matches ===
==== Doubles: 1 (4th place) ====
Outcome	Year	Tournament	Surface	Partner	Opponents	Score
4th place	2016	Rio de Janeiro Olympics	Hard	(Canada) Daniel Nestor	(United States) Steve Johnson (United States) Jack Sock	2–6, 4–6

== ATP career finals ==
=== Singles: 3 (3 runner-ups) ===
Legend Grand Slam ATP Finals ATP Masters 1000 ATP 500 Series (0–1) ATP 250 Series (0–2)	Finals by surface Hard (0–3) Clay Grass Carpet	Finals by setting Outdoor (0–1) Indoor (0–2)

Result	W–L	Date	Tournament	Tier	Surface	Opponent	Score
Loss	0–1	Aug 2014	Washington Open, US	500 Series	Hard	(Canada) Milos Raonic	1–6, 4–6
Loss	0–2	Feb 2020	Open Sud de France, France	250 Series	Hard (i)	(France) Gaël Monfils	5–7, 3–6
Loss	0–3	Nov 2020	Sofia Open, Bulgaria	250 Series	Hard (i)	(Italy) Jannik Sinner	4–6, 6–3, 6–7^{(3–7)}

=== Doubles: 15 (7 titles, 8 runner-ups) ===
Legend Grand Slam (1–0) ATP Finals ATP Masters 1000 (1–5) ATP 500 Series (3–1) ATP 250 Series (2–2)	Finals by surface Hard (6–6) Clay (0–1) Grass (1–1)	Finals by setting Outdoor (4–7) Indoor (3–1)

Result	W–L	Date	Tournament	Tier	Surface	Partner	Opponents	Score
Win	1–0	Jul 2014	Wimbledon, London, UK	Grand Slam	Grass	(United States) Jack Sock	(United States) Bob Bryan (United States) Mike Bryan	7–6^{(7–5)}, 6–7^{(3–7)}, 6–4, 3–6, 7–5
Win	2–0	Jul 2014	Atlanta Open, US	250 Series	Hard	(United States) Jack Sock	(United States) Steve Johnson (United States) Sam Querrey	6–3, 5–7, [10–5]
Loss	2–1	Aug 2014	Cincinnati Masters, US	Masters 1000	Hard	(United States) Jack Sock	(United States) Bob Bryan (United States) Mike Bryan	3–6, 2–6
Loss	2–2	Oct 2014	China Open, China	500 Series	Hard	(France) Julien Benneteau	(Netherlands) Jean-Julien Rojer (Romania) Horia Tecău	7–6^{(8–6)}, 5–7, [5–10]
Win	3–2	Oct 2014	Swiss Indoors, Switzerland	500 Series	Hard (i)	(Serbia) Nenad Zimonjić	(Croatia) Marin Draganja (Finland) Henri Kontinen	7–6^{(15–13)}, 1–6, [10–5]
Win	4–2	Mar 2015	Indian Wells Masters, US	Masters 1000	Hard	(United States) Jack Sock	(Italy) Simone Bolelli (Italy) Fabio Fognini	6–4, 6–7^{(3–7)}, [10–7]
Loss	4–3	Apr 2015	Miami Open, US	Masters 1000	Hard	(United States) Jack Sock	(United States) Bob Bryan (United States) Mike Bryan	3–6, 6–1, [8–10]
Win	5–3	Oct 2015	China Open, China	500 Series	Hard	(United States) Jack Sock	(Canada) Daniel Nestor (France) Édouard Roger-Vasselin	3–6, 6–3, [10–6]
Loss	5–4	Nov 2015	Paris Masters, France	Masters 1000	Hard (i)	(United States) Jack Sock	(Croatia) Ivan Dodig (Brazil) Marcelo Melo	6–2, 3–6, [5–10]
Win	6–4	Feb 2016	Rotterdam Open, Netherlands	500 Series	Hard (i)	(France) Nicolas Mahut	(Germany) Philipp Petzschner (Austria) Alexander Peya	7–6^{(7–2)}, 6–4
Loss	6–5	Mar 2016	Indian Wells Masters, US	Masters 1000	Hard	(United States) Jack Sock	(France) Pierre-Hugues Herbert (France) Nicolas Mahut	3–6, 6–7^{(5–7)}
Loss	6–6	May 2016	Italian Open, Italy	Masters 1000	Clay	(United States) Jack Sock	(United States) Bob Bryan (United States) Mike Bryan	6–2, 3–6, [7–10]
Loss	6–7	Jan 2017	Qatar Open, Qatar	250 Series	Hard	(Czech Republic) Radek Štěpánek	(France) Jérémy Chardy (France) Fabrice Martin	4–6, 6–7^{(3–7)}
Win	7–7	Feb 2020	Open 13, France	250 Series	Hard (i)	(France) Nicolas Mahut	(Netherlands) Wesley Koolhof (Croatia) Nikola Mektić	6–3, 6–4
Loss	7–8	Jul 2021	Hall of Fame Open, US	250 Series	Grass	(United States) Austin Krajicek	(United States) William Blumberg (United States) Jack Sock	2–6, 6–7^{(3–7)}

== Other finals ==
=== Team competitions: 2 (1 win, 1 runner-up) ===
Result	Date	Tournament	Surface	Partners	Opponent	Score
Loss	Nov 2019	Davis Cup, Madrid	Hard (i)	(Canada) Félix Auger-Aliassime (Canada) Denis Shapovalov (Canada) Brayden Schnur	(Spain) Rafael Nadal (Spain) Roberto Bautista Agut (Spain) Feliciano López (Spain) Pablo Carreño Busta (Spain) Marcel Granollers	0–2
Win	Nov 2022	Davis Cup, Málaga	Hard (i)	(Canada) Félix Auger-Aliassime (Canada) Denis Shapovalov (Canada) Alexis Galarneau (Canada) Gabriel Diallo	(Australia) Alex de Minaur (Australia) Jordan Thompson (Australia) Thanasi Kokkinakis (Australia) Matthew Ebden	2–0

== ATP Challenger and ITF Futures finals ==
=== Singles: 30 (21 titles, 9 runner-ups) ===
Legend ATP Challenger (11–7) ITF Futures (10–2)	Finals by surface Hard (20–8) Clay (1–1) Grass (0–0) Carpet (0–0)

Result	W–L	Date	Tournament	Tier	Surface	Opponent	Score
Loss	0–1	Jul 2009	USA F17, Peoria	Futures	Clay	(United States) Michael Venus	7–6^{(4)}, 4–6, 4–6
Win	1–1	Sep 2009	Italy F29, Alghero	Futures	Hard	(Italy) Francesco Piccari	6–3, 6–7^{(5)}, 6–3
Win	2–1	Oct 2009	Italy F30, Quartu Sant'Elena	Futures	Hard	(Italy) Matteo Viola	6–1, 6–2
Win	3–1	Nov 2009	Mexico F12, Ciudad Obregón	Futures	Hard	(Mexico) Daniel Garza	7–6^{(0)}, 6–3
Win	4–1	Nov 2009	Mexico F14, Guadalajara	Futures	Clay	(Mexico) César Ramírez	6–2, 6–2
Loss	4–2	Feb 2010	USA F5, Brownsville	Futures	Hard	(Dominican Republic) Víctor Estrella Burgos	4–6, 3–6
Win	5–2	Mar 2010	Canada F3, Sherbrooke	Futures	Hard (i)	(Canada) Milos Raonic	6–4, 4–6, 6–3
Win	6–2	Sep 2010	Mexico F6, León	Futures	Hard	(United Kingdom) David Rice	6–1, 6–2
Win	7–2	Sep 2010	Mexico F7, Guadalajara	Futures	Hard	(United States) Adam El Mihdawy	6–0, 6–1
Win	8–2	Oct 2010	Canada F5, Markham	Futures	Hard (i)	(United States) Nicholas Monroe	6–3, 6–2
Win	9–2	May 2011	Korea F2, Changwon	Futures	Hard	(South Korea) Lim Yong-Kyu	7–5, 6–4
Win	10–2	Jul 2011	Canada F4, Saskatoon	Futures	Hard	(Canada) Érik Chvojka	7–5, 6–2
Win	11–2	Mar 2012	Rimouski, Canada	Challenger	Hard (i)	(Belgium) Maxime Authom	7–6^{(6)}, 6–4
Win	12–2	Jul 2012	Granby, Canada	Challenger	Hard	(Netherlands) Igor Sijsling	7–6^{(2)}, 6–4
Loss	12–3	Mar 2013	Rimouski, Canada	Challenger	Hard (i)	(South Africa) Rik de Voest	6–7^{(6)}, 4–6
Win	13–3	May 2013	Johannesburg, South Africa	Challenger	Hard	(Poland) Michał Przysiężny	6–7^{(7)}, 6–0, 4–1 ret.
Win	14–3	Aug 2013	Vancouver, Canada	Challenger	Hard	(United Kingdom) Daniel Evans	6–0, 1–6, 7–5
Loss	14–4	Feb 2017	San Francisco, United States	Challenger	Hard (i)	(China) Zhang Ze	5–7, 6–3, 2–6
Win	15–4	May 2017	Busan, South Korea	Challenger	Hard	(Japan) Go Soeda	6–1, 6–2
Win	16–4	Jan 2018	Rennes, France	Challenger	Hard (i)	(Lithuania) Ričardas Berankis	6–1, 6–2
Win	17–4	Feb 2018	Budapest, Hungary	Challenger	Hard (i)	(Spain) Nicola Kuhn	7–6^{(3)}, 3–6, 6–3
Loss	17–5	May 2018	Gimcheon, South Korea	Challenger	Hard	(Japan) Yoshihito Nishioka	4–6, 5–7
Loss	17–6	May 2018	Busan, South Korea	Challenger	Hard	(Australia) Matthew Ebden	6–7^{(4)}, 1–6
Win	18–6	Oct 2019	Las Vegas, United States	Challenger	Hard	(Australia) James Duckworth	7–5, 6–7^{(11)}, 6–3
Win	19–6	Nov 2019	Charlottesville, United States	Challenger	Hard	(Canada) Brayden Schnur	7–6^{(2)}, 3–6, 6–2
Win	20–6	Jan 2022	Quimper, France	Challenger	Hard (i)	(France) Grégoire Barrère	6–4, 3–6, 6–1
Loss	20–7	Feb 2022	Pau, France	Challenger	Hard (i)	(France) Quentin Halys	6–4, 4–6, 3–6
Loss	20–8	Oct 2022	Mouilleron-le-Captif, France	Challenger	Hard (i)	(Netherlands) Jelle Sels	4–6, 3–6
Win	21–8	Nov 2022	Drummondville, Canada	Challenger	Hard (i)	(United States) Michael Mmoh	7–6^{(7–5)}, 4–6, 6–4
Loss	21–9	Feb 2023	Koblenz, Germany	Challenger	Hard (i)	(Russia) Roman Safiullin	2–6, 5–7

=== Doubles: 31 (17 titles, 14 runner–ups) ===
Legend ATP Challenger (7–3) ITF Futures (10–11)	Finals by surface Hard (15–7) Clay (2–7) Grass (0–0) Carpet (0–0)

Result	W–L	Date	Tournament	Tier	Surface	Partner	Opponents	Score
Win	1–0	Mar 2007	Canada F3, Rock Forest	Futures	Hard (i)	(Canada) Érik Chvojka	(Austria) Christoph Palmanshofer (United States) Jason Zimmermann	7–5, 6–3
Loss	1–1	May 2008	Czech Republic F1, Teplice	Futures	Clay	(Canada) Érik Chvojka	(Czech Republic) Roman Jebavý (Czech Republic) Filip Zeman	4–6, 7–6^{(6)}, [8–10]
Loss	1–2	Aug 2008	Serbia F6, Čačak	Futures	Clay	(Czech Republic) Jiří Krkoška	(Serbia) Aleksander Slović (Montenegro) Goran Tošić	2–6, 4–6
Loss	1–3	Sep 2008	Italy F29, Torre del Greco	Futures	Clay	(Italy) Davide Della Tommasina	(Italy) Alessandro Accardo (Italy) Matteo Volante	7–6^{(1)}, 4–6, [6–10]
Win	2–3	Oct 2008	Germany F22, Leimen	Futures	Hard (i)	(Czech Republic) Michal Navrátil	(Germany) Nils Langer (Germany) Frank Wintermantel	6–3, 6–4
Win	3–3	Nov 2008	Rimouski, Canada	Challenger	Hard (i)	(Canada) Milos Raonic	(Denmark) Kristian Pless (Sweden) Michael Ryderstedt	5–7, 6–4, [10–6]
Win	4–3	Nov 2008	Nicaragua F1, Managua	Futures	Hard	(Czech Republic) Jiří Krkoška	(Romania) Alexandru Cojanu (Latvia) Deniss Pavlovs	7–6^{(1)}, 6–3
Loss	4–4	Nov 2008	El Salvador F2, La Libertad	Futures	Clay	(Czech Republic) Jiří Krkoška	(Colombia) Michael Quintero (Colombia) Carlos Salamanca	7–6^{(8)}, 4–6, [12–14]
Loss	4–5	Apr 2009	USA F8, Little Rock	Futures	Hard	(United States) Ryan Young	(Australia) Kaden Hensel (Australia) Adam Hubble	1–6, 3–6
Win	5–5	May 2009	Mexico F4, Coatzacoalcos	Futures	Hard	(Canada) Adil Shamasdin	(Australia) Kaden Hensel (Australia) Adam Hubble	6–3, 6–4
Win	6–5	May 2009	Mexico F5, Puerto Vallarta	Futures	Hard	(Canada) Adil Shamasdin	(Mexico) Juan Manuel Elizondo (Mexico) César Ramírez	6–1, 2–6, [10–7]
Win	7–5	Jul 2009	USA F17, Peoria	Futures	Clay	(Canada) Milos Raonic	(Australia) Matt Reid (United States) Denis Zivkovic	6–3, 6–4
Win	8–5	Aug 2009	Romania F14, Arad	Futures	Clay	(Romania) Marius Copil	(Romania) Andrei Mlendea (Czech Republic) Jiří Školoudík	6–3, 6–4
Loss	8–6	Aug 2009	Romania F15, Brașov	Futures	Clay	(Romania) Marius Copil	(Spain) Carlos Calderón Rodríguez (Spain) Gerard Granollers Pujol	5–7, 7–6^{(2)}, [10–12]
Win	9–6	Sep 2009	Italy F28, Porto Torres	Futures	Hard	(United Kingdom) Marcus Willis	(Italy) Alessandro Giannessi (Italy) Francesco Piccari	4–6, 6–3, [10–8]
Loss	9–7	Sep 2009	Italy F29, Alghero	Futures	Hard	(United Kingdom) Marcus Willis	(Italy) Federico Gaio (Italy) Alessandro Giannessi	2–6, 5–7
Win	10–7	Oct 2009	Mexico F12, Ciudad Obregón	Futures	Hard	(Australia) Nima Roshan	(Switzerland) Adrien Bossel (Belgium) Julien Dubail	6–7, 6–3, [11–9]
Loss	10–8	Nov 2009	Mexico F14, Guadalajara	Futures	Clay	(United States) Ashwin Kumar	(Mexico) Bruno Echagaray (Mexico) Miguel Gallardo Valles	6–3, 2–6, [6–10]
Win	11–8	Nov 2009	Puebla, Mexico	Challenger	Hard	(Canada) Adil Shamasdin	(Spain) Guillermo Olaso (Spain) Pere Riba	7–6^{(0)}, 6–0
Loss	11–9	Feb 2010	Dallas, USA	Challenger	Hard (i)	(Canada) Adil Shamasdin	(United States) Scott Lipsky (United States) David Martin	6–7^{(7)}, 3–6
Loss	11–10	Mar 2010	Canada F3, Sherbrooke	Futures	Hard (i)	(Canada) Milos Raonic	(United States) Cory Parr (United States) Todd Paul	4–6, 4–6
Win	12–10	Apr 2010	León, Mexico	Challenger	Hard	(Mexico) Santiago González	(Australia) Kaden Hensel (Australia) Adam Hubble	3–6, 6–3, [10–8]
Loss	12–11	Jul 2010	USA F17, Pittsburgh	Futures	Clay	(Italy) Gregory Ouellette	(United States) Tennys Sandgren (United States) Rhyne Williams	6–3, 3–6, [9–11]
Loss	12–12	Sep 2010	USA F17, León	Futures	Hard	(Australia) Nima Roshan	(Mexico) Juan Manuel Elizondo (Mexico) César Ramírez	3–6, 6–4, [6–10]
Loss	12–13	Oct 2010	Seoul, South Korea	Challenger	Hard	(Canada) Adil Shamasdin	(Australia) Rameez Junaid (Germany) Frank Moser	3–6, 4–6
Win	13–13	Mar 2011	Rimouski, Canada	Challenger	Hard (i)	(Philippines) Treat Conrad Huey	(United Kingdom) David Rice (United Kingdom) Sean Thornley	6–0, 6–1
Win	14–13	Mar 2011	USA F8, Oklahoma City	Futures	Hard	(United States) Nicholas Monroe	(Australia) Carsten Ball (Australia) Chris Guccione	6–4, 6–3
Win	15–13	Apr 2011	Tallahassee, United States	Challenger	Hard	(United States) Bobby Reynolds	(Japan) Go Soeda (United Kingdom) James Ward	6–2, 6–4
Loss	15–14	May 2011	Busan, South Korea	Challenger	Hard	(United Kingdom) Jamie Baker	(South Korea) Im Kyu-tae (Thailand) Danai Udomchoke	4–6, 4–6
Win	16–14	Jun 2011	Guadalajara, Mexico	Challenger	Hard	(United States) Bobby Reynolds	(Canada) Pierre-Ludovic Duclos (Slovakia) Ivo Klec	6–4, 6–7^{(6)}, [10–6]
Win	17–14	Jul 2012	Granby, Canada	Challenger	Hard	(Canada) Philip Bester	(Japan) Yuichi Ito (Japan) Takuto Niki	6–1, 6–2

== Junior Grand Slam finals ==
=== Doubles: 2 (2 runners-up) ===
Result	Year	Tournament	Surface	Partner	Opponents	Score
Loss	2007	US Open	Hard	(Bulgaria) Grigor Dimitrov	(France) Jonathan Eysseric (France) Jérôme Inzerillo	2–6, 4–6
Loss	2008	Australian Open	Hard	(Mexico) César Ramírez	(Chinese Taipei) Hsieh Cheng-peng (Chinese Taipei) Yang Tsung-hua	6–3, 5–7, [5–10]

== Record against other players ==
=== Record against top 10 players ===
Pospisil's match record against players who have been ranked in the top 10, with those who are active in boldface. Only ATP Tour main draw matches are considered:

Player	Record	Win %	Hard	Clay	Grass	Last match
**Number 1 ranked players**						
(Australia) Lleyton Hewitt	1–1	50%	1–0	–	0–1	Won (7–6^{(8–6)}, 6–4) at 2013 Vienna
(Russia) **Daniil Medvedev**	1–3	25%	1–3	–	–	Lost (2–6, 2–6, 4–6) at 2021 Australian Open
(United Kingdom) Andy Murray	1–5	17%	1–4	–	0–1	Lost (3–6, 3–6) at 2021 Metz
(Italy) **Jannik Sinner**	0–1	0%	0–1	–	–	Lost (4–6, 6–3, 6–7^{(3–7)}) at 2020 Sofia
(Spain) Rafael Nadal	0–2	0%	0–2	–	–	Lost (3–6, 4–6, 2–6) at 2018 US Open
(Switzerland) Roger Federer	0–3	0%	0–3	–	–	Lost (6–7^{(4–7)}, 7–5, 2–6) at 2014 Cincinnati
(Serbia) **Novak Djokovic**	0–6	0%	0–4	0–1	0–1	Lost (6–7^{(5–7)}, 3–6) at 2022 Tel Aviv
Number 2 ranked players						
(Germany) **Alexander Zverev**	0–1	0%	0–1	–	–	Lost (5–7, 2–6) at 2016 Rotterdam
Number 3 ranked players						
(Russia) Nikolay Davydenko	1–0	100%	1–0	–	–	Won (3–0^{r}) at 2013 Montréal
(Argentina) Juan Martín del Potro	1–0	100%	1–0	–	–	Won (6–4, 7–6^{(9–7)}) at 2015 Miami
(Canada) **Milos Raonic**	2–2	50%	2–2	–	–	Won (6–7^{(1–7)}, 6–3, 7–6^{(7–4)}, 6–3) at 2020 US Open
(Bulgaria) **Grigor Dimitrov**	1–3	25%	1–3	–	–	Won (7–5, 7–6^{(7–2)}) at 2016 Shanghai
(Argentina) David Nalbandian	0–1	0%	–	–	0–1	Lost (6–4, 2–6, 2–6) at 2012 Queen's Club
(Greece) **Stefanos Tsitsipas**	0–1	0%	0–1	–	–	Lost (5–7, 3–6) at 2020 Marseille
(Switzerland) **Stan Wawrinka**	0–1	0%	0–1	–	–	Lost (4–6, 5–5^{r}) at 2014 Chennai
(Austria) Dominic Thiem	0–2	0%	–	0–1	0–1	Lost (4–6, 4–6, 3–6) at 2017 Wimbledon
(Croatia) **Marin Čilić**	0–3	0%	0–2	–	0–1	Lost (5–7, 6–7^{(4–7)}) at 2018 Miami
(Spain) David Ferrer	0–3	0%	0–2	–	0–1	Lost (4–6, 6–3, 6–7^{(2–7)}) at 2013 Beijing
Number 4 ranked players						
(Czech Republic) Tomáš Berdych	2–1	67%	2–0	0–1	–	Lost (3–6, 2–6, 1–6) at 2016 French Open
(Japan) **Kei Nishikori**	0–1	0%	0–1	–	–	Lost (4–6, 6–7^{(5–7)}, 3–6) at 2015 Davis Cup
Number 5 ranked players						
(Russia) **Andrey Rublev**	1–2	33%	1–2	–	–	Lost (2–6, 4–6) at 2020 St. Petersburg
(Canada) **Félix Auger-Aliassime**	1–4	20%	1–3	–	0–1	Lost (6–1, 6–7^{(4–7)}, 6–7^{(3–7)}, 3–6) at 2023 Australian Open
(Spain) Tommy Robredo	0–1	0%	0–1	–	–	Lost (3–6, 6–4, 6–7^{(5–7)}) at 2014 Paris
(France) Jo-Wilfried Tsonga	0–1	0%	0–1	–	–	Lost (1–6, 3–6, 3–6) at 2012 Davis Cup
(South Africa) Kevin Anderson	0–2	0%	0–1	0–1	–	Lost (6–7^{(3–7)}, 4–6, 4–6) at 2016 US Open
Number 6 ranked players						
(Poland) **Hubert Hurkacz**	1–0	100%	1–0	–	–	Won (6–3, 6–4) at 2020 Marseille
(France) Gilles Simon	1–3	25%	1–2	0–1	–	Lost (6–1, 0–6, 1–6) at 2016 Indian Wells
(Italy) **Matteo Berrettini**	0–1	0%	–	0–1	–	Lost (3–6, 1–6, 3–6) at 2020 French Open
(Australia) **Alex de Minaur**	0–4	0%	0–3	–	0–1	Lost (4–6, 4–6) at 2021 Eastbourne
(France) **Gaël Monfils**	0–6	0%	0–6	–	–	Lost (5–7, 3–6) at 2020 Montpellier
Number 7 ranked players						
(France) Richard Gasquet	4–2	67%	4–2	–	–	Won (6–7^{(6–8)}, 6–2, 6–0) at 2020 Sofia
(Belgium) **David Goffin**	1–1	50%	1–1	–	–	Won (6–3, 1–6, 7–5) at 2020 Montpellier
(Spain) Fernando Verdasco	0–2	0%	0–2	–	–	Lost (2–6, 0–0^{r}) at 2017 US Open
Number 8 ranked players						
(Argentina) Diego Schwartzman	2–0	100%	2–0	–	–	Won (7–6^{(7–2)}, 6–2) at 2019 Shanghai
(Russia) **Karen Khachanov**	1–0	100%	1–0	–	–	Won (4–6, 7–5, 7–5, 4–6, 6–3) at 2019 US Open
(Austria) Jürgen Melzer	1–0	100%	1–0	–	–	Won (6–4, 2–0^{r}) at 2012 Kuala Lumpur
(Czech Republic) Radek Štěpánek	2–1	67%	2–0	0–1	–	Lost (1–6, 7–6^{(7–4)}, 4–6) at 2016 Madrid
(United States) John Isner	2–5	29%	2–5	–	–	Lost (4–6, 4–6) at 2022 Dallas
(Cyprus) Marcos Baghdatis	1–4	20%	1–4	–	–	Lost (7–6^{(7–4)}, 6–7^{(5–7)}, 4–6) at 2017 Chengdu
(Serbia) Janko Tipsarević	0–1	0%	–	0–1	–	Lost (6–7^{(3–7)}, 2–6, 6–7^{(6–8)}) at 2013 Davis Cup
(United States) Jack Sock	0–2	0%	0–2	–	–	Lost (6–3, 6–7^{(7–9)}, 5–7) at 2017 Basel
(Russia) Mikhail Youzhny	0–2	0%	0–1	–	0–1	Lost (2–6, 7–6^{(7–3)}, 6–7^{(7–9)}, 6–3, 4–6) at 2013 Wimbledon
Number 9 ranked players						
(Italy) Fabio Fognini	3–0	100%	2–0	–	1–0	Won (2–6, 3–6, 6–1, 6–3, 7–6^{(7–4)}) at 2021 US Open
(Spain) **Roberto Bautista Agut**	1–4	20%	1–3	0–1	–	Lost (6–3, 3–6, 3–6) at 2022 Davis Cup
Number 10 ranked players						
(France) **Lucas Pouille**	1–0	100%	1–0	–	–	Won (6–3, 5–7, 6–4) at 2016 Dubai
(Canada) **Denis Shapovalov**	1–3	25%	1–3	–	–	Lost (0–3^{r}) at 2021 Indian Wells
(United States) **Frances Tiafoe**	0–1	0%	–	–	0–1	Lost (4–6, 4–6, 4–6) at 2021 Wimbledon
(Argentina) Juan Mónaco	0–3	0%	0–3	–	–	Lost (5–7, 6–2, 3–6) at 2014 Shenzhen
**Total**	**34–95**	**26%**	**33–75 (31%)**	**0–9 (0%)**	**1–11 (8%)**	*** Statistics correct as of 17 March 2023.**

=== Wins over top-10 opponents ===
Pospisil has a 7–35 record against players who were, at the time the match was played, ranked in the top 10.

Season	2013	2014	...	2017	2018	2019	2020	Total
Wins	2	1		1	0	1	2	**7**

No.	Opponent	Rank	Event	Surface	Round	Score	VPR
**2013**
1.	(Czech Republic) Tomáš Berdych	6	Rogers Cup, Canada	Hard	3R	7–5, 2–6, 7–6^{(7–5)}	71
2.	(France) Richard Gasquet	10	Shanghai Masters, China	Hard	1R	6–3, 6–4	43
**2014**
3.	(Czech Republic) Tomáš Berdych	5	Washington Open, United States	Hard	3R	6–2, 6–4	36
**2017**
4.	(United Kingdom) Andy Murray	1	Indian Wells, United States	Hard	2R	6–4, 7–6^{(7–5)}	129
**2019**
5.	(Russia) Karen Khachanov	9	US Open, United States	Hard	1R	4–6, 7–5, 7–5, 4–6, 6–3	216
**2020**
6.	(Belgium) David Goffin	10	Open Sud de France, France	Hard (i)	SF	6–3, 1–6, 7–5	132
7.	(Russia) Daniil Medvedev	5	Rotterdam Open, Netherlands	Hard (i)	1R	6–4, 6–3	104

== Coaches ==
Summary of junior and professional coaches
Coach	Period of coaching		Pospisil's rank		
Coach	Start	End	Start	Peak	End
Miloš Pospíšil (1/2)	1995	fall 2002	n/a	n/a	n/a
Vadim Korkh	fall 2002	September 2004	n/a	n/a	n/a
Miloš Pospíšil (2/2)	September 2004	December 2010	n/a	270	336–339
Frédéric Niemeyer	December 2010	October 2012	336–339	85	113
Frédéric Fontang	October 2012	August 2016	113	25	100
Mark Woodforde	October 2016	May 2017	136	111	111
Dirk Hordorff	November 2017	2019	109	70	207
Rainer Schüttler	November 2017	2018	109	70	70
Frank Dancevic	August 2019	October 2021	205	57	113
