= Jack Sock career statistics =

Career finals
Discipline	Type	Won	Lost	Total	WR ^{1}
Singles	Grand Slam tournaments	–	–	–	–
Singles	ATP Finals	–	–	–	–
Singles	ATP Masters 1000	1	–	1	1.00
Singles	Olympic Games	–	–	–	–
Singles	ATP Tour 500	–	–	–	–
Singles	ATP Tour 250	3	4	7	0.43
Singles	Total	4	4	8	0.50
Doubles	Grand Slam tournaments	3	–	3	1.00
Doubles	ATP Finals	1	–	1	1.00
Doubles	ATP Masters 1000	4	6	10	0.40
Doubles	Olympic Games	–	–	–	–
Doubles	ATP Tour 500	3	3	6	0.50
Doubles	ATP Tour 250	6	1	7	0.86
Doubles	Total	17	10	27	0.63
Total		21	14	35	0.60
^{1)} WR = Winning Rate

This is a list of main career statistics of American former professional tennis player Jack Sock. All statistics are according to the ATP World Tour and ITF website.

== Performance timelines ==
Key
W	F	SF	QF	#R	RR	Q#	P#	DNQ	A	Z#	PO	G	S	B	NMS	NTI	P	NH

(W) winner; (F) finalist; (SF) semifinalist; (QF) quarterfinalist; (#R) rounds 4, 3, 2, 1; (RR) round-robin stage; (Q#) qualification round; (P#) preliminary round; (DNQ) did not qualify; (A) absent; (Z#) Davis/Fed Cup Zonal Group (with number indication) or (PO) play-off; (G) gold, (S) silver or (B) bronze Olympic/Paralympic medal; (NMS) not a Masters tournament; (NTI) not a Tier I tournament; (P) postponed; (NH) not held; (SR) strike rate (events won / competed); (W–L) win–loss record.
To avoid confusion and double counting, these charts are updated at the conclusion of a tournament or when the player's participation has ended.

=== Singles ===
Tournament	2010	2011	2012	2013	2014	2015	2016	2017	2018	2019	2020	2021	2022	2023	SR	W–L	Win %
Grand Slam tournaments
Australian Open	A	A	A	Q1	2R	A	2R	3R	1R	1R	A	A	A	A	0 / 5	4–5	44%
French Open	A	A	A	2R	3R	4R	3R	1R	1R	A	2R	A	Q1	A	0 / 7	9–7	56%
Wimbledon	A	A	A	Q1	2R	1R	3R	2R	1R	A	NH	A	3R	A	0 / 6	6–6	50%
US Open	1R	2R	3R	3R	1R	2R	4R	1R	2R	1R	2R	3R	1R	A	0 / 13	13–13	50%
Win–loss	0–1	1–1	2–1	3–2	4–4	4–3	8–4	3–4	1–4	0–2	2–2	2–1	2–2	0–0	0 / 31	32–31	51%
Year-end championship
ATP Finals	did not qualify							SF	did not qualify						0 / 1	2–2	50%
National representation
Summer Olympics	not held		A	not held			1R	not held				A	not held		0 / 1	0–1	0%
Davis Cup	A	A	A	A	A	PO	QF	QF	SF	RR	RR		QF	A	0 / 6	4–3	57%
ATP Tour Masters 1000
Indian Wells Masters	A	A	1R	1R	1R	4R	3R	SF	3R	A	NH	1R	2R	2R	0 / 10	11–10	52%
Miami Open	Q1	1R	A	Q2	2R	3R	3R	QF	3R	A	NH	A	1R	A	0 / 7	8–7	53%
Monte-Carlo Masters	A	A	A	A	A	A	A	A	A	A	NH	A	A	A	0 / 0	0–0	–
Madrid Open	A	A	A	A	A	2R	3R	1R	1R	A	NH	A	A	A	0 / 4	3–4	43%
Italian Open	A	A	A	A	Q1	1R	2R	3R	2R	A	A	A	A	A	0 / 4	4–4	50%
Canadian Open	A	A	A	Q2	2R	3R	3R	2R	1R	A	NH	A	A	A	0 / 5	6–5	55%
Cincinnati Masters	A	A	Q1	1R	1R	2R	A	1R	1R	Q1	A	Q1	Q1	A	0 / 5	1–5	17%
Shanghai Masters	A	A	A	Q2	3R	2R	QF	1R	1R	A	not held			A	0 / 5	6–5	55%
Paris Masters	A	A	A	A	2R	1R	QF	W	QF	A	A	A	A	A	1 / 5	11–4	73%
Win–loss	0–0	0–1	0–1	0–2	5–6	10–8	13–7	15–7	5–8	0–0	0–0	0–1	1–2	1–1	1 / 45	50–44	53%
Career statistics
	2010	2011	2012	2013	2014	2015	2016	2017	2018	2019	2020	2021	2022	2023	Career		
Tournaments	1	2	7	13	20	19	19	22	21	4	4	5	10	4	151		
Titles	0	0	0	0	0	1	0	3	0	0	0	0	0	0	4		
Finals	0	0	0	0	0	2	3	3	0	0	0	0	0	0	8		
Overall win–loss	0–1	1–2	5–7	10–13	27–20	35–18	37–21	38–22	9–22	1–4	3–4	6–5	7–11	2–4	181–154		
Win %	0%	33%	42%	43%	57%	66%	64%	63%	29%	20%	43%	55%	39%	33%	54%		
Year-end ranking	878	381	150	102	42	26	23	8	106	–	253	147	131	671			

=== Doubles ===
Tournament	2010	2011	2012	2013	2014	2015	2016	2017	2018	2019	2020	2021	2022	2023	SR	W–L	Win %
Grand Slam tournaments
Australian Open	A	A	A	A	A	A	QF	A	A	3R	A	A	A	A	0 / 2	4–2	67%
French Open	A	A	A	2R	3R	QF	2R	A	3R	A	2R	A	A	A	0 / 6	10–6	63%
Wimbledon	A	A	A	A	W	3R	3R	A	W	A	NH	A	QF	1R	2 / 6	19–4	83%
US Open	A	1R	2R	1R	3R	1R	A	A	W	QF	2R	2R	A	1R	1 / 10	14–8	64%
Win–loss	0–0	0–1	1–1	1–2	10–2	5–3	5–3	0–0	14–1	5–2	2–2	1–0	3–1	0–2	3 / 24	47–20	70%
Year-end championship
ATP Finals	did not qualify								W	did not qualify					1 / 1	4–1	80%
National representation
Summer Olympics	not held		A	not held			SF-B	not held				A	not held		0 / 1	4–1	80%
Davis Cup	A	A	A	A	A	PO	QF	QF	SF	RR	RR		QF	A	0 / 6	8–3	73%
ATP Tour Masters 1000
Indian Wells Masters	A	A	A	A	A	W	F	1R	W	A	NH	2R	W	SF	3 / 7	22–3	88%
Miami Open	A	1R	A	A	SF	F	1R	F	1R	A	NH	A	A	A	0 / 6	11–6	65%
Monte-Carlo Masters	A	A	A	A	A	A	A	A	A	A	NH	A	A	A	0 / 0	0–0	–
Madrid Open	A	A	A	A	A	QF	QF	SF	1R	A	NH	A	A	A	0 / 4	5–3	63%
Italian Open	A	A	A	A	A	SF	F	QF	2R	A	A	A	A	A	0 / 4	9–4	69%
Canadian Open	A	A	A	A	1R	1R	2R	1R	QF	A	NH	A	A	A	0 / 5	2–4	33%
Cincinnati Masters	A	A	A	A	F	2R	A	1R	2R	2R	1R	A	A	A	0 / 6	5–6	45%
Shanghai Masters	A	A	A	A	2R	1R	W	1R	2R	A	not held			A	1 / 5	5–3	63%
Paris Masters	A	A	A	A	2R	F	QF	2R	SF	A	A	A	A	A	0 / 5	9–5	64%
Win–loss	0–0	0–1	0–0	0–0	7–4	17–7	16–6	10–6	8–7	1–1	0–1	1–0	5–0	3–1	4 / 42	68–34	67%
Career statistics
	2010	2011	2012	2013	2014	2015	2016	2017	2018	2019	2020	2021	2022	2023	Career		
Tournaments	0	3	4	7	14	16	15	13	21	5	4	5	6	3	116		
Titles	0	0	0	1	2	3	2	0	6	0	0	1	2	0	17		
Finals	0	0	0	2	4	5	5	2	6	0	0	1	2	0	27		
Overall win–loss	0–0	0–3	2–4	10–6	25–11	30–13	33–13	21–12	42–16	11–6	4–4	8–3	21–7	3–3	210–101		
Win %	–	0%	33%	63%	69%	70%	72%	64%	72%	65%	50%	80%	75%	50%	68%		
Year-end ranking	687	370	168	101	15	19	16	39	2	119	134	150	43	190			

=== Mixed doubles ===
Tournament	2010	2011	2012	2013	2014	2015	2016	2017	2018	2019	2020	2021	2022	2023	SR	W–L	Win %
Grand Slam tournaments
Australian Open	A	A	A	1R	A	A	A	A	A	A	A	A	A	A	0 / 1	0–1	0%
French Open	A	A	A	A	A	A	A	A	A	A	NH	A	A	A	0 / 0	0–0	–
Wimbledon	A	A	A	A	A	A	A	2R	3R	A	NH	A	SF	A	0 / 3	6–3	67%
US Open	1R	W	2R	1R	A	A	A	A	A	A	NH	A	QF	1R	1 / 6	7–5	58%
Win–loss	0–1	4–0	1–1	0–2	0–0	0–0	0–0	1–1	2–1	0–0	0–0	0–0	5–2	0–1	1 / 10	13–9	59%
National representation
Summer Olympics	not held		A	not held			G	not held				A	not held		1 / 1	4–0	100%

== Significant finals ==
=== Grand Slams ===
==== Doubles: 3 (3 titles) ====
Result	Year	Championship	Surface	Partner	Opponents	Score
Win	2014	Wimbledon	Grass	(Canada) Vasek Pospisil	(United States) Bob Bryan (United States) Mike Bryan	7–6^{(7–5)}, 6–7^{(3–7)}, 6–4, 3–6, 7–5
Win	2018	Wimbledon (2)	Grass	(United States) Mike Bryan	(South Africa) Raven Klaasen (New Zealand) Michael Venus	6–3, 6–7^{(7–9)}, 6–3, 5–7, 7–5
Win	2018	US Open	Hard	(United States) Mike Bryan	(Poland) Łukasz Kubot (Brazil) Marcelo Melo	6–3, 6–1

==== Mixed doubles: 1 (1 title) ====
Result	Year	Championship	Surface	Partner	Opponents	Score
Win	2011	US Open	Hard	(United States) Melanie Oudin	(Argentina) Gisela Dulko (Argentina) Eduardo Schwank	7–6^{(7–4)}, 4–6, [10–8]

=== Year-end championships ===
==== Doubles: 1 (1 title) ====
Result	Year	Championship	Surface	Partner	Opponents	Score
Win	2018	ATP Finals, London	Hard (i)	(United States) Mike Bryan	(France) Pierre-Hugues Herbert (France) Nicolas Mahut	5–7, 6–1, [13–11]

=== Masters tournaments ===
==== Singles: 1 (1 title) ====
Result	Year	Tournament	Surface	Opponent	Score
Win	2017	Paris Masters	Hard (i)	(Serbia) Filip Krajinović	5–7, 6–4, 6–1

==== Doubles: 10 (4 titles, 6 runner-ups) ====
Result	Year	Tournament	Surface	Partner	Opponents	Score
Loss	2014	Cincinnati Masters	Hard	(Canada) Vasek Pospisil	(United States) Bob Bryan (United States) Mike Bryan	3–6, 2–6
Win	2015	Indian Wells Masters	Hard	(Canada) Vasek Pospisil	(Italy) Simone Bolelli (Italy) Fabio Fognini	6–4, 6–7^{(3–7)}, [10–7]
Loss	2015	Miami Masters	Hard	(Canada) Vasek Pospisil	(United States) Bob Bryan (United States) Mike Bryan	3–6, 6–1, [8–10]
Loss	2015	Paris Masters	Hard (i)	(Canada) Vasek Pospisil	(Croatia) Ivan Dodig (Brazil) Marcelo Melo	6–2, 3–6, [5–10]
Loss	2016	Indian Wells Masters	Hard	(Canada) Vasek Pospisil	(France) Pierre-Hugues Herbert (France) Nicolas Mahut	3–6, 6–7^{(5–7)}
Loss	2016	Rome Masters	Clay	(Canada) Vasek Pospisil	(United States) Bob Bryan (United States) Mike Bryan	6–2, 3–6, [7–10]
Win	2016	Shanghai Masters	Hard	(United States) John Isner	(Finland) Henri Kontinen (Australia) John Peers	6–4, 6–4
Loss	2017	Miami Masters	Hard	(United States) Nicholas Monroe	(Poland) Łukasz Kubot (Brazil) Marcelo Melo	5–7, 3–6
Win	2018	Indian Wells Masters	Hard	(United States) John Isner	(United States) Bob Bryan (United States) Mike Bryan	7–6^{(7–4)}, 7–6^{(7–2)}
Win	2022	Indian Wells Masters	Hard	(United States) John Isner	(Mexico) Santiago González (France) Édouard Roger-Vasselin	7–6^{(7–4)}, 6–3

=== Olympic Medal Matches ===
==== Doubles: 1 (1 Bronze) ====
Result	Year	Tournament	Surface	Partner	Opponents	Score
Bronze	2016	2016 Summer Olympics, Brazil	Hard	(United States) Steve Johnson	(Canada) Daniel Nestor (Canada) Vasek Pospisil	6–2, 6–4

==== Mixed doubles: 1 (1 Gold) ====
Result	Year	Championship	Surface	Partner	Opponents	Score
Gold	2016	2016 Summer Olympics, Brazil	Hard	(United States) Bethanie Mattek-Sands	(United States) Rajeev Ram (United States) Venus Williams	6–7^{(3–7)}, 6–1, [10–7]

== ATP career finals ==
=== Singles: 8 (4 titles, 4 runner-ups) ===
Legend Grand Slam tournaments (0–0) ATP World Tour Finals (0–0) ATP World Tour Masters 1000 (1–0) ATP World Tour 500 Series (0–0) ATP World Tour 250 Series (3–4)	Finals by surface Hard (3–3) Clay (1–1) Grass (0–0)	Finals by setting Outdoor (3–2) Indoor (1–2)

Result	W–L	Date	Tournament	Tier	Surface	Opponent	Score
Win	1–0	Apr 2015	U.S. Men's Clay Court Championships, US	250 Series	Clay	(United States) Sam Querrey	7–6^{(11–9)}, 7–6^{(7–2)}
Loss	1–1	Oct 2015	Stockholm Open, Sweden	250 Series	Hard (i)	(Czech Republic) Tomáš Berdych	6–7^{(1–7)}, 2–6
Loss	1–2	Jan 2016	Auckland Open, New Zealand	250 Series	Hard	(Spain) Roberto Bautista Agut	1–6, 0–1 ret.
Loss	1–3	Apr 2016	U.S. Men's Clay Court Championships, US	250 Series	Clay	(Argentina) Juan Mónaco	6–3, 3–6, 5–7
Loss	1–4	Oct 2016	Stockholm Open, Sweden	250 Series	Hard (i)	(Argentina) Juan Martín del Potro	5–7, 1–6
Win	2–4	Jan 2017	Auckland Open, New Zealand	250 Series	Hard	(Portugal) João Sousa	6–3, 5–7, 6–3
Win	3–4	Feb 2017	Delray Beach Open, US	250 Series	Hard	(Canada) Milos Raonic	Walkover
Win	4–4	Nov 2017	Paris Masters, France	Masters 1000	Hard (i)	(Serbia) Filip Krajinović	5–7, 6–4, 6–1

=== Doubles: 27 (17 titles, 10 runner-ups) ===
Legend Grand Slam tournaments (3–0) ATP World Tour Finals (1–0) ATP World Tour Masters 1000 (4–6) ATP World Tour 500 Series (3–3) ATP World Tour 250 Series (6–1)	Finals by surface Hard (13–9) Clay (1–1) Grass (3–0)	Finals by setting Outdoor (14–7) Indoor (3–3)

Result	W–L	Date	Tournament	Tier	Surface	Partner	Opponents	Score
Loss	0–1	Feb 2013	U.S. National Indoor, US	500 Series	Hard (i)	(United States) James Blake	(United States) Bob Bryan (United States) Mike Bryan	1–6, 2–6
Win	1–1	Mar 2013	Delray Beach Open, US	250 Series	Hard	(United States) James Blake	(Belarus) Max Mirnyi (Romania) Horia Tecău	6–4, 6–4
Win	2–1	Jul 2014	Wimbledon, UK	Grand Slam	Grass	(Canada) Vasek Pospisil	(United States) Bob Bryan (United States) Mike Bryan	7–6^{(7–5)}, 6–7^{(3–7)}, 6–4, 3–6, 7–5
Win	3–1	Jul 2014	Atlanta Open, US	250 Series	Hard	(Canada) Vasek Pospisil	(United States) Steve Johnson (United States) Sam Querrey	6–3, 5–7, [10–5]
Loss	3–2	Aug 2014	Cincinnati Masters, US	Masters 1000	Hard	(Canada) Vasek Pospisil	(United States) Bob Bryan (United States) Mike Bryan	3–6, 2–6
Loss	3–3	Oct 2014	Stockholm Open, Sweden	250 Series	Hard (i)	(Philippines) Treat Huey	(United States) Eric Butorac (South Africa) Raven Klaasen	4–6, 3–6
Win	4–3	Mar 2015	Indian Wells Masters, US	Masters 1000	Hard	(Canada) Vasek Pospisil	(Italy) Simone Bolelli (Italy) Fabio Fognini	6–4, 6–7^{(3–7)}, [10–7]
Loss	4–4	Apr 2015	Miami Open, US	Masters 1000	Hard	(Canada) Vasek Pospisil	(United States) Bob Bryan (United States) Mike Bryan	3–6, 6–1, [8–10]
Win	5–4	Oct 2015	China Open, China	500 Series	Hard	(Canada) Vasek Pospisil	(Canada) Daniel Nestor (France) Édouard Roger-Vasselin	3–6, 6–3, [10–6]
Win	6–4	Oct 2015	Stockholm Open, Sweden	250 Series	Hard (i)	(United States) Nicholas Monroe	(Croatia) Mate Pavić (New Zealand) Michael Venus	7–5, 6–2
Loss	6–5	Nov 2015	Paris Masters, France	Masters 1000	Hard (i)	(Canada) Vasek Pospisil	(Croatia) Ivan Dodig (Brazil) Marcelo Melo	6–2, 3–6, [5–10]
Loss	6–6	Mar 2016	Indian Wells Masters, US	Masters 1000	Hard	(Canada) Vasek Pospisil	(France) Pierre-Hugues Herbert (France) Nicolas Mahut	3–6, 6–7^{(5–7)}
Loss	6–7	May 2016	Italian Open, Italy	Masters 1000	Clay	(Canada) Vasek Pospisil	(United States) Bob Bryan (United States) Mike Bryan	6–2, 3–6, [7–10]
Loss	6–8	Oct 2016	China Open, China	500 Series	Hard	(Australia) Bernard Tomic	(Spain) Pablo Carreño Busta (Spain) Rafael Nadal	7–6^{(8–6)}, 2–6, [8–10]
Win	7–8	Oct 2016	Shanghai Masters, China	Masters 1000	Hard	(United States) John Isner	(Finland) Henri Kontinen (Australia) John Peers	6–4, 6–4
Win	8–8	Oct 2016	Swiss Indoors, Switzerland	500 Series	Hard (i)	(Spain) Marcel Granollers	(Sweden) Robert Lindstedt (New Zealand) Michael Venus	6–3, 6–4
Loss	8–9	Apr 2017	Miami Open, US	Masters 1000	Hard	(United States) Nicholas Monroe	(Poland) Łukasz Kubot (Brazil) Marcelo Melo	5–7, 3–6
Loss	8–10	Oct 2017	China Open, China	500 Series	Hard	(United States) John Isner	(Finland) Henri Kontinen (Australia) John Peers	3–6, 6–3, [7–10]
Win	9–10	Feb 2018	Delray Beach Open, US (2)	250 Series	Hard	(United States) Jackson Withrow	(United States) Nicholas Monroe (Australia) John-Patrick Smith	4–6, 6–4, [10–8]
Win	10–10	Mar 2018	Indian Wells Masters, US (2)	Masters 1000	Hard	(United States) John Isner	(United States) Bob Bryan (United States) Mike Bryan	7–6^{(7–4)}, 7–6^{(7–2)}
Win	11–10	May 2018	Lyon Open, France	250 Series	Clay	(Australia) Nick Kyrgios	(Czech Republic) Roman Jebavý (Netherlands) Matwé Middelkoop	7–5, 2–6, [11–9]
Win	12–10	Jul 2018	Wimbledon, UK (2)	Grand Slam	Grass	(United States) Mike Bryan	(South Africa) Raven Klaasen (New Zealand) Michael Venus	6–3, 6–7^{(7–9)}, 6–3, 5–7, 7–5
Win	13–10	Sep 2018	US Open, US	Grand Slam	Hard	(United States) Mike Bryan	(Poland) Łukasz Kubot (Brazil) Marcelo Melo	6–3, 6–1
Win	14–10	Nov 2018	ATP Finals, UK	Tour Finals	Hard (i)	(United States) Mike Bryan	(France) Pierre-Hugues Herbert (France) Nicolas Mahut	5–7, 6–1, [13–11]
Win	15–10	Jul 2021	Hall of Fame Open, US	250 Series	Grass	(United States) William Blumberg	(United States) Austin Krajicek (Canada) Vasek Pospisil	6–2, 7–6^{(7–3)}
Win	16–10	Mar 2022	Indian Wells Masters, US (3)	Masters 1000	Hard	(United States) John Isner	(Mexico) Santiago González (France) Édouard Roger-Vasselin	7–6^{(7–4)}, 6–3
Win	17–10	Aug 2022	Washington Open, US	500 Series	Hard	(Australia) Nick Kyrgios	(Croatia) Ivan Dodig (United States) Austin Krajicek	7–5, 6–4

== ATP Challenger and ITF Futures finals ==
=== Singles: 11 (6–5) ===
Legend ATP Challenger (4–4) ITF Futures (2–1)	Finals by surface Hard (3–2) Clay (3–2) Grass (0–1) Carpet (0–0)

Result	W–L	Date	Tournament	Tier	Surface	Opponent	Score
Win	1–0	Nov 2009	USA F29, Amelia Island	Futures	Clay	(Russia) Artem Sitak	7–6^{(7–5)}, 1–6, 6–3
Loss	1–1	Jan 2011	USA F3, Weston	Futures	Clay	(United States) Phillip Simmonds	2–6, 2–6
Win	2–1	Jan 2012	USA F1, Plantation	Futures	Clay	(Australia) Jason Kubler	6–2, 7–6^{(7–5)}
Win	3–1	Oct 2012	Tiburon, United States	Challenger	Hard	(Germany) Mischa Zverev	6–1, 1–6, 7–6^{(7–3)}
Loss	3–2	Nov 2012	Champaign, United States	Challenger	Hard (i)	(United States) Tim Smyczek	6–2, 6–7^{(1–7)}, 5–7
Win	4–2	Jul 2013	Winnetka, United States	Challenger	Hard	(United States) Bradley Klahn	6–4, 6–2
Loss	4–3	Apr 2014	Savannah, United States	Challenger	Clay	(Australia) Nick Kyrgios	6–2, 6–7^{(4–7)}, 4–6
Loss	4–4	Mar 2020	Indian Wells, United States	Challenger	Hard	(United States) Steve Johnson	4–6, 4–6
Win	5–4	Jun 2021	Little Rock, United States	Challenger	Hard	(Ecuador) Emilio Gómez	7–5, 6–4
Win	6–4	Apr 2022	Savannah, United States	Challenger	Clay	(United States) Christian Harrison	6–4, 6–1
Loss	6–5	Jun 2022	Ilkley, United Kingdom	Challenger	Grass	(Belgium) Zizou Bergs	6–7^{(7–9)}, 6–2, 6–7^{(6–8)}

=== Doubles: 13 (3–10) ===
Legend ATP Challenger (1–5) ITF Futures (2–5)	Finals by surface Hard (1–6) Clay (2–4) Grass (0–0) Carpet (0–0)

Result	W–L	Date	Tournament	Tier	Surface	Partner	Opponents	Score
Loss	0–1	Jun 2010	USA F15, Chico	Futures	Hard	(Bulgaria) Dimitar Kutrovsky	(Australia) Nima Roshan (Australia) Jose Statham	3–6, 6–0, [8–10]
Loss	0–2	Jul 2010	USA F18, Peoria	Futures	Clay	(United States) Sekou Bangoura	(Australia) Benjamin Rogers (Australia) Taylor Fogleman	2–6, 4–6
Win	1–2	Nov 2010	USA F30, Pensacola	Futures	Clay	(Bulgaria) Dimitar Kutrovsky	(United States) Devin Britton (United States) Jordan Cox	5–7, 6–2, [10–8]
Loss	1–3	Nov 2010	USA F31, Amelia Island	Futures	Clay	(Bulgaria) Dimitar Kutrovsky	(Croatia) Mislav Hizak (United States) Robby Poole	2–6, 6–7^{(3–7)}
Loss	1–4	Jan 2011	USA F3, Weston	Futures	Clay	(Bulgaria) Dimitar Kutrovsky	(South Korea) Soong-Jae Cho (South Korea) Hyun-Joon Kim	3–6, 4–6
Win	2–4	Feb 2011	USA F4, Palm Coast	Futures	Clay	(Bulgaria) Dimitar Kutrovsky	(United States) Gregory Ouellette (United States) Blake Strode	6–3, 3–6, [10–8]
Loss	2–5	Oct 2011	Sacramento, United States	Challenger	Hard	(United States) Nicholas Monroe	(Australia) Carsten Ball (Australia) Chris Guccione	6–7^{(3–7)}, 6–1, [5–10]
Loss	2–6	Jan 2012	USA F1, Plantation	Futures	Clay	(United States) Nicholas Monroe	(United States) Jarmere Jenkins (United States) Drew Courtney	6–7^{(1–7)}, 5–7
Loss	2–7	Jan 2012	Honolulu, United States	Challenger	Hard	(United States) Nicholas Monroe	(United States) Travis Rettenmaier (Bosnia and Herzegovina) Amer Delic	4–6, 6–7^{(3–7)},
Loss	2–8	Feb 2012	Dallas, United States	Challenger	Hard (i)	(United States) Nicholas Monroe	(United Kingdom) Chris Eaton (United Kingdom) Dominic Inglot	7–6^{(8–6)}, 4–6, [17–19]
Loss	2–9	Nov 2012	Charlottesville, United States	Challenger	Hard (i)	(United States) Jarmere Jenkins	(Australia) John Peers (Australia) John-Patrick Smith	5–7, 1–6
Loss	2–10	Jul 2013	Winnetka, United States	Challenger	Hard	(India) Somdev Devvarman	(New Zealand) Michael Venus (India) Yuki Bhambri	6–2, 2–6, [8–10]
Win	3–10	Apr 2021	Orlando, United States	Challenger	Hard	(United States) Mitchell Krueger	(United States) Dennis Novikov (United States) Christian Harrison	4–6, 7–5, [13–11]

== Junior Grand Slam finals ==
=== Singles: 1 (1 title) ===
Result	Year	Tournament	Surface	Opponent	Score
Win	2010	US Open	Hard	(United States) Denis Kudla	3–6, 6–2, 6–2

== National and international representation ==
=== Team competitions finals: 6 (2 titles, 4 runner-ups) ===
Finals by tournaments Olympic Games (1–0) Davis Cup (0–0) Laver Cup (1–3) Hopman Cup (0–1)	Finals by teams United States (1–1) World (1–3)

Result	Date	Tournament	Surface	Team	Partner(s)	Opponent team	Opponent players	Score
Win	Aug 2016	Summer Olympics, Rio de Janeiro, Brazil	Hard	United States	Bethanie Mattek-Sands	United States	Venus Williams; Rajeev Ram	2–1
Loss	Jan 2017	Hopman Cup, Perth, Australia	Hard (i)	United States	Coco Vandeweghe	France	Kristina Mladenovic; Richard Gasquet	1–2
Loss	Sep 2017	Laver Cup, Prague, Czech Republic	Hard (i)	Team World	Sam Querrey; John Isner; Nick Kyrgios; Denis Shapovalov; Frances Tiafoe	Team Europe	Roger Federer; Rafael Nadal; Alexander Zverev; Marin Čilić; Dominic Thiem; Tomáš Berdych	9–15
Loss	Sep 2018	Laver Cup, Chicago, United States	Hard (i)	Team World	Kevin Anderson; John Isner; Diego Schwartzman; Nick Kyrgios; Frances Tiafoe	Team Europe	Roger Federer; Novak Djokovic; Alexander Zverev; Grigor Dimitrov; David Goffin; Kyle Edmund	8–13
Loss	Sep 2019	Laver Cup, Geneva, Switzerland	Hard (i)	Team World	John Isner; Milos Raonic; Nick Kyrgios; Taylor Fritz; Denis Shapovalov	Team Europe	Roger Federer; Rafael Nadal; Dominic Thiem; Alexander Zverev; Stefanos Tsitsipas; Fabio Fognini	11–13
Win	Sep 2022	Laver Cup, London, United Kingdom	Hard (i)	Team World	Taylor Fritz; Félix Auger-Aliassime; Diego Schwartzman; Frances Tiafoe; Alex de Minaur	Team Europe	Casper Ruud; Rafael Nadal; Stefanos Tsitsipas; Novak Djokovic; Andy Murray; Roger Federer; Matteo Berrettini; Cameron Norrie	13–8

== Team Tennis Leagues ==
=== League finals: 1 (1 championship) ===
Finals by leagues World TeamTennis (WTT) (1–0)	Finals by club teams Springfield Lasers (1–0)	League table results 1st place (0) 2nd place (1) 3rd place (0) 4th place (1)	Awards Top Draft Pick: 1 (2017 WTT)

Place	Date	League	Location(s)	Surface(s)	Team	Teammates	Opponent teams
4th	Jul-Aug 2017	World TeamTennis (WTT)	United States	Hard, Hard (i)	(United States) Springfield Lasers	(South Africa) John-Laffnie de Jager (HC) (Netherlands) Jean-Julien Rojer (R) (Russia) Daria Kasatkina (R) (Germany) Benjamin Becker (R) (Netherlands) Michaëlla Krajicek (R)	(United States); Orange County Breakers: Champions (1st); San Diego Aviators: Runners-up (2nd); New York Empire: 3rd Philadelphia Freedoms: 5th Washington Kastles: 6th
Champions (2nd)	Jul-Aug 2018	World TeamTennis (WTT)	United States	Hard, Hard (i)	(United States) Springfield Lasers	(South Africa) John-Laffnie de Jager (HC) (Serbia) Miomir Kecmanović (R) (United States) Vania King (R) (Canada) Daniel Nestor (R) (United States) Abigail Spears (R)	(United States); Philadelphia Freedoms: Runners-up (1st); Washington Kastles: 3rd San Diego Aviators: 4th Orange County Breakers: 5th New York Empire: 6th

*(HC): Head Coach, (F): Franchise Player, (W): Wildcard Player, (R): Roster Player, (S): Substitute Player

== Wins over top 10 players ==
- Sock had a 9–30 record against players who were, at the time the match was played, ranked in the top 10.

Year	2011	2012	2013	2014	2015	2016	2017	2018	2019	2020	2021	2022	2023	Total
Wins	0	0	0	1	0	4	4	0	0	0	0	0	0	9

#	Player	Rank	Event	Surface	Rd	Score	JSR
2014
1.	(Japan) Kei Nishikori	6	Shanghai, China	Hard	2R	7–6^{(7–5)}, 6–4	60
2016
2.	(Spain) David Ferrer	8	Auckland, New Zealand	Hard	SF	3–6, 6–1, 6–2	26
3.	(Croatia) Marin Čilić	9	US Open, New York, United States	Hard	3R	6–4, 6–3, 6–3	27
4.	(Canada) Milos Raonic	6	Shanghai, China	Hard	3R	0–6, 6–4, 7–6^{(10–8)}	26
5.	(Austria) Dominic Thiem	8	Paris, France	Hard (i)	2R	6–2, 6–4	24
2017
6.	(Japan) Kei Nishikori	5	Indian Wells, United States	Hard	QF	6–3, 2–6, 6–2	18
7.	(Canada) Milos Raonic	10	Washington, United States	Hard	QF	7–5, 6–4	19
8.	(Croatia) Marin Čilić	5	ATP Finals, London, United Kingdom	Hard (i)	RR	5–7, 6–2, 7–6^{(7–4)}	9
9.	(Germany) Alexander Zverev	3	ATP Finals, London, United Kingdom	Hard (i)	RR	6–4, 1–6, 6–4	9
