= 2015 Miami Open – Women's doubles =

Women's doubles
- 2015 Miami Open

Final
- Champions: (Switzerland) Martina Hingis (India) Sania Mirza
- Runners-up: (Russia) Ekaterina Makarova (Russia) Elena Vesnina
- Score: 7–5, 6–1

Details
- Draw: 32
- Seeds: 8

Events
Singles	men	women
Doubles	men	women
- Miami Masters

Martina Hingis and Sabine Lisicki were the defending champions, but Lisicki chose not to participate this year. Hingis played alongside Sania Mirza and successfully defended the title, defeating Ekaterina Makarova and Elena Vesnina in the final, 7–5, 6–1. The win in the final allowed Hingis and Mirza to be the fourth doubles partnership in history to win the Sunshine Double.

== Seeds ==
1. (Switzerland) Martina Hingis / (India) Sania Mirza (champions)
2. (Russia) Ekaterina Makarova / (Russia) Elena Vesnina (final)
3. (United States) Raquel Kops-Jones / (United States) Abigail Spears (first round)
4. (Chinese Taipei) Hsieh Su-wei / (Italy) Flavia Pennetta (second round)
5. (Spain) Garbiñe Muguruza / (Spain) Carla Suárez Navarro (second round)
6. (China) Peng Shuai / (Czech Republic) Lucie Šafářová (withdrew because of a back injury for Peng)
7. (Hungary) Tímea Babos / (France) Kristina Mladenovic (semifinals)
8. (France) Caroline Garcia / (Slovenia) Katarina Srebotnik (quarterfinals)
9. (Czech Republic) Andrea Hlaváčková / (Czech Republic) Lucie Hradecká (semifinals)

== Draw ==
Key

- Q = Qualifier
- WC = Wild card
- LL = Lucky loser
- Alt = Alternate
- ITF = ITF entry
- PR = Protected ranking
- SR = Special ranking
- SE = Special exempt
- JE = Junior exempt
- JR = Junior Accelerator Programme entrant
- CO = College Accelerator Programme entrant
- NG = Next Gen Accelerator Program entrant
- w/o = Walkover
- r = Retired
- d = Defaulted

=== Finals ===
Semifinals
1	(Switzerland) Martina Hingis (India) Sania Mirza	6	6
7	(Hungary) Tímea Babos (France) Kristina Mladenovic	2	4
9	(Czech Republic) Andrea Hlaváčková (Czech Republic) Lucie Hradecká	4	2
2	(Russia) Ekaterina Makarova (Russia) Elena Vesnina	6	6

Final
1	(Switzerland) Martina Hingis (India) Sania Mirza	7	6
2	(Russia) Ekaterina Makarova (Russia) Elena Vesnina	5	1

=== Top half ===
First round
1	(Switzerland) M Hingis (India) S Mirza	6	6
Alt	(Romania) E Bogdan (United States) N Melichar	1	0
(Canada) G Dabrowski (Poland) A Rosolska	7^{7}	6
(Spain) A Medina Garrigues (Croatia) A Tomljanović	6^{3}	3
(Australia) C Dellacqua (Croatia) D Jurak	3	6^{5}
(Australia) An Rodionova (Australia) Ar Rodionova	6	7^{7}
(Ukraine) O Savchuk (Spain) MT Torró Flor	3	2
5	(Spain) G Muguruza (Spain) C Suárez Navarro	6	6
3	(United States) R Kops-Jones (United States) A Spears	6	3	[2]
(Russia) V Dushevina (Spain) MJ Martínez Sánchez	2	6	[10]
(Germany) J Görges (Germany) A-L Grönefeld	7^{7}	4	[10]
Alt	(Slovakia) M Rybáriková (China) S Zheng	6^{0}	6	[8]
(Czech Republic) K Koukalová (Czech Republic) K Siniaková	2	0
(Russia) A Kudryavtseva (Russia) A Pavlyuchenkova	6	6
(Japan) K Date-Krumm (Czech Republic) Ka Plíšková	2	7^{7}	[11]
7	(Hungary) T Babos (France) K Mladenovic	6	6^{5}	[13]

Second round
1	(Switzerland) M Hingis (India) S Mirza	7^{8}	6
(Canada) G Dabrowski (Poland) A Rosolska	6^{6}	4
(Australia) An Rodionova (Australia) Ar Rodionova	7	6
5	(Spain) G Muguruza (Spain) C Suárez Navarro	5	1
(Russia) V Dushevina (Spain) MJ Martínez Sánchez	7^{7}	3	[10]
(Germany) J Görges (Germany) A-L Grönefeld	6^{2}	6	[7]
(Russia) A Kudryavtseva (Russia) A Pavlyuchenkova	1	3
7	(Hungary) T Babos (France) K Mladenovic	6	6

Quarterfinals
1	(Switzerland) M Hingis (India) S Mirza	6	6
(Australia) An Rodionova (Australia) Ar Rodionova	3	4
(Russia) V Dushevina (Spain) MJ Martínez Sánchez	1	2
7	(Hungary) T Babos (France) K Mladenovic	6	6

Semifinals
1	(Switzerland) M Hingis (India) S Mirza	6	6
7	(Hungary) T Babos (France) K Mladenovic	2	4

=== Bottom half ===
First round
9	(Czech Republic) A Hlaváčková (Czech Republic) L Hradecká	7	4	[10]
(Japan) S Aoyama (Czech Republic) R Voráčová	5	6	[5]
(Poland) K Jans-Ignacik (Slovenia) A Klepač	7	6
(Netherlands) K Bertens (Germany) T Maria	5	4
(United States) L Raymond (Australia) S Stosur	2	3
(Romania) M Niculescu (Russia) A Panova	6	6
WC	(France) A Cornet (Ukraine) E Svitolina	1	3
4	(Chinese Taipei) S-w Hsieh (Italy) F Pennetta	6	6
8	(France) C Garcia (Slovenia) K Srebotnik	6	6
WC	(Puerto Rico) M Puig (United Kingdom) H Watson	3	3
(Chinese Taipei) H-c Chan (Serbia) J Janković	7	6
(Spain) A Parra Santonja (Spain) S Soler Espinosa	5	4
WC	(Slovakia) D Hantuchová (Italy) K Knapp	7	6
WC	(Romania) A Dulgheru (Romania) S Halep	5	3
(Netherlands) M Krajicek (Czech Republic) B Záhlavová-Strýcová	2	6	[4]
2	(Russia) E Makarova (Russia) E Vesnina	6	2	[10]

Second round
9	(Czech Republic) A Hlaváčková (Czech Republic) L Hradecká	6	6
(Poland) K Jans-Ignacik (Slovenia) A Klepač	4	4
(Romania) M Niculescu (Russia) A Panova	3	6	[11]
4	(Chinese Taipei) S-w Hsieh (Italy) F Pennetta	6	3	[9]
8	(France) C Garcia (Slovenia) K Srebotnik	6	6
(Chinese Taipei) H-c Chan (Serbia) J Janković	1	3
WC	(Slovakia) D Hantuchová (Italy) K Knapp	2	2
2	(Russia) E Makarova (Russia) E Vesnina	6	6

Quarterfinals
9	(Czech Republic) A Hlaváčková (Czech Republic) L Hradecká	6	7
(Romania) M Niculescu (Russia) A Panova	3	5
8	(France) C Garcia (Slovenia) K Srebotnik	4	6	[4]
2	(Russia) E Makarova (Russia) E Vesnina	6	3	[10]

Semifinals
9	(Czech Republic) A Hlaváčková (Czech Republic) L Hradecká	4	2
2	(Russia) E Makarova (Russia) E Vesnina	6	6
