= 2015 Miami Open =

- Date: March 24 – April 5
- Edition: 31st
- Category: Masters 1000 (ATP); Premier Mandatory (WTA)
- Draw: 96S / 48Q / 32D
- Prize money: $6,267,755 (ATP) $6,157,160 (WTA)
- Surface: Hard - outdoor
- Location: Key Biscayne, Florida, United States
- Venue: Tennis Center at Crandon Park

Champions

Men's singles
- (Serbia) Novak Djokovic

Women's singles
- (United States) Serena Williams

Men's doubles
- (United States) Bob Bryan / (United States) Mike Bryan

Women's doubles
- (Switzerland) Martina Hingis / (India) Sania Mirza
- Miami Open

The 2015 Miami Open presented by Itaú, also known as 2015 Miami Masters, was a professional men and women's tennis tournament played on outdoor hard courts. It was the 31st edition of the Miami Masters, and was part of the Masters 1000 category on the 2015 ATP World Tour, and of the Premier Mandatory category on the 2015 WTA Tour. All men and women's events took place at the Tennis Center at Crandon Park in Key Biscayne, Florida, United States, from March 24 through April 5, 2015.

== Finals ==
=== Men's singles ===
- (Serbia) Novak Djokovic defeated (United Kingdom) Andy Murray, 7–6^{(7–3)}, 4–6, 6–0

=== Women's singles ===
- (United States) Serena Williams defeated (Spain) Carla Suárez Navarro, 6–2, 6–0

=== Men's doubles ===
- (United States) Bob Bryan / (United States) Mike Bryan defeated (Canada) Vasek Pospisil / (United States) Jack Sock, 6–3, 1–6, [10–8]

=== Women's doubles ===
- (Switzerland) Martina Hingis / (India) Sania Mirza defeated (Russia) Ekaterina Makarova / (Russia) Elena Vesnina, 7–5, 6–1

== Points and prize money ==
=== Point distribution ===
Event	W	F	SF	QF	Round of 16	Round of 32	Round of 64	Round of 128	Q	Q2	Q1
Men's singles	1000	600	360	180	90	45	25*	10	16	8	0
Men's doubles	1000	600	360	180	90	0	—N/a	—N/a	—N/a	—N/a	—N/a
Women's singles	1000	650	390	215	120	65	35*	10	30	20	2
Women's doubles	1000	650	390	215	120	10	—N/a	—N/a	—N/a	—N/a	—N/a

- Players with byes receive first round points.

=== Prize money ===
Event	W	F	SF	QF	Round of 16	Round of 32	Round of 64	Round of 128	Q2	Q1
Men's singles	$900,400	$439,420	$220,230	$112,270	$59,185	$31,670	$17,100	$10,485	$3,125	$1,600
Women's singles	$900,400	$439,420	$220,230	$112,270	$59,185	$31,670	$17,100	$10,485	$3,125	$1,600
Men's doubles	$295,000	$143,980	$72,170	$36,770	$19,390	$10,380	—N/a	—N/a	—N/a	—N/a
Women's doubles	$295,000	$143,980	$72,170	$36,770	$19,390	$10,380	—N/a	—N/a	—N/a	—N/a

== ATP singles main-draw entrants ==
=== Seeds ===
Country	Player	Rank^{1}	Seed
SRB	Novak Djokovic	1	1
ESP	Rafael Nadal	3	2
GBR	Andy Murray	4	3
JPN	Kei Nishikori	5	4
CAN	Milos Raonic	6	5
ESP	David Ferrer	7	6
SUI	Stan Wawrinka	8	7
CZE	Tomáš Berdych	9	8
BUL	Grigor Dimitrov	11	9
ESP	Feliciano López	12	10
FRA	Jo-Wilfried Tsonga	13	11
FRA	Gilles Simon	14	12
ESP	Roberto Bautista Agut	15	13
LAT	Ernests Gulbis	16	14
RSA	Kevin Anderson	17	15
ESP	Tommy Robredo	18	16
FRA	Gaël Monfils	19	17
BEL	David Goffin	20	18
URU	Pablo Cuevas	21	19
CRO	Ivo Karlović	22	20
ITA	Fabio Fognini	23	21
USA	John Isner	24	22
ESP	Guillermo García López	25	23
ARG	Leonardo Mayer	27	24
AUS	Bernard Tomic	29	25
CZE	Lukáš Rosol	30	26
COL	Santiago Giraldo	31	27
FRA	Adrian Mannarino	32	28
ESP	Fernando Verdasco	34	29
LUX	Gilles Müller	36	30
FRA	Jérémy Chardy	38	31
SRB	Viktor Troicki	39	32

- ^{1} Rankings are as of March 23, 2015.

==== Other entrants ====
The following players got wildcards into the singles main draw:

- (South Korea) Chung Hyeon
- (United Kingdom) Kyle Edmund
- (United States) Ryan Harrison
- (Australia) Thanasi Kokkinakis
- (Russia) Andrey Rublev

The following players received entry using a protected ranking into the singles main draw:

- (Spain) Nicolás Almagro
- (Argentina) Juan Martín del Potro

The following players received entry from the qualifying draw:

- (Belgium) Ruben Bemelmans
- (Germany) Michael Berrer
- (Belgium) Steve Darcis
- (Australia) James Duckworth
- (Bosnia and Herzegovina) Damir Džumhur
- (Colombia) Alejandro Falla
- (Netherlands) Robin Haase
- (United States) Austin Krajicek
- (Serbia) Filip Krajinović
- (Spain) Adrián Menéndez Maceiras
- (France) Édouard Roger-Vasselin
- (Germany) Alexander Zverev

==== Withdrawals ====
Before the tournament

- (France) Julien Benneteau → replaced by (Croatia) Borna Ćorić
- (Croatia) Marin Čilić → replaced by (Australia) Lleyton Hewitt
- (Switzerland) Roger Federer (schedule change) → replaced by (Finland) Jarkko Nieminen
- (United States) Mardy Fish → replaced by (United States) Tim Smyczek
- (France) Richard Gasquet (back injury) → replaced by (Serbia) Dušan Lajović
- (Germany) Philipp Kohlschreiber → replaced by (Lithuania) Ričardas Berankis
- (Australia) Nick Kyrgios (foot injury) → replaced by (Australia) Marinko Matosevic
- (Italy) Andreas Seppi → replaced by (Japan) Go Soeda
- (Czech Republic) Radek Štěpánek → replaced by (Kazakhstan) Andrey Golubev
- (Serbia) Janko Tipsarević → replaced by (Austria) Jürgen Melzer

==== Retirements ====
- (Serbia) Dušan Lajović
- (Chinese Taipei) Lu Yen-hsun
- (France) Gaël Monfils

== ATP doubles main-draw entrants ==
=== Seeds ===
Country	Player	Country	Player	Rank^{1}	Seed
USA	Bob Bryan	USA	Mike Bryan	2	1
CAN	Vasek Pospisil	USA	Jack Sock	18	2
BRA	Marcelo Melo	BRA	Bruno Soares	19	3
NED	Jean-Julien Rojer	ROU	Horia Tecău	24	4
ESP	Marcel Granollers	ESP	Marc López	25	5
POL	Marcin Matkowski	SRB	Nenad Zimonjić	26	6
FRA	Nicolas Mahut	FRA	Édouard Roger-Vasselin	29	7
IND	Rohan Bopanna	CAN	Daniel Nestor	31	8

- ^{1} Rankings as of March 23, 2015.

==== Other entrants ====
The following pairs received wildcards into the doubles main draw:

- (Brazil) Thomaz Bellucci / (Brazil) João Souza
- (United States) Ryan Harrison / (United States) Rajeev Ram

==== Retirements ====
- (Spain) Roberto Bautista Agut (left eye injury)
- (Spain) Marc López (ankle injury)

== WTA singles main-draw entrants ==
=== Seeds ===
Country	Player	Rank^{1}	Seed
USA	Serena Williams	1	1
RUS	Maria Sharapova	2	2
ROU	Simona Halep	3	3
DEN	Caroline Wozniacki	5	4
SRB	Ana Ivanovic	6	5
CAN	Eugenie Bouchard	7	6
POL	Agnieszka Radwańska	8	7
RUS	Ekaterina Makarova	9	8
GER	Andrea Petkovic	10	9
CZE	Lucie Šafářová	11	10
ITA	Sara Errani	12	11
ESP	Carla Suárez Navarro	13	12
GER	Angelique Kerber	14	13
CZE	Karolína Plíšková	15	14
ITA	Flavia Pennetta	16	15
USA	Venus Williams	17	16
USA	Madison Keys	18	17
~~CHN~~	~~Peng Shuai~~	~~19~~	~~18~~
CZE	Barbora Záhlavová-Strýcová	20	19
SRB	Jelena Janković	21	20
ESP	Garbiñe Muguruza	22	21
FRA	Alizé Cornet	24	22
AUS	Samantha Stosur	25	23
RUS	Svetlana Kuznetsova	27	24
FRA	Caroline Garcia	28	25
UKR	Elina Svitolina	29	26
GER	Sabine Lisicki	30	27
USA	Varvara Lepchenko	31	28
KAZ	Zarina Diyas	32	29
ITA	Camila Giorgi	33	30
ROU	Irina-Camelia Begu	34	31
AUS	Casey Dellacqua	35	32

- ^{1} Rankings are as of March 9, 2015.

==== Other entrants ====
The following players got wildcards into the singles main draw:

- (Canada) Françoise Abanda
- (Spain) Paula Badosa Gibert
- (United States) Catherine Bellis
- (Romania) Sorana Cîrstea
- (Netherlands) Indy de Vroome
- (Russia) Daria Gavrilova
- (Czech Republic) Nicole Vaidišová
- (Russia) Natalia Vikhlyantseva

The following player received entry using a protected ranking into the singles main draw:

- (Russia) Vera Zvonareva

The following players received entry from the qualifying draw:

- (Hungary) Tímea Babos
- (Romania) Alexandra Dulgheru
- (New Zealand) Marina Erakovic
- (United States) Irina Falconi
- (Bulgaria) Sesil Karatantcheva
- (Ukraine) Kateryna Kozlova
- (Germany) Tatjana Maria
- (France) Pauline Parmentier
- (Poland) Urszula Radwańska
- (Russia) Evgeniya Rodina
- (Belgium) Alison Van Uytvanck
- (Switzerland) Stefanie Vögele

The following players received entry as a lucky loser:

- (China) Zheng Saisai

==== Withdrawals ====
Before the tournament

- (Switzerland) Timea Bacsinszky (left ankle injury) → replaced by (Serbia) Aleksandra Krunić
- (Slovakia) Dominika Cibulková (Achilles surgery) → replaced by (Slovenia) Polona Hercog
- (Australia) Jarmila Gajdošová (bacterial infection) → replaced by (Czech Republic) Kateřina Siniaková
- (Czech Republic) Petra Kvitová (exhaustion) → replaced by (United States) Shelby Rogers
- (China) Peng Shuai (back injury) → replaced by (China) Zheng Saisai

==== Retirements ====
- (New Zealand) Marina Erakovic (left ankle injury)

== WTA doubles main-draw entrants ==
=== Seeds ===
Country	Player	Country	Player	Rank^{1}	Seed
SUI	Martina Hingis	IND	Sania Mirza	12	1
RUS	Ekaterina Makarova	RUS	Elena Vesnina	16	2
USA	Raquel Kops-Jones	USA	Abigail Spears	20	3
TPE	Hsieh Su-wei	ITA	Flavia Pennetta	21	4
ESP	Garbiñe Muguruza	ESP	Carla Suárez Navarro	25	5
~~CHN~~	~~Peng Shuai~~	~~CZE~~	~~Lucie Šafářová~~	~~27~~	~~6~~
HUN	Tímea Babos	FRA	Kristina Mladenovic	31	7
FRA	Caroline Garcia	SLO	Katarina Srebotnik	43	8
CZE	Andrea Hlaváčková	CZE	Lucie Hradecká	46	9

- ^{1} Rankings as of March 9, 2015.

==== Other entrants ====
The following pairs received wildcards into the doubles main draw:

- (France) Alizé Cornet / (Ukraine) Elina Svitolina
- (Romania) Alexandra Dulgheru / (Romania) Simona Halep
- (Slovakia) Daniela Hantuchová / (Italy) Karin Knapp
- (Puerto Rico) Monica Puig / (United Kingdom) Heather Watson

The following pairs received entry as alternates:

- (Romania) Elena Bogdan / (United States) Nicole Melichar
- (Slovakia) Magdaléna Rybáriková / (China) Zheng Saisai

==== Withdrawals ====
Before the tournament

- (New Zealand) Marina Erakovic (left ankle injury during first round singles match)
- (China) Peng Shuai (back injury)
