= 2016 Italian Open – Men's singles =

Men's singles
- 2016 Italian Open

Final
- Champion: (United Kingdom) Andy Murray
- Runner-up: (Serbia) Novak Djokovic
- Score: 6–3, 6–3

Events
Singles	men	women
Doubles	men	women
← 2015 ·	Italian Open	· 2017 →

Andy Murray defeated two-time defending champion Novak Djokovic in the final, 6–3, 6–3 to win the men's singles tennis title at the 2016 Italian Open. It was his twelfth Masters 1000 title.

This was the first Italian Open in eleven years not won by either Rafael Nadal or Djokovic.

== Seeds ==
The top eight seeds receive a bye into the second round.

1. (Serbia) Novak Djokovic (final)
2. (United Kingdom) Andy Murray (champion)
3. (Switzerland) Roger Federer (third round)
4. (Switzerland) Stan Wawrinka (third round)
5. (Spain) Rafael Nadal (quarterfinals)
6. (Japan) Kei Nishikori (semifinals)
7. (France) ~~Jo-Wilfried Tsonga~~ (withdrew due to muscle strain)
8. (Czech Republic) Tomáš Berdych (third round)

9. (Spain) David Ferrer (third round)
10. (Canada) Milos Raonic (second round)
11. (France) Richard Gasquet (third round)
12. (Belgium) David Goffin (quarterfinals)
13. (Austria) Dominic Thiem (quarterfinals)
14. (France) Gaël Monfils (first round)
15. (Spain) Roberto Bautista Agut (second round)
16. (South Africa) Kevin Anderson (second round)

== Draw ==
=== Key ===
- Q = Qualifier
- WC = Wild card
- LL = Lucky loser
- Alt = Alternate
- ITF = ITF entry
- PR = Protected ranking
- SR = Special ranking
- SE = Special exempt
- JE = Junior exempt
- JR = Junior Accelerator Programme entrant
- CO = College Accelerator Programme entrant
- NG = Next Gen Accelerator Program entrant
- w/o = Walkover
- r = Retired
- d = Defaulted

=== Finals ===
Quarterfinals
1	(Serbia) Novak Djokovic	7	7^{7}
5	(Spain) Rafael Nadal	5	6^{4}
13	(Austria) Dominic Thiem	3	5
6	(Japan) Kei Nishikori	6	7
LL	(France) Lucas Pouille	w/o
PR	(Argentina) Juan Mónaco
12	(Belgium) David Goffin	1	5
2	(United Kingdom) Andy Murray	6	7

Semifinals
1	(Serbia) Novak Djokovic	2	6	7^{7}
6	(Japan) Kei Nishikori	6	4	6^{5}
LL	(France) Lucas Pouille	2	1
2	(United Kingdom) Andy Murray	6	6

Final
1	(Serbia) Novak Djokovic	3	3
2	(United Kingdom) Andy Murray	6	6

=== Top half ===
==== Section 1 ====
First round
Q	(France) S Robert	7^{7}	7^{10}
Q	(United Kingdom) A Bedene	6^{3}	6^{8}
(Uruguay) P Cuevas	6^{6}	6	5
(France) N Mahut	7^{8}	2	7
(Brazil) T Bellucci	6	7^{7}
14	(France) G Monfils	3	6^{2}
10	(Canada) M Raonic	6	4	6
WC	(Italy) M Cecchinato	4	6	4
(Australia) N Kyrgios	6	6
WC	(Italy) S Caruso	1	2
(Germany) P Kohlschreiber	6	6
Q	(Spain) Í Cervantes	4	2

Second round
1	(Serbia) N Djokovic	7	7
Q	(France) S Robert	5	5
(France) N Mahut	4	3
(Brazil) T Bellucci	6	6
10	(Canada) M Raonic	6^{5}	3
(Australia) N Kyrgios	7^{7}	6
(Germany) P Kohlschreiber	3	3
5	(Spain) R Nadal	6	6

Third round
1	(Serbia) N Djokovic	0	6	6
(Brazil) T Bellucci	6	3	2
(Australia) N Kyrgios	7^{7}	2	4
5	(Spain) R Nadal	6^{3}	6	6

Quarterfinals
1	(Serbia) N Djokovic	7	7^{7}
5	(Spain) R Nadal	5	6^{4}

==== Section 2 ====
First round
(Germany) A Zverev	6	6
(Bulgaria) G Dimitrov	1	4
(Portugal) J Sousa	6^{5}	6	7
WC	(Italy) L Sonego	7^{7}	3	5
(Ukraine) A Dolgopolov	3	6	4
13	(Austria) D Thiem	6	3	6
11	(France) R Gasquet	6	6
PR	(France) J Benneteau	3	0
(Italy) A Seppi	7^{7}	7^{7}
(Canada) V Pospisil	6^{5}	6^{2}
(Russia) T Gabashvili	4	1
(Serbia) V Troicki	6	6

Second round
3	(Switzerland) R Federer	6	7
(Germany) A Zverev	3	5
(Portugal) J Sousa	3	2
13	(Austria) D Thiem	6	6
11	(France) R Gasquet	6	6
(Italy) A Seppi	3	4
(Serbia) V Troicki	7	2	3
6	(Japan) K Nishikori	5	6	6

Third round
3	(Switzerland) R Federer	6^{2}	4
13	(Austria) D Thiem	7^{7}	6
11	(France) R Gasquet	1	4
6	(Japan) K Nishikori	6	6

Quarterfinals
13	(Austria) D Thiem	3	5
6	(Japan) K Nishikori	6	7

=== Bottom half ===
==== Section 3 ====
First round
(Croatia) I Karlović	7^{7}	2	3
Q	(Latvia) E Gulbis	6^{3}	6	6
(Italy) F Fognini	1	6^{2}
(Spain) G García López	6	7^{7}
Q	(Italy) F Volandri	6	5	1
9	(Spain) D Ferrer	4	7	6
16	(South Africa) K Anderson	6	7^{7}
(Spain) F López	4	6^{5}
(United States) S Johnson	4	4
PR	(Argentina) J Mónaco	6	6
(France) B Paire	1
(Australia) B Tomic	2^{r}

Second round
LL	(France) L Pouille	3	6	7
Q	(Latvia) E Gulbis	6	4	5
(Spain) G García López	4	3
9	(Spain) D Ferrer	6	6
16	(South Africa) K Anderson	6	3	2
PR	(Argentina) J Mónaco	3	6	6
(France) B Paire	7	2	1
4	(Switzerland) S Wawrinka	5	6	6

Third round
LL	(France) L Pouille	6	6
9	(Spain) D Ferrer	4	1
PR	(Argentina) J Mónaco	6^{5}	6	6
4	(Switzerland) S Wawrinka	7^{7}	3	4

Quarterfinals
LL	(France) L Pouille	w/o
PR	(Argentina) J Mónaco

==== Section 4 ====
First round
(Spain) A Ramos Viñolas	6	6
(United States) S Querrey	4	4
(United States) J Sock	5	7	6
(Argentina) G Pella	7	5	3
(Argentina) L Mayer	6	6^{8}	3
12	(Belgium) D Goffin	2	7^{10}	6
15	(Spain) R Bautista Agut	6	6
(Italy) P Lorenzi	3	1
(France) J Chardy	2	6	6
Q	(Bosnia and Herzegovina) D Džumhur	6	4	2
Q	(Kazakhstan) M Kukushkin	7^{7}	5	6
(Croatia) B Ćorić	6^{5}	7	4

Second round
8	(Czech Republic) T Berdych	6	6
(Spain) A Ramos Viñolas	3	4
(United States) J Sock	4	4
12	(Belgium) D Goffin	6	6
15	(Spain) R Bautista Agut	6^{6}	4
(France) J Chardy	7^{8}	6
Q	(Kazakhstan) M Kukushkin	3	3
2	(United Kingdom) A Murray	6	6

Third round
8	(Czech Republic) T Berdych	0	0
12	(Belgium) D Goffin	6	6
(France) J Chardy	0	4
2	(United Kingdom) A Murray	6	6

Quarterfinals
12	(Belgium) D Goffin	1	5
2	(United Kingdom) A Murray	6	7

== Qualifying ==
=== Seeds ===
1. (France) Lucas Pouille (qualifying competition, lucky loser)
2. (United Kingdom) Aljaž Bedene (qualified)
3. (France) Paul-Henri Mathieu (first round)
4. (United States) Denis Kudla (qualifying competition)
5. (Tunisia) Malek Jaziri (first round, retired)
6. (Netherlands) Robin Haase (qualifying competition)
7. (Spain) Íñigo Cervantes (qualified)
8. (Serbia) Dušan Lajović (first round)
9. (United States) Taylor Fritz (first round)
10. (Bosnia and Herzegovina) Damir Džumhur (qualified)
11. (United States) Rajeev Ram (qualifying competition)
12. (Latvia) Ernests Gulbis (qualified)
13. (Kazakhstan) Mikhail Kukushkin (qualified)
14. (Germany) Benjamin Becker (withdrew)

=== Qualifiers ===
1. (Kazakhstan) Mikhail Kukushkin
2. (United Kingdom) Aljaž Bedene
3. (France) Stéphane Robert
4. (Latvia) Ernests Gulbis
5. (Italy) Filippo Volandri
6. (Bosnia and Herzegovina) Damir Džumhur
7. (Spain) Íñigo Cervantes

=== Lucky losers ===
1. (France) Lucas Pouille

=== Qualifying draw ===
==== First qualifier ====
First round
1	(France) Lucas Pouille	6	6
(Italy) Andrea Arnaboldi	2	3
Alt	(Italy) Federico Gaio	7^{7}	4	4
13	(Kazakhstan) Mikhail Kukushkin	6^{2}	6	6

Qualifying competition
1	(France) Lucas Pouille	5	2
13	(Kazakhstan) Mikhail Kukushkin	7	6

==== Second qualifier ====
First round
2	(United Kingdom) Aljaž Bedene	4	6	6
WC	(Italy) Omar Giacalone	6	3	1
(France) Kenny de Schepper	6	7
8	(Serbia) Dušan Lajović	3	5

Qualifying competition
2	(United Kingdom) Aljaž Bedene	6	6
(France) Kenny de Schepper	3	3

==== Third qualifier ====
First round
3	(France) Paul-Henri Mathieu	2	6	5
(France) Stéphane Robert	6	4	7
(Colombia) Santiago Giraldo	6	3	6^{3}
Alt	(Italy) Matteo Donati	4	6	7^{7}

Qualifying competition
(France) Stéphane Robert	6	6
Alt	(Italy) Matteo Donati	2	4

==== Fourth qualifier ====
First round
4	(United States) Denis Kudla	7^{7}	6
Alt	(Italy) Alessandro Giannessi	6^{3}	4
(Italy) Luca Vanni	2	4
12	(Latvia) Ernests Gulbis	6	6

Qualifying competition
4	(United States) Denis Kudla	3	2
12	(Latvia) Ernests Gulbis	6	6

==== Fifth qualifier ====
First round
5	(Tunisia) Malek Jaziri	4	1^{r}
Alt	(Italy) Filippo Volandri	6	4
(Czech Republic) Radek Štěpánek	4	7^{7}	6
9	(United States) Taylor Fritz	6	6^{4}	1

Qualifying competition
Alt	(Italy) Filippo Volandri	1	6	6
(Czech Republic) Radek Štěpánek	6	3	3

==== Sixth qualifier ====
First round
6	(Netherlands) Robin Haase	6	6
WC	(Italy) Lorenzo Giustino	2	4
WC	(Italy) Andrea Vavassori	4	1
10	(Bosnia and Herzegovina) Damir Džumhur	6	6

Qualifying competition
6	(Netherlands) Robin Haase	2	6	4
10	(Bosnia and Herzegovina) Damir Džumhur	6	2	6

==== Seventh qualifier ====
First round
7	(Spain) Íñigo Cervantes	6	6
(Italy) Thomas Fabbiano	4	3
WC	(Italy) Matteo Viola	6	3	3
11	(United States) Rajeev Ram	1	6	6

Qualifying competition
7	(Spain) Íñigo Cervantes	6	3	7
11	(United States) Rajeev Ram	4	6	5
