= 2015 Miami Open – Men's singles =

Men's singles
- 2015 Miami Open

Final
- Champion: (Serbia) Novak Djokovic
- Runner-up: (United Kingdom) Andy Murray
- Score: 7–6^{(7–3)}, 4–6, 6–0

Details
- Draw: 96 (12Q / 5WC)
- Seeds: 32

Events
Singles	men	women
Doubles	men	women
← 2014 ·	Miami Masters	· 2016 →

Defending champion Novak Djokovic defeated Andy Murray in the final, 7–6^{(7–3)}, 4–6, 6–0 to win the men's singles tennis title at the 2015 Miami Open. Djokovic completed his third Sunshine Double with the win, and claimed his fifth Miami Open title. It was also his second consecutive Sunshine Double.

== Seeds ==
All seeds received a bye into the second round.

1. (Serbia) Novak Djokovic (champion)
2. (Spain) Rafael Nadal (third round)
3. (United Kingdom) Andy Murray (final)
4. (Japan) Kei Nishikori (quarterfinals)
5. (Canada) Milos Raonic (fourth round)
6. (Spain) David Ferrer (quarterfinals)
7. (Switzerland) Stan Wawrinka (third round)
8. (Czech Republic) Tomáš Berdych (semifinals)
9. (Bulgaria) Grigor Dimitrov (third round)
10. (Spain) Feliciano López (second round)
11. (France) Jo-Wilfried Tsonga (third round)
12. (France) Gilles Simon (fourth round)
13. (Spain) Roberto Bautista Agut (second round)
14. (Latvia) Ernests Gulbis (second round)
15. (South Africa) Kevin Anderson (fourth round)
16. (Spain) Tommy Robredo (second round)
17. (France) Gaël Monfils (fourth round, retired with a hip injury)
18. (Belgium) David Goffin (fourth round)
19. (Uruguay) Pablo Cuevas (second round)
20. (Croatia) Ivo Karlović (second round)
21. (Italy) Fabio Fognini (second round)
22. (United States) John Isner (semifinals)
23. (Spain) Guillermo García López (third round)
24. (Argentina) Leonardo Mayer (third round)
25. (Australia) Bernard Tomic (third round)
26. (Czech Republic) Lukáš Rosol (third round)
27. (Colombia) Santiago Giraldo (third round)
28. (France) Adrian Mannarino (fourth round)
29. (Spain) Fernando Verdasco (fourth round)
30. (Luxembourg) Gilles Müller (second round)
31. (France) Jérémy Chardy (third round)
32. (Serbia) Viktor Troicki (third round)

Click on the seed number of a player to go to their draw section.

== Draw ==
=== Key ===
- Q = Qualifier
- WC = Wild card
- LL = Lucky loser
- Alt = Alternate
- SE = Special exempt
- PR = Protected ranking
- ITF = ITF entry
- JE = Junior exempt
- w/o = Walkover
- r = Retired
- d = Defaulted
- SR = Special ranking

=== Finals ===
Quarterfinals
1	(Serbia) Novak Djokovic	7	7
6	(Spain) David Ferrer	5	5
4	(Japan) Kei Nishikori	4	3
22	(United States) John Isner	6	6
(Austria) Dominic Thiem	6	4	1
3	(United Kingdom) Andy Murray	3	6	6
8	(Czech Republic) Tomáš Berdych	6	6
(Argentina) Juan Mónaco	3	4

Semifinals
1	(Serbia) Novak Djokovic	7^{7}	6
22	(United States) John Isner	6^{3}	2
3	(United Kingdom) Andy Murray	6	6
8	(Czech Republic) Tomáš Berdych	4	4

Final
1	(Serbia) Novak Djokovic	7^{7}	4	6
3	(United Kingdom) Andy Murray	6^{3}	6	0

=== Top half ===
==== Section 1 ====
First round
(Italy) P Lorenzi	3	4
(Slovakia) M Kližan	6	6
(Tunisia) M Jaziri	6	5	5
Q	(Belgium) S Darcis	2	7	7
(Australia) L Hewitt	5	7^{7}	4
(Brazil) T Bellucci	7	6^{2}	6
(Lithuania) R Berankis	4	1
(Ukraine) A Dolgopolov	6	6

Second round
1	(Serbia) N Djokovic	6	5	6
(Slovakia) M Kližan	0	7	1
Q	(Belgium) S Darcis	6	6^{2}	6
30	(Luxembourg) G Müller	4	7^{7}	3
19	(Uruguay) P Cuevas	6	2	5
(Brazil) T Bellucci	2	6	7
(Ukraine) A Dolgopolov	6^{1}	6	7
16	(Spain) T Robredo	7^{7}	3	5

Third round
1	(Serbia) N Djokovic	6	7
Q	(Belgium) S Darcis	0	5
(Brazil) T Bellucci	5	4
(Ukraine) A Dolgopolov	7	6

Fourth round
1	(Serbia) N Djokovic	6^{3}	7	6
(Ukraine) A Dolgopolov	7^{7}	5	0

==== Section 2 ====
First round
(Kazakhstan) M Kukushkin	6	3	6
(United States) S Johnson	4	6	2
Q	(Germany) M Berrer	7^{7}	4	4
Q	(Colombia) A Falla	6^{5}	6	6
(Australia) S Groth	5	7^{7}	4
Q	(Germany) A Zverev	7	6^{5}	6
(Czech Republic) J Veselý	6^{4}	6	5
(Argentina) F Delbonis	7^{7}	3	7

Second round
12	(France) G Simon	6	6^{5}	6
(Kazakhstan) M Kukushkin	3	7^{7}	0
Q	(Colombia) A Falla	6	6
20	(Croatia) I Karlović	4	2
26	(Czech Republic) L Rosol	7^{7}	6
Q	(Germany) A Zverev	6^{0}	3
(Argentina) F Delbonis	1	1
6	(Spain) D Ferrer	6	6

Third round
12	(France) G Simon	6	6
Q	(Colombia) A Falla	3	4
26	(Czech Republic) L Rosol	4	5
6	(Spain) D Ferrer	6	7

Fourth round
12	(France) G Simon	6^{5}	0
6	(Spain) D Ferrer	7^{7}	6

==== Section 3 ====
First round
(Kazakhstan) A Golubev	6	2	3
(Russia) M Youzhny	4	6	6
(Cyprus) M Baghdatis	2	2
(Italy) S Bolelli	6	6
(Austria) A Haider-Maurer	6	3	6^{3}
(Croatia) B Ćorić	1	6	7^{7}
(Poland) J Janowicz	6	6
Q	(France) É Roger-Vasselin	4	2

Second round
4	(Japan) K Nishikori	6	6
(Russia) M Youzhny	2	1
(Italy) S Bolelli	5	6	4
32	(Serbia) V Troicki	7	3	6
18	(Belgium) D Goffin	6	6
(Croatia) B Ćorić	0	4
(Poland) J Janowicz	6	1	6
13	(Spain) R Bautista Agut	4	6	4

Third round
4	(Japan) K Nishikori	6	6
32	(Serbia) V Troicki	2	2
18	(Belgium) D Goffin	6	6
(Poland) J Janowicz	4	3

Fourth round
4	(Japan) K Nishikori	6	6
18	(Belgium) D Goffin	1	2

==== Section 4 ====
First round
(Canada) V Pospisil	6	7^{9}
PR	(Argentina) JM del Potro	4	6^{7}
WC	(Russia) A Rublev	1	6	6
(Spain) P Carreño Busta	6	1	4
WC	(United States) R Harrison	6^{3}	3
(Austria) J Melzer	7^{7}	6
(Spain) P Andújar	6	6^{4}	3
(Russia) T Gabashvili	0	7^{7}	6

Second round
9	(Bulgaria) G Dimitrov	6	6
(Canada) V Pospisil	2	2
WC	(Russia) A Rublev	3	4
22	(United States) J Isner	6	6
31	(France) J Chardy	6	6
(Austria) J Melzer	4	1
(Russia) T Gabashvili	1	4
5	(Canada) M Raonic	6	6

Third round
9	(Bulgaria) G Dimitrov	6^{2}	2
22	(United States) J Isner	7^{7}	6
31	(France) J Chardy	1	7	6^{3}
5	(Canada) M Raonic	6	5	7^{7}

Fourth round
22	(United States) J Isner	6^{3}	7^{8}	7^{7}
5	(Canada) M Raonic	7^{7}	6^{6}	6^{5}

=== Bottom half ===
==== Section 5 ====
First round
WC	(Australia) T Kokkinakis	4	6	2
(Argentina) C Berlocq	6	3	6
(Portugal) J Sousa	2	2
(Spain) A Ramos Viñolas	6	6
(Japan) G Soeda	3	4
(United States) J Sock	6	6
(Austria) D Thiem	7^{7}	7
(Argentina) D Schwartzman	6^{0}	5

Second round
7	(Switzerland) S Wawrinka	6^{9}	7	6
(Argentina) C Berlocq	7^{11}	5	2
(Spain) A Ramos Viñolas	4	6	2
28	(France) A Mannarino	6	3	6
21	(Italy) F Fognini	6^{4}	1
(United States) J Sock	7^{7}	6
(Austria) D Thiem	7^{7}	4	6
10	(Spain) F López	6^{4}	6	3

Third round
7	(Switzerland) S Wawrinka	6^{4}	6^{5}
28	(France) A Mannarino	7^{7}	7^{7}
(United States) J Sock	4	3
(Austria) D Thiem	6	6

Fourth round
28	(France) A Mannarino	6^{5}	6	5
(Austria) D Thiem	7^{7}	4	7

==== Section 6 ====
First round
(Dominican Republic) V Estrella Burgos	4	3
(United States) S Querrey	6	6
(Finland) J Nieminen	6	6
(Australia) M Matosevic	3	3
WC	(United Kingdom) K Edmund	2	2
Q	(Netherlands) R Haase	6	6
(United States) D Young	5
(Chinese Taipei) Y-h Lu	1^{r}

Second round
15	(South Africa) K Anderson	6^{5}	7^{7}	6
(United States) S Querrey	7^{7}	6^{3}	4
(Finland) J Nieminen	4	6^{5}
24	(Argentina) L Mayer	6	7^{7}
27	(Colombia) S Giraldo	6	3	6
Q	(Netherlands) R Haase	2	6	0
(United States) D Young	4	2
3	(United Kingdom) A Murray	6	6

Third round
15	(South Africa) K Anderson	6	6
24	(Argentina) L Mayer	4	4
27	(Colombia) S Giraldo	3	4
3	(United Kingdom) A Murray	6	6

Fourth round
15	(South Africa) K Anderson	4	6	3
3	(United Kingdom) A Murray	6	3	6

==== Section 7 ====
First round
(Spain) M Granollers	0	6	4
WC	(South Korea) H Chung	6	4	6
(Uzbekistan) D Istomin	4	4
Q	(United States) A Krajicek	6	6
Q	(Serbia) F Krajinović	2	7^{7}	4
(Serbia) D Lajović	6	6^{5}	2^{r}
(United States) T Smyczek	4	6	6
Q	(Spain) A Menéndez Maceiras	6	3	4

Second round
8	(Czech Republic) T Berdych	6	6
WC	(South Korea) H Chung	3	4
Q	(United States) A Krajicek	6^{6}	5
25	(Australia) B Tomic	7^{8}	7
17	(France) G Monfils	3	6	7^{7}
Q	(Serbia) F Krajinović	6	2	6^{4}
(United States) T Smyczek	4	6	3
11	(France) J-W Tsonga	6	3	6

Third round
8	(Czech Republic) T Berdych	6^{4}	7^{7}	6
25	(Australia) B Tomic	7^{7}	6^{3}	1
17	(France) G Monfils	6	7^{7}
11	(France) J-W Tsonga	4	6^{4}

Fourth round
8	(Czech Republic) T Berdych	6	3
17	(France) G Monfils	3	2^{r}

==== Section 8 ====
First round
Q	(Belgium) R Bemelmans	5	7^{7}	4
(Argentina) J Mónaco	7	6^{4}	6
(Germany) J-L Struff	3	7^{12}	6
(Germany) B Becker	6	6^{10}	4
Q	(Bosnia and Herzegovina) D Džumhur	3	6	3
Q	(Australia) J Duckworth	6	3	6
(Ukraine) S Stakhovsky	3	7^{7}	4
PR	(Spain) N Almagro	6	6^{3}	6

Second round
14	(Latvia) E Gulbis	2	4
(Argentina) J Mónaco	6	6
(Germany) J-L Struff	4	4
23	(Spain) G García López	6	6
29	(Spain) F Verdasco	4	6	6
Q	(Australia) J Duckworth	6	2	1
PR	(Spain) N Almagro	4	2
2	(Spain) R Nadal	6	6

Third round
(Argentina) J Mónaco	7	6
23	(Spain) G García López	5	4
29	(Spain) F Verdasco	6	2	6
2	(Spain) R Nadal	4	6	3

Fourth round
(Argentina) J Mónaco	6	6
29	(Spain) F Verdasco	3	3

== Qualifying ==
=== Seeds ===
1. (Brazil) João Souza (first round)
2. (Japan) Tatsuma Ito (first round)
3. (France) Benoît Paire (qualifying competition)
4. (Belgium) Steve Darcis (qualified)
5. (Bosnia and Herzegovina) Damir Džumhur (qualified)
6. (Colombia) Alejandro González (qualifying competition)
7. (Spain) Daniel Gimeno Traver (first round)
8. (Slovakia) Lukáš Lacko (qualifying competition)
9. (Germany) Tobias Kamke (first round)
10. (Argentina) Máximo González (first round)
11. (Germany) Dustin Brown (qualifying competition)
12. (Serbia) Filip Krajinović (qualified)
13. (Netherlands) Robin Haase (qualified)
14. (Australia) James Duckworth (qualified)
15. (France) Paul-Henri Mathieu (first round)
16. (United Kingdom) James Ward (first round)
17. (Germany) Andreas Beck (first round)
18. (Italy) Luca Vanni (first round)
19. (Slovenia) Aljaž Bedene (first round)
20. (Slovakia) Norbert Gombos (qualifying competition)
21. (Colombia) Alejandro Falla (qualified)
22. (France) Kenny de Schepper (qualifying competition)
23. (Argentina) Facundo Bagnis (first round)
24. (Netherlands) Thiemo de Bakker (qualifying competition)

=== Qualifiers ===
1. (Germany) Alexander Zverev
2. (Germany) Michael Berrer
3. (Colombia) Alejandro Falla
4. (Belgium) Steve Darcis
5. (Bosnia and Herzegovina) Damir Džumhur
6. (Australia) James Duckworth
7. (United States) Austin Krajicek
8. (Netherlands) Robin Haase
9. (Spain) Adrián Menéndez Maceiras
10. (France) Édouard Roger-Vasselin
11. (Belgium) Ruben Bemelmans
12. (Serbia) Filip Krajinović

=== Qualifying draw ===
==== First qualifier ====
First round
1	(Brazil) João Souza	3	5
(Germany) Alexander Zverev	6	7
WC	(Italy) Gianluigi Quinzi	4	6	2
24	(Netherlands) Thiemo de Bakker	6	4	6

Qualifying competition
(Germany) Alexander Zverev	6^{2}	6	6
24	(Netherlands) Thiemo de Bakker	7^{7}	4	3

==== Second qualifier ====
First round
2	(Japan) Tatsuma Ito	3	7^{7}	3
(Germany) Michael Berrer	6	6^{5}	6
(Argentina) Horacio Zeballos	5	7^{7}	6^{4}
22	(France) Kenny de Schepper	7	6^{3}	7^{7}

Qualifying competition
(Germany) Michael Berrer	6	4	7^{7}
22	(France) Kenny de Schepper	3	6	6^{3}

==== Third qualifier ====
First round
3	(France) Benoît Paire	4	6	6
(Austria) Gerald Melzer	6	1	4
WC	(United States) Michael Mmoh	2	1
21	(Colombia) Alejandro Falla	6	6

Qualifying competition
3	(France) Benoît Paire	1	4
21	(Colombia) Alejandro Falla	6	6

==== Fourth qualifier ====
First round
4	(Belgium) Steve Darcis	7	7^{7}
(Italy) Marco Cecchinato	5	6^{4}
(France) Nicolas Mahut	6^{3}	3
20	(Slovakia) Norbert Gombos	7^{7}	6

Qualifying competition
4	(Belgium) Steve Darcis	6	6
20	(Slovakia) Norbert Gombos	4	3

==== Fifth qualifier ====
First round
5	(Bosnia and Herzegovina) Damir Džumhur	6	6
(Japan) Yoshihito Nishioka	3	2
(Croatia) Mate Delić	7^{7}	7^{7}
18	(Italy) Luca Vanni	6^{5}	6^{3}

Qualifying competition
5	(Bosnia and Herzegovina) Damir Džumhur	6	6
(Croatia) Mate Delić	4	2

==== Sixth qualifier ====
First round
6	(Colombia) Alejandro González	6	1	7
(Australia) Luke Saville	4	6	5
(Romania) Victor Hănescu	1	2
14	(Australia) James Duckworth	6	6

Qualifying competition
6	(Colombia) Alejandro González	2	6^{5}
14	(Australia) James Duckworth	6	7^{7}

==== Seventh qualifier ====
First round
7	(Spain) Daniel Gimeno Traver	3	4
WC	(Sweden) Elias Ymer	6	6
(United States) Austin Krajicek	7^{7}	7^{7}
15	(France) Paul-Henri Mathieu	6^{5}	6^{3}

Qualifying competition
WC	(Sweden) Elias Ymer	6	4	3
(United States) Austin Krajicek	3	6	6

==== Eighth qualifier ====
First round
8	(Slovakia) Lukáš Lacko	6^{2}	6	7
(United States) Denis Kudla	7^{7}	4	5
(Argentina) Facundo Argüello	6	3	2
13	(Netherlands) Robin Haase	1	6	6

Qualifying competition
8	(Slovakia) Lukáš Lacko	5	4
13	(Netherlands) Robin Haase	7	6

==== Ninth qualifier ====
First round
9	(Germany) Tobias Kamke	7^{9}	3	3
(Spain) Adrián Menéndez Maceiras	6^{7}	6	6
WC	(Japan) Taro Daniel	0	6	6
23	(Argentina) Facundo Bagnis	6	3	2

Qualifying competition
(Spain) Adrián Menéndez Maceiras	1	6	6
WC	(Japan) Taro Daniel	6	3	3

==== Tenth qualifier ====
First round
10	(Argentina) Máximo González	4	4
(France) Édouard Roger-Vasselin	6	6
(United States) Chase Buchanan	6	6
16	(United Kingdom) James Ward	4	2

Qualifying competition
(France) Édouard Roger-Vasselin	6	6
(United States) Chase Buchanan	2	3

==== Eleventh qualifier ====
First round
11	(Germany) Dustin Brown	6	6^{6}	6
(United States) Rajeev Ram	2	7^{8}	3
(Belgium) Ruben Bemelmans	7^{7}	6
17	(Germany) Andreas Beck	6^{3}	3

Qualifying competition
11	(Germany) Dustin Brown	7^{7}	4	2
(Belgium) Ruben Bemelmans	6^{5}	6	6

==== Twelfth qualifier ====
First round
12	(Serbia) Filip Krajinović	6	7^{7}
(Australia) Alex Bolt	2	6^{2}
WC	(Australia) Omar Jasika	6^{5}	6	6
19	(Slovenia) Aljaž Bedene	7^{7}	4	4

Qualifying competition
12	(Serbia) Filip Krajinović	6	4	6
WC	(Australia) Omar Jasika	4	6	3
