= 2016 Italian Open – Men's doubles =

Men's doubles
- 2016 Italian Open

Final
- Champions: (United States) Bob Bryan (United States) Mike Bryan
- Runners-up: (Canada) Vasek Pospisil (United States) Jack Sock
- Score: 2–6, 6–3, [10–7]

Events
Singles	men	women
Doubles	men	women
← 2015 ·	Italian Open	· 2017 →

Bob and Mike Bryan won the title, defeating Vasek Pospisil and Jack Sock in the final, 2–6, 6–3, [10–7]. They saved three match points in their opening match against Steve Johnson and Sam Querrey.

Pablo Cuevas and David Marrero were the defending champions, but Marrero chose not to participate this year. Cuevas played alongside Marcel Granollers, losing in the quarterfinals to Pospisil and Sock.

== Seeds ==
All seeds receive a bye into the second round.

1. (France) Pierre-Hugues Herbert / (France) Nicolas Mahut (withdrew)
2. (Croatia) Ivan Dodig / (Brazil) Marcelo Melo (second round)
3. (Netherlands) Jean-Julien Rojer / (Romania) Horia Tecău (second round)
4. (United Kingdom) Jamie Murray / (Brazil) Bruno Soares (quarterfinals)
5. (United States) Bob Bryan / (United States) Mike Bryan (champions)
6. (India) Rohan Bopanna / (Romania) Florin Mergea (semifinals)
7. (Austria) Alexander Peya / (Serbia) Nenad Zimonjić (second round)
8. (Canada) Vasek Pospisil / (United States) Jack Sock (final)

== Draw ==
Key

- Q = Qualifier
- WC = Wild card
- LL = Lucky loser
- Alt = Alternate
- ITF = ITF entry
- PR = Protected ranking
- SR = Special ranking
- SE = Special exempt
- JE = Junior exempt
- JR = Junior Accelerator Programme entrant
- CO = College Accelerator Programme entrant
- NG = Next Gen Accelerator Program entrant
- w/o = Walkover
- r = Retired
- d = Defaulted

=== Finals ===
Semifinals
PR	(France) Julien Benneteau (France) Édouard Roger-Vasselin	7^{7}	2	[7]
5	(United States) Bob Bryan (United States) Mike Bryan	6^{5}	6	[10]
8	(Canada) Vasek Pospisil (United States) Jack Sock	7^{7}	7^{7}
6	(India) Rohan Bopanna (Romania) Florin Mergea	6^{4}	6^{2}

Final
5	(United States) Bob Bryan (United States) Mike Bryan	2	6	[10]
8	(Canada) Vasek Pospisil (United States) Jack Sock	6	3	[7]

=== Top half ===
First round
(Austria) O Marach (Poland) M Matkowski	4	7	[10]
WC	(Italy) F Fognini (Italy) A Seppi	6	5	[6]
(South Africa) R Klaasen (United States) R Ram	4	0
PR	(France) J Benneteau (France) É Roger-Vasselin	6	6
(Spain) F López (Spain) M López	3	6	[6]
(Austria) D Thiem (Germany) A Zverev	6	3	[10]
(Canada) D Nestor (Czech Republic) R Štěpánek	3	3
(United States) S Johnson (United States) S Querrey	6	6

Second round
Alt	(United Kingdom) D Inglot (France) F Martin	6^{2}	3
(Austria) O Marach (Poland) M Matkowski	7^{7}	6
PR	(France) J Benneteau (France) É Roger-Vasselin	6	1	[10]
7	(Austria) A Peya (Serbia) N Zimonjić	4	6	[8]
4	(United Kingdom) J Murray (Brazil) B Soares	6	7^{10}
(Austria) D Thiem (Germany) A Zverev	1	6^{8}
(United States) S Johnson (United States) S Querrey	6	3	[11]
5	(United States) B Bryan (United States) M Bryan	4	6	[13]

Quarterfinals
(Austria) O Marach (Poland) M Matkowski	6	5	[8]
PR	(France) J Benneteau (France) É Roger-Vasselin	4	7	[10]
4	(United Kingdom) J Murray (Brazil) B Soares	3	4
5	(United States) B Bryan (United States) M Bryan	6	6

Semifinals
PR	(France) J Benneteau (France) É Roger-Vasselin	7^{7}	2	[7]
5	(United States) B Bryan (United States) M Bryan	6^{5}	6	[10]

=== Bottom half ===
First round
(South Africa) K Anderson (France) J Chardy	3	1^{r}
(Philippines) T Huey (Belarus) M Mirnyi	6	1
(Uruguay) P Cuevas (Spain) M Granollers	6	6
(Colombia) JS Cabal (Colombia) R Farah	3	4
WC	(Italy) A Arnaboldi (Italy) A Giannessi	4	3
(France) B Paire (Portugal) J Sousa	6	6
(Finland) H Kontinen (Australia) J Peers	4	6	[13]
(Germany) P Kohlschreiber (Serbia) V Troicki	6	1	[15]

Second round
8	(Canada) V Pospisil (United States) J Sock	7^{8}	6
(Philippines) T Huey (Belarus) M Mirnyi	6^{6}	4
(Uruguay) P Cuevas (Spain) M Granollers	6	7^{9}
3	(Netherlands) J-J Rojer (Romania) H Tecău	2	6^{7}
6	(India) R Bopanna (Romania) F Mergea	6^{5}	6	[10]
(France) B Paire (Portugal) J Sousa	7^{7}	4	[8]
(Germany) P Kohlschreiber (Serbia) V Troicki	3	7^{7}	[14]
2	(Croatia) I Dodig (Brazil) M Melo	6	6^{3}	[12]

Quarterfinals
8	(Canada) V Pospisil (United States) J Sock	6	7^{7}
(Uruguay) P Cuevas (Spain) M Granollers	4	6^{4}
6	(India) R Bopanna (Romania) F Mergea	6	6
(Germany) P Kohlschreiber (Serbia) V Troicki	3	4

Semifinals
8	(Canada) V Pospisil (United States) J Sock	7^{7}	7^{7}
6	(India) R Bopanna (Romania) F Mergea	6^{4}	6^{2}
