= 2015 Miami Open – Men's doubles =

Men's doubles
- 2015 Miami Open

Final
- Champions: (United States) Bob Bryan (United States) Mike Bryan
- Runners-up: (Canada) Vasek Pospisil (United States) Jack Sock
- Score: 6–3, 1–6, [10–8]

Details
- Draw: 32
- Seeds: 8

Events
Singles	men	women
Doubles	men	women
- Miami Open

Bob Bryan and Mike Bryan were the defending champions and successfully defended their title, defeating Vasek Pospisil and Jack Sock in the final, 6–3, 1–6, [10–8].

== Seeds ==
1. (United States) Bob Bryan / (United States) Mike Bryan (champions)
2. (Canada) Vasek Pospisil / (United States) Jack Sock (final)
3. (Brazil) Marcelo Melo / (Brazil) Bruno Soares (semifinals)
4. (Netherlands) Jean-Julien Rojer / (Romania) Horia Tecău (quarterfinals)
5. (Spain) Marcel Granollers / (Spain) Marc López (first round, retired)
6. (Poland) Marcin Matkowski / (Serbia) Nenad Zimonjić (first round)
7. (France) Nicolas Mahut / (France) Édouard Roger-Vasselin (second round)
8. (India) Rohan Bopanna / (Canada) Daniel Nestor (first round)

== Draw ==
Key

- Q = Qualifier
- WC = Wild card
- LL = Lucky loser
- Alt = Alternate
- ITF = ITF entry
- PR = Protected ranking
- SR = Special ranking
- SE = Special exempt
- JE = Junior exempt
- JR = Junior Accelerator Programme entrant
- CO = College Accelerator Programme entrant
- NG = Next Gen Accelerator Program entrant
- w/o = Walkover
- r = Retired
- d = Defaulted

=== Finals ===
Semifinals
1	(United States) Bob Bryan (United States) Mike Bryan	7^{7}	7
(United States) John Isner (United States) Sam Querrey	6^{5}	5
3	(Brazil) Marcelo Melo (Brazil) Bruno Soares	4	6	[7]
2	(Canada) Vasek Pospisil (United States) Jack Sock	6	3	[10]

Final
1	(United States) Bob Bryan (United States) Mike Bryan	6	1	[10]
2	(Canada) Vasek Pospisil (United States) Jack Sock	3	6	[8]

=== Top half ===
First round
1	(United States) B Bryan (United States) M Bryan	6	7^{7}
(Germany) B Becker (United States) S Lipsky	2	6^{3}
(Sweden) R Lindstedt (Austria) J Melzer	6	3	[10]
PR	(Serbia) N Djokovic (Serbia) J Tipsarević	4	6	[7]
PR	(Spain) N Almagro (Spain) G García López	6	6
(France) A Mannarino (France) G Simon	3	2
(South Africa) K Anderson (France) J Chardy	6	6
6	(Poland) M Matkowski (Serbia) N Zimonjić	3	3
4	(Netherlands) J-J Rojer (Romania) H Tecău	6	6
(United Kingdom) D Inglot (Romania) F Mergea	4	2
(Colombia) JS Cabal (Colombia) R Farah	7^{7}	6
(Spain) F López (Belarus) M Mirnyi	6^{4}	3
(Germany) A Begemann (Latvia) E Gulbis	1	6	[10]
(Uruguay) P Cuevas (Spain) D Marrero	6	4	[7]
(United States) J Isner (United States) S Querrey	6	7^{7}
8	(India) R Bopanna (Canada) D Nestor	3	6^{4}

Second round
1	(United States) B Bryan (United States) M Bryan	6	6
(Sweden) R Lindstedt (Austria) J Melzer	1	2
PR	(Spain) N Almagro (Spain) G García López	1	2
(South Africa) K Anderson (France) J Chardy	6	6
4	(Netherlands) J-J Rojer (Romania) H Tecău	6^{6}	6	[10]
(Colombia) JS Cabal (Colombia) R Farah	7^{8}	3	[2]
(Germany) A Begemann (Latvia) E Gulbis	2	6^{4}
(United States) J Isner (United States) S Querrey	6	7^{7}

Quarterfinals
1	(United States) B Bryan (United States) M Bryan	6	4	[10]
(South Africa) K Anderson (France) J Chardy	4	6	[6]
4	(Netherlands) J-J Rojer (Romania) H Tecău	3	4
(United States) J Isner (United States) S Querrey	6	6

Semifinals
1	(United States) B Bryan (United States) M Bryan	7^{7}	7
(United States) J Isner (United States) S Querrey	6^{5}	5

=== Bottom half ===
First round
7	(France) N Mahut (France) É Roger-Vasselin	6	0
(Spain) R Bautista Agut (Serbia) V Troicki	3	1^{r}
(United States) E Butorac (Australia) S Groth	6	4	[4]
WC	(United States) R Harrison (United States) R Ram	1	6	[10]
(Czech Republic) L Rosol (Austria) D Thiem	3	2
(United Kingdom) J Murray (Australia) J Peers	6	6
(Colombia) S Giraldo (Slovakia) M Kližan	5	3
3	(Brazil) M Melo (Brazil) B Soares	7	6
5	(Spain) M Granollers (Spain) M López	1^{r}
WC	(Brazil) T Bellucci (Brazil) J Souza	2
(Croatia) M Draganja (Finland) H Kontinen	4	6	[10]
(France) G Monfils (France) J-W Tsonga	6	3	[5]
(Italy) S Bolelli (Italy) F Fognini	6	6
(South Africa) R Klaasen (India) L Paes	4	2
(Argentina) L Mayer (Luxembourg) G Müller	2	4
2	(Canada) V Pospisil (United States) J Sock	6	6

Second round
7	(France) N Mahut (France) É Roger-Vasselin	5	6^{4}
WC	(United States) R Harrison (United States) R Ram	7	7^{7}
(United Kingdom) J Murray (Australia) J Peers	5	6	[7]
3	(Brazil) M Melo (Brazil) B Soares	7	4	[10]
WC	(Brazil) T Bellucci (Brazil) J Souza	3	3
(Croatia) M Draganja (Finland) H Kontinen	6	6
(Italy) S Bolelli (Italy) F Fognini	2	3
2	(Canada) V Pospisil (United States) J Sock	6	6

Quarterfinals
WC	(United States) R Harrison (United States) R Ram	4	7	[8]
3	(Brazil) M Melo (Brazil) B Soares	6	5	[10]
(Croatia) M Draganja (Finland) H Kontinen	4	7^{7}	5
2	(Canada) V Pospisil (United States) J Sock	6	6^{4}	[10]

Semifinals
3	(Brazil) M Melo (Brazil) B Soares	4	6	[7]
2	(Canada) V Pospisil (United States) J Sock	6	3	[10]
