= 2015 BNP Paribas Open – Men's doubles =

Men's doubles
- 2015 BNP Paribas Open

Final
- Champions: (Canada) Vasek Pospisil (United States) Jack Sock
- Runners-up: (Italy) Simone Bolelli (Italy) Fabio Fognini
- Score: 6–4, 6–7^{(3–7)}, [10–7]

Events
Singles	men	women
Doubles	men	women
← 2014 ·	BNP Paribas Open	· 2016 →

Bob Bryan and Mike Bryan were the two-time defending champions, but lost in the quarterfinals to Vasek Pospisil and Jack Sock.
Pospisil and Sock went on to win the title, defeating Simone Bolelli and Fabio Fognini in the final, 6–4, 6–7^{(3–7)}, [10–7].

== Seeds ==
1. (United States) Bob Bryan / (United States) Mike Bryan (quarterfinals)
2. (Croatia) Ivan Dodig / (Brazil) Marcelo Melo (semifinals)
3. (France) Julien Benneteau / (France) Édouard Roger-Vasselin (first round)
4. (Netherlands) Jean-Julien Rojer / (Romania) Horia Tecău (first round)
5. (Austria) Alexander Peya / (Brazil) Bruno Soares (first round)
6. (Spain) Marcel Granollers / (Spain) Marc López (second round)
7. (India) Rohan Bopanna / (Canada) Daniel Nestor (second round)
8. (Canada) Vasek Pospisil / (United States) Jack Sock (champions)

== Draw ==
=== Key ===
- Q = Qualifier
- WC = Wild card
- LL = Lucky loser
- Alt = Alternate
- SE = Special exempt
- PR = Protected ranking
- ITF = ITF entry
- JE = Junior exempt
- w/o = Walkover
- r = Retired
- d = Defaulted
- SR = Special ranking

=== Finals ===
Semifinals
8	(Canada) Vasek Pospisil (United States) Jack Sock	6	3	[10]
(Poland) Marcin Matkowski (Serbia) Nenad Zimonjić	4	6	[6]
(Italy) Simone Bolelli (Italy) Fabio Fognini	6	6
2	(Croatia) Ivan Dodig (Brazil) Marcelo Melo	4	3

Final
8	(Canada) Vasek Pospisil (United States) Jack Sock	6	6^{3}	[10]
(Italy) Simone Bolelli (Italy) Fabio Fognini	4	7^{7}	[7]

=== Top half ===
First round
1	(United States) B Bryan (United States) M Bryan	6	6
(South Africa) K Anderson (Austria) J Melzer	3	3
(Croatia) M Draganja (Australia) J Peers	4	6	[10]
(Spain) G García-López (Mexico) S González	6	2	[6]
Alt	(Colombia) S Giraldo (Czech Republic) L Rosol	3	4
(Germany) A Begemann (Latvia) E Gulbis	6	6
(Australia) S Groth (Spain) F López	6^{11}	1
8	(Canada) V Pospisil (United States) J Sock	7^{13}	6
4	(Netherlands) J-J Rojer (Romania) H Tecău	3	5
WC	(Australia) T Kokkinakis (United Kingdom) A Murray	6	7
(Poland) M Matkowski (Serbia) N Zimonjić	6	3	[11]
WC	(Switzerland) R Federer (Switzerland) M Lammer	3	6	[9]
(United Kingdom) D Inglot (Romania) F Mergea	6	6
(Spain) T Robredo (Serbia) V Troicki	3	2
(Colombia) JS Cabal (Colombia) R Farah	6	3	[10]
5	(Austria) A Peya (Brazil) B Soares	2	6	[8]

Second round
1	(United States) B Bryan (United States) M Bryan	6^{6}	6	[10]
(Croatia) M Draganja (Australia) J Peers	7^{8}	4	[7]
(Germany) A Begemann (Latvia) E Gulbis	6^{4}	2
8	(Canada) V Pospisil (United States) J Sock	7^{7}	6
WC	(Australia) T Kokkinakis (United Kingdom) A Murray	1	4
(Poland) M Matkowski (Serbia) N Zimonjić	6	6
(United Kingdom) D Inglot (Romania) F Mergea	6	6
(Colombia) JS Cabal (Colombia) R Farah	3	4

Quarterfinals
1	(United States) B Bryan (United States) M Bryan	4	4
8	(Canada) V Pospisil (United States) J Sock	6	6
(Poland) M Matkowski (Serbia) N Zimonjić	4	6	[10]
(United Kingdom) D Inglot (Romania) F Mergea	6	3	[3]

Semifinals
8	(Canada) V Pospisil (United States) J Sock	6	3	[10]
(Poland) M Matkowski (Serbia) N Zimonjić	4	6	[6]

=== Bottom half ===
First round
6	(Spain) M Granollers (Spain) M López	6	6
(France) A Mannarino (France) G Simon	2	1
(Spain) P Carreño Busta (Spain) R Nadal	6	6
(Uruguay) P Cuevas (Spain) D Marrero	2	1
(Pakistan) A-u-H Qureshi (Canada) M Raonic	6^{3}	3
(South Africa) R Klaasen (India) L Paes	7^{7}	6
(Italy) S Bolelli (Italy) F Fognini	6	6
3	(France) J Benneteau (France) É Roger-Vasselin	2	3
7	(India) R Bopanna (Canada) D Nestor	7^{7}	6
(France) J Chardy (France) R Gasquet	6^{5}	4
PR	(Bulgaria) G Dimitrov (United States) M Fish	3	4
(Spain) D Ferrer (Spain) F Verdasco	6	6
(Spain) R Bautista Agut (Finland) H Kontinen	7^{7}	4	[6]
(United States) J Isner (United States) S Querrey	6^{4}	6	[10]
(Poland) Ł Kubot (Switzerland) S Wawrinka	6^{1}	2
2	(Croatia) I Dodig (Brazil) M Melo	7^{7}	6

Second round
6	(Spain) M Granollers (Spain) M López	4	4
(Spain) P Carreño Busta (Spain) R Nadal	6	6
(South Africa) R Klaasen (India) L Paes	4	6	[2]
(Italy) S Bolelli (Italy) F Fognini	6	4	[10]
7	(India) R Bopanna (Canada) D Nestor	4	6^{3}
(Spain) D Ferrer (Spain) F Verdasco	6	7^{7}
(United States) J Isner (United States) S Querrey	6	4	[8]
2	(Croatia) I Dodig (Brazil) M Melo	2	6	[10]

Quarterfinals
(Spain) P Carreño Busta (Spain) R Nadal	1	6	[4]
(Italy) S Bolelli (Italy) F Fognini	6	3	[10]
(Spain) D Ferrer (Spain) F Verdasco	5	6	[7]
2	(Croatia) I Dodig (Brazil) M Melo	7	3	[10]

Semifinals
(Italy) S Bolelli (Italy) F Fognini	6	6
2	(Croatia) I Dodig (Brazil) M Melo	4	3
