= 2017 BNP Paribas Open =

- Date: March 6–19
- Edition: 44th (ATP) / 29th (WTA)
- Category: ATP World Tour Masters 1000 (Men); WTA Premier Mandatory (Women)
- Draw: 96S / 32D
- Prize money: $6,993,450 (ATP) $7,669,423 (WTA)
- Surface: Hard
- Location: Indian Wells, California, United States
- Venue: Indian Wells Tennis Garden

Champions

Men's singles
- (Switzerland) Roger Federer

Women's singles
- (Russia) Elena Vesnina

Men's doubles
- (South Africa) Raven Klaasen / (United States) Rajeev Ram

Women's doubles
- (Chinese Taipei) Chan Yung-jan / (Switzerland) Martina Hingis
← 2016 ·	Indian Wells Open	· 2018 →

The 2017 BNP Paribas Open (also known as the 2017 Indian Wells Open) was a professional tennis tournament played at Indian Wells, California in the United States. It was the 44th edition of the men's event and 29th of the women's event, and was classified as an ATP World Tour Masters 1000 event on the 2017 ATP World Tour and a Premier Mandatory event on the 2017 WTA Tour. Both the men's and the women's events took place at the Indian Wells Tennis Garden in Indian Wells, California, from March 6 through March 19, 2017, on outdoor hard courts.

== Finals ==
=== Men's singles ===
- (Switzerland) Roger Federer defeated (Switzerland) Stan Wawrinka, 6–4, 7–5

=== Women's singles ===
- (Russia) Elena Vesnina defeated (Russia) Svetlana Kuznetsova, 6−7^{(6−8)}, 7−5, 6−4

=== Men's doubles ===
- (South Africa) Raven Klaasen / (United States) Rajeev Ram defeated (Poland) Łukasz Kubot / (Brazil) Marcelo Melo, 6–7^{(1–7)}, 6–4, [10–8]

=== Women's doubles ===
- (Chinese Taipei) Chan Yung-jan / (Switzerland) Martina Hingis defeated (Czech Republic) Lucie Hradecká / (Czech Republic) Kateřina Siniaková, 7–6^{(7–4)}, 6–2

== Points and prize money ==
=== Point distribution ===
Event	W	F	SF	QF	Round of 16	Round of 32	Round of 64	Round of 128	Q	Q2	Q1
Men's singles	1000	600	360	180	90	45	25*	10	16	8	0
Men's doubles	1000	600	360	180	90	0	—	—	—	—	—
Women's singles	1000	650	390	215	120	65	35*	10	30	20	2
Women's doubles	1000	650	390	215	120	10	—	—	—	—	—

- Players with byes receive first-round points.

=== Prize money ===
Event	W	F	SF	QF	Round of 16	Round of 32	Round of 64	Round of 128	Q2	Q1
Men's singles	$1,175,505	$573,680	$287,515	$146,575	$77,265	$41,350	$22,325	$13,690	$4,075	$2,085
Women's singles	$1,175,505	$573,680	$287,515	$146,575	$77,265	$41,350	$22,325	$13,690	$4,075	$2,085
Men's doubles	$385,170	$187,970	$94,220	$48,010	$25,320	$13,550	—	—	—	—
Women's doubles	$385,170	$187,970	$94,220	$48,010	$25,320	$13,550	—	—	—	—

== ATP singles main-draw entrants ==
=== Seeds ===
The following are the seeded players. Rankings and seedings are based on ATP rankings as of March 6, 2017.

Seed	Rank	Player	Points before	Points defending	Points won	Points after	Status
1	1	(United Kingdom) Andy Murray	12,040	45	10	12,005	Second round lost to (Canada) Vasek Pospisil [Q]
2	2	(Serbia) Novak Djokovic	9,825	1,000	90	8,915	Fourth round lost to (Australia) Nick Kyrgios [15]
3	3	(Switzerland) Stan Wawrinka	5,195	90	600	5,705	Runner-up, lost to (Switzerland) Roger Federer [9]
4	5	(Japan) Kei Nishikori	4,730	180	180	4,730	Quarterfinals lost to (United States) Jack Sock [17]
5	6	(Spain) Rafael Nadal	4,415	360	90	4,145	Fourth round lost to (Switzerland) Roger Federer [9]
6	7	(Croatia) Marin Čilić	3,590	180	10	3,420	Second round lost to (United States) Taylor Fritz [WC]
7	8	(France) Jo-Wilfried Tsonga	3,480	180	10	3,310	Second round lost to (Italy) Fabio Fognini
8	9	(Austria) Dominic Thiem	3,375	90	180	3,465	Quarterfinals lost to (Switzerland) Stan Wawrinka [3]
9	10	(Switzerland) Roger Federer	3,305	0	1,000	4,305	Champion, defeated (Switzerland) Stan Wawrinka [3]
10	11	(France) Gaël Monfils	3,280	180	90	3,190	Fourth round lost to (Austria) Dominic Thiem [8]
11	12	(Belgium) David Goffin	3,245	360	90	2,975	Fourth round lost to (Uruguay) Pablo Cuevas [27]
12	13	(Bulgaria) Grigor Dimitrov	2,925	10	45	2,960	Third round lost to (United States) Jack Sock [17]
13	14	(Czech Republic) Tomáš Berdych	2,835	90	45	2,790	Third round lost to (Japan) Yoshihito Nishioka [LL]
14	15	(France) Lucas Pouille	2,421	10	45	2,456	Third round lost to (United States) Donald Young
15	16	(Australia) Nick Kyrgios	2,255	10	180	2,425	Quarterfinals withdrew due to illness
16	17	(Spain) Roberto Bautista Agut	2,190	45	45	2,190	Third round withdrew due to abdominal injury
17	18	(United States) Jack Sock	2,060	45	360	2,375	Semifinals lost to (Switzerland) Roger Federer [9]
18	20	(Germany) Alexander Zverev	1,895	90	45	1,850	Third round lost to (Australia) Nick Kyrgios [15]
19	21	(Croatia) Ivo Karlović	1,875	45	10	1,840	Second round lost to (Japan) Yoshihito Nishioka [LL]
20	22	(United States) John Isner	1,760	90	45	1,715	Third round lost to (France) Gaël Monfils [10]
21	23	(Spain) Pablo Carreño Busta	1,690	25	360	2,025	Semifinals lost to (Switzerland) Stan Wawrinka [3]
22	24	(Spain) Albert Ramos Viñolas	1,640	45	45	1,640	Third round lost to (Belgium) David Goffin [11]
23	26	(United States) Sam Querrey	1,480	45	10	1,445	Second round lost to (United States) Donald Young
24	27	(United States) Steve Johnson	1,415	45	45	1,415	Third round lost to (Switzerland) Roger Federer [9]
25	28	(Luxembourg) Gilles Müller	1,370	25	45	1,390	Third round lost to (Japan) Kei Nishikori [4]
26	29	(Spain) Fernando Verdasco	1,325	45	45	1,325	Third round lost to (Spain) Rafael Nadal [5]
27	30	(Uruguay) Pablo Cuevas	1,290	10	180	1,460	Quarterfinals lost to (Spain) Pablo Carreño Busta [21]
28	31	(Germany) Philipp Kohlschreiber	1,270	45	45	1,270	Third round lost to (Switzerland) Stan Wawrinka [3]
29	33	(Germany) Mischa Zverev	1,216	10	45	1,251	Third round lost to (Austria) Dominic Thiem [8]
30	34	(Spain) Feliciano López	1,170	90	10	1,090	Second round lost to (Serbia) Dušan Lajović [Q]
31	35	(Argentina) Juan Martín del Potro	1,155	25	45	1,175	Third round lost to (Serbia) Novak Djokovic [2]
32	36	(Spain) Marcel Granollers	1,113	150	10	973	Second round lost to (Tunisia) Malek Jaziri

=== Other entrants ===
The following players received wildcards into the singles main draw:

- (United States) Bjorn Fratangelo
- (United States) Taylor Fritz
- (United States) Stefan Kozlov
- (United States) Reilly Opelka
- (United States) Frances Tiafoe

The following players received entry using a protected ranking:

- (Spain) Tommy Robredo
- (Russia) ~~Dmitry Tursunov~~

The following players received entry from the qualifying draw:

- (Moldova) Radu Albot
- (Georgia (country)) Nikoloz Basilashvili
- (France) Julien Benneteau
- (Romania) Marius Copil
- (Italy) Federico Gaio
- (Colombia) Santiago Giraldo
- (Germany) Peter Gojowczyk
- (Barbados) Darian King
- (Switzerland) Henri Laaksonen
- (Serbia) Dušan Lajović
- (Canada) Vasek Pospisil
- (Sweden) Elias Ymer

The following players received entry as lucky losers:

- (Kazakhstan) Mikhail Kukushkin
- (Japan) Yoshihito Nishioka

=== Withdrawals ===
Before the tournament

- (Spain) Nicolás Almagro → replaced by (South Africa) Kevin Anderson
- (Cyprus) Marcos Baghdatis → replaced by (Russia) Konstantin Kravchuk
- (Belgium) Steve Darcis → replaced by (Argentina) Renzo Olivo
- (Spain) David Ferrer (Achilles tendon injury) → replaced by (United States) Donald Young
- (France) Richard Gasquet (appendicitis) → replaced by (Japan) Yoshihito Nishioka
- (France) Paul-Henri Mathieu (birth of child) → replaced by (Brazil) Thiago Monteiro
- (Germany) Florian Mayer → replaced by (Argentina) Guido Pella
- (Canada) Milos Raonic (hamstring injury) → replaced by (Kazakhstan) Mikhail Kukushkin
- (France) Gilles Simon → replaced by (United States) Ryan Harrison

During the tournament

- (Spain) Roberto Bautista Agut
- (Australia) Nick Kyrgios

=== Retirements ===
- (Ukraine) Alexandr Dolgopolov
- (Australia) Jordan Thompson

== ATP doubles main-draw entrants ==
=== Seeds ===
Country	Player	Country	Player	Rank^{1}	Seed
FRA	Pierre-Hugues Herbert	FRA	Nicolas Mahut	3	1
USA	Bob Bryan	USA	Mike Bryan	6	2
FIN	Henri Kontinen	AUS	John Peers	11	3
GBR	Jamie Murray	BRA	Bruno Soares	15	4
ESP	Feliciano López	ESP	Marc López	23	5
RSA	Raven Klaasen	USA	Rajeev Ram	27	6
CRO	Ivan Dodig	ESP	Marcel Granollers	28	7
POL	Łukasz Kubot	BRA	Marcelo Melo	30	8

- ^{1} Rankings as of March 6, 2017.

=== Other entrants ===
The following pairs received wildcards into the doubles main draw:

- (Argentina) Juan Martín del Potro / (India) Leander Paes
- (Australia) Nick Kyrgios / (Serbia) Nenad Zimonjić

The following pair received entry as alternates:

- (France) Benoît Paire / (New Zealand) Michael Venus

=== Withdrawals ===
Before the tournament

- (France) Jo-Wilfried Tsonga (foot injury)

During the tournament

- (Spain) Roberto Bautista Agut

== WTA singles main-draw entrants ==
=== Seeds ===
The following are the seeded players. Seedings are based on WTA rankings as of February 27, 2017. Rankings and points before are as of March 6, 2017.

Seed	Rank	Player	Points before	Points defending	Points won	Points after	Status
~~1~~	~~1~~	~~(United States) Serena Williams~~	7,780	650	0	7,130	Withdrew due to left knee injury
2	2	(Germany) Angelique Kerber	7,405	10	120	7,515	Fourth round lost to (Russia) Elena Vesnina [14]
3	3	(Czech Republic) Karolína Plíšková	5,640	390	390	5,640	Semifinals lost to (Russia) Svetlana Kuznetsova [8]
4	4	(Romania) Simona Halep	5,172	215	65	5,022	Third round lost to (France) Kristina Mladenovic [28]
5	5	(Slovakia) Dominika Cibulková	5,075	35	120	5,160	Fourth round lost to (Russia) Anastasia Pavlyuchenkova [19]
6	6	(Poland) Agnieszka Radwańska	4,670	390	65	4,345	Third round lost to (China) Peng Shuai [Q]
7	7	(Spain) Garbiñe Muguruza	4,585	10	215	4,790	Quarterfinals lost to (Czech Republic) Karolína Plíšková [3]
8	8	(Russia) Svetlana Kuznetsova	3,915	10	650	4,555	Runner-up, lost to (Russia) Elena Vesnina [14]
9	9	(United States) Madison Keys	3,897	10	120	4,007	Fourth round lost to (Denmark) Caroline Wozniacki [13]
10	10	(Ukraine) Elina Svitolina	3,795	65	120	3,850	Fourth round lost to (Spain) Garbiñe Muguruza [7]
11	11	(United Kingdom) Johanna Konta	3,600	120	65	3,545	Third round lost to (France) Caroline Garcia [21]
12	13	(United States) Venus Williams	3,280	10	215	3,485	Quarterfinals lost to (Russia) Elena Vesnina [14]
13	14	(Denmark) Caroline Wozniacki	3,020	10	215	3,225	Quarterfinals lost to (France) Kristina Mladenovic [28]
14	15	(Russia) Elena Vesnina	2,340	20	1,000	3,320	Champion, defeated (Russia) Svetlana Kuznetsova [8]
15	16	(Switzerland) Timea Bacsinszky	2,303	120	120	2,303	Fourth round retired against (Czech Republic) Karolína Plíšková [3]
16	18	(Australia) Samantha Stosur	2,120	120	10	2,010	Second round lost to (Germany) Julia Görges
17	19	(Czech Republic) Barbora Strýcová	2,050	120	65	1,995	Third round lost to (Russia) Anastasia Pavlyuchenkova [19]
18	20	(Netherlands) Kiki Bertens	1,939	45	66	1,960	Third round lost to (Switzerland) Timea Bacsinszky [15]
19	21	(Russia) Anastasia Pavlyuchenkova	1,936	10	215	2,141	Quarterfinals lost to (Russia) Svetlana Kuznetsova [8]
20	22	(United States) CoCo Vandeweghe	1,933	65	10	1,878	Second round lost to (Czech Republic) Lucie Šafářová
21	25	(France) Caroline Garcia	1,705	10	120	1,815	Fourth round lost to (Russia) Svetlana Kuznetsova [8]
22	23	(Latvia) Anastasija Sevastova	1,735	20	10	1,725	Second round lost to (United States) Lauren Davis
23	24	(Spain) Carla Suárez Navarro	1,726	0	10	1,736	Second round lost to (Czech Republic) Kateřina Siniaková
24	27	(Australia) Daria Gavrilova	1,660	10	65	1,715	Third round lost to (Ukraine) Elina Svitolina [10]
25	28	(Hungary) Tímea Babos	1,620	10	65	1,675	Third round lost to (Russia) Elena Vesnina [14]
26	29	(Italy) Roberta Vinci	1,590	120	65	1,535	Third round lost to (Russia) Svetlana Kuznetsova [8]
27	31	(Kazakhstan) Yulia Putintseva	1,580	65	10	1,525	Second round lost to (France) Pauline Parmentier
28	26	(France) Kristina Mladenovic	1,700	10	390	2,080	Semifinals lost to (Russia) Elena Vesnina [14]
29	32	(Romania) Irina-Camelia Begu	1,562	10	65	1,617	Third round lost to (Czech Republic) Karolína Plíšková [3]
30	34	(China) Zhang Shuai	1,535	65	10	1,480	Second round lost to (Japan) Naomi Osaka
31	33	(Croatia) Ana Konjuh	1,546	29	10	1,527	Second round lost to (China) Peng Shuai [Q]
32	30	(Croatia) Mirjana Lučić-Baroni	1,589	10	10	1,589	Second round lost to (United States) Kayla Day [WC]
33	35	(Russia) Daria Kasatkina	1,490	215	10	1,285	Second round lost to (Czech Republic) Kristýna Plíšková

=== Other entrants ===
The following players received wildcards into the singles main draw:

- (United States) Jennifer Brady
- (United States) Danielle Collins
- (United States) Irina Falconi
- (United States) Kayla Day
- (United States) Nicole Gibbs
- (United States) Bethanie Mattek-Sands
- (United States) Taylor Townsend
- (Croatia) Donna Vekić

The following player received entry using a protected ranking:

- (Croatia) Ajla Tomljanović

The following players received entry from the qualifying draw:

- (Germany) Mona Barthel
- (Colombia) Mariana Duque Mariño
- (Estonia) Anett Kontaveit
- (United States) Varvara Lepchenko
- (Poland) Magda Linette
- (Germany) Tatjana Maria
- (Luxembourg) Mandy Minella
- (Japan) Risa Ozaki
- (China) Peng Shuai
- (Italy) Francesca Schiavone
- (Spain) Sara Sorribes Tormo
- (Romania) Patricia Maria Țig

The following player received entry as a lucky loser:

- (Russia) Evgeniya Rodina

=== Withdrawals ===
Before the tournament

- (Belarus) Victoria Azarenka (maternity) → replaced by (United States) Vania King
- (France) Alizé Cornet (torn pectoral) → replaced by (United Kingdom) Heather Watson
- (Germany) Anna-Lena Friedsam → replaced by (Romania) Sorana Cîrstea
- (Italy) Karin Knapp → replaced by (Croatia) Mirjana Lučić-Baroni
- (Czech Republic) Petra Kvitová (knife attack injury) → replaced by (Croatia) Ajla Tomljanović
- (United States) Sloane Stephens (foot surgery) → replaced by (Japan) Kurumi Nara
- (United States) Serena Williams (knee injury) → replaced by (Russia) Evgeniya Rodina

=== Retirements ===
- (Switzerland) Timea Bacsinszky
- (United States) Vania King

== WTA doubles main-draw entrants ==
=== Seeds ===
Country	Player	Country	Player	Rank^{1}	Seed
USA	Bethanie Mattek-Sands	CZE	Lucie Šafářová	3	1
RUS	Ekaterina Makarova	RUS	Elena Vesnina	11	2
FRA	Caroline Garcia	CZE	Karolína Plíšková	17	3
IND	Sania Mirza	CZE	Barbora Strýcová	19	4
CZE	Andrea Hlaváčková	CHN	Peng Shuai	22	5
TPE	Chan Yung-jan	SUI	Martina Hingis	24	6
USA	Vania King	KAZ	Yaroslava Shvedova	35	7
USA	Abigail Spears	SLO	Katarina Srebotnik	40	8

- ^{1} Rankings as of February 27, 2017.

=== Other entrants ===
The following pairs received wildcards into the doubles main draw:

- (Australia) Ashleigh Barty / (Australia) Casey Dellacqua
- (France) Caroline Garcia / (Czech Republic) Karolína Plíšková
- (United States) Shelby Rogers / (United States) CoCo Vandeweghe
