= 2017 BNP Paribas Open – Women's singles =

Women's singles
- 2017 BNP Paribas Open

Final
- Champion: (Russia) Elena Vesnina
- Runner-up: (Russia) Svetlana Kuznetsova
- Score: 6–7^{(6–8)}, 7–5, 6–4

Details
- Draw: 96
- Seeds: 32

Events
Singles	men	women
Doubles	men	women
- Indian Wells Open

Elena Vesnina defeated Svetlana Kuznetsova in the final, 6–7^{(6–8)}, 7–5, 6–4 to win the women's singles tennis title at the 2017 Indian Wells Masters. It was Vesnina's first WTA 1000 singles title and the last singles title of her career. This was the second all-Russian final in tournament history, following the 2006 edition.

Victoria Azarenka was the reigning champion, but did not participate this year as she was on maternity leave.

Due to the pre-tournament withdrawal of Serena Williams due to a left knee injury, Angelique Kerber regained the world No. 1 ranking at the end of the tournament.

== Seeds ==
All seeds receive a bye into the second round.

1. (United States) Serena Williams (withdrew due to knee injury)
2. (Germany) Angelique Kerber (fourth round)
3. (Czech Republic) Karolína Plíšková (semifinals)
4. (Romania) Simona Halep (third round)
5. (Slovakia) Dominika Cibulková (fourth round)
6. (Poland) Agnieszka Radwańska (third round)
7. (Spain) Garbiñe Muguruza (quarterfinals)
8. (Russia) Svetlana Kuznetsova (final)
9. (United States) Madison Keys (fourth round)
10. (Ukraine) Elina Svitolina (fourth round)
11. (United Kingdom) Johanna Konta (third round)
12. (United States) Venus Williams (quarterfinals)
13. (Denmark) Caroline Wozniacki (quarterfinals)
14. (Russia) Elena Vesnina (champion)
15. (Switzerland) Timea Bacsinszky (fourth round, retired)
16. (Australia) Samantha Stosur (second round)
17. (Czech Republic) Barbora Strýcová (third round)

18. (Netherlands) Kiki Bertens (third round)
19. (Russia) Anastasia Pavlyuchenkova (quarterfinals)
20. (United States) CoCo Vandeweghe (second round)
21. (France) Caroline Garcia (fourth round)
22. (Latvia) Anastasija Sevastova (second round)
23. (Spain) Carla Suárez Navarro (second round)
24. (Australia) Daria Gavrilova (third round)
25. (Hungary) Tímea Babos (third round)
26. (Italy) Roberta Vinci (third round)
27. (Kazakhstan) Yulia Putintseva (second round)
28. (France) Kristina Mladenovic (semifinals)
29. (Romania) Irina-Camelia Begu (third round)
30. (China) Zhang Shuai (second round)
31. (Croatia) Ana Konjuh (second round)
32. (Croatia) Mirjana Lučić-Baroni (second round)
33. (Russia) Daria Kasatkina (second round)

Click on the seed number of a player to go to their draw section.

== Draw ==
Key

- Q = Qualifier
- WC = Wild card
- LL = Lucky loser
- Alt = Alternate
- ITF = ITF entry
- PR = Protected ranking
- SR = Special ranking
- SE = Special exempt
- JE = Junior exempt
- JR = Junior Accelerator Programme entrant
- CO = College Accelerator Programme entrant
- NG = Next Gen Accelerator Program entrant
- w/o = Walkover
- r = Retired
- d = Defaulted

=== Finals ===
Quarter-finals
3	(Czech Republic) Karolína Plíšková	7^{7}	7^{7}
7	(Spain) Garbiñe Muguruza	6^{2}	6^{5}
19	(Russia) Anastasia Pavlyuchenkova	3	2
8	(Russia) Svetlana Kuznetsova	6	6
13	(Denmark) Caroline Wozniacki	6	6^{4}	2
28	(France) Kristina Mladenovic	3	7^{7}	6
12	(United States) Venus Williams	2	6	3
14	(Russia) Elena Vesnina	6	4	6

Semi-finals
3	(Czech Republic) Karolína Plíšková	6^{5}	6^{2}
8	(Russia) Svetlana Kuznetsova	7^{7}	7^{7}
28	(France) Kristina Mladenovic	3	4
14	(Russia) Elena Vesnina	6	6

Final
8	(Russia) Svetlana Kuznetsova	7^{8}	5	4
14	(Russia) Elena Vesnina	6^{6}	7	6

=== Top half ===
==== Section 1 ====
First round
(Puerto Rico) M Puig	6	6
WC	(United States) D Collins	0	2
(United States) L Chirico	6	6
Q	(Italy) F Schiavone	3	3
(Switzerland) B Bencic	6	6
(Bulgaria) T Pironkova	4	1
(Romania) M Niculescu	4	6	6
(Romania) S Cîrstea	6	3	1

Second round
3	(Czech Republic) Ka Plíšková	1	6	6
(Puerto Rico) M Puig	6	4	4
(United States) L Chirico	1	5
29	(Romania) I-C Begu	6	7
18	(Netherlands) K Bertens	6	6
(Switzerland) B Bencic	2	2
(Romania) M Niculescu	5	2
15	(Switzerland) T Bacsinszky	7	6

Third round
3	(Czech Republic) Ka Plíšková	6	7^{7}
29	(Romania) I-C Begu	4	6^{2}
18	(Netherlands) K Bertens	3	7	6^{8}
15	(Switzerland) T Bacsinszky	6	5	7^{10}

Fourth round
3	(Czech Republic) Ka Plíšková	5
15	(Switzerland) T Bacsinszky	1^{r}

==== Section 2 ====
First round
(Ukraine) K Bondarenko	7	4	4
(China) Q Wang	5	6	6
(Belgium) Y Wickmayer	6	3	6
(Germany) L Siegemund	3	6	4
WC	(United States) K Day	6	6
(Japan) K Nara	3	4
(United States) C Bellis	6	1	4
(Belgium) K Flipkens	4	6	6

Second round
10	(Ukraine) E Svitolina	3	6	7^{7}
(China) Q Wang	6	3	6^{3}
(Belgium) Y Wickmayer	2	6^{5}
24	(Australia) D Gavrilova	6	7^{7}
32	(Croatia) M Lučić-Baroni	4	7	5
WC	(United States) K Day	6	5	7
(Belgium) K Flipkens	2	3
7	(Spain) G Muguruza	6	6

Third round
10	(Ukraine) E Svitolina	6	6
24	(Australia) D Gavrilova	2	1
WC	(United States) K Day	6	5	2
7	(Spain) G Muguruza	3	7	6

Fourth round
10	(Ukraine) E Svitolina	6^{5}	6	0
7	(Spain) G Muguruza	7^{7}	1	6

==== Section 3 ====
First round
(Latvia) J Ostapenko	6	2	7^{7}
(Montenegro) D Kovinić	4	6	6^{3}
(Czech Republic) Kr Plíšková	6	6
WC	(United States) B Mattek-Sands	0	3
Q	(Estonia) A Kontaveit	7	6
(Japan) M Doi	5	4
(Italy) S Errani	1	6	7
Q	(Luxembourg) M Minella	6	4	5

Second round
5	(Slovakia) D Cibulková	6	3	6
(Latvia) J Ostapenko	4	6	3
(Czech Republic) Kr Plíšková	6	6
33	(Russia) D Kasatkina	0	3
19	(Russia) A Pavlyuchenkova	6	6
Q	(Estonia) A Kontaveit	4	4
(Italy) S Errani	4	7	2
17	(Czech Republic) B Strýcová	6	5	6

Third round
5	(Slovakia) D Cibulková	2	7^{7}	7^{7}
(Czech Republic) Kr Plíšková	6	6^{5}	6^{4}
19	(Russia) A Pavlyuchenkova	6	6
17	(Czech Republic) B Strýcová	3	2

Fourth round
5	(Slovakia) D Cibulková	4	6	2
19	(Russia) A Pavlyuchenkova	6	3	6

==== Section 4 ====
First round
WC	(United States) N Gibbs	6	2	2
(United Kingdom) H Watson	4	6	6
LL	(Russia) E Rodina	6	6
(United States) C McHale	1	0
(United States) M Brengle	6	6
Q	(Germany) T Maria	4	2
(Sweden) J Larsson	7^{7}	6
(Italy) C Giorgi	6^{3}	3

Second round
11	(United Kingdom) J Konta	6	6
(United Kingdom) H Watson	4	4
LL	(Russia) E Rodina	3	3
21	(France) C Garcia	6	6
26	(Italy) R Vinci	7^{7}	6
(United States) M Brengle	6^{5}	4
(Sweden) J Larsson	6^{3}	4
8	(Russia) S Kuznetsova	7^{7}	6

Third round
11	(United Kingdom) J Konta	6	3	6^{1}
21	(France) C Garcia	3	6	7^{7}
26	(Italy) R Vinci	2	6	1
8	(Russia) S Kuznetsova	6	2	6

Fourth round
21	(France) C Garcia	1	4
8	(Russia) S Kuznetsova	6	6

=== Bottom half ===
==== Section 5 ====
First round
Q	(Colombia) M Duque Mariño	6	0	6
Q	(Romania) PM Țig	4	6	4
(Japan) N Osaka	6	6
Q	(Japan) R Ozaki	4	2
(Czech Republic) K Siniaková	4	6	6
Q	(Germany) M Barthel	6	4	4
WC	(United States) T Townsend	4	2
Q	(Poland) M Linette	6	6

Second round
9	(United States) M Keys	6	7
Q	(Colombia) M Duque Mariño	1	5
(Japan) N Osaka	6	6
30	(China) S Zhang	4	2
23	(Spain) C Suárez Navarro	3	5
(Czech Republic) K Siniaková	6	7
Q	(Poland) M Linette	3	0
13	(Denmark) C Wozniacki	6	6

Third round
9	(United States) M Keys	6	6
(Japan) N Osaka	1	4
(Czech Republic) K Siniaková	3	1
13	(Denmark) C Wozniacki	6	6

Fourth round
9	(United States) M Keys	4	4
13	(Denmark) C Wozniacki	6	6

==== Section 6 ====
First round
(Germany) J Görges	7	6
PR	(Croatia) A Tomljanović	5	2
(Switzerland) V Golubic	4	6	5
(United States) L Davis	6	4	7
(Germany) A Beck	3	6	6
(Canada) E Bouchard	6	2	2
(United States) A Riske	3	6^{2}
WC	(Croatia) D Vekić	6	7^{7}

Second round
16	(Australia) S Stosur	6	4	4
(Germany) J Görges	4	6	6
(United States) L Davis	7	6
22	(Latvia) A Sevastova	5	3
28	(France) K Mladenovic	6	7
(Germany) A Beck	0	5
WC	(Croatia) D Vekić	4	1
4	(Romania) S Halep	6	6

Third round
(Germany) J Görges	1	4
(United States) L Davis	6	6
28	(France) K Mladenovic	6	6
4	(Romania) S Halep	3	3

Fourth round
(United States) L Davis	3	3
28	(France) K Mladenovic	6	6

==== Section 7 ====
First round
Q	(Spain) S Sorribes Tormo	6	6
(Russia) E Makarova	4	2
Q	(China) S Peng	6	2	7
(Ukraine) L Tsurenko	2	6	5
(Spain) L Arruabarrena	3	2
(Czech Republic) L Šafářová	6	6
(Serbia) J Janković	6	3	6
WC	(United States) I Falconi	2	6	3

Second round
6	(Poland) A Radwańska	6	6
Q	(Spain) S Sorribes Tormo	3	4
Q	(China) S Peng	6	6
31	(Croatia) A Konjuh	4	2
20	(United States) C Vandeweghe	6	4	1
(Czech Republic) L Šafářová	4	6	6
(Serbia) J Janković	6	6^{5}	1
12	(United States) V Williams	1	7^{7}	6

Third round
6	(Poland) A Radwańska	4	4
Q	(China) S Peng	6	6
(Czech Republic) L Šafářová	4	2
12	(United States) V Williams	6	6

Fourth round
Q	(China) S Peng	6	1	3
12	(United States) V Williams	3	6	6

==== Section 8 ====
First round
WC	(United States) J Brady	4	6^{4}
(United States) S Rogers	6	7^{7}
(Kazakhstan) Y Shvedova	6	2	4
Q	(United States) V Lepchenko	4	6	6
(France) P Parmentier	6	6
(France) O Dodin	2	4
(United States) V King	0	0^{r}
(Germany) A Petkovic	6	2

Second round
14	(Russia) E Vesnina	6	7
(United States) S Rogers	4	5
Q	(United States) V Lepchenko	6	6^{2}	2
25	(Hungary) T Babos	4	7^{7}	6
27	(Kazakhstan) Y Putintseva	2	3
(France) P Parmentier	6	6
(Germany) A Petkovic	2	1
2	(Germany) A Kerber	6	6

Third round
14	(Russia) E Vesnina	6	1	6
25	(Hungary) T Babos	4	6	4
(France) P Parmentier	5	6	5
2	(Germany) A Kerber	7	3	7

Fourth round
14	(Russia) E Vesnina	6	6
2	(Germany) A Kerber	3	3

== Qualifying ==
=== Seeds ===
1. (China) Peng Shuai (qualified)
2. (Germany) Carina Witthöft (first round)
3. (Belgium) Elise Mertens (first round)
4. (China) Duan Yingying (first round)
5. (Luxembourg) Mandy Minella (qualified)
6. (Russia) Natalia Vikhlyantseva (first round)
7. (Russia) Evgeniya Rodina (qualifying competition, lucky loser)
8. (Greece) Maria Sakkari (qualifying competition)
9. (Japan) Risa Ozaki (qualified)
10. (United States) Varvara Lepchenko (qualified)
11. (Poland) Magda Linette (qualified)
12. (United States) Julia Boserup (qualifying competition)
13. (Germany) Mona Barthel (qualified)
14. (Romania) Patricia Maria Țig (qualified)
15. (Spain) Sara Sorribes Tormo (qualified)
16. (Germany) Tatjana Maria (qualified)
17. (United Kingdom) Naomi Broady (first round)
18. (Japan) Nao Hibino (qualifying competition)
19. (Estonia) Anett Kontaveit (qualified)
20. (New Zealand) Marina Erakovic (first round)
21. (Colombia) Mariana Duque Mariño (qualified)
22. (Belarus) Aliaksandra Sasnovich (first round)
23. (Ukraine) Kateryna Kozlova (first round)
24. (Slovakia) Rebecca Šramková (first round)

=== Qualifiers ===
1. (China) Peng Shuai
2. (Estonia) Anett Kontaveit
3. (Germany) Tatjana Maria
4. (Italy) Francesca Schiavone
5. (Luxembourg) Mandy Minella
6. (Spain) Sara Sorribes Tormo
7. (Germany) Mona Barthel
8. (Colombia) Mariana Duque Mariño
9. (Japan) Risa Ozaki
10. (United States) Varvara Lepchenko
11. (Poland) Magda Linette
12. (Romania) Patricia Maria Țig

=== Lucky loser ===
1. (Russia) Evgeniya Rodina

=== Draw ===
==== First qualifier ====
First round
1	(China) Peng Shuai	6	7^{7}
(Belgium) Alison Van Uytvanck	2	6^{2}
(United States) Jamie Loeb	6	6^{7}	6
20	(New Zealand) Marina Erakovic	4	7^{9}	1

Qualifying competition
1	(China) Peng Shuai	6	6
(United States) Jamie Loeb	1	3

==== Second qualifier ====
First round
2	(Germany) Carina Witthöft	4	3
(Bulgaria) Sesil Karatantcheva	6	6
WC	(United States) Claire Liu	2	1
19	(Estonia) Anett Kontaveit	6	6

Qualifying competition
(Bulgaria) Sesil Karatantcheva	1	2
19	(Estonia) Anett Kontaveit	6	6

==== Third qualifier ====
First round
3	(Belgium) Elise Mertens	2	6	6^{4}
(United States) Sachia Vickery	6	2	7^{7}
WC	(United States) Caroline Dolehide	6	4	2
16	(Germany) Tatjana Maria	3	6	6

Qualifying competition
(United States) Sachia Vickery	2	2
16	(Germany) Tatjana Maria	6	6

==== Fourth qualifier ====
First round
4	(China) Duan Yingying	7^{7}	3	3
(Bulgaria) Elitsa Kostova	6^{5}	6	6
(Italy) Francesca Schiavone	3	6	6
23	(Ukraine) Kateryna Kozlova	6	1	4

Qualifying competition
(Bulgaria) Elitsa Kostova	6	0	0
(Italy) Francesca Schiavone	1	6	6

==== Fifth qualifier ====
First round
5	(Luxembourg) Mandy Minella	6	6
WC	(Slovakia) Daniela Hantuchová	2	4
(Czech Republic) Tereza Martincová	4	6	6
17	(United Kingdom) Naomi Broady	6	2	3

Qualifying competition
5	(Luxembourg) Mandy Minella	4	6	6
(Czech Republic) Tereza Martincová	6	4	3

==== Sixth qualifier ====
First round
6	(Russia) Natalia Vikhlyantseva	6	4	4
WC	(United States) Jacqueline Cako	4	6	6
(United States) Grace Min	7	4	1
15	(Spain) Sara Sorribes Tormo	5	6	6

Qualifying competition
WC	(United States) Jacqueline Cako	2	0
15	(Spain) Sara Sorribes Tormo	6	6

==== Seventh qualifier ====
First round
7	(Russia) Evgeniya Rodina	7^{7}	6
(Canada) Françoise Abanda	6^{2}	3
WC	(United States) Maria Sanchez	2	5
13	(Germany) Mona Barthel	6	7

Qualifying competition
7	(Russia) Evgeniya Rodina	4	4
13	(Germany) Mona Barthel	6	6

==== Eighth qualifier ====
First round
8	(Greece) Maria Sakkari	4	6	6
PR	(Croatia) Jana Fett	6	3	4
(Bulgaria) Viktoriya Tomova	2	2
21	(Colombia) Mariana Duque Mariño	6	6

Qualifying competition
8	(Greece) Maria Sakkari	6^{4}	3
21	(Colombia) Mariana Duque Mariño	7^{7}	6

==== Ninth qualifier ====
First round
9	(Japan) Risa Ozaki	6	6
(Paraguay) Verónica Cepede Royg	4	4
(United States) Samantha Crawford	2	6	6
22	(Belarus) Aliaksandra Sasnovich	6	3	2

Qualifying competition
9	(Japan) Risa Ozaki	1	6	7^{7}
(United States) Samantha Crawford	6	3	6^{5}

==== Tenth qualifier ====
First round
10	(United States) Varvara Lepchenko	6	6
WC	(Slovakia) Anna Karolína Schmiedlová	1	3
(Czech Republic) Lucie Hradecká	6	6^{5}	6
24	(Slovakia) Rebecca Šramková	2	7^{7}	2

Qualifying competition
10	(United States) Varvara Lepchenko	6	6
(Czech Republic) Lucie Hradecká	0	3

==== Eleventh qualifier ====
First round
11	(Poland) Magda Linette	7	6
(United States) Sofia Kenin	5	0
(Romania) Ana Bogdan	6	2	6^{1}
18	(Japan) Nao Hibino	4	6	7^{7}

Qualifying competition
11	(Poland) Magda Linette	6	7^{11}
18	(Japan) Nao Hibino	1	6^{9}

==== Twelfth qualifier ====
First round
12	(United States) Julia Boserup	7^{9}	6
(United States) Asia Muhammad	6^{7}	4
(Japan) Shuko Aoyama	0	2
14	(Romania) Patricia Maria Țig	6	6

Qualifying competition
12	(United States) Julia Boserup	5	0
14	(Romania) Patricia Maria Țig	7	6
