= 2016 BNP Paribas Open =

- Date: March 7–20
- Edition: 43rd (ATP) / 28th (WTA)
- Category: ATP World Tour Masters 1000 (Men); WTA Premier Mandatory (Women)
- Draw: 96S / 32D
- Prize money: $7,107,445 (ATP) $6,844,139 (WTA)
- Surface: Hard
- Location: Indian Wells, California, United States
- Venue: Indian Wells Tennis Garden

Champions

Men's singles
- (Serbia) Novak Djokovic

Women's singles
- (Belarus) Victoria Azarenka

Men's doubles
- (France) Pierre-Hugues Herbert / (France) Nicolas Mahut

Women's doubles
- (United States) Bethanie Mattek-Sands / (United States) CoCo Vandeweghe
← 2015 ·	Indian Wells Open	· 2017 →

The 2016 BNP Paribas Open (also known as the 2016 Indian Wells Open) was a professional tennis tournament played at Indian Wells, California in March 2016. It was the 43rd edition of the men's event and 28th of the women's event, and was classified as an ATP World Tour Masters 1000 event on the 2016 ATP World Tour and a Premier Mandatory event on the 2016 WTA Tour. Both the men's and the women's events took place at the Indian Wells Tennis Garden in Indian Wells, California, from March 7 through March 20, 2016, on outdoor hard courts.

== Finals ==
=== Men's singles ===
- (Serbia) Novak Djokovic defeated (Canada) Milos Raonic, 6–2, 6–0

=== Women's singles ===
- (Belarus) Victoria Azarenka defeated (United States) Serena Williams, 6–4, 6–4

=== Men's doubles ===
- (France) Pierre-Hugues Herbert / (France) Nicolas Mahut defeated (Canada) Vasek Pospisil / (United States) Jack Sock, 6–3, 7–6^{(7–5)}

=== Women's doubles ===
- (United States) Bethanie Mattek-Sands / (United States) CoCo Vandeweghe defeated (Germany) Julia Görges / (Czech Republic) Karolína Plíšková, 4–6, 6–4, [10–6]

== Points and prize money ==
=== Point distribution ===
Event	W	F	SF	QF	Round of 16	Round of 32	Round of 64	Round of 128	Q	Q2	Q1
Men's singles	1000	600	360	180	90	45	25*	10	16	8	0
Men's doubles	1000	600	360	180	90	0	—	—	—	—	—
Women's singles	1000	650	390	215	120	65	35*	10	30	20	2
Women's doubles	1000	650	390	215	120	10	—	—	—	—	—

- Players with byes receive first-round points.

=== Prize money ===
Event	W	F	SF	QF	Round of 16	Round of 32	Round of 64	Round of 128	Q2	Q1
Men's singles	$1,028,300	$501,815	$251,500	$128,215	$67,590	$36,170	$19,530	$11,970	$3,565	$1,825
Women's singles	$1,028,300	$501,815	$251,500	$128,215	$67,590	$36,170	$19,530	$11,970	$3,565	$1,825
Men's doubles	$336,920	$164,420	$82,410	$42,000	$22,140	$11,860	—	—	—	—
Women's doubles	$336,920	$164,420	$82,410	$42,000	$22,140	$11,860	—	—	—	—

== ATP singles main-draw entrants ==
=== Seeds ===
The following are the seeded players. Rankings and seedings are based on ATP rankings as of March 7, 2016.

Seed	Rank	Player	Points before	Points defending	Points won	Points after	Status
1	1	(Serbia) Novak Djokovic	16,540	1,000	1,000	16,540	Champion, defeated (Canada) Milos Raonic [12]
2	2	(United Kingdom) Andy Murray	8,685	360	45	8,370	Third round lost to (Argentina) Federico Delbonis
3	4	(Switzerland) Stan Wawrinka	6,325	10	90	6,405	Fourth round lost to (Belgium) David Goffin [15]
4	5	(Spain) Rafael Nadal	4,810	180	360	4,990	Semifinals lost to (Serbia) Novak Djokovic [1]
5	6	(Japan) Kei Nishikori	3,980	90	180	4,070	Quarterfinals lost to (Spain) Rafael Nadal [4]
6	7	(Czech Republic) Tomáš Berdych	3,900	180	90	3,810	Fourth round lost to (Canada) Milos Raonic [12]
7	9	(France) Jo-Wilfried Tsonga	2,950	0	180	3,130	Quarterfinals lost to (Serbia) Novak Djokovic [1]
8	10	(France) Richard Gasquet	2,715	10	90	2,795	Fourth round lost to (Croatia) Marin Čilić [10]
9	11	(United States) John Isner	2,585	90	90	2,585	Fourth round lost to (Japan) Kei Nishikori [5]
10	12	(Croatia) Marin Čilić	2,555	10	180	2,725	Quarterfinals lost to (Belgium) David Goffin [15]
11	13	(Austria) Dominic Thiem	2,430	10	90	2,510	Fourth round lost to (France) Jo-Wilfried Tsonga [7]
12	14	(Canada) Milos Raonic	2,410	360	600	2,650	Runner-up, lost to (Serbia) Novak Djokovic [1]
13	16	(France) Gaël Monfils	1,950	0	180	2,130	Quarterfinals lost to (Canada) Milos Raonic [12]
14	17	(Spain) Roberto Bautista Agut	1,935	45	45	1,935	Third round lost to (Spain) Feliciano López [18]
15	18	(Belgium) David Goffin	1,930	0	360	2,290	Semifinals lost to (Canada) Milos Raonic [12]
16	19	(France) Gilles Simon	1,855	90	45	1,810	Third round lost to (Germany) Alexander Zverev
17	20	(Australia) Bernard Tomic	1,805	180	45	1,670	Third round retired vs. (Canada) Milos Raonic [12]
18	21	(Spain) Feliciano López	1,630	180	90	1,540	Fourth round lost to (Serbia) Novak Djokovic [1]
19	22	(France) Benoît Paire	1,581	(20)^{†}	10	1,571	Second round lost to (France) Adrian Mannarino
20	23	(Serbia) Viktor Troicki	1,580	10	10	1,580	Second round lost to (Argentina) Leonardo Mayer
21	24	(United States) Jack Sock	1,570	90	45	1,525	Third round lost to (Austria) Dominic Thiem [11]
22	25	(Uruguay) Pablo Cuevas	1,510	45	10	1,475	Second round lost to (Argentina) Guido Pella
23	26	(Bulgaria) Grigor Dimitrov	1,420	45	10	1,385	Second round lost to (Germany) Alexander Zverev
24	27	(Australia) Nick Kyrgios	1,420	25	10	1,405	Second round lost to (Spain) Albert Ramos Viñolas
25	28	(Slovakia) Martin Kližan	1,420	25	10	1,405	Second round retired vs. (Spain) Fernando Verdasco
26	29	(Ukraine) Alexandr Dolgopolov	1,330	45	45	1,330	Third round lost to (France) Richard Gasquet [8]
27	30	(Germany) Philipp Kohlschreiber	1,330	45	45	1,330	Third round lost to (Serbia) Novak Djokovic [1]
28	32	(France) Jérémy Chardy	1,255	10	10	1,255	Second round lost to (Russia) Andrey Kuznetsov
29	33	(Brazil) Thomaz Bellucci	1,200	10	10	1,200	Second round lost to (Croatia) Borna Ćorić
30	35	(United States) Steve Johnson	1,190	45	45	1,190	Third round lost to (Japan) Kei Nishikori [5]
31	36	(United States) Sam Querrey	1,175	10	45	1,210	Third round lost to (France) Jo-Wilfried Tsonga [7]
32	37	(Portugal) João Sousa	1,146	10	10	1,146	Second round lost to (Argentina) Federico Delbonis

† The player did not qualify for the tournament in 2015. Accordingly, points for his 18th best result are deducted instead.

=== Other entrants ===
The following players received wildcards into the singles main draw:

- (Argentina) Juan Martín del Potro
- (United States) Jared Donaldson
- (United States) Taylor Fritz
- (United States) Mackenzie McDonald
- (United States) Frances Tiafoe

The following player received entry using a protected ranking into the main draw:

- (Russia) Dmitry Tursunov

The following players received entry from the qualifying draw:

- (Germany) Michael Berrer
- (United States) Bjorn Fratangelo
- (United States) Ryan Harrison
- (France) Pierre-Hugues Herbert
- (Slovakia) Jozef Kovalík
- (France) Vincent Millot
- (Argentina) Renzo Olivo
- (Canada) Peter Polansky
- (United States) Noah Rubin
- (United States) Alexander Sarkissian
- (United States) Tim Smyczek
- (Argentina) Marco Trungelliti

=== Withdrawals ===
Before the tournament

- (South Africa) Kevin Anderson → replaced by (United States) Rajeev Ram
- (Spain) Pablo Andújar → replaced by (Kazakhstan) Mikhail Kukushkin
- (Cyprus) Marcos Baghdatis → replaced by (Russia) Evgeny Donskoy
- (Italy) Simone Bolelli → replaced by (Russia) Dmitry Tursunov
- (Switzerland) Roger Federer → replaced by (Germany) Alexander Zverev
- (Spain) David Ferrer → replaced by (Australia) John Millman
- (Italy) Fabio Fognini → replaced by (Russia) Mikhail Youzhny
- (Austria) Andreas Haider-Maurer → replaced by (Latvia) Ernests Gulbis
- (Poland) Jerzy Janowicz → replaced by (Argentina) Diego Schwartzman
- (Croatia) Ivo Karlović → replaced by (France) Lucas Pouille
- (Italy) Paolo Lorenzi → replaced by (Bosnia and Herzegovina) Damir Džumhur
- (Spain) Tommy Robredo → replaced by (United Kingdom) Kyle Edmund
- (Ukraine) Sergiy Stakhovsky → replaced by (Netherlands) Thiemo de Bakker
- (Serbia) Janko Tipsarević → replaced by (Spain) Marcel Granollers

During the tournament

- (Russia) Mikhail Youzhny

=== Retirements ===
- (Slovakia) Martin Kližan
- (Australia) Bernard Tomic

== ATP doubles main-draw entrants ==
=== Seeds ===
Country	Player	Country	Player	Rank^{1}	Seed
NED	Jean-Julien Rojer	ROU	Horia Tecău	7	1
CRO	Ivan Dodig	BRA	Marcelo Melo	8	2
USA	Bob Bryan	USA	Mike Bryan	11	3
GBR	Jamie Murray	BRA	Bruno Soares	12	4
IND	Rohan Bopanna	ROU	Florin Mergea	20	5
CAN	Vasek Pospisil	USA	Jack Sock	31	6
FRA	Pierre-Hugues Herbert	FRA	Nicolas Mahut	31	7
FRA	Édouard Roger-Vasselin	SRB	Nenad Zimonjić	36	8

- ^{1} Rankings as of March 7, 2016.

=== Other entrants ===
The following pairs received wildcards into the doubles main draw:

- (India) Mahesh Bhupathi / (Switzerland) Stan Wawrinka
- (Australia) Nick Kyrgios / (Germany) Alexander Zverev

The following pairs received entry as alternates:

- (France) Jérémy Chardy / (France) Fabrice Martin
- (Czech Republic) Marek Michalička / (Czech Republic) Ivo Minář

=== Withdrawals ===
Before the tournament

- (India) Mahesh Bhupathi (leg injury)
- (Australia) Nick Kyrgios (illness)

=== Retirements ===
- (Colombia) Robert Farah (neck injury)

== WTA singles main-draw entrants ==
=== Seeds ===
The following are the seeded players. Seedings are based on WTA rankings as of February 29, 2016. Rankings and points before are as of March 7, 2016.

Seed	Rank	Player	Points before	Points defending	Points won	Points after	Status
1	1	(United States) Serena Williams	9,245	390	650	9,505	Runner-up, lost to (Belarus) Victoria Azarenka [13]
2	2	(Germany) Angelique Kerber	5,700	10	10	5,700	Second round lost to (Czech Republic) Denisa Allertová
3	3	(Poland) Agnieszka Radwańska	5,450	65	390	5,775	Semifinals lost to (United States) Serena Williams [1]
4	4	(Spain) Garbiñe Muguruza	4,831	65	10	4,776	Second round lost to (United States) Christina McHale
5	5	(Romania) Simona Halep	4,745	1,000	215	3,960	Quarterfinals lost to (United States) Serena Williams [1]
~~6~~	~~6~~	~~(Spain) Carla Suárez Navarro~~	4,015	215	0	3,800	Withdrew from the second round
7	8	(Switzerland) Belinda Bencic	3,505	120	65	3,450	Third round lost to (Slovakia) Magdaléna Rybáriková
8	9	(Czech Republic) Petra Kvitová	3,483	0	215	3,698	Quarterfinals lost to (Poland) Agnieszka Radwańska [3]
9	10	(Italy) Roberta Vinci	3,455	35	120	3,540	Fourth round retired vs. (Slovakia) Magdaléna Rybáriková
10	12	(United States) Venus Williams	3,082	0	10	3,092	Second round lost to (Japan) Kurumi Nara [Q]
11	13	(Czech Republic) Lucie Šafářová	2,823	65	10	2,768	Second round lost to (Kazakhstan) Yaroslava Shvedova
12	21	(Switzerland) Timea Bacsinszky	2,440	215	120	2,345	Fourth round lost to (Russia) Daria Kasatkina
13	15	(Belarus) Victoria Azarenka	2,660	65	1,000	3,595	Champion, defeated (United States) Serena Williams [1]
14	18	(Serbia) Ana Ivanovic	2,531	65	65	2,531	Third round lost to (Czech Republic) Karolína Plíšková [18]
15	16	(Italy) Sara Errani	2,585	65	10	2,530	Second round lost to (Ukraine) Lesia Tsurenko
16	17	(Russia) Svetlana Kuznetsova	2,535	65	10	2,480	Second round lost to (United States) CoCo Vandeweghe
17	14	(Ukraine) Elina Svitolina	2,750	120	65	2,695	Third round lost to (Italy) Roberta Vinci [9]
18	19	(Czech Republic) Karolína Plíšková	2,525	120	390	2,795	Semifinals lost to (Belarus) Victoria Azarenka [13]
19	20	(Serbia) Jelena Janković	2,505	650	120	1,975	Fourth round lost to (Poland) Agnieszka Radwańska [3]
20	25	(Denmark) Caroline Wozniacki	2,046	65	10	1,991	Second round lost to (China) Zhang Shuai [WC]
21	22	(United States) Sloane Stephens	2,215	120	10	2,105	Second round lost to (Canada) Eugenie Bouchard
22	23	(Germany) Andrea Petkovic	2,110	10	10	2,110	Second round lost to (Czech Republic) Barbora Strýcová
23	24	(United States) Madison Keys	2,060	65	10	2,005	Second round lost to (United States) Nicole Gibbs [Q]
24	27	(Russia) Anastasia Pavlyuchenkova	1,920	65	10	1,865	Second round lost to (Ukraine) Kateryna Bondarenko [Q]
25	26	(United Kingdom) Johanna Konta	1,928	(20)^{†}	120	2,028	Fourth round lost to (Czech Republic) Karolína Plíšková [18]
26	28	(Australia) Samantha Stosur	1,845	65	120	1,900	Fourth round lost to (Belarus) Victoria Azarenka [13]
27	29	(France) Kristina Mladenovic	1,780	10	10	1,780	Second round lost to (Kazakhstan) Yulia Putintseva
28	30	(Slovakia) Anna Karolína Schmiedlová	1,690	10	10	1,690	Second round lost to (Puerto Rico) Monica Puig
29	31	(Germany) Sabine Lisicki	1,682	390	10	1,302	Second round lost to (Sweden) Johanna Larsson
30	32	(Russia) Ekaterina Makarova	1,571	65	65	1,571	Third round lost to (Romania) Simona Halep [5]
31	33	(Australia) Daria Gavrilova	1,430	120	10	1,375	Second round lost to (Slovakia) Magdaléna Rybáriková
32	34	(Romania) Monica Niculescu	1,380	35	65	1,410	Third round lost to (Poland) Agnieszka Radwańska [3]

† The player did not qualify for the tournament in 2015. Accordingly, points for her 16th best result are deducted instead.

=== Other entrants ===
The following players received wildcards into the singles main draw:

- (United States) Samantha Crawford
- (United States) Lauren Davis
- (Slovakia) Daniela Hantuchová
- (United States) Jamie Loeb
- (United States) Alison Riske
- (United States) Shelby Rogers
- (United Kingdom) Heather Watson
- (China) Zhang Shuai

The following players received entry using a protected ranking into the main draw:

- (Czech Republic) Petra Cetkovská
- (United States) Vania King
- (China) Peng Shuai
- (United Kingdom) Laura Robson
- (Kazakhstan) Galina Voskoboeva

The following players received entry from the qualifying draw:

- (Netherlands) Kiki Bertens
- (Ukraine) Kateryna Bondarenko
- (United States) Nicole Gibbs
- (Japan) Kurumi Nara
- (Japan) Risa Ozaki
- (France) Pauline Parmentier
- (Czech Republic) Kristýna Plíšková
- (Belarus) Aliaksandra Sasnovich
- (Germany) Laura Siegemund
- (Czech Republic) Kateřina Siniaková
- (United States) Taylor Townsend
- (Croatia) Donna Vekić

The following player received entry as a lucky loser:

- (Germany) Anna-Lena Friedsam

=== Withdrawals ===
Before the tournament

- (Germany) Mona Barthel → replaced by (Slovakia) Magdaléna Rybáriková
- (France) Alizé Cornet → replaced by (Colombia) Mariana Duque Mariño
- (Italy) Karin Knapp → replaced by (United States) Vania King
- (United States) Varvara Lepchenko → replaced by (Bulgaria) Tsvetana Pironkova
- (Russia) Maria Sharapova (forearm injury and provisional suspension) → (Kazakhstan) replaced by Yulia Putintseva
- (Spain) Carla Suárez Navarro → replaced by (Germany) Anna-Lena Friedsam
- (Croatia) Ajla Tomljanović → replaced by (United States) Irina Falconi

=== Retirements ===
- (France) Pauline Parmentier
- (Czech Republic) Barbora Strýcová
- (Italy) Roberta Vinci

== WTA doubles main-draw entrants ==
=== Seeds ===
Country	Player	Country	Player	Rank^{1}	Seed
SUI	Martina Hingis	IND	Sania Mirza	2	1
TPE	Chan Hao-ching	TPE	Chan Yung-jan	11	2
HUN	Tímea Babos	KAZ	Yaroslava Shvedova	17	3
CZE	Andrea Hlaváčková	CZE	Lucie Hradecká	22	4
RUS	Ekaterina Makarova	CZE	Lucie Šafářová	25	5
~~FRA~~	~~Caroline Garcia~~	~~FRA~~	~~Kristina Mladenovic~~	~~26~~	~~6~~
ESP	Garbiñe Muguruza	ESP	Carla Suárez Navarro	31	7
USA	Raquel Atawo	USA	Abigail Spears	39	8

- ^{1} Rankings as of February 29, 2016.

=== Other entrants ===
The following pairs received wildcards into the doubles main draw:

- (Czech Republic) Denisa Allertová / (Czech Republic) Petra Kvitová
- (Belgium) Kirsten Flipkens / (Serbia) Ana Ivanovic
- (Germany) Angelique Kerber / (Germany) Andrea Petkovic
- (Russia) Svetlana Kuznetsova / (Russia) Anastasia Pavlyuchenkova

The following pair received entry as alternates:

- (Ukraine) Kateryna Bondarenko / (Ukraine) Olga Savchuk

=== Withdrawals ===
Before the tournament

- (France) Caroline Garcia (back injury)
