= 2016 BNP Paribas Open – Men's singles =

Men's singles
- 2016 BNP Paribas Open

Final
- Champion: (Serbia) Novak Djokovic
- Runner-up: (Canada) Milos Raonic
- Score: 6–2, 6–0

Details
- Draw: 96 (12 Q / 5 WC )
- Seeds: 32

Events
Singles	men	women
Doubles	men	women
- Indian Wells Masters

Two-time defending champion Novak Djokovic defeated Milos Raonic in the final, 6–2, 6–0 to win the men's singles tennis title at the 2016 Indian Wells Masters. It was his then-record-breaking fifth Indian Wells title, before Roger Federer tied the record the following year.

== Seeds ==
All seeds receive a bye into the second round.

1. (Serbia) Novak Djokovic (champion)
2. (United Kingdom) Andy Murray (third round)
3. (Switzerland) Stan Wawrinka (fourth round)
4. (Spain) Rafael Nadal (semifinals)
5. (Japan) Kei Nishikori (quarterfinals)
6. (Czech Republic) Tomáš Berdych (fourth round)
7. (France) Jo-Wilfried Tsonga (quarterfinals)
8. (France) Richard Gasquet (fourth round)
9. (United States) John Isner (fourth round)
10. (Croatia) Marin Čilić (quarterfinals)
11. (Austria) Dominic Thiem (fourth round)
12. (Canada) Milos Raonic (final)
13. (France) Gaël Monfils (quarterfinals)
14. (Spain) Roberto Bautista Agut (third round)
15. (Belgium) David Goffin (semifinals)
16. (France) Gilles Simon (third round)

17. (Australia) Bernard Tomic (third round, retired)
18. (Spain) Feliciano López (fourth round)
19. (France) Benoît Paire (second round)
20. (Serbia) Viktor Troicki (second round)
21. (United States) Jack Sock (third round)
22. (Uruguay) Pablo Cuevas (second round)
23. (Bulgaria) Grigor Dimitrov (second round)
24. (Australia) Nick Kyrgios (second round)
25. (Slovakia) Martin Kližan (second round, retired)
26. (Ukraine) Alexandr Dolgopolov (third round)
27. (Germany) Philipp Kohlschreiber (third round)
28. (France) Jérémy Chardy (second round)
29. (Brazil) Thomaz Bellucci (second round)
30. (United States) Steve Johnson (third round)
31. (United States) Sam Querrey (third round)
32. (Portugal) João Sousa (second round)

Click on the seed number of a player to go to their draw section.

== Draw ==
Key

- Q = Qualifier
- WC = Wild card
- LL = Lucky loser
- Alt = Alternate
- ITF = ITF entry
- PR = Protected ranking
- SR = Special ranking
- SE = Special exempt
- JE = Junior exempt
- JR = Junior Accelerator Programme entrant
- CO = College Accelerator Programme entrant
- NG = Next Gen Accelerator Program entrant
- w/o = Walkover
- r = Retired
- d = Defaulted

=== Finals ===
Quarterfinals
1	(Serbia) Novak Djokovic	7^{7}	7^{7}
7	(France) Jo-Wilfried Tsonga	6^{2}	6^{2}
4	(Spain) Rafael Nadal	6	6
5	(Japan) Kei Nishikori	4	3
10	(Croatia) Marin Čilić	6^{4}	2
15	(Belgium) David Goffin	7^{7}	6
12	(Canada) Milos Raonic	7	6
13	(France) Gaël Monfils	5	3

Semifinals
1	(Serbia) Novak Djokovic	7^{7}	6
4	(Spain) Rafael Nadal	6^{5}	2
15	(Belgium) David Goffin	3	6	3
12	(Canada) Milos Raonic	6	3	6

Final
1	(Serbia) Novak Djokovic	6	6
12	(Canada) Milos Raonic	2	0

=== Top half ===
==== Section 1 ====
First round
Q	(United States) B Fratangelo	6	6
(Russia) T Gabashvili	4	4
(Uzbekistan) D Istomin	3	6	1
(United States) D Kudla	6	2	6
(Latvia) E Gulbis	2	6^{2}
(Spain) G García López	6	7^{7}
(Russia) M Youzhny	7	2	6
(United Kingdom) A Bedene	5	6	3

Second round
1	(Serbia) N Djokovic	2	6	6
Q	(United States) B Fratangelo	6	1	2
(United States) D Kudla	0	1
27	(Germany) P Kohlschreiber	6	6
18	(Spain) F López	6	6
(Spain) G García López	2	2
(Russia) M Youzhny
14	(Spain) R Bautista Agut	w/o

Third round
1	(Serbia) N Djokovic	7	7
27	(Germany) P Kohlschreiber	5	5
18	(Spain) F López	7^{7}	6^{10}	6
14	(Spain) R Bautista Agut	6^{5}	7^{12}	4

Fourth round
1	(Serbia) N Djokovic	6	6
18	(Spain) F López	3	3

==== Section 2 ====
First round
Q	(France) P-H Herbert	4	7^{11}	6^{5}
Q	(Slovakia) J Kovalík	6	6^{9}	7^{7}
Q	(Germany) M Berrer	7^{7}	5	6
(Argentina) J Mónaco	6^{5}	7	4
(Czech Republic) J Veselý	4	6	2
(Netherlands) T de Bakker	6	4	6
Q	(France) V Millot	6	6
WC	(United States) M McDonald	1	3

Second round
11	(Austria) D Thiem	7^{7}	7^{7}
Q	(Slovakia) J Kovalík	6^{4}	6^{3}
Q	(Germany) M Berrer	2	4
21	(United States) J Sock	6	6
31	(United States) S Querrey	7^{7}	6
(Netherlands) T de Bakker	6^{5}	4
Q	(France) V Millot	5	1
7	(France) J-W Tsonga	7	6

Third round
11	(Austria) D Thiem	7	6^{5}	6
21	(United States) J Sock	5	7^{7}	1
31	(United States) S Querrey	3	4
7	(France) J-W Tsonga	6	6

Fourth round
11	(Austria) D Thiem	3	2
7	(France) J-W Tsonga	6	6

==== Section 3 ====
First round
(Luxembourg) G Müller	7	6
(Dominican Republic) V Estrella Burgos	5	3
Q	(Canada) P Polansky	6^{4}	3
(Spain) F Verdasco	7^{7}	6
(Croatia) I Dodig	6	5	3
(Germany) A Zverev	3	7	6
WC	(United States) J Donaldson	6^{5}	7^{7}	3
(Canada) V Pospisil	7^{7}	6^{2}	6

Second round
4	(Spain) R Nadal	6	2	6
(Luxembourg) G Müller	2	6	4
(Spain) F Verdasco	5
25	(Slovakia) M Kližan	3^{r}
23	(Bulgaria) G Dimitrov	4	6	5
(Germany) A Zverev	6	3	7
(Canada) V Pospisil	6	0	1
16	(France) G Simon	1	6	6

Third round
4	(Spain) R Nadal	6	7^{11}
(Spain) F Verdasco	0	6^{9}
(Germany) A Zverev	6	6
16	(France) G Simon	2	2

Fourth round
4	(Spain) R Nadal	6^{8}	6	7
(Germany) A Zverev	7^{10}	0	5

==== Section 4 ====
First round
(United States) D Young	6	4	3
(Italy) A Seppi	4	6	6
(Czech Republic) L Rosol	6	3	4
(France) A Mannarino	4	6	6
(Australia) J Millman	6	6
Q	(United States) A Sarkissian	2	0
(Kazakhstan) M Kukushkin	7^{7}	6
(Spain) D Muñoz de la Nava	6^{1}	2

Second round
9	(United States) J Isner	7^{7}	6
(Italy) A Seppi	6^{1}	4
(France) A Mannarino	6	6
19	(France) B Paire	1	3
30	(United States) S Johnson	6	6
(Australia) J Millman	4	2
(Kazakhstan) M Kukushkin	3	3
5	(Japan) K Nishikori	6	6

Third round
9	(United States) J Isner	6	7^{7}
(France) A Mannarino	4	6^{4}
30	(United States) S Johnson	6^{6}	6^{5}
5	(Japan) K Nishikori	7^{8}	7^{7}

Fourth round
9	(United States) J Isner	6	6^{2}	6^{5}
5	(Japan) K Nishikori	1	7^{7}	7^{7}

=== Bottom half ===
==== Section 5 ====
First round
(France) N Mahut	6	6
Q	(Argentina) R Olivo	2	4
(Argentina) D Schwartzman	3	4
(Netherlands) R Haase	6	6
(Australia) S Groth	4	3
(Argentina) L Mayer	6	6
Q	(United States) R Harrison	6	7^{7}
(Serbia) D Lajović	3	6^{3}

Second round
8	(France) R Gasquet	6	6
(France) N Mahut	4	1
(Netherlands) R Haase	4	2
26	(Ukraine) A Dolgopolov	6	6
20	(Serbia) V Troicki	5	3
(Argentina) L Mayer	7	6
Q	(United States) R Harrison	4	3
10	(Croatia) M Čilić	6	6

Third round
8	(France) R Gasquet	2	6	6
26	(Ukraine) A Dolgopolov	6	2	1
(Argentina) L Mayer	4	3
10	(Croatia) M Čilić	6	6

Fourth round
8	(France) R Gasquet	5	7	2
10	(Croatia) M Čilić	7	5	6

==== Section 6 ====
First round
WC	(United States) F Tiafoe	6	2	6
WC	(United States) T Fritz	3	6	3
(United Kingdom) K Edmund	7^{7}	4	5
(Argentina) G Pella	6^{3}	6	7
(Russia) A Kuznetsov	6	6
Q	(Argentina) M Trungelliti	4	4
(Ukraine) I Marchenko	7	7^{8}
PR	(Russia) D Tursunov	5	6^{6}

Second round
15	(Belgium) D Goffin	3	6	7^{7}
WC	(United States) F Tiafoe	6	3	6^{2}
(Argentina) G Pella	6	4	6
22	(Uruguay) P Cuevas	1	6	4
28	(France) J Chardy	4	2
(Russia) A Kuznetsov	6	6
(Ukraine) I Marchenko	3	2
3	(Switzerland) S Wawrinka	6	6

Third round
15	(Belgium) D Goffin	4	6	6
(Argentina) G Pella	6	3	2
(Russia) A Kuznetsov	4	6^{5}
3	(Switzerland) S Wawrinka	6	7^{7}

Fourth round
15	(Belgium) D Goffin	6	5	7^{7}
3	(Switzerland) S Wawrinka	3	7	6^{5}

==== Section 7 ====
First round
Q	(United States) T Smyczek	4	0
WC	(Argentina) JM del Potro	6	6
(Croatia) B Ćorić	6	7
(France) L Pouille	2	5
(United States) R Ram	7^{7}	7^{7}
Q	(United States) N Rubin	6^{3}	6^{2}
(Spain) N Almagro	7	3	4
(Spain) I Cervantes	5	6	6

Second round
6	(Czech Republic) T Berdych	7^{7}	6
WC	(Argentina) JM del Potro	6^{4}	2
(Croatia) B Ćorić	6	6
29	(Brazil) T Bellucci	2	2
17	(Australia) B Tomic	6	7
(United States) R Ram	4	5
(Spain) I Cervantes	1	3
12	(Canada) M Raonic	6	6

Third round
6	(Czech Republic) T Berdych	6	7^{7}
(Croatia) B Ćorić	1	6^{3}
17	(Australia) B Tomic	2	0^{r}
12	(Canada) M Raonic	6	3

Fourth round
6	(Czech Republic) T Berdych	4	6^{7}
12	(Canada) M Raonic	6	7^{9}

==== Section 8 ====
First round
(Russia) E Donskoy	3	4
(Spain) P Carreño Busta	6	6
(South Korea) H Chung	6	0	3
(Spain) A Ramos	2	6	6
(Colombia) S Giraldo	3	6^{5}
(Argentina) F Delbonis	6	7^{7}
(Bosnia and Herzegovina) D Džumhur	1	0
(Spain) M Granollers	6	6

Second round
13	(France) G Monfils	7	7^{7}
(Spain) P Carreño Busta	5	6^{1}
(Spain) A Ramos	7^{7}	7
24	(Australia) N Kyrgios	6^{4}	5
32	(Portugal) J Sousa	6^{6}	4
(Argentina) F Delbonis	7^{8}	6
(Spain) M Granollers	4	6^{3}
2	(United Kingdom) A Murray	6	7^{7}

Third round
13	(France) G Monfils	6	6
(Spain) A Ramos	1	3
(Argentina) F Delbonis	6	4	7^{7}
2	(United Kingdom) A Murray	4	6	6^{3}

Fourth round
13	(France) G Monfils	6	6
(Argentina) F Delbonis	3	4

== Qualifying ==
=== Seeds ===
1. (Japan) Yūichi Sugita (qualifying competition)
2. (United States) Austin Krajicek (qualifying competition)
3. (France) Pierre-Hugues Herbert (qualified)
4. (Germany) Michael Berrer (qualified)
5. (United States) Tim Smyczek (qualified)
6. (Australia) John-Patrick Smith (first round)
7. (Japan) Go Soeda (first round)
8. (Germany) Daniel Brands (first round)
9. (France) Édouard Roger-Vasselin (qualifying competition)
10. (Colombia) Alejandro González (first round)
11. (United States) Bjorn Fratangelo (qualified)
12. (United States) Dennis Novikov (qualifying competition)
13. (Russia) Andrey Rublev (qualifying competition)
14. (Germany) Mischa Zverev (qualifying competition)
15. (Czech Republic) Radek Štěpánek (qualifying competition)
16. (France) Vincent Millot (qualified)
17. (Argentina) Renzo Olivo (qualified)
18. (United States) Ryan Harrison (qualified)
19. (United States) Alexander Sarkissian (qualified)
20. (Slovakia) Jozef Kovalík (qualified)
21. (Argentina) Marco Trungelliti (qualified)
22. (Republic of Ireland) James McGee (first round)
23. (United States) Noah Rubin (qualified)
24. (United States) Tommy Paul (qualifying competition)

=== Qualifiers ===
1. (Argentina) Renzo Olivo
2. (France) Vincent Millot
3. (France) Pierre-Hugues Herbert
4. (Germany) Michael Berrer
5. (United States) Tim Smyczek
6. (United States) Ryan Harrison
7. (Canada) Peter Polansky
8. (Slovakia) Jozef Kovalík
9. (Argentina) Marco Trungelliti
10. (United States) Alexander Sarkissian
11. (United States) Bjorn Fratangelo
12. (United States) Noah Rubin

=== Qualifying draw ===
==== First qualifier ====
First round
1	(Japan) Yūichi Sugita	6	6
(Australia) Matt Reid	1	2
(Italy) Salvatore Caruso	4	7^{7}	2
17	(Argentina) Renzo Olivo	6	6^{2}	6

Qualifying competition
1	(Japan) Yūichi Sugita	4	2
17	(Argentina) Renzo Olivo	6	6

==== Second qualifier ====
First round
2	(United States) Austin Krajicek	6	2	7^{7}
(Brazil) Caio Zampieri	1	6	6^{4}
WC	(United States) Nicolas Meister	5	3
16	(France) Vincent Millot	7	6

Qualifying competition
2	(United States) Austin Krajicek	3	4
16	(France) Vincent Millot	6	6

==== Third qualifier ====
First round
3	(France) Pierre-Hugues Herbert	6	6
(Australia) Benjamin Mitchell	3	2
WC	(Brazil) Fernando Romboli	2	3
14	(Germany) Mischa Zverev	6	6

Qualifying competition
3	(France) Pierre-Hugues Herbert	6	7^{7}
14	(Germany) Mischa Zverev	3	6^{3}

==== Fourth qualifier ====
First round
4	(Germany) Michael Berrer	7^{7}	6
(France) Jonathan Eysseric	6^{4}	2
(India) Somdev Devvarman	6	2	5
13	(Russia) Andrey Rublev	3	6	7

Qualifying competition
4	(Germany) Michael Berrer	6	6
13	(Russia) Andrey Rublev	3	2

==== Fifth qualifier ====
First round
5	(United States) Tim Smyczek	7^{7}	2	7
WC	(United States) Michael Mmoh	6^{2}	6	5
(Czech Republic) Marek Michalička	6^{3}	5
24	(United States) Tommy Paul	7^{7}	7

Qualifying competition
5	(United States) Tim Smyczek	3	6	7
24	(United States) Tommy Paul	6	3	5

==== Sixth qualifier ====
First round
6	(Australia) John-Patrick Smith	3	4
(Chinese Taipei) Jason Jung	6	6
(Australia) Matthew Barton	3	3
18	(United States) Ryan Harrison	6	6

Qualifying competition
(Chinese Taipei) Jason Jung	4	6^{2}
18	(United States) Ryan Harrison	6	7^{7}

==== Seventh qualifier ====
First round
7	(Japan) Go Soeda	6	2	3
(El Salvador) Marcelo Arévalo	2	6	6
PR	(Canada) Peter Polansky	7^{7}	6
22	(Republic of Ireland) James McGee	6^{4}	2

Qualifying competition
(El Salvador) Marcelo Arévalo	6	3	2
PR	(Canada) Peter Polansky	3	6	6

==== Eighth qualifier ====
First round
8	(Germany) Daniel Brands	6^{2}	3
(Ecuador) Giovanni Lapentti	7^{7}	6
(Canada) Philip Bester	4	2
20	(Slovakia) Jozef Kovalík	6	6

Qualifying competition
(Ecuador) Giovanni Lapentti	5	6	4
20	(Slovakia) Jozef Kovalík	7	4	6

==== Ninth qualifier ====
First round
9	(France) Édouard Roger-Vasselin	6	1	7^{7}
WC	(United States) Ernesto Escobedo	2	6	6^{5}
(United States) Connor Smith	1	4
21	(Argentina) Marco Trungelliti	6	6

Qualifying competition
9	(France) Édouard Roger-Vasselin	6^{4}	4
21	(Argentina) Marco Trungelliti	7^{7}	6

==== Tenth qualifier ====
First round
10	(Colombia) Alejandro González	6^{4}	4
(United States) Mitchell Krueger	7^{7}	6
(United States) Sekou Bangoura	2	2
19	(United States) Alexander Sarkissian	6	6

Qualifying competition
(United States) Mitchell Krueger	7	4	4
19	(United States) Alexander Sarkissian	5	6	6

==== Eleventh qualifier ====
First round
11	(United States) Bjorn Fratangelo	6	6
(United Kingdom) Joshua Milton	2	2
(Romania) Victor Hănescu	5	6	1
15	(Czech Republic) Radek Štěpánek	7	0	6

Qualifying competition
11	(United States) Bjorn Fratangelo	6	6
15	(Czech Republic) Radek Štěpánek	3	2

==== Twelfth qualifier ====
First round
12	(United States) Dennis Novikov	6	6
(Argentina) Facundo Mena	1	0
WC	(Russia) Mikhail Ledovskikh	4	2
23	(United States) Noah Rubin	6	6

Qualifying competition
12	(United States) Dennis Novikov	5	3
23	(United States) Noah Rubin	7	6
