= 2017 BNP Paribas Open – Men's doubles =

Men's doubles
- 2017 BNP Paribas Open

Final
- Champions: (South Africa) Raven Klaasen (United States) Rajeev Ram
- Runners-up: (Poland) Łukasz Kubot (Brazil) Marcelo Melo
- Score: 6–7^{(1–7)}, 6–4, [10–8]

Events
| Singles | men | women |
| Doubles | men | women |
| ← 2016 · | BNP Paribas Open | · 2018 → |

Pierre-Hugues Herbert and Nicolas Mahut were the defending champions, but lost in the second round to Novak Djokovic and Viktor Troicki.

Raven Klaasen and Rajeev Ram won the title, defeating Łukasz Kubot and Marcelo Melo in the final, 6–7^{(1–7)}, 6–4, [10–8].

== Seeds ==
1. (France) Pierre-Hugues Herbert / (France) Nicolas Mahut (second round)
2. (United States) Bob Bryan / (United States) Mike Bryan (first round)
3. (Finland) Henri Kontinen / (Australia) John Peers (quarterfinals)
4. (United Kingdom) Jamie Murray / (Brazil) Bruno Soares (semifinals)
5. (Spain) Feliciano López / (Spain) Marc López (first round)
6. (South Africa) Raven Klaasen / (United States) Rajeev Ram (champions)
7. (Croatia) Ivan Dodig / (Spain) Marcel Granollers (first round)
8. (Poland) Łukasz Kubot / (Brazil) Marcelo Melo (final)

== Draw ==
=== Key ===
- Q = Qualifier
- WC = Wild card
- LL = Lucky loser
- Alt = Alternate
- ITF = ITF entry
- PR = Protected ranking
- SR = Special ranking
- SE = Special exempt
- JE = Junior exempt
- JR = Junior Accelerator Programme entrant
- CO = College Accelerator Programme entrant
- NG = Next Gen Accelerator Program entrant
- w/o = Walkover
- r = Retired
- d = Defaulted

=== Finals ===
Semifinals
6 | (South Africa) Raven Klaasen (United States) Rajeev Ram | 6 | 6
(Luxembourg) Gilles Müller (United States) Sam Querrey | 2 | 4
4 | (United Kingdom) Jamie Murray (Brazil) Bruno Soares | 6 | 5 | [5]
8 | (Poland) Łukasz Kubot (Brazil) Marcelo Melo | 3 | 7 | [10]

Final
6 | (South Africa) Raven Klaasen (United States) Rajeev Ram | 6^{1} | 6 | [10]
8 | (Poland) Łukasz Kubot (Brazil) Marcelo Melo | 7^{7} | 4 | [8]

=== Top half ===
First round
1 | (France) P-H Herbert (France) N Mahut | 4 | 6 | [10]
(United States) J Isner (United States) J Sock | 6 | 3 | [7]
(Serbia) N Djokovic (Serbia) V Troicki | 2 | 6 | [10]
(India) R Bopanna (Uruguay) P Cuevas | 6 | 3 | [7]
(Spain) R Nadal (Australia) B Tomic | 6 | 7^{9}
(Spain) P Carreño Busta (Portugal) J Sousa | 4 | 6^{7}
Alt | (France) B Paire (New Zealand) M Venus | 3 | 7 | [5]
6 | (South Africa) R Klaasen (United States) R Ram | 6 | 5 | [10]
3 | (Finland) H Kontinen (Australia) J Peers | 7^{7} | 6
(France) F Martin (France) L Pouille | 6^{4} | 4
(Germany) P Kohlschreiber (Austria) D Thiem | 6^{4} | 4
(Germany) A Zverev (Germany) M Zverev | 7^{7} | 6
(Luxembourg) G Müller (United States) S Querrey | 6 | 6
WC | (Argentina) JM del Potro (India) L Paes | 3 | 4
(Romania) F Mergea (Pakistan) A-u-H Qureshi | 2 | 6 | [10]
7 | (Croatia) I Dodig (Spain) M Granollers | 6 | 3 | [4]

Second round
1 | (France) P-H Herbert (France) N Mahut | 7 | 1 | [9]
(Serbia) N Djokovic (Serbia) V Troicki | 5 | 6 | [11]
(Spain) R Nadal (Australia) B Tomic | 6 | 6^{4} | [9]
6 | (South Africa) R Klaasen (United States) R Ram | 3 | 7^{7} | [11]
3 | (Finland) H Kontinen (Australia) J Peers | 6 | 6
(Germany) A Zverev (Germany) M Zverev | 3 | 4
(Luxembourg) G Müller (United States) S Querrey | 6 | 1 | [10]
(Romania) F Mergea (Pakistan) A-u-H Qureshi | 1 | 6 | [6]

Quarterfinals
(Serbia) N Djokovic (Serbia) V Troicki | 6 | 2 | [6]
6 | (South Africa) R Klaasen (United States) R Ram | 3 | 6 | [10]
3 | (Finland) H Kontinen (Australia) J Peers | 7^{7} | 3 | [6]
(Luxembourg) G Müller (United States) S Querrey | 6^{2} | 6 | [10]

Semifinals
6 | (South Africa) R Klaasen (United States) R Ram | 6 | 6
(Luxembourg) G Müller (United States) S Querrey | 2 | 4

=== Bottom half ===
First round
5 | (Spain) F López (Spain) M López | 3 | 6 | [6]
(United Kingdom) D Evans (United Kingdom) A Murray | 6 | 1 | [10]
(Netherlands) J-J Rojer (Romania) H Tecău | 6 | 4 | [10]
(Croatia) M Čilić (Croatia) N Mektić | 2 | 6 | [6]
(Bulgaria) G Dimitrov (Switzerland) S Wawrinka | 4 | 6 | [3]
(Philippines) T Huey (Belarus) M Mirnyi | 6 | 3 | [10]
(Canada) D Nestor (France) É Roger-Vasselin | 7^{7} | 2 | [3]
4 | (United Kingdom) J Murray (Brazil) B Soares | 6^{4} | 6 | [10]
8 | (Poland) Ł Kubot (Brazil) M Melo | 6 | 6
(Italy) P Lorenzi (Spain) A Ramos Viñolas | 2 | 1
(Poland) M Matkowski (Austria) A Peya | 6 | 4 | [9]
(United States) S Johnson (Canada) V Pospisil | 3 | 6 | [11]
(Spain) R Bautista Agut (Spain) F Verdasco | 7^{7} | 4 | [10]
PR | (Czech Republic) T Berdych (Germany) P Petzschner | 6^{5} | 6 | [3]
WC | (Australia) N Kyrgios (Serbia) N Zimonjić | 6 | 3 | [10]
2 | (United States) B Bryan (United States) M Bryan | 4 | 6 | [7]

Second round
(United Kingdom) D Evans (United Kingdom) A Murray | 4 | 3
(Netherlands) J-J Rojer (Romania) H Tecău | 6 | 6
(Philippines) T Huey (Belarus) M Mirnyi | 6^{3} | 3
4 | (United Kingdom) J Murray (Brazil) B Soares | 7^{7} | 6
8 | (Poland) Ł Kubot (Brazil) M Melo | 7^{7} | 6^{4} | [10]
(United States) S Johnson (Canada) V Pospisil | 6^{4} | 7^{7} | [4]
(Spain) R Bautista Agut (Spain) F Verdasco
WC | (Australia) N Kyrgios (Serbia) N Zimonjić | w/o

Quarterfinals
(Netherlands) J-J Rojer (Romania) H Tecău | 6^{5} | 4
4 | (United Kingdom) J Murray (Brazil) B Soares | 7^{7} | 6
8 | (Poland) Ł Kubot (Brazil) M Melo | 6 | 6
WC | (Australia) N Kyrgios (Serbia) N Zimonjić | 1 | 3

Semifinals
4 | (United Kingdom) J Murray (Brazil) B Soares | 6 | 5 | [5]
8 | (Poland) Ł Kubot (Brazil) M Melo | 3 | 7 | [10]
