= 2016 BNP Paribas Open – Men's doubles =

Men's doubles
- 2016 BNP Paribas Open

Final
- Champions: (France) Pierre-Hugues Herbert (France) Nicolas Mahut
- Runners-up: (Canada) Vasek Pospisil (United States) Jack Sock
- Score: 6–3, 7–6^{(7–5)}

Events
Singles	men	women
Doubles	men	women
← 2015 ·	BNP Paribas Open	· 2017 →

Vasek Pospisil and Jack Sock were the defending champions, but lost in the final to Pierre-Hugues Herbert and Nicolas Mahut, 3–6, 6–7^{(5–7)}.

== Seeds ==
1. (Netherlands) Jean-Julien Rojer / (Romania) Horia Tecău (first round)
2. (Croatia) Ivan Dodig / (Brazil) Marcelo Melo (first round)
3. (United States) Bob Bryan / (United States) Mike Bryan (quarterfinals)
4. (United Kingdom) Jamie Murray / (Brazil) Bruno Soares (quarterfinals)
5. (India) Rohan Bopanna / (Romania) Florin Mergea (first round)
6. (Canada) Vasek Pospisil / (United States) Jack Sock (final)
7. (France) Pierre-Hugues Herbert / (France) Nicolas Mahut (champions)
8. (France) Édouard Roger-Vasselin / (Serbia) Nenad Zimonjić (semifinals)

== Draw ==
=== Key ===
- Q = Qualifier
- WC = Wild card
- LL = Lucky loser
- Alt = Alternate
- SE = Special exempt
- PR = Protected ranking
- ITF = ITF entry
- JE = Junior exempt
- w/o = Walkover
- r = Retired
- d = Defaulted
- SR = Special ranking

=== Finals ===
Semifinals
6	(Canada) Vasek Pospisil (United States) Jack Sock	4	6	[12]
(Spain) Feliciano López (Spain) Marc López	6	3	[10]
8	(France) Édouard Roger-Vasselin (Serbia) Nenad Zimonjić	6	3	[6]
7	(France) Pierre-Hugues Herbert (France) Nicolas Mahut	4	6	[10]

Final
6	(Canada) Vasek Pospisil (United States) Jack Sock	3	6^{5}
7	(France) Pierre-Hugues Herbert (France) Nicolas Mahut	6	7^{7}

=== Top half ===
First round
1	(Netherlands) J-J Rojer (Romania) H Tecău	6^{6}	6	[6]
(Poland) Ł Kubot (Poland) M Matkowski	7^{8}	3	[10]
(France) R Gasquet (France) B Paire	3	6	[4]
(Germany) P Kohlschreiber (Austria) D Thiem	6	4	[10]
(Finland) H Kontinen (Australia) J Peers	6^{6}	5
(Brazil) T Bellucci (Argentina) G Pella	7^{8}	7
(Pakistan) A-u-H Qureshi (France) G Simon	0	5
6	(Canada) V Pospisil (United States) J Sock	6	7
4	(United Kingdom) J Murray (Brazil) B Soares	6	6^{5}	[11]
(Philippines) T Huey (Slovakia) M Kližan	4	7^{7}	[9]
(Colombia) JS Cabal (Colombia) R Farah	3	1^{r}
(United Kingdom) D Inglot (Sweden) R Lindstedt	6	3
(United States) J Isner (Canada) M Raonic	7	6^{5}	[10]
(United Kingdom) C Fleming (United Kingdom) A Murray	5	7^{7}	[8]
(Spain) F López (Spain) M López	2	6	[10]
5	(India) R Bopanna (Romania) F Mergea	6	4	[4]

Second round
(Poland) Ł Kubot (Poland) M Matkowski	2	6	[5]
(Germany) P Kohlschreiber (Austria) D Thiem	6	4	[10]
(Brazil) T Bellucci (Argentina) G Pella	3	7^{8}	[5]
6	(Canada) V Pospisil (United States) J Sock	6	6^{6}	[10]
4	(United Kingdom) J Murray (Brazil) B Soares	4	6	[10]
(United Kingdom) D Inglot (Sweden) R Lindstedt	6	3	[4]
(United States) J Isner (Canada) M Raonic	4	5
(Spain) F López (Spain) M López	6	7

Quarterfinals
(Germany) P Kohlschreiber (Austria) D Thiem	5	3
6	(Canada) V Pospisil (United States) J Sock	7	6
4	(United Kingdom) J Murray (Brazil) B Soares	7^{7}	6^{2}	[8]
(Spain) F López (Spain) M López	6^{2}	7^{7}	[10]

Semifinals
6	(Canada) V Pospisil (United States) J Sock	4	6	[12]
(Spain) F López (Spain) M López	6	3	[10]

=== Bottom half ===
First round
8	(France) É Roger-Vasselin (Serbia) N Zimonjić	6	6^{6}	[17]
Alt	(Czech Republic) M Michalička (Czech Republic) I Minář	3	7^{8}	[15]
(Belgium) D Goffin (Portugal) J Sousa	6	4	[10]
(Spain) D Marrero (Australia) B Tomic	1	6	[6]
(Spain) R Bautista Agut (Serbia) V Troicki	2	6	[10]
(Uruguay) P Cuevas (Spain) M Granollers	6	3	[4]
(Spain) R Nadal (Spain) F Verdasco	6	5	[8]
3	(United States) B Bryan (United States) M Bryan	3	7	[10]
7	(France) P-H Herbert (France) N Mahut	7^{7}	6
(Bulgaria) G Dimitrov (Belarus) M Mirnyi	6^{5}	2
(Canada) D Nestor (Czech Republic) R Štěpánek	6	6
(South Africa) R Klaasen (United States) R Ram	3	2
Alt	(France) J Chardy (France) F Martin	6	6
(United States) S Johnson (United States) S Querrey	4	3
PR	(Argentina) JM del Potro (Argentina) L Mayer	6	6
2	(Croatia) I Dodig (Brazil) M Melo	3	2

Second round
8	(France) É Roger-Vasselin (Serbia) N Zimonjić	6	6
(Belgium) D Goffin (Portugal) J Sousa	1	3
(Spain) R Bautista Agut (Serbia) V Troicki	2	2
3	(United States) B Bryan (United States) M Bryan	6	6
7	(France) P-H Herbert (France) N Mahut	4	6	[10]
(Canada) D Nestor (Czech Republic) R Štěpánek	6	4	[5]
Alt	(France) J Chardy (France) F Martin	6^{5}	6	[10]
PR	(Argentina) JM del Potro (Argentina) L Mayer	7^{7}	3	[6]

Quarterfinals
8	(France) É Roger-Vasselin (Serbia) N Zimonjić	4	6	[14]
3	(United States) B Bryan (United States) M Bryan	6	1	[12]
7	(France) P-H Herbert (France) N Mahut	6	7
Alt	(France) J Chardy (France) F Martin	1	5

Semifinals
8	(France) É Roger-Vasselin (Serbia) N Zimonjić	6	3	[6]
7	(France) P-H Herbert (France) N Mahut	4	6	[10]
