= 2017 BNP Paribas Open – Women's doubles =

Women's doubles
- 2017 BNP Paribas Open

Final
- Champions: (Chinese Taipei) Chan Yung-jan (Switzerland) Martina Hingis
- Runners-up: (Czech Republic) Lucie Hradecká (Czech Republic) Kateřina Siniaková
- Score: 7–6^{(7–4)}, 6–2

Events
Singles	men	women
Doubles	men	women
← 2016 ·	BNP Paribas Open	· 2018 →

Bethanie Mattek-Sands and Coco Vandeweghe were the defending champions, but chose not to participate together. Mattek-Sands played alongside Lucie Šafářová, but lost in the semifinals to Chan Yung-jan and Martina Hingis. Vandeweghe teamed up with Shelby Rogers, but lost in the first round to Andreja Klepač and María José Martínez Sánchez.

Chan and Hingis went on to win the title, defeating Lucie Hradecká and Kateřina Siniaková in the final, 7–6^{(7–4)}, 6–2.

== Seeds ==
1. (United States) Bethanie Mattek-Sands / (Czech Republic) Lucie Šafářová (semifinals)
2. (Russia) Ekaterina Makarova / (Russia) Elena Vesnina (semifinals)
3. (France) Caroline Garcia / (Czech Republic) Karolína Plíšková (first round)
4. (India) Sania Mirza / (Czech Republic) Barbora Strýcová (quarterfinals)
5. (Czech Republic) Andrea Hlaváčková / (China) Peng Shuai (second round)
6. (Chinese Taipei) Chan Yung-jan / (Switzerland) Martina Hingis (champions)
7. (United States) Vania King / (Kazakhstan) Yaroslava Shvedova (second round)
8. (United States) Abigail Spears / (Slovenia) Katarina Srebotnik (first round)

== Draw ==
=== Key ===
- Q = Qualifier
- WC = Wild card
- LL = Lucky loser
- Alt = Alternate
- SE = Special exempt
- PR = Protected ranking
- ITF = ITF entry
- JE = Junior exempt
- w/o = Walkover
- r = Retired
- d = Defaulted
- SR = Special ranking

=== Finals ===
Semifinals
1	(United States) Bethanie Mattek-Sands (Czech Republic) Lucie Šafářová	6^{7}	5
6	(Chinese Taipei) Chan Yung-jan (Switzerland) Martina Hingis	7^{9}	7
(Czech Republic) Lucie Hradecká (Czech Republic) Kateřina Siniaková	6	6
2	(Russia) Ekaterina Makarova (Russia) Elena Vesnina	3	3

Final
6	(Chinese Taipei) Chan Yung-jan (Switzerland) Martina Hingis	7^{7}	6
(Czech Republic) Lucie Hradecká (Czech Republic) Kateřina Siniaková	6^{4}	2

=== Top half ===
First round
1	(United States) B Mattek-Sands (Czech Republic) L Šafářová	6	3	[10]
(United States) C McHale (Romania) M Niculescu	3	6	[7]
(Netherlands) K Bertens (Sweden) J Larsson	6	6
(Romania) R Olaru (Ukraine) O Savchuk	1	1
(Russia) S Kuznetsova (France) K Mladenovic	6	6
(Germany) A-L Grönefeld (Czech Republic) K Peschke	4	1
(Croatia) D Jurak (Australia) An Rodionova	5	1
5	(Czech Republic) A Hlaváčková (China) S Peng	7	6
4	(India) S Mirza (Czech Republic) B Strýcová	6	6
(Germany) J Görges (Latvia) J Ostapenko	3	4
(Italy) S Errani (Poland) A Rosolska	6	6
(United States) A Muhammad (Czech Republic) R Voráčová	1	4
(Slovenia) A Klepač (Spain) MJ Martínez Sánchez	6	1	[10]
WC	(United States) S Rogers (United States) C Vandeweghe	1	6	[7]
(United States) R Atawo (China) Y Xu	1	4
6	(Chinese Taipei) Y-j Chan (Switzerland) M Hingis	6	6

Second round
1	(United States) B Mattek-Sands (Czech Republic) L Šafářová	6	7
(Netherlands) K Bertens (Sweden) J Larsson	1	5
(Russia) S Kuznetsova (France) K Mladenovic	6	7
5	(Czech Republic) A Hlaváčková (China) S Peng	2	5
4	(India) S Mirza (Czech Republic) B Strýcová	6	6
(Italy) S Errani (Poland) A Rosolska	2	3
(Slovenia) A Klepač (Spain) MJ Martínez Sánchez	1	5
6	(Chinese Taipei) Y-j Chan (Switzerland) M Hingis	6	7

Quarterfinals
1	(United States) B Mattek-Sands (Czech Republic) L Šafářová	6	3	[10]
(Russia) S Kuznetsova (France) K Mladenovic	3	6	[8]
4	(India) S Mirza (Czech Republic) B Strýcová	4	4
6	(Chinese Taipei) Y-j Chan (Switzerland) M Hingis	6	6

Semifinals
1	(United States) B Mattek-Sands (Czech Republic) L Šafářová	6^{7}	5
6	(Chinese Taipei) Y-j Chan (Switzerland) M Hingis	7^{9}	7

=== Bottom half ===
First round
8	(United States) A Spears (Slovenia) K Srebotnik	6^{5}	4
(Switzerland) T Bacsinszky (Croatia) M Lučić-Baroni	7^{7}	6
(Canada) G Dabrowski (United Kingdom) H Watson	6	3	[1]
(Czech Republic) L Hradecká (Czech Republic) K Siniaková	4	6	[10]
(Germany) L Siegemund (Ukraine) E Svitolina	7	6^{5}	[4]
(Ukraine) K Bondarenko (Chinese Taipei) H-c Chan	5	7^{7}	[10]
(Spain) L Arruabarrena (China) C Liang	6	1	[13]
3/WC	(France) C Garcia (Czech Republic) Ka Plíšková	4	6	[11]
7	(United States) V King (Kazakhstan) Y Shvedova	7	6
(Hungary) T Babos (Russia) A Pavlyuchenkova	5	2
(Japan) S Aoyama (China) Z Yang	6	2	[10]
WC	(Australia) A Barty (Australia) C Dellacqua	4	6	[4]
(Australia) S Stosur (China) S Zhang	6	6
(Argentina) M Irigoyen (United States) M Moulton-Levy	2	3
(Georgia (country)) O Kalashnikova (United States) M Sanchez	6^{3}	6^{6}
2	(Russia) E Makarova (Russia) E Vesnina	7^{7}	7^{8}

Second round
(Switzerland) T Bacsinszky (Croatia) M Lučić-Baroni	1	4
(Czech Republic) L Hradecká (Czech Republic) K Siniaková	6	6
(Ukraine) K Bondarenko (Chinese Taipei) H-c Chan	4	6	[8]
(Spain) L Arruabarrena (China) C Liang	6	2	[10]
7	(United States) V King (Kazakhstan) Y Shvedova	3	7^{7}	[8]
(Japan) S Aoyama (China) Z Yang	6	6^{5}	[10]
(Australia) S Stosur (China) S Zhang	2	4
2	(Russia) E Makarova (Russia) E Vesnina	6	6

Quarterfinals
(Czech Republic) L Hradecká (Czech Republic) K Siniaková	6	6
(Spain) L Arruabarrena (China) C Liang	4	0
(Japan) S Aoyama (China) Z Yang	2	1
2	(Russia) E Makarova (Russia) E Vesnina	6	6

Semifinals
(Czech Republic) L Hradecká (Czech Republic) K Siniaková	6	6
2	(Russia) E Makarova (Russia) E Vesnina	3	3
