= 2016 BNP Paribas Open – Women's doubles =

Women's doubles
- 2016 BNP Paribas Open

Final
- Champions: (United States) Bethanie Mattek-Sands (United States) Coco Vandeweghe
- Runners-up: (Germany) Julia Görges (Czech Republic) Karolína Plíšková
- Score: 4–6, 6–4, [10–6]

Events
Singles	men	women
Doubles	men	women
← 2015 ·	BNP Paribas Open	· 2017 →

Martina Hingis and Sania Mirza were the defending champions, but lost in the second round to Vania King and Alla Kudryavtseva.
Bethanie Mattek-Sands and Coco Vandeweghe won the title, defeating Julia Görges and Karolína Plíšková in the final, 4–6, 6–4, [10–6].

== Seeds ==
1. (Switzerland) Martina Hingis / (India) Sania Mirza (second round)
2. (Chinese Taipei) Chan Hao-ching / (Chinese Taipei) Chan Yung-jan (second round)
3. (Hungary) Tímea Babos / (Kazakhstan) Yaroslava Shvedova (semifinals)
4. (Czech Republic) Andrea Hlaváčková / (Czech Republic) Lucie Hradecká (quarterfinals)
5. (Russia) Ekaterina Makarova / (Czech Republic) Lucie Šafářová (first round)
6. (France) Caroline Garcia / (France) Kristina Mladenovic (withdrew due to Garcia's back injury)
7. (Spain) Garbiñe Muguruza / (Spain) Carla Suárez Navarro (first round)
8. (United States) Raquel Atawo / (United States) Abigail Spears (quarterfinals)

== Draw ==
=== Key ===
- Q = Qualifier
- WC = Wild card
- LL = Lucky loser
- Alt = Alternate
- SE = Special exempt
- PR = Protected ranking
- ITF = ITF entry
- JE = Junior exempt
- w/o = Walkover
- r = Retired
- d = Defaulted
- SR = Special ranking

=== Finals ===
Semifinals
(Germany) Julia Görges (Czech Republic) Karolína Plíšková	6	6
(Italy) Sara Errani (Georgia (country)) Oksana Kalashnikova	4	3
3	(Hungary) Tímea Babos (Kazakhstan) Yaroslava Shvedova	6	4	[4]
(United States) Bethanie Mattek-Sands (United States) Coco Vandeweghe	2	6	[10]

Final
(Germany) Julia Görges (Czech Republic) Karolína Plíšková	6	4	[6]
(United States) Bethanie Mattek-Sands (United States) Coco Vandeweghe	4	6	[10]

=== Top half ===
First round
1	(Switzerland) M Hingis (India) S Mirza	6	7
(Australia) C Dellacqua (Australia) S Stosur	3	5
(United States) V King (Russia) A Kudryavtseva	4	6	[10]
(Germany) A-L Grönefeld (Czech Republic) B Strýcová	6	3	[5]
(Russia) D Kasatkina (Russia) E Vesnina	6	6
(Australia) An Rodionova (Kazakhstan) G Voskoboeva	4	3
(Germany) J Görges (Czech Republic) Ka Plíšková	6	6
7	(Spain) G Muguruza (Spain) C Suárez Navarro	4	2
4	(Czech Republic) A Hlaváčková (Czech Republic) L Hradecká	6	6
WC	(Belgium) K Flipkens (Serbia) A Ivanovic	2	2
(Russia) M Gasparyan (Romania) M Niculescu	6	6
(Chinese Taipei) C-j Chuang (China) C Liang	4	1
(Italy) S Errani (Georgia (country)) O Kalashnikova	6	6
(Chinese Taipei) S-w Hsieh (China) S Peng	0	2
(Spain) A Medina Garrigues (Spain) A Parra Santonja	6^{2}	1
Alt	(Ukraine) K Bondarenko (Ukraine) O Savchuk	7^{7}	6

Second round
1	(Switzerland) M Hingis (India) S Mirza	6^{7}	4
(United States) V King (Russia) A Kudryavtseva	7^{9}	6
(Russia) D Kasatkina (Russia) E Vesnina	1	7^{7}	[4]
(Germany) J Görges (Czech Republic) Ka Plíšková	6	6^{5}	[10]
4	(Czech Republic) A Hlaváčková (Czech Republic) L Hradecká	7	6
(Russia) M Gasparyan (Romania) M Niculescu	5	2
(Italy) S Errani (Georgia (country)) O Kalashnikova	7^{7}	5	[10]
Alt	(Ukraine) K Bondarenko (Ukraine) O Savchuk	6^{5}	7	[8]

Quarterfinals
(United States) V King (Russia) A Kudryavtseva	4	3
(Germany) J Görges (Czech Republic) Ka Plíšková	6	6
4	(Czech Republic) A Hlaváčková (Czech Republic) L Hradecká	6	3	[5]
(Italy) S Errani (Georgia (country)) O Kalashnikova	3	6	[10]

Semifinals
(Germany) J Görges (Czech Republic) Ka Plíšková	6	6
(Italy) S Errani (Georgia (country)) O Kalashnikova	4	3

=== Bottom half ===
First round
5	(Russia) E Makarova (Czech Republic) L Šafářová	1	2
(Slovenia) A Klepač (Slovenia) K Srebotnik	6	6
WC	(Russia) S Kuznetsova (Russia) A Pavlyuchenkova	2	4
(Netherlands) K Bertens (Sweden) J Larsson	6	6
(China) Y Xu (China) S Zheng	7	7^{7}
(Poland) K Jans-Ignacik (Poland) A Rosolska	5	6^{1}
(Croatia) D Jurak (Germany) L Siegemund	4	2
3	(Hungary) T Babos (Kazakhstan) Y Shvedova	6	6
8	(United States) R Atawo (United States) A Spears	6	6
(Russia) V Dushevina (Czech Republic) K Siniaková	3	4
(Romania) I-C Begu (Romania) R Olaru	2	6^{5}
WC	(Czech Republic) D Allertová (Czech Republic) P Kvitová	6	7^{7}
(United States) B Mattek-Sands (United States) C Vandeweghe	7^{7}	7
(Canada) G Dabrowski (Spain) MJ Martínez Sánchez	6^{4}	5
WC	(Germany) A Kerber (Germany) A Petkovic	4	3
2	(Chinese Taipei) H-c Chan (Chinese Taipei) Y-j Chan	6	6

Second round
(Slovenia) A Klepač (Slovenia) K Srebotnik	5	7	[10]
(Netherlands) K Bertens (Sweden) J Larsson	7	5	[6]
(China) Y Xu (China) S Zheng	4	5
3	(Hungary) T Babos (Kazakhstan) Y Shvedova	6	7
8	(United States) R Atawo (United States) A Spears	6	6
WC	(Czech Republic) D Allertová (Czech Republic) P Kvitová	3	2
(United States) B Mattek-Sands (United States) C Vandeweghe	7^{7}	6
2	(Chinese Taipei) H-c Chan (Chinese Taipei) Y-j Chan	6^{3}	3

Quarterfinals
(Slovenia) A Klepač (Slovenia) K Srebotnik	7	4	[3]
3	(Hungary) T Babos (Kazakhstan) Y Shvedova	5	6	[10]
8	(United States) R Atawo (United States) A Spears	5	1
(United States) B Mattek-Sands (United States) C Vandeweghe	7	6

Semifinals
3	(Hungary) T Babos (Kazakhstan) Y Shvedova	6	4	[4]
(United States) B Mattek-Sands (United States) C Vandeweghe	2	6	[10]
