= 2017 BNP Paribas Open – Men's singles =

Tennis tournament

Men's singles
- 2017 BNP Paribas Open

Final
- Champion: (Switzerland) Roger Federer
- Runner-up: (Switzerland) Stan Wawrinka
- Score: 6–4, 7–5

Details
- Draw: 96 (12 Q / 5 WC )
- Seeds: 32

Events
Singles	men	women
Doubles	men	women
- Indian Wells Masters

Roger Federer defeated Stan Wawrinka in the final, 6–4, 7–5 to win the men's singles tennis title at the 2017 Indian Wells Masters. It was his record-equaling fifth Indian Wells title, 25th Masters 1000 singles title, and 90th career singles title overall. He did not lose a set during the tournament.

Novak Djokovic was the three-time defending champion, but lost in the fourth round to Nick Kyrgios.

== Seeds ==
All seeds receive a bye into the second round.

1. (United Kingdom) Andy Murray (second round)
2. (Serbia) Novak Djokovic (fourth round)
3. (Switzerland) Stan Wawrinka (final)
4. (Japan) Kei Nishikori (quarterfinals)
5. (Spain) Rafael Nadal (fourth round)
6. (Croatia) Marin Čilić (second round)
7. (France) Jo-Wilfried Tsonga (second round)
8. (Austria) Dominic Thiem (quarterfinals)
9. (Switzerland) Roger Federer (champion)
10. (France) Gaël Monfils (fourth round)
11. (Belgium) David Goffin (fourth round)
12. (Bulgaria) Grigor Dimitrov (third round)
13. (Czech Republic) Tomáš Berdych (third round)
14. (France) Lucas Pouille (third round)
15. (Australia) Nick Kyrgios (quarterfinals, withdrew due to illness)
16. (Spain) Roberto Bautista Agut (third round, withdrew due to an abdominal injury)

17. (United States) Jack Sock (semifinals)
18. (Germany) Alexander Zverev (third round)
19. (Croatia) Ivo Karlović (second round)
20. (United States) John Isner (third round)
21. (Spain) Pablo Carreño Busta (semifinals)
22. (Spain) Albert Ramos Viñolas (third round)
23. (United States) Sam Querrey (second round)
24. (United States) Steve Johnson (third round)
25. (Luxembourg) Gilles Müller (third round)
26. (Spain) Fernando Verdasco (third round)
27. (Uruguay) Pablo Cuevas (quarterfinals)
28. (Germany) Philipp Kohlschreiber (third round)
29. (Germany) Mischa Zverev (third round)
30. (Spain) Feliciano López (second round)
31. (Argentina) Juan Martín del Potro (third round)
32. (Spain) Marcel Granollers (second round)

Click on the seed number of a player to go to their draw section.

== Draw ==
Key

- Q = Qualifier
- WC = Wild card
- LL = Lucky loser
- Alt = Alternate
- ITF = ITF entry
- PR = Protected ranking
- SR = Special ranking
- SE = Special exempt
- JE = Junior exempt
- JR = Junior Accelerator Programme entrant
- CO = College Accelerator Programme entrant
- NG = Next Gen Accelerator Program entrant
- w/o = Walkover
- r = Retired
- d = Defaulted

=== Finals ===
Quarterfinals
21	(Spain) Pablo Carreño Busta	6	3	7^{7}
27	(Uruguay) Pablo Cuevas	1	6	6^{4}
3	(Switzerland) Stan Wawrinka	6	4	7^{7}
8	(Austria) Dominic Thiem	4	6	6^{2}
17	(United States) Jack Sock	6	2	6
4	(Japan) Kei Nishikori	3	6	2
9	(Switzerland) Roger Federer	w/o
15	(Australia) Nick Kyrgios

Semifinals
21	(Spain) Pablo Carreño Busta	3	2
3	(Switzerland) Stan Wawrinka	6	6
17	(United States) Jack Sock	1	6^{4}
9	(Switzerland) Roger Federer	6	7^{7}

Final
3	(Switzerland) Stan Wawrinka	4	5
9	(Switzerland) Roger Federer	6	7

=== Top half ===
==== Section 1 ====
First round
Q	(Canada) V Pospisil	6^{6}	6	6
(Chinese Taipei) Y-h Lu	7^{8}	4	3
Q	(Serbia) D Lajović	6	6
WC	(United States) F Tiafoe	3	3
Q	(Germany) P Gojowczyk	6	3	6
WC	(United States) R Opelka	4	6	1
(Argentina) J Mónaco	3	7^{7}	1
(France) A Mannarino	6	6^{5}	6

Second round
1	(United Kingdom) A Murray	4	6^{5}
Q	(Canada) V Pospisil	6	7^{7}
Q	(Serbia) D Lajović	6	4	7^{7}
30	(Spain) F López	2	6	6^{2}
21	(Spain) P Carreño Busta	7	6
Q	(Germany) P Gojowczyk	5	2
(France) A Mannarino	5	2
16	(Spain) R Bautista Agut	7	6

Third round
Q	(Canada) V Pospisil	7^{7}	3	5
Q	(Serbia) D Lajović	6^{4}	6	7
21	(Spain) P Carreño Busta	w/o
16	(Spain) R Bautista Agut

Fourth round
Q	(Serbia) D Lajović	4	6^{5}
21	(Spain) P Carreño Busta	6	7^{7}

==== Section 2 ====
First round
PR	(Spain) T Robredo	1	5
(Russia) K Khachanov	6	7
(Bosnia and Herzegovina) D Džumhur	6	3	7
(United States) R Harrison	4	6	5
(Slovakia) M Kližan	7^{8}	6
(Brazil) T Monteiro	6^{6}	3
(Italy) F Fognini	0	7	6
(Russia) K Kravchuk	6	5	4

Second round
11	(Belgium) D Goffin	6	3	6
(Russia) K Khachanov	4	6	3
(Bosnia and Herzegovina) D Džumhur	4	7	5
22	(Spain) A Ramos Viñolas	6	5	7
27	(Uruguay) P Cuevas	7^{7}	7^{7}
(Slovakia) M Kližan	6^{3}	6^{5}
(Italy) F Fognini	7^{7}	3	6
7	(France) J-W Tsonga	6^{4}	6	4

Third round
11	(Belgium) D Goffin	7^{7}	6
22	(Spain) A Ramos Viñolas	6^{3}	4
27	(Uruguay) P Cuevas	6	6
(Italy) F Fognini	1	4

Fourth round
11	(Belgium) D Goffin	3	6	3
27	(Uruguay) P Cuevas	6	3	6

==== Section 3 ====
First round
(Netherlands) R Haase	4	3
(Italy) P Lorenzi	6	6
(Ukraine) A Dolgopolov	6	6
(Serbia) V Troicki	1	4
LL	(Japan) Y Nishioka	6	6
Q	(Sweden) E Ymer	4	1
WC	(United States) B Fratangelo	6	6
(Australia) B Tomic	2	2

Second round
3	(Switzerland) S Wawrinka	6	6
(Italy) P Lorenzi	3	4
(Ukraine) A Dolgopolov	7^{7}	1^{r}
28	(Germany) P Kohlschreiber	6^{3}	1
19	(Croatia) I Karlović	4	3
LL	(Japan) Y Nishioka	6	6
WC	(United States) B Fratangelo	6^{4}	4
13	(Czech Republic) T Berdych	7^{7}	6

Third round
3	(Switzerland) S Wawrinka	7	6
28	(Germany) P Kohlschreiber	5	3
LL	(Japan) Y Nishioka	1	7^{7}	6
13	(Czech Republic) T Berdych	6	6^{5}	4

Fourth round
3	(Switzerland) S Wawrinka	3	6	7^{7}
LL	(Japan) Y Nishioka	6	3	6^{4}

==== Section 4 ====
First round
Q	(Georgia (country)) N Basilashvili	5	5
Q	(Barbados) D King	7	7
(Australia) J Thompson	6	1	0^{r}
LL	(Kazakhstan) M Kukushkin	1	6	3
(Portugal) J Sousa	4	6	6
(Argentina) D Schwartzman	6	3	4
Q	(Moldova) R Albot	6^{2}	2
(France) J Chardy	7^{7}	6

Second round
10	(France) G Monfils	3	6	6
Q	(Barbados) D King	6	0	1
LL	(Kazakhstan) M Kukushkin	6^{0}	6^{6}
20	(United States) J Isner	7^{7}	7^{8}
29	(Germany) M Zverev	6	6
(Portugal) J Sousa	4	3
(France) J Chardy	2	4
8	(Austria) D Thiem	6	6

Third round
10	(France) G Monfils	6	6
20	(United States) J Isner	2	4
29	(Germany) M Zverev	1	4
8	(Austria) D Thiem	6	6

Fourth round
10	(France) G Monfils	3	2
8	(Austria) D Thiem	6	6

=== Bottom half ===
==== Section 5 ====
First round
(France) B Paire	3	2
WC	(United States) T Fritz	6	6
(France) N Mahut	3	2
(Tunisia) M Jaziri	6	6
Q	(Switzerland) H Laaksonen	3	6	6
(Croatia) B Ćorić	6	4	2
(Russia) D Medvedev	4	4
(Russia) M Youzhny	6	6

Second round
6	(Croatia) M Čilić	6	5	4
WC	(United States) T Fritz	4	7	6
(Tunisia) M Jaziri	7	6
32	(Spain) M Granollers	5	3
17	(United States) J Sock	6	0	6
Q	(Switzerland) H Laaksonen	3	6	4
(Russia) M Youzhny	4	0
12	(Bulgaria) G Dimitrov	6	6

Third round
WC	(United States) T Fritz	4	6	3
(Tunisia) M Jaziri	6	3	6
17	(United States) J Sock	3	6	7^{9}
12	(Bulgaria) G Dimitrov	6	3	6^{7}

Fourth round
(Tunisia) M Jaziri	6	6^{1}	5
17	(United States) J Sock	4	7^{7}	7

==== Section 6 ====
First round
Q	(Colombia) S Giraldo	3	4
(Germany) J-L Struff	6	6
(United States) D Young	7	7^{7}
WC	(United States) S Kozlov	5	6^{5}
(Argentina) R Olivo	4	6	1
(Czech Republic) J Veselý	6	2	6
(Germany) D Brown	1	1
(United Kingdom) D Evans	6	6

Second round
14	(France) L Pouille	6	6
(Germany) J-L Struff	3	2
(United States) D Young	6	3	6
23	(United States) S Querrey	3	6	3
25	(Luxembourg) G Müller	7^{7}	6
(Czech Republic) J Veselý	6^{1}	1
(United Kingdom) D Evans	3	4
4	(Japan) K Nishikori	6	6

Third round
14	(France) L Pouille	4	6	3
(United States) D Young	6	1	6
25	(Luxembourg) G Müller	2	2
4	(Japan) K Nishikori	6	6

Fourth round
(United States) D Young	2	4
4	(Japan) K Nishikori	6	6

==== Section 7 ====
First round
(Spain) G García López	6	5	2
(Argentina) G Pella	4	7	6
(France) P-H Herbert	7^{7}	6^{1}	6
(Brazil) T Bellucci	6^{5}	7^{7}	3
(South Africa) K Anderson	6	6
Q	(Italy) F Gaio	1	4
(France) S Robert	6	6
(Israel) D Sela	4	4

Second round
5	(Spain) R Nadal	6	6
(Argentina) G Pella	3	2
(France) P-H Herbert	6^{5}	1
26	(Spain) F Verdasco	7^{7}	6
24	(United States) S Johnson	6	3	7^{7}
(South Africa) K Anderson	4	6	6^{4}
(France) S Robert	2	1
9	(Switzerland) R Federer	6	6

Third round
5	(Spain) R Nadal	6	7
26	(Spain) F Verdasco	3	5
24	(United States) S Johnson	6^{3}	6^{4}
9	(Switzerland) R Federer	7^{7}	7^{7}

Fourth round
5	(Spain) R Nadal	2	3
9	(Switzerland) R Federer	6	6

==== Section 8 ====
First round
Q	(Romania) M Copil	7^{7}	6^{2}	4
(Argentina) H Zeballos	6^{5}	7^{7}	6
Q	(France) J Benneteau	7	4	2
(Argentina) F Bagnis	5	6	6
(Argentina) F Delbonis	6	6
(Russia) A Kuznetsov	3	4
(United Kingdom) K Edmund	6	6
(Portugal) G Elias	1	3

Second round
15	(Australia) N Kyrgios	6	6
(Argentina) H Zeballos	3	4
(Argentina) F Bagnis	6^{10}	3
18	(Germany) A Zverev	7^{12}	6
31	(Argentina) JM del Potro	7^{7}	6
(Argentina) F Delbonis	6^{5}	3
(United Kingdom) K Edmund	4	6^{5}
2	(Serbia) N Djokovic	6	7^{7}

Third round
15	(Australia) N Kyrgios	6	6
18	(Germany) A Zverev	3	4
31	(Argentina) JM del Potro	5	6	1
2	(Serbia) N Djokovic	7	4	6

Fourth round
15	(Australia) N Kyrgios	6	7^{7}
2	(Serbia) N Djokovic	4	6^{3}

== Qualifying ==
=== Seeds ===
1. (Georgia (country)) Nikoloz Basilashvili (qualified)
2. (Uzbekistan) Denis Istomin (first round, retired)
3. (Japan) Yoshihito Nishioka (qualifying competition, lucky loser)
4. (Moldova) Radu Albot (qualified)
5. (Kazakhstan) Mikhail Kukushkin (qualifying competition, lucky loser)
6. (United States) Jared Donaldson (first round)
7. (Colombia) Santiago Giraldo (qualified)
8. (United States) Ernesto Escobedo (first round)
9. (Serbia) Dušan Lajović (qualified)
10. (Ukraine) Illya Marchenko (qualifying competition)
11. (Ukraine) Sergiy Stakhovsky (first round)
12. (Romania) Marius Copil (qualified)
13. (Slovakia) Norbert Gombos (qualifying competition)
14. (France) Julien Benneteau (qualified)
15. (Slovakia) Jozef Kovalík (first round)
16. (Switzerland) Henri Laaksonen (qualified)
17. (Canada) Peter Polansky (first round)
18. (Canada) Vasek Pospisil (qualified)
19. (United States) Denis Kudla (qualifying competition)'
20. (Barbados) Darian King (qualified)
21. (Germany) Tobias Kamke (qualifying competition)
22. (Russia) Andrey Rublev (first round)
23. (Kazakhstan) Alexander Bublik (qualifying competition)
24. (Japan) Go Soeda (first round)

=== Qualifiers ===
1. (Georgia (country)) Nikoloz Basilashvili
2. (Switzerland) Henri Laaksonen
3. (Sweden) Elias Ymer
4. (Moldova) Radu Albot
5. (Barbados) Darian King
6. (Canada) Vasek Pospisil
7. (Colombia) Santiago Giraldo
8. (Germany) Peter Gojowczyk
9. (Serbia) Dušan Lajović
10. (France) Julien Benneteau
11. (Italy) Federico Gaio
12. (Romania) Marius Copil

=== Lucky losers ===
1. (Japan) Yoshihito Nishioka
2. (Kazakhstan) Mikhail Kukushkin

=== Qualifying draw ===
==== First qualifier ====
First round
1	(Georgia (country)) Nikoloz Basilashvili	6	6
PR	(Australia) Matthew Ebden	4	2
PR	(Latvia) Ernests Gulbis	4	6^{5}
23	(Kazakhstan) Alexander Bublik	6	7^{7}

Qualifying competition
1	(Georgia (country)) Nikoloz Basilashvili	6	7^{7}
23	(Kazakhstan) Alexander Bublik	3	6^{3}

==== Second qualifier ====
First round
2	(Uzbekistan) Denis Istomin	6^{6}	2^{r}
(United States) Dennis Novikov	7^{8}	4
(United States) Tim Smyczek	6^{3}	3
16	(Switzerland) Henri Laaksonen	7^{7}	6

Qualifying competition
(United States) Dennis Novikov	6	4	0
16	(Switzerland) Henri Laaksonen	4	6	6

==== Third qualifier ====
First round
3	(Japan) Yoshihito Nishioka	6	6
(El Salvador) Marcelo Arévalo	2	4
(Sweden) Elias Ymer	7^{5}	6
17	(Canada) Peter Polansky	6	3

Qualifying competition
3	(Japan) Yoshihito Nishioka	3	1
(Sweden) Elias Ymer	6	6

==== Fourth qualifier ====
First round
4	(Moldova) Radu Albot	7^{7}	6
(France) Vincent Millot	6^{4}	2
WC	(Australia) Alex de Minaur	6	2	6
24	(Japan) Go Soeda	3	6	3

Qualifying competition
4	(Moldova) Radu Albot	6	3	6
WC	(Australia) Alex de Minaur	3	6	4

==== Fifth qualifier ====
First round
5	(Kazakhstan) Mikhail Kukushkin	6	6
WC	(United States) Marcos Giron	3	3
(United States) Noah Rubin	4	4
20	(Barbados) Darian King	6	6

Qualifying competition
5	(Kazakhstan) Mikhail Kukushkin	1	4
20	(Barbados) Darian King	6	6

==== Sixth qualifier ====
First round
6	(United States) Jared Donaldson	4	4
(United States) Rajeev Ram	6	6
WC	(United States) Mitchell Krueger	3	4
18	(Canada) Vasek Pospisil	6	6

Qualifying competition
(United States) Rajeev Ram	6	3	2
18	(Canada) Vasek Pospisil	4	6	6

==== Seventh qualifier ====
First round
7	(Colombia) Santiago Giraldo	6	7^{8}
WC	(United States) Michael Mmoh	3	6^{6}
(Belgium) Ruben Bemelmans	4	6	3
13	(Slovakia) Norbert Gombos	6	1	6

Qualifying competition
7	(Colombia) Santiago Giraldo	7	3	6
13	(Slovakia) Norbert Gombos	5	6	2

==== Eighth qualifier ====
First round
8	(United States) Ernesto Escobedo	3	3
(Germany) Peter Gojowczyk	6	6
(Argentina) Marco Trungelliti	6	7^{7}
15	(Slovakia) Jozef Kovalík	4	6^{4}

Qualifying competition
(Germany) Peter Gojowczyk	6	2	6
(Argentina) Marco Trungelliti	2	6	3

==== Ninth qualifier ====
First round
9	(Serbia) Dušan Lajović	5	7	6
WC	(Croatia) Ivan Dodig	7	5	0
(Germany) Benjamin Becker	5	6	4
21	(Germany) Tobias Kamke	7	3	6

Qualifying competition
9	(Serbia) Dušan Lajović	6	6
21	(Germany) Tobias Kamke	4	3

==== Tenth qualifier ====
First round
10	(Ukraine) Illya Marchenko	6	2	6
(Russia) Teymuraz Gabashvili	4	6	4
(Australia) Sam Groth	4	6^{5}
14	(France) Julien Benneteau	6	7^{7}

Qualifying competition
10	(Ukraine) Illya Marchenko	4	4
14	(France) Julien Benneteau	6	6

==== Eleventh qualifier ====
First round
11	(Ukraine) Sergiy Stakhovsky	6^{3}	3
(Italy) Federico Gaio	7^{7}	6
(Australia) Andrew Whittington	6	6
22	(Russia) Andrey Rublev	3	1

Qualifying competition
(Italy) Federico Gaio	6	7
(Australia) Andrew Whittington	2	5

==== Twelfth qualifier ====
First round
12	(Romania) Marius Copil	7^{7}	6
(Czech Republic) Lukáš Rosol	6^{5}	2
(Hungary) Márton Fucsovics	3	3
19	(United States) Denis Kudla	6	6

Qualifying competition
12	(Romania) Marius Copil	7^{7}	6
19	(United States) Denis Kudla	6^{4}	3
