= 2016 BNP Paribas Open – Women's singles =

Women's singles
- 2016 BNP Paribas Open

Final
- Champion: (Belarus) Victoria Azarenka
- Runner-up: (United States) Serena Williams
- Score: 6–4, 6–4

Details
- Draw: 96
- Seeds: 32

Events
Singles	men	women
Doubles	men	women
- Indian Wells Open

Victoria Azarenka defeated Serena Williams in the final, 6–4, 6–4 to win the women's singles tennis title at the 2016 Indian Wells Masters. It was her second Indian Wells title and 19th WTA Tour singles title in total.

Simona Halep was the defending champion, but lost in the quarterfinals to Serena Williams.

This edition of the tournament marked Venus Williams' return to the tournament for the first time since 2001; she had boycotted the event in protest of racist remarks surrounding her withdrawal from the 2001 semifinal against Serena. She lost to Kurumi Nara in the second round.

== Seeds ==
All seeds received a bye into the second round.

1. (United States) Serena Williams (final)
2. (Germany) Angelique Kerber (second round)
3. (Poland) Agnieszka Radwańska (semifinals)
4. (Spain) Garbiñe Muguruza (second round)
5. (Romania) Simona Halep (quarterfinals)
6. (Spain) Carla Suárez Navarro (withdrew because of a right ankle injury)
7. (Switzerland) Belinda Bencic (third round)
8. (Czech Republic) Petra Kvitová (quarterfinals)
9. (Italy) Roberta Vinci (fourth round, retired due to a left ankle injury)
10. (United States) Venus Williams (second round)
11. (Czech Republic) Lucie Šafářová (second round)
12. (Switzerland) Timea Bacsinszky (fourth round)
13. (Belarus) Victoria Azarenka (champion)
14. (Serbia) Ana Ivanovic (third round)
15. (Italy) Sara Errani (second round)
16. (Russia) Svetlana Kuznetsova (second round)

17. (Ukraine) Elina Svitolina (third round)
18. (Czech Republic) Karolína Plíšková (semifinals)
19. (Serbia) Jelena Janković (fourth round)
20. (Denmark) Caroline Wozniacki (second round)
21. (United States) Sloane Stephens (second round)
22. (Germany) Andrea Petkovic (second round)
23. (United States) Madison Keys (second round)
24. (Russia) Anastasia Pavlyuchenkova (second round)
25. (United Kingdom) Johanna Konta (fourth round)
26. (Australia) Samantha Stosur (fourth round)
27. (France) Kristina Mladenovic (second round)
28. (Slovakia) Anna Karolína Schmiedlová (second round)
29. (Germany) Sabine Lisicki (second round)
30. (Russia) Ekaterina Makarova (third round)
31. (Australia) Daria Gavrilova (second round)
32. (Romania) Monica Niculescu (third round)

Click on the seed number of a player to go to their draw section.

== Draw ==
Key

- Q = Qualifier
- WC = Wild card
- LL = Lucky loser
- Alt = Alternate
- ITF = ITF entry
- PR = Protected ranking
- SR = Special ranking
- SE = Special exempt
- JE = Junior exempt
- JR = Junior Accelerator Programme entrant
- CO = College Accelerator Programme entrant
- NG = Next Gen Accelerator Program entrant
- w/o = Walkover
- r = Retired
- d = Defaulted

=== Finals ===
Quarterfinals
1	(United States) Serena Williams	6	6
5	(Romania) Simona Halep	4	3
3	(Poland) Agnieszka Radwańska	6	7^{7}
8	(Czech Republic) Petra Kvitová	2	6^{3}
(Slovakia) Magdaléna Rybáriková	0	0
13	(Belarus) Victoria Azarenka	6	6
(Russia) Daria Kasatkina	3	2
18	(Czech Republic) Karolína Plíšková	6	6

Semifinals
1	(United States) Serena Williams	6	7^{7}
3	(Poland) Agnieszka Radwańska	4	6^{1}
13	(Belarus) Victoria Azarenka	7^{7}	1	6
18	(Czech Republic) Karolína Plíšková	6^{1}	6	2

Final
1	(United States) Serena Williams	4	4
13	(Belarus) Victoria Azarenka	6	6

=== Top half ===
==== Section 1 ====
First round
Q	(Germany) L Siegemund	3	6	6
(Romania) I-C Begu	6	4	4
(Kazakhstan) Y Putintseva	6	6
PR	(China) S Peng	0	1
(Belgium) A Van Uytvanck	2	7^{7}	2
Q	(Ukraine) K Bondarenko	6	6^{2}	6
(Ukraine) L Tsurenko	7	6
(Hungary) T Babos	5	4

Second round
1	(United States) S Williams	6	6
Q	(Germany) L Siegemund	2	1
(Kazakhstan) Y Putintseva	6	6
27	(France) K Mladenovic	4	4
24	(Russia) A Pavlyuchenkova	2	7^{7}	4
Q	(Ukraine) K Bondarenko	6	6^{1}	6
(Ukraine) L Tsurenko	6	6
15	(Italy) S Errani	4	3

Third round
1	(United States) S Williams	7^{7}	6
(Kazakhstan) Y Putintseva	6^{2}	0
Q	(Ukraine) K Bondarenko	3	6	7^{9}
(Ukraine) L Tsurenko	6	4	6^{7}

Fourth round
1	(United States) S Williams	6	6
Q	(Ukraine) K Bondarenko	2	2

==== Section 2 ====
First round
(Brazil) T Pereira	1	2
Q	(Japan) K Nara	6	6
(Czech Republic) B Strýcová	6	6
Q	(Belarus) A Sasnovich	1	3
(Czech Republic) L Hradecká	7^{7}	6
WC	(United States) A Riske	6^{4}	2
Q	(United States) T Townsend	2	3
PR	(United States) V King	6	6

Second round
10	(United States) V Williams	4	3
Q	(Japan) K Nara	6	6
(Czech Republic) B Strýcová	5	6	7
22	(Germany) A Petkovic	7	4	5
30	(Russia) E Makarova	6	6
(Czech Republic) L Hradecká	4	4
PR	(United States) V King	1	1
5	(Romania) S Halep	6	6

Third round
Q	(Japan) K Nara	6	1	2
(Czech Republic) B Strýcová	3	6	6
30	(Russia) E Makarova	2	4
5	(Romania) S Halep	6	6

Fourth round
(Czech Republic) B Strýcová	3	0^{r}
5	(Romania) S Halep	6	1

==== Section 3 ====
First round
(Slovakia) D Cibulková	6	6
Q	(Czech Republic) K Siniaková	2	0
PR	(Kazakhstan) G Voskoboeva	6^{4}	6	1
WC	(United Kingdom) H Watson	7^{7}	4	6
(Germany) C Witthöft	0	6	6
(United States) I Falconi	6	4	4
(United States) C Vandeweghe	6	6
Q	(Netherlands) K Bertens	4	4

Second round
3	(Poland) A Radwańska	6	3	7
(Slovakia) D Cibulková	3	6	5
WC	(United Kingdom) H Watson	4	6	2
32	(Romania) M Niculescu	6	2	6
19	(Serbia) J Janković	6	6
(Germany) C Witthöft	1	3
(United States) C Vandeweghe	6	6
16	(Russia) S Kuznetsova	4	3

Third round
3	(Poland) A Radwańska	6	6
32	(Romania) M Niculescu	2	1
19	(Serbia) J Janković	6	6
(United States) C Vandeweghe	0	1

Fourth round
3	(Poland) A Radwańska	6	6
19	(Serbia) J Janković	3	3

==== Section 4 ====
First round
Q	(Czech Republic) Kr Plíšková	3	7^{7}	5
(Kazakhstan) Y Shvedova	6	6^{3}	7
Q	(United States) N Gibbs	6	6
(Romania) A Dulgheru	1	0
(Germany) T Maria	4	6^{3}
(Sweden) J Larsson	6	7^{7}
WC	(United States) S Crawford	3	4
(Montenegro) D Kovinić	6	6

Second round
11	(Czech Republic) L Šafářová	3	4
(Kazakhstan) Y Shvedova	6	6
Q	(United States) N Gibbs	6	6
23	(United States) M Keys	3	3
29	(Germany) S Lisicki	7	4	2
(Sweden) J Larsson	5	6	6
(Montenegro) D Kovinić	3	6	6^{5}
8	(Czech Republic) P Kvitová	6	4	7^{7}

Third round
(Kazakhstan) Y Shvedova	0	4
Q	(United States) N Gibbs	6	6
(Sweden) J Larsson	3	6	5
8	(Czech Republic) P Kvitová	6	4	7

Fourth round
Q	(United States) N Gibbs	6	3	4
8	(Czech Republic) P Kvitová	4	6	6

=== Bottom half ===
==== Section 5 ====
First round
(Japan) N Hibino	2	4
WC	(United States) L Davis	6	6
PR	(United Kingdom) L Robson	6^{3}	2
(Slovakia) M Rybáriková	7^{7}	6
(United States) B Mattek-Sands	2	2
(Germany) A Beck	6	6
(Belarus) O Govortsova	1	3
(Russia) M Gasparyan	6	6

Second round
7	(Switzerland) B Bencic	6	3	6
WC	(United States) L Davis	3	6	3
(Slovakia) M Rybáriková	2	7	6
31	(Australia) D Gavrilova	6	5	4
17	(Ukraine) E Svitolina	4	7^{7}	6
(Germany) A Beck	6	6^{0}	1
(Russia) M Gasparyan	3	7^{9}	6^{5}
9	(Italy) R Vinci	6	6^{7}	7^{7}

Third round
7	(Switzerland) B Bencic	4	6	3
(Slovakia) M Rybáriková	6	3	6
17	(Ukraine) E Svitolina	1	3
9	(Italy) R Vinci	6	6

Fourth round
(Slovakia) M Rybáriková	6	2
9	(Italy) R Vinci	2	0^{r}

==== Section 6 ====
First round
(Kazakhstan) Z Diyas	6	6
WC	(United States) J Loeb	1	4
WC	(China) S Zhang	7^{7}	0
Q	(France) P Parmentier	6^{5}	0^{r}
(Slovenia) P Hercog	6	4	4
(Belgium) Y Wickmayer	0	6	6
(France) C Garcia	4	4
(United States) C McHale	6	6

Second round
13	(Belarus) V Azarenka	6	6
(Kazakhstan) Z Diyas	3	2
WC	(China) S Zhang	4	7^{10}	7
20	(Denmark) C Wozniacki	6	6^{8}	5
26	(Australia) S Stosur	2	6	7^{8}
(Belgium) Y Wickmayer	6	4	6^{6}
(United States) C McHale	7	6
4	(Spain) G Muguruza	5	1

Third round
13	(Belarus) V Azarenka	6	6
WC	(China) S Zhang	4	3
26	(Australia) S Stosur	6	2	6
(United States) C McHale	4	6	4

Fourth round
13	(Belarus) V Azarenka	6	4	6
26	(Australia) S Stosur	1	6	1

==== Section 7 ====
First round
(Russia) D Kasatkina	6	6
WC	(Slovakia) D Hantuchová	2	4
(Puerto Rico) M Puig	6	6
(Croatia) M Lučić-Baroni	1	2
(Canada) E Bouchard	2	6	6
Q	(Japan) R Ozaki	6	4	2
Q	(Croatia) D Vekić	2	5
(Bulgaria) T Pironkova	6	7

Second round
LL	(Germany) A-L Friedsam	5	3
(Russia) D Kasatkina	7	6
(Puerto Rico) M Puig	6	6
28	(Slovakia) AK Schmiedlová	1	2
21	(United States) S Stephens	5	5
(Canada) E Bouchard	7	7
(Bulgaria) T Pironkova	2	1
12	(Switzerland) T Bacsinszky	6	6

Third round
(Russia) D Kasatkina	6	3	7^{7}
(Puerto Rico) M Puig	4	6	6^{2}
(Canada) E Bouchard	2	7	2
12	(Switzerland) T Bacsinszky	6	5	6

Fourth round
(Russia) D Kasatkina	6	6
12	(Switzerland) T Bacsinszky	4	2

==== Section 8 ====
First round
(Germany) J Görges	3	2
(Italy) C Giorgi	6	6
WC	(United States) S Rogers	6	4	6
(Colombia) M Duque Mariño	1	6	3
(Japan) M Doi	1	5
(United States) M Brengle	6	7
(Czech Republic) D Allertová	6	6
PR	(Czech Republic) P Cetkovská	0	1

Second round
14	(Serbia) A Ivanovic	2	6	7^{7}
(Italy) C Giorgi	6	2	6^{5}
WC	(United States) S Rogers	2	4
18	(Czech Republic) Ka Plíšková	6	6
25	(United Kingdom) J Konta	6	6
(United States) M Brengle	4	0
(Czech Republic) D Allertová	7	7
2	(Germany) A Kerber	5	5

Third round
14	(Serbia) A Ivanovic	2	0
18	(Czech Republic) Ka Plíšková	6	6
25	(United Kingdom) J Konta	6	6
(Czech Republic) D Allertová	4	1

Fourth round
18	(Czech Republic) Ka Plíšková	7^{7}	3	6
25	(United Kingdom) J Konta	6^{2}	6	3

== Qualifying ==
=== Seeds ===
1. (Germany) Anna-Lena Friedsam (qualifying competition, lucky loser)
2. (China) Zheng Saisai (qualifying competition)
3. (Ukraine) Kateryna Bondarenko (qualified)
4. (Chinese Taipei) Hsieh Su-wei (first round)
5. (Belgium) Kirsten Flipkens (qualifying competition)
6. (Croatia) Ana Konjuh (first round)
7. (Germany) Laura Siegemund (qualified)
8. (Japan) Kurumi Nara (qualified)
9. (Russia) Elena Vesnina (first round)
10. (Estonia) Anett Kontaveit (qualifying competition)
11. (Latvia) Anastasija Sevastova (qualifying competition)
12. (Croatia) Donna Vekić (qualified)
13. (Belarus) Aliaksandra Sasnovich (qualified)
14. (Czech Republic) Kristýna Plíšková (qualified)
15. (Russia) Evgeniya Rodina (first round)
16. (United States) Nicole Gibbs (qualified)
17. (Japan) Naomi Osaka (qualifying competition)
18. (Poland) Magda Linette (first round)
19. (Spain) Lourdes Domínguez Lino (qualifying competition)
20. (Netherlands) Kiki Bertens (qualified)
21. (Czech Republic) Kateřina Siniaková (qualified)
22. (Czech Republic) Klára Koukalová (first round)
23. (United States) Anna Tatishvili (first round)
24. (France) Pauline Parmentier (qualified)

=== Qualifiers ===
1. (United States) Nicole Gibbs
2. (France) Pauline Parmentier
3. (Ukraine) Kateryna Bondarenko
4. (Czech Republic) Kristýna Plíšková
5. (Belarus) Aliaksandra Sasnovich
6. (Netherlands) Kiki Bertens
7. (Germany) Laura Siegemund
8. (Japan) Kurumi Nara
9. (Czech Republic) Kateřina Siniaková
10. (Japan) Risa Ozaki
11. (United States) Taylor Townsend
12. (Croatia) Donna Vekić

=== Lucky losers ===
1. (Germany) Anna-Lena Friedsam

=== Qualifying draw ===
==== First qualifier ====
First round
1	(Germany) Anna-Lena Friedsam	4	6	6
(Israel) Julia Glushko	6	0	4
(Switzerland) Viktorija Golubic	5	5
16	(United States) Nicole Gibbs	7	7

Qualifying competition
1	(Germany) Anna-Lena Friedsam	4	7	5
16	(United States) Nicole Gibbs	6	5	7

==== Second qualifier ====
First round
2	(China) Zheng Saisai	7	6
WC	(United States) Sofia Kenin	5	2
(Ukraine) Kateryna Kozlova	6	6^{3}	1
24	(France) Pauline Parmentier	1	7^{7}	6

Qualifying competition
2	(China) Zheng Saisai	2	6^{2}
24	(France) Pauline Parmentier	6	7^{7}

==== Third qualifier ====
First round
3	(Ukraine) Kateryna Bondarenko	6	6
(Poland) Paula Kania	0	4
WC	(United States) Maria Sanchez	6^{3}	6	2
19	(Spain) Lourdes Domínguez Lino	7^{7}	3	6

Qualifying competition
3	(Ukraine) Kateryna Bondarenko	6	6
19	(Spain) Lourdes Domínguez Lino	4	0

==== Fourth qualifier ====
First round
4	(Chinese Taipei) Hsieh Su-wei	5	1
(China) Han Xinyun	7	6
WC	(United States) Sachia Vickery	0	6	3
14	(Czech Republic) Kristýna Plíšková	6	4	6

Qualifying competition
(China) Han Xinyun	1	2
14	(Czech Republic) Kristýna Plíšková	6	6

==== Fifth qualifier ====
First round
5	(Belgium) Kirsten Flipkens	7	6
(United States) Louisa Chirico	5	3
(Bulgaria) Sesil Karatantcheva	5	4
13	(Belarus) Aliaksandra Sasnovich	7	6

Qualifying competition
5	(Belgium) Kirsten Flipkens	1	2
13	(Belarus) Aliaksandra Sasnovich	6	6

==== Sixth qualifier ====
First round
6	(Croatia) Ana Konjuh	1	3
(Canada) Aleksandra Wozniak	6	6
(China) Duan Yingying	6	3	0
20	(Netherlands) Kiki Bertens	3	6	6

Qualifying competition
(Canada) Aleksandra Wozniak	4	2
20	(Netherlands) Kiki Bertens	6	6

==== Seventh qualifier ====
First round
7	(Germany) Laura Siegemund	6	6
(Australia) Jarmila Wolfe	2	2
(Austria) Tamira Paszek	7	4	4
17	(Japan) Naomi Osaka	5	6	6

Qualifying competition
7	(Germany) Laura Siegemund	6	6
17	(Japan) Naomi Osaka	2	3

==== Eighth qualifier ====
First round
8	(Japan) Kurumi Nara	6	6
(Romania) Patricia Maria Țig	2	1
(Paraguay) Verónica Cepede Royg	6	6
22	(Czech Republic) Klára Koukalová	1	4

Qualifying competition
8	(Japan) Kurumi Nara	6	6
(Paraguay) Verónica Cepede Royg	4	1

==== Ninth qualifier ====
First round
9	(Russia) Elena Vesnina	4	3
WC	(United States) Julia Boserup	6	6
WC	(United States) Raveena Kingsley	3	1
21	(Czech Republic) Kateřina Siniaková	6	6

Qualifying competition
WC	(United States) Julia Boserup	0	2
21	(Czech Republic) Kateřina Siniaková	6	6

==== Tenth qualifier ====
First round
10	(Estonia) Anett Kontaveit	6	6
(Greece) Maria Sakkari	4	3
(Japan) Risa Ozaki	2	7^{7}	6
18	(Poland) Magda Linette	6	6^{3}	4

Qualifying competition
10	(Estonia) Anett Kontaveit	6^{5}	4
(Japan) Risa Ozaki	7^{7}	6

==== Eleventh qualifier ====
First round
11	(Latvia) Anastasija Sevastova	6	6
(United States) Jessica Pegula	2	2
WC	(United States) Taylor Townsend	6	7^{7}
15	(Russia) Evgeniya Rodina	2	6^{1}

Qualifying competition
11	(Latvia) Anastasija Sevastova	2	7	2
WC	(United States) Taylor Townsend	6	5	6

==== Twelfth qualifier ====
First round
12	(Croatia) Donna Vekić	6	4	6
(Belgium) An-Sophie Mestach	3	6	1
(Slovakia) Jana Čepelová	2	7	6
23	(United States) Anna Tatishvili	6	5	1

Qualifying competition
12	(Croatia) Donna Vekić	6	2	6
(Slovakia) Jana Čepelová	3	6	2
