= 2015 Western & Southern Open =

- Date: August 15–23
- Edition: 114th (men) / 87th (women)
- Category: ATP World Tour Masters 1000 (men); WTA Premier 5 (women)
- Surface: Hard / outdoor
- Location: Mason, Ohio, United States
- Venue: Lindner Family Tennis Center

Champions

Men's singles
- (Switzerland) Roger Federer

Women's singles
- (United States) Serena Williams

Men's doubles
- (Canada) Daniel Nestor / (France) Édouard Roger-Vasselin

Women's doubles
- (Chinese Taipei) Chan Hao-ching / (Chinese Taipei) Chan Yung-jan
- Cincinnati Masters

The 2015 Western & Southern Open was a men's and women's tennis tournament played on outdoor hard courts August 15–23, 2015. It was part of the ATP World Tour Masters 1000 of the 2015 ATP World Tour and of the WTA Premier 5 tournaments of the 2015 WTA Tour, as well as a 2015 US Open Series event. The 2015 tournament was the men's 114th edition and the women's 87th edition of the Cincinnati Masters. The tournament is held annually at the Lindner Family Tennis Center in Mason, Ohio (a northern suburb of Cincinnati), United States.

Roger Federer and Serena Williams were the defending champions and both successfully defended their titles.

== Finals ==
=== Men's singles ===
- (Switzerland) Roger Federer defeated (Serbia) Novak Djokovic, 7–6^{(7–1)}, 6–3

=== Women's singles ===
- (United States) Serena Williams defeated (Romania) Simona Halep 6–3, 7–6^{(7–5)}

=== Men's doubles ===
- (Canada) Daniel Nestor / (France) Édouard Roger-Vasselin defeated (Poland) Marcin Matkowski / (Serbia) Nenad Zimonjić, 6–2, 6–2

=== Women's doubles ===
- (Chinese Taipei) Chan Hao-ching / (Chinese Taipei) Chan Yung-jan defeated (Australia) Casey Dellacqua / (Kazakhstan) Yaroslava Shvedova, 7–5, 6–4

== Points and prize money ==
=== Point distribution ===
Event	W	F	SF	QF	Round of 16	Round of 32	Round of 64	Q	Q2	Q1
Men's singles	1000	600	360	180	90	45	10	25	16	0
Men's doubles	1000	600	360	180	90	0	—N/a	—N/a	—N/a	—N/a
Women's singles	900	585	350	190	105	60	1	30	20	1
Women's doubles	900	585	350	190	105	5	—N/a	—N/a	—N/a	—N/a

=== Prize money ===
Event	W	F	SF	QF	Round of 16	Round of 32	Round of 64	Q2	Q1
Men's singles	$731,000	$358,375	$180,370	$91,715	$47,625	$25,110	$13,555	$3,125	$1,590
Women's singles	$495,000	$240,500	$120,500	$57,380	$27,640	$14,160	$7,640	$3,105	$1,880
Men's doubles	$226,350	$110,820	$55,580	$28,530	$14,750	$7,780	—N/a	—N/a	—N/a
Women's doubles	$141,600	$71,530	$35,410	$17,825	$9,035	$4,460	—N/a	—N/a	—N/a

== ATP singles main-draw entrants ==
=== Seeds ===
Country	Player	Ranking	Seed
SRB	Novak Djokovic	1	1
SUI	Roger Federer	3	2
GBR	Andy Murray	2	3
~~JPN~~	~~Kei Nishikori~~	~~4~~	~~4~~
SUI	Stan Wawrinka	5	5
CZE	Tomáš Berdych	6	6
CRO	Marin Čilić	8	7
ESP	Rafael Nadal	9	8
CAN	Milos Raonic	10	9
FRA	Gilles Simon	11	10
USA	John Isner	12	11
FRA	Richard Gasquet	13	12
BEL	David Goffin	14	13
FRA	Gaël Monfils	15	14
RSA	Kevin Anderson	16	15
BUL	Grigor Dimitrov	17	16

- Rankings are as of August 10, 2015

=== Other entrants ===
The following players received wild cards into the main singles draw:

- (United States) Jared Donaldson
- (United States) Mardy Fish
- (United States) Bjorn Fratangelo
- (United States) Rajeev Ram

The following players received entry from the singles qualifying draw:

- (Ukraine) Alexandr Dolgopolov
- (Australia) Thanasi Kokkinakis
- (United States) Denis Kudla
- (Chinese Taipei) Lu Yen-hsun
- (France) Nicolas Mahut
- (Canada) Vasek Pospisil
- (Germany) Alexander Zverev

The following player received entry as a lucky loser:

- (France) Benoît Paire

=== Withdrawals ===
Before the tournament

- (Spain) David Ferrer → replaced by (Portugal) João Sousa
- (Spain) Guillermo García López → replaced by (Luxembourg) Gilles Müller
- (Germany) Tommy Haas → replaced by (Poland) Jerzy Janowicz
- (Argentina) Juan Mónaco → replaced by (Czech Republic) Jiří Veselý
- (Japan) Kei Nishikori → replaced by (France) Benoît Paire

== ATP doubles main-draw entrants ==
=== Seeds ===
Country	Player	Country	Player	Rank^{1}	Seed
USA	Bob Bryan	USA	Mike Bryan	2	1
CRO	Ivan Dodig	BRA	Marcelo Melo	7	2
NED	Jean-Julien Rojer	ROU	Horia Tecău	11	3
ITA	Simone Bolelli	ITA	Fabio Fognini	16	4
IND	Rohan Bopanna	ROU	Florin Mergea	18	5
POL	Marcin Matkowski	SRB	Nenad Zimonjić	23	6
GBR	Jamie Murray	AUS	John Peers	31	7
CAN	Vasek Pospisil	USA	Jack Sock	32	8

- Rankings are as of August 10, 2015

=== Other entrants ===
The following pairs received wildcards into the doubles main draw:

- (United States) Eric Butorac / (United States) Scott Lipsky
- (United States) Steve Johnson / (United States) Sam Querrey

== WTA singles main-draw entrants ==
=== Seeds ===
Country	Player	Ranking	Seeds
USA	Serena Williams	1	1
~~RUS~~	~~Maria Sharapova~~	~~2~~	~~2~~
ROU	Simona Halep	3	3
CZE	Petra Kvitová	4	4
DEN	Caroline Wozniacki	5	5
SRB	Ana Ivanovic	6	6
CZE	Lucie Šafářová	7	7
CZE	Karolína Plíšková	8	8
ESP	Garbiñe Muguruza	9	9
ESP	Carla Suárez Navarro	10	10
GER	Angelique Kerber	11	11
SUI	Timea Bacsinszky	13	12
POL	Agnieszka Radwańska	14	13
UKR	Elina Svitolina	15	14
GER	Andrea Petkovic	16	15
ITA	Sara Errani	17	16

- Rankings are as of August 10, 2015

=== Other entrants ===
The following players received wild cards into the main singles draw:

- (Slovakia) Daniela Hantuchová
- (United States) Alison Riske
- ~~(Russia) Maria Sharapova~~
- (United States) CoCo Vandeweghe

The following player received entry using a protected ranking into the main singles draw:

- (Slovakia) Dominika Cibulková

The following players received entry from the singles qualifying draw:

- (Hungary) Tímea Babos
- (Germany) Mona Barthel
- (Ukraine) Kateryna Bondarenko
- (United States) Lauren Davis
- (Australia) Casey Dellacqua
- (Germany) Julia Görges
- (Czech Republic) Lucie Hradecká
- (Croatia) Ana Konjuh
- (United States) Christina McHale
- (Kazakhstan) Yulia Putintseva
- (Slovakia) Anna Karolína Schmiedlová
- (Kazakhstan) Yaroslava Shvedova

The following player received entry as a lucky loser:

- (Croatia) Mirjana Lučić-Baroni

=== Withdrawals ===
Before the tournament

- (Russia) Svetlana Kuznetsova (left lower leg injury) → replaced by (Bulgaria) Tsvetana Pironkova
- (Russia) Ekaterina Makarova (right lower leg injury) → replaced by (United States) Varvara Lepchenko
- (Russia) Maria Sharapova (right upper leg injury) → replaced by (Croatia) Mirjana Lučić-Baroni

During the tournament

- (United States) Venus Williams (viral illness)

=== Retirements ===
- (Belarus) Victoria Azarenka (left thigh injury)
- (Switzerland) Belinda Bencic (right wrist injury)

== WTA doubles main-draw entrants ==
=== Seeds ===
Country	Player	Country	Player	Rank^{1}	Seed
SUI	Martina Hingis	IND	Sania Mirza	3	1
HUN	Tímea Babos	FRA	Kristina Mladenovic	19	2
SLO	Katarina Srebotnik	FRA	Caroline Garcia	31	3
AUS	Casey Dellacqua	KAZ	Yaroslava Shvedova	31	4
USA	Raquel Kops-Jones	AUS	Anastasia Rodionova	32	5
RUS	Anastasia Pavlyuchenkova	CZE	Lucie Šafářová	34	6
CZE	Andrea Hlaváčková	CZE	Lucie Hradecká	36	7
ESP	Garbiñe Muguruza	ESP	Carla Suárez Navarro	38	8

- Rankings are as of August 10, 2015

=== Other entrants ===
The following pairs received wildcards into the doubles main draw:

- (United States) Madison Brengle / (United States) Alexa Glatch
- (United States) Madison Keys / (United States) Lisa Raymond
- (United States) Christina McHale / (United States) CoCo Vandeweghe
