= 2015 Western & Southern Open – Men's doubles =

Men's doubles
- 2015 Western & Southern Open

Final
- Champions: (Canada) Daniel Nestor (France) Édouard Roger-Vasselin
- Runners-up: (Poland) Marcin Matkowski (Serbia) Nenad Zimonjić
- Score: 6–2, 6–2

Events
Singles	men	women
Doubles	men	women
← 2014 ·	Western & Southern Open	· 2016 →

Bob and Mike Bryan were the two-time defending champions but lost in the quarterfinals to Daniel Nestor and Édouard Roger-Vasselin.
Nestor and Roger-Vasselin went on to win the title, defeating Marcin Matkowski and Nenad Zimonjić in the final, 6–2, 6–2.

== Seeds ==
All seeds receive a bye into the second round.

1. (United States) Bob Bryan / (United States) Mike Bryan (quarterfinals)
2. (Croatia) Ivan Dodig / (Brazil) Marcelo Melo (semifinals)
3. (Netherlands) Jean-Julien Rojer / (Romania) Horia Tecău (quarterfinals)
4. (Italy) Simone Bolelli / (Italy) Fabio Fognini (second round)
5. (India) Rohan Bopanna / (Romania) Florin Mergea (quarterfinals)
6. (Poland) Marcin Matkowski / (Serbia) Nenad Zimonjić (final)
7. (United Kingdom) Jamie Murray / (Australia) John Peers (second round)
8. (Canada) Vasek Pospisil / (United States) Jack Sock (second round)

== Draw ==
=== Key ===
- Q = Qualifier
- WC = Wild card
- LL = Lucky loser
- Alt = Alternate
- SE = Special exempt
- PR = Protected ranking
- ITF = ITF entry
- JE = Junior exempt
- w/o = Walkover
- r = Retired
- d = Defaulted
- SR = Special ranking

=== Finals ===
Semifinals
(Canada) Daniel Nestor (France) Édouard Roger-Vasselin	7	6
(Spain) Feliciano López (Belarus) Max Mirnyi	5	4
6	(Poland) Marcin Matkowski (Serbia) Nenad Zimonjić	6	6
2	(Croatia) Ivan Dodig (Brazil) Marcelo Melo	4	4

Final
(Canada) Daniel Nestor (France) Édouard Roger-Vasselin	6	6
6	(Poland) Marcin Matkowski (Serbia) Nenad Zimonjić	2	2

=== Top half ===
First round
(France) G Monfils (France) J-W Tsonga	3	2
(Colombia) JS Cabal (Colombia) R Farah	6	6
(Canada) D Nestor (France) É Roger-Vasselin	3	7	[11]
WC	(United States) E Butorac (United States) S Lipsky	6	5	[9]
(Uruguay) P Cuevas (Spain) D Marrero	6^{2}	6	[6]
(Spain) F López (Belarus) M Mirnyi	7^{7}	3	[10]
(South Africa) K Anderson (France) J Chardy	6	1	[6]
(India) L Paes (Switzerland) S Wawrinka	1	6	[10]

Second round
1	(United States) B Bryan (United States) M Bryan	7^{11}	6
(Colombia) JS Cabal (Colombia) R Farah	6^{9}	4
(Canada) D Nestor (France) É Roger-Vasselin	7^{7}	7^{7}
7	(United Kingdom) J Murray (Australia) J Peers	6^{3}	6^{5}
4	(Italy) S Bolelli (Italy) F Fognini	3	3
(Spain) F López (Belarus) M Mirnyi	6	6
(India) L Paes (Switzerland) S Wawrinka	7^{7}	3	[10]
8	(Canada) V Pospisil (United States) J Sock	6^{4}	6	[3]

Quarterfinals
1	(United States) B Bryan (United States) M Bryan	4	4
(Canada) D Nestor (France) É Roger-Vasselin	6	6
(Spain) F López (Belarus) M Mirnyi	3	6	[14]
(India) L Paes (Switzerland) S Wawrinka	6	2	[12]

Semifinals
(Canada) D Nestor (France) É Roger-Vasselin	7	6
(Spain) F López (Belarus) M Mirnyi	5	4

=== Bottom half ===
First round
PR	(Czech Republic) T Berdych (United States) M Fish	6^{5}	4
(South Africa) R Klaasen (United States) R Ram	7^{7}	6
(Austria) A Peya (Brazil) B Soares	6^{5}	7	[10]
(Belgium) D Goffin (Austria) D Thiem	7^{7}	5	[6]
(France) P-H Herbert (France) N Mahut	6	6
(France) A Mannarino (France) G Simon	3	2
WC	(United States) S Johnson (United States) S Querrey	6	6
(Italy) A Seppi (Serbia) V Troicki	3	4

Second round
6	(Poland) M Matkowski (Serbia) N Zimonjić	7^{7}	6
(South Africa) R Klaasen (United States) R Ram	6^{4}	4
(Austria) A Peya (Brazil) B Soares	4	6	[9]
3	(Netherlands) J-J Rojer (Romania) H Tecău	6	3	[11]
5	(India) R Bopanna (Romania) F Mergea	1	7^{7}	[13]
(France) P-H Herbert (France) N Mahut	6	6^{5}	[11]
WC	(United States) S Johnson (United States) S Querrey	6^{4}	6^{4}
2	(Croatia) I Dodig (Brazil) M Melo	7^{7}	7^{7}

Quarterfinals
6	(Poland) M Matkowski (Serbia) N Zimonjić	6	6
3	(Netherlands) J-J Rojer (Romania) H Tecău	3	4
5	(India) R Bopanna (Romania) F Mergea	1	6	[12]
2	(Croatia) I Dodig (Brazil) M Melo	6	1	[14]

Semifinals
6	(Poland) M Matkowski (Serbia) N Zimonjić	6	6
2	(Croatia) I Dodig (Brazil) M Melo	4	4
