= 2015 Western & Southern Open – Women's doubles =

Women's doubles
- 2015 Western & Southern Open

Final
- Champions: (Chinese Taipei) Chan Hao-ching (Chinese Taipei) Chan Yung-jan
- Runners-up: (Australia) Casey Dellacqua (Kazakhstan) Yaroslava Shvedova
- Score: 7–5, 6–4

Details
- Seeds: 8

Events
Singles	men	women
Doubles	men	women
← 2014 ·	Western & Southern Open	· 2016 →

Raquel Kops-Jones and Abigail Spears were the defending champions, but Spears chose not to participate this year. Kops-Jones played alongside Anastasia Rodionova, but lost in the second round to Chuang Chia-jung and Hsieh Su-wei.
Chan Hao-ching and Chan Yung-jan won the title, defeating Casey Dellacqua and Yaroslava Shvedova in the final, 7–5, 6–4.

== Seeds ==
The top four seeds received a bye into the second round.

1. (Switzerland) Martina Hingis / (India) Sania Mirza (semifinals)
2. (Hungary) Tímea Babos / (France) Kristina Mladenovic (quarterfinals)
3. (France) Caroline Garcia / (Slovenia) Katarina Srebotnik (second round)
4. (Australia) Casey Dellacqua / (Kazakhstan) Yaroslava Shvedova (final)
5. (United States) Raquel Kops-Jones / (Australia) Anastasia Rodionova (second round)
6. (Russia) Anastasia Pavlyuchenkova / (Czech Republic) Lucie Šafářová (second round)
7. (Czech Republic) Andrea Hlaváčková / (Czech Republic) Lucie Hradecká (first round)
8. (Spain) Garbiñe Muguruza / (Spain) Carla Suárez Navarro (first round)

== Draw ==
=== Key ===
- Q = Qualifier
- WC = Wild card
- LL = Lucky loser
- Alt = Alternate
- SE = Special exempt
- PR = Protected ranking
- ITF = ITF entry
- JE = Junior exempt
- w/o = Walkover
- r = Retired
- d = Defaulted
- SR = Special ranking

=== Finals ===
Semifinals
1	(Switzerland) Martina Hingis (India) Sania Mirza	4	6	[6]
(Chinese Taipei) Chan Hao-ching (Chinese Taipei) Chan Yung-jan	6	0	[10]
4	(Australia) Casey Dellacqua (Kazakhstan) Yaroslava Shvedova	6	7
(Chinese Taipei) Chuang Chia-jung (Chinese Taipei) Hsieh Su-wei	2	5

Final
(Chinese Taipei) Chan Hao-ching (Chinese Taipei) Chan Yung-jan	7	6
4	(Australia) Casey Dellacqua (Kazakhstan) Yaroslava Shvedova	5	4

=== Top half ===
First round
(Germany) J Görges (Poland) K Jans-Ignacik	7	6
(Romania) I-C Begu (Poland) A Rosolska	5	4
(United States) I Falconi (Romania) M Niculescu	7	3	[1]
WC	(United States) C McHale (United States) C Vandeweghe	5	6	[10]
WC	(United States) M Keys (United States) L Raymond	7^{8}	6
7	(Czech Republic) A Hlaváčková (Czech Republic) L Hradecká	6^{6}	4
(Chinese Taipei) H-c Chan (Chinese Taipei) Y-j Chan	6	6
(Croatia) D Jurak (Germany) L Siegemund	2	4
(Italy) S Errani (Italy) F Pennetta	7^{7}	6
(Spain) L Arruabarrena (Slovenia) A Klepač	6^{3}	2
(Germany) A-L Grönefeld (Sweden) J Larsson	3	6	[10]
6	(Russia) A Pavlyuchenkova (Czech Republic) L Šafářová	6	3	[12]

Second round
1	(Switzerland) M Hingis (India) S Mirza	7^{7}	6
(Germany) J Görges (Poland) K Jans-Ignacik	6^{3}	4
WC	(United States) C McHale (United States) C Vandeweghe	7	6
WC	(United States) M Keys (United States) L Raymond	5	2
3	(France) C Garcia (Slovenia) K Srebotnik	6	2	[10]
(Chinese Taipei) H-c Chan (Chinese Taipei) Y-j Chan	3	6	[12]
(Italy) S Errani (Italy) F Pennetta	6	3	[10]
6	(Russia) A Pavlyuchenkova (Czech Republic) L Šafářová	1	6	[3]

Quarterfinals
1	(Switzerland) M Hingis (India) S Mirza	6	6
WC	(United States) C McHale (United States) C Vandeweghe	4	1
(Chinese Taipei) H-c Chan (Chinese Taipei) Y-j Chan	6^{4}	7^{7}	[19]
(Italy) S Errani (Italy) F Pennetta	7^{7}	6^{1}	[17]

Semifinals
1	(Switzerland) M Hingis (India) S Mirza	4	6	[6]
(Chinese Taipei) H-c Chan (Chinese Taipei) Y-j Chan	6	0	[10]

=== Bottom half ===
First round
8	(Spain) G Muguruza (Spain) C Suárez Navarro	4	2
(Serbia) J Janković (Russia) E Vesnina	6	6
(Spain) A Medina Garrigues (Spain) A Parra Santonja	3	6	[10]
(Switzerland) B Bencic (Czech Republic) Ka Plíšková	6	4	[5]
WC	(United States) M Brengle (United States) A Glatch	6	3	[6]
(Netherlands) M Krajicek (Czech Republic) B Strýcová	3	6	[10]
5	(United States) R Kops-Jones (Australia) An Rodionova	6	6
(Germany) T Maria (Ukraine) O Savchuk	3	0
(Australia) Ar Rodionova (United Kingdom) H Watson	2	1
(Chinese Taipei) C-j Chuang (Chinese Taipei) S-w Hsieh	6	6
(Italy) K Knapp (Italy) R Vinci	6	6
(Germany) M Barthel (Australia) J Gajdošová	4	1

Second round
(Serbia) J Janković (Russia) E Vesnina	7	6
(Spain) A Medina Garrigues (Spain) A Parra Santonja	5	4
(Netherlands) M Krajicek (Czech Republic) B Strýcová	4	5
4	(Australia) C Dellacqua (Kazakhstan) Y Shvedova	6	7
5	(United States) R Kops-Jones (Australia) An Rodionova	1	6	[7]
(Chinese Taipei) C-j Chuang (Chinese Taipei) S-w Hsieh	6	3	[10]
(Italy) K Knapp (Italy) R Vinci	6	3	[7]
2	(Hungary) T Babos (France) K Mladenovic	2	6	[10]

Quarterfinals
(Serbia) J Janković (Russia) E Vesnina	4	3
4	(Australia) C Dellacqua (Kazakhstan) Y Shvedova	6	6
(Chinese Taipei) C-j Chuang (Chinese Taipei) S-w Hsieh	4	6	[13]
2	(Hungary) T Babos (France) K Mladenovic	6	4	[11]

Semifinals
4	(Australia) C Dellacqua (Kazakhstan) Y Shvedova	6	7
(Chinese Taipei) C-j Chuang (Chinese Taipei) S-w Hsieh	2	5
