= 2014 Shanghai Rolex Masters – Singles =

Singles
- 2014 Shanghai Rolex Masters

Final
- Champion: (Switzerland) Roger Federer
- Runner-up: (France) Gilles Simon
- Score: 7–6^{(8–6)}, 7–6^{(7–2)}

Details
- Draw: 56
- Seeds: 16

Events
Singles	Doubles
← 2013 ·	Shanghai Masters	· 2015 →

Roger Federer defeated Gilles Simon in the final, 7–6^{(8–6)}, 7–6^{(7–2)} to win the singles tennis title at the 2014 Shanghai Masters. Federer saved five match points en route to his first Shanghai Masters title, against Leonardo Mayer in the second round.

Novak Djokovic was the two-time defending champion, but lost to Federer in the semifinals.

== Seeds ==
The top eight seeds receive a bye into the second round.

1. (Serbia) Novak Djokovic (semifinals)
2. (Spain) Rafael Nadal (second round)
3. (Switzerland) Roger Federer (champion)
4. (Switzerland) Stan Wawrinka (second round)
5. (Spain) David Ferrer (quarterfinals)
6. (Czech Republic) Tomáš Berdych (quarterfinals)
7. (Japan) Kei Nishikori (second round)
8. (Canada) Milos Raonic (second round, retired because of illness)

9. (Croatia) Marin Čilić (first round)
10. (Bulgaria) Grigor Dimitrov (second round)
11. (United Kingdom) Andy Murray (third round)
12. (Latvia) Ernests Gulbis (first round)
13. (United States) John Isner (third round)
14. (Spain) Roberto Bautista Agut (third round)
15. (Italy) Fabio Fognini (first round)
16. (South Africa) Kevin Anderson (second round)

Click on the seed number of a player to go to their draw section.

== Draw ==
=== Key ===
- Q = Qualifier
- WC = Wild card
- LL = Lucky loser
- Alt = Alternate
- SE = Special exempt
- PR = Protected ranking
- ITF = ITF entry
- JE = Junior exempt
- w/o = Walkover
- r = Retired
- d = Defaulted
- SR = Special ranking

=== Finals ===
Quarterfinals
1	(Serbia) Novak Djokovic	6	6
5	(Spain) David Ferrer	4	2
3	(Switzerland) Roger Federer	7^{7}	6
(France) Julien Benneteau	6^{4}	0
6	(Czech Republic) Tomáš Berdych	6^{4}	6	0
(France) Gilles Simon	7^{7}	4	6
(Russia) Mikhail Youzhny	7	4	4
(Spain) Feliciano López	5	6	6

Semifinals
1	(Serbia) Novak Djokovic	4	4
3	(Switzerland) Roger Federer	6	6
(France) Gilles Simon	6	7^{7}
(Spain) Feliciano López	2	6^{1}

Final
3	(Switzerland) Roger Federer	7^{8}	7^{7}
(France) Gilles Simon	6^{6}	6^{2}

=== Top half ===
==== Section 1 ====
First round
(Czech Republic) L Rosol	4	6^{3}
(Austria) D Thiem	6	7^{7}
(Spain) T Robredo	6	3	6^{4}
(Kazakhstan) M Kukushkin	3	6	7^{7}
Q	(United Kingdom) J Ward	6	3	2
16	(South Africa) K Anderson	3	6	6
11	(United Kingdom) A Murray	6	7
Q	(Russia) T Gabashvili	1	5
(France) É Roger-Vasselin	6	5	6^{6}
(Poland) J Janowicz	3	7	7^{8}
Q	(Australia) S Groth	6^{1}	3
SE	(Slovakia) M Kližan	7^{7}	6

Second round
1	(Serbia) N Djokovic	6	6
(Austria) D Thiem	3	4
(Kazakhstan) M Kukushkin	6	6
16	(South Africa) K Anderson	4	2
11	(United Kingdom) A Murray	7	6
(Poland) J Janowicz	5	2
SE	(Slovakia) M Kližan	6	6^{4}	4
5	(Spain) D Ferrer	4	7^{7}	6

Third round
1	(Serbia) N Djokovic	6	4	6
(Kazakhstan) M Kukushkin	3	6	4
11	(United Kingdom) A Murray	6	1	2
5	(Spain) D Ferrer	2	6	6

Quarterfinals
1	(Serbia) N Djokovic	6	6
5	(Spain) D Ferrer	4	2

==== Section 2 ====
First round
(Argentina) L Mayer	6	6
WC	(China) D Wu	4	1
(Canada) V Pospisil	6	6^{5}	6
(Colombia) S Giraldo	2	7^{7}	1
(Ukraine) A Dolgopolov	4	4
14	(Spain) R Bautista Agut	6	6
10	(Bulgaria) G Dimitrov	6	6
(Uzbekistan) D Istomin	3	3
(France) J Benneteau	5	6	6
WC	(China) Z Zhang	7	3	3
(United States) J Sock	7^{7}	6^{4}	6
Q	(Australia) B Tomic	6^{4}	7^{7}	4

Second round
3	(Switzerland) R Federer	7	3	7^{9}
(Argentina) L Mayer	5	6	6^{7}
(Canada) V Pospisil	6^{1}	6	4
14	(Spain) R Bautista Agut	7^{7}	3	6
10	(Bulgaria) G Dimitrov	5	3
(France) J Benneteau	7	6
(United States) J Sock	7^{7}	6
7	(Japan) K Nishikori	6^{5}	4

Third round
3	(Switzerland) R Federer	6	6
14	(Spain) R Bautista Agut	4	2
(France) J Benneteau	6	6
(United States) J Sock	3	4

Quarterfinals
3	(Switzerland) R Federer	7^{7}	6
(France) J Benneteau	6^{4}	0

=== Bottom half ===
==== Section 3 ====
First round
(France) J Chardy	6^{7}	2
(France) R Gasquet	7^{9}	6
(Spain) M Granollers	3	7^{7}	2
(Chinese Taipei) Y-h Lu	6	6^{5}	6
(Croatia) I Karlović	7	2	7^{7}
9	(Croatia) M Čilić	5	6	6^{2}
15	(Italy) F Fognini	6^{5}	4
WC	(China) C Wang	7^{7}	6
(United States) D Young	5	4
Q	(Tunisia) M Jaziri	7	6
(France) G Simon	3	6	6
(Spain) G García López	6	0	1

Second round
6	(Czech Republic) T Berdych	6	6
(France) R Gasquet	3	1
(Chinese Taipei) Y-h Lu	6^{6}	3
(Croatia) I Karlović	7^{8}	6
WC	(China) C Wang	0	4
Q	(Tunisia) M Jaziri	6	6
(France) G Simon	5	7	6
4	(Switzerland) S Wawrinka	7	5	4

Third round
6	(Czech Republic) T Berdych	6	6
(Croatia) I Karlović	3	4
Q	(Tunisia) M Jaziri	2	3
(France) G Simon	6	6

Quarterfinals
6	(Czech Republic) T Berdych	6^{4}	6	0
(France) G Simon	7^{7}	4	6

==== Section 4 ====
First round
(Portugal) J Sousa	2	6^{4}
WC	(Argentina) J Mónaco	6	7^{7}
(Uruguay) P Cuevas	5	2
(Croatia) I Dodig	7	6
(Russia) M Youzhny	6	6
12	(Latvia) E Gulbis	4	1
13	(United States) J Isner	7^{7}	1	6
(Spain) P Andújar	6^{5}	6	3
(United States) S Johnson	6	1	6
Q	(Kazakhstan) A Golubev	3	6	3
Q	(Australia) T Kokkinakis	7^{14}	3	4
(Spain) F López	6^{12}	6	6

Second round
8	(Canada) M Raonic	2^{r}
WC	(Argentina) J Mónaco	5
(Croatia) I Dodig	6^{7}	7^{7}	3
(Russia) M Youzhny	7^{9}	6^{4}	6
13	(United States) J Isner	7^{8}	7^{9}
(United States) S Johnson	6^{6}	6^{7}
(Spain) F López	6	7^{8}
2	(Spain) R Nadal	3	6^{6}

Third round
WC	(Argentina) J Mónaco	7	3	2
(Russia) M Youzhny	5	6	6
13	(United States) J Isner	3	4
(Spain) F López	6	6

Quarterfinals
(Russia) M Youzhny	7	4	4
(Spain) F López	5	6	6

== Qualifying ==
=== Seeds ===
1. (Russia) Teymuraz Gabashvili (qualified)
2. (Argentina) Federico Delbonis (first round)
3. (Kazakhstan) Andrey Golubev (qualified)
4. (Australia) Bernard Tomic (qualified)
5. (Australia) Marinko Matosevic (first round)
6. (Tunisia) Malek Jaziri (qualified)
7. (Australia) Sam Groth (qualified)
8. (Serbia) Filip Krajinović (qualifying competition)
9. (Japan) Tatsuma Ito (qualifying competition)
10. (Japan) Go Soeda (first round)
11. (Argentina) Máximo González (qualifying competition)
12. (Lithuania) Ričardas Berankis (first round)
13. (United Kingdom) James Ward (qualified)
14. (Germany) Peter Gojowczyk (qualifying competition)

=== Qualifiers ===
1. (Russia) Teymuraz Gabashvili
2. (Australia) Thanasi Kokkinakis
3. (Kazakhstan) Andrey Golubev
4. (Australia) Bernard Tomic
5. (United Kingdom) James Ward
6. (Tunisia) Malek Jaziri
7. (Australia) Sam Groth

=== Qualifying draw ===
==== First qualifier ====
First round
1	(Russia) Teymuraz Gabashvili	6	6
(India) Somdev Devvarman	2	1
(Japan) Yūichi Sugita	3	1
8	(Serbia) Filip Krajinović	6	6

Qualifying competition
1	(Russia) Teymuraz Gabashvili	2	6	6
8	(Serbia) Filip Krajinović	6	3	0

==== Second qualifier ====
First round
2	(Argentina) Federico Delbonis	3	6	3
(Australia) Thanasi Kokkinakis	6	3	6
WC	(China) Ouyang Bowen	6	5	3
11	(Argentina) Máximo González	3	7	6

Qualifying competition
(Australia) Thanasi Kokkinakis	6	6
11	(Argentina) Máximo González	3	3

==== Third qualifier ====
First round
3	(Kazakhstan) Andrey Golubev	6	6
(China) Li Zhe	2	3
(Chinese Taipei) Jimmy Wang	6^{5}	6	6
12	(Lithuania) Ričardas Berankis	7^{7}	4	4

Qualifying competition
3	(Kazakhstan) Andrey Golubev	6	1	7^{7}
(Chinese Taipei) Jimmy Wang	4	6	6^{5}

==== Fourth qualifier ====
First round
4	(Australia) Bernard Tomic	6	6
WC	(China) Cao Zhaoyi	1	2
WC	(China) Bai Yan	1	3
9	(Japan) Tatsuma Ito	6	6

Qualifying competition
4	(Australia) Bernard Tomic	6	6
9	(Japan) Tatsuma Ito	3	4

==== Fifth qualifier ====
First round
5	(Australia) Marinko Matosevic	4	3
(Serbia) Viktor Troicki	6	6
(United States) Rajeev Ram	6	2^{r}
13	(United Kingdom) James Ward	4	3

Qualifying competition
(Serbia) Viktor Troicki	4	1
13	(United Kingdom) James Ward	6	6

==== Sixth qualifier ====
First round
6	(Tunisia) Malek Jaziri	4	6	6
(Japan) Yasutaka Uchiyama	6	0	3
(Australia) James Duckworth	7	6
10	(Japan) Go Soeda	5	2

Qualifying competition
6	(Tunisia) Malek Jaziri	6	6
(Australia) James Duckworth	4	4

==== Seventh qualifier ====
First round
7	(Australia) Sam Groth	6	6
(Japan) Hiroki Moriya	3	2
WC	(China) Gao Xin	1	1
14	(Germany) Peter Gojowczyk	6	6

Qualifying competition
7	(Australia) Sam Groth	7^{8}	5	6
14	(Germany) Peter Gojowczyk	6^{6}	7	4
