= Édouard Roger-Vasselin =

French tennis player (born 1983)

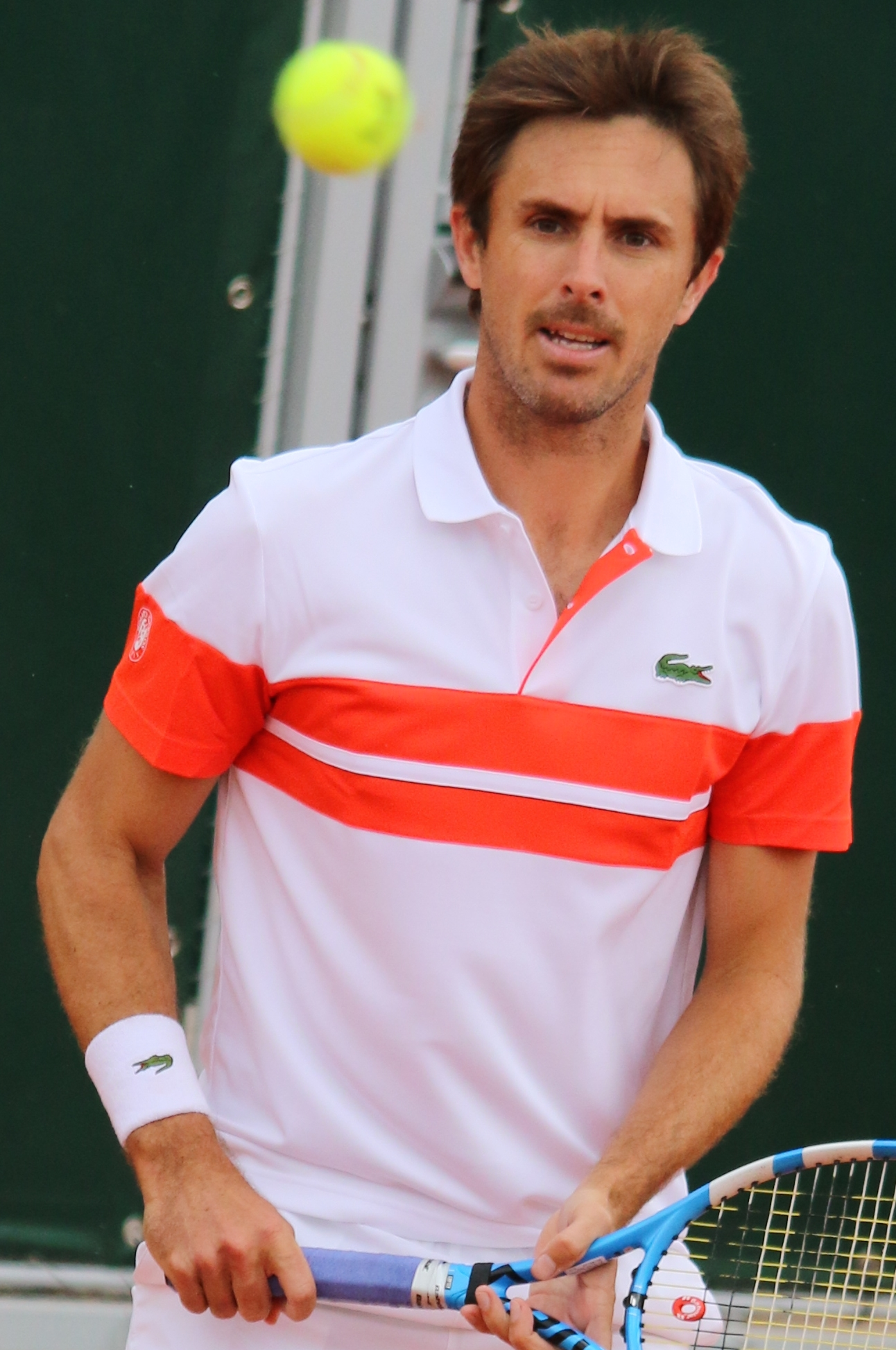
- Roger-Vasselin in 2019
- Country (sports): France
- Residence: Boulogne-Billancourt, France
- Born: 28 November 1983 (age 42) Gennevilliers, France
- Height: 1.88 m (6 ft 2 in)
- Turned pro: 2002
- Plays: Right-handed (two-handed backhand)
- Coach: Dave Marshall
- Prize money: $ 9,056,434

Singles
- Career record: 84–125
- Career titles: 0
- Highest ranking: No. 35 (10 February 2014)

Grand Slam singles results
- Australian Open: 3R (2014)
- French Open: 3R (2007)
- Wimbledon: 3R (2007)
- US Open: 2R (2013)

Doubles
- Career record: 478–327
- Career titles: 30
- Highest ranking: No. 6 (3 November 2014)
- Current ranking: No. 24 (20 July 2026)

Grand Slam doubles results
- Australian Open: QF (2015, 2025)
- French Open: W (2014)
- Wimbledon: F (2016, 2019)
- US Open: QF (2017, 2018)

Other doubles tournaments
- Tour Finals: F (2020)
- Olympic Games: 2R (2024)

Mixed doubles
- Career titles: 1

Grand Slam mixed doubles results
- Australian Open: QF (2018)
- French Open: W (2024)
- Wimbledon: QF (2021, 2022, 2026)
- US Open: F (2022)

Other mixed doubles tournaments
- Olympic Games: 1R (2024)
- Last updated on: 20 July 2026.

Édouard Roger-Vasselin (French pronunciation: [edwaʁ ʁɔʒe vaslɛ̃]; born 28 November 1983) is a French professional tennis player who specializes in doubles. He won two Grand Slam titles in doubles at the 2014 French Open, partnering Julien Benneteau, and mixed doubles at the 2024 French Open, partnering Laura Siegemund. He also finished runner-up at the Wimbledon Championships in both 2016 and 2019, alongside Benneteau and Nicolas Mahut respectively. Roger-Vasselin reached his career-high doubles ranking of world No. 6 in November 2014, and has won 29 doubles and 1 mixed doubles titles on the ATP Tour, including three Masters titles.

In singles, his highest ranking was world No. 35, achieved in February 2014, and he finished runner-up at the 2013 Delray Beach Open and 2014 Chennai Open. Roger-Vasselin's best Grand Slam result in singles was reaching the third round at the French Open and Wimbledon Championships in 2007, and the 2014 Australian Open. He is the son of 1983 French Open semifinalist Christophe Roger-Vasselin.

== Career ==
=== 2007 ===
At the French Open, he reached the third round as a wildcard, after a second-round victory against Radek Štěpánek in five sets, 3–6, 6–1, 0–6, 6–4, 6–4. He also reached the third round at Wimbledon, beating 24th seed Juan Ignacio Chela in straight sets along the way, and made the top 100 for the first time as a result. On 16 July 2007, he reached a career-best ranking of 82.

=== 2009 ===
At the Japan Open, he advanced through the qualifying draw to set up a first round match with 2009 US Open champion Juan Martín del Potro. Ranked No. 189 at the time, Roger-Vasselin stunned the world No. 5, 6–4, 6–4. The match was Roger-Vasselin's first ATP Tour level victory of the season. Roger-Vasselin then defeated Austrian Jürgen Melzer to advance to the third round, where he lost to former world No. 1, Lleyton Hewitt, in straight sets.

=== 2012 ===
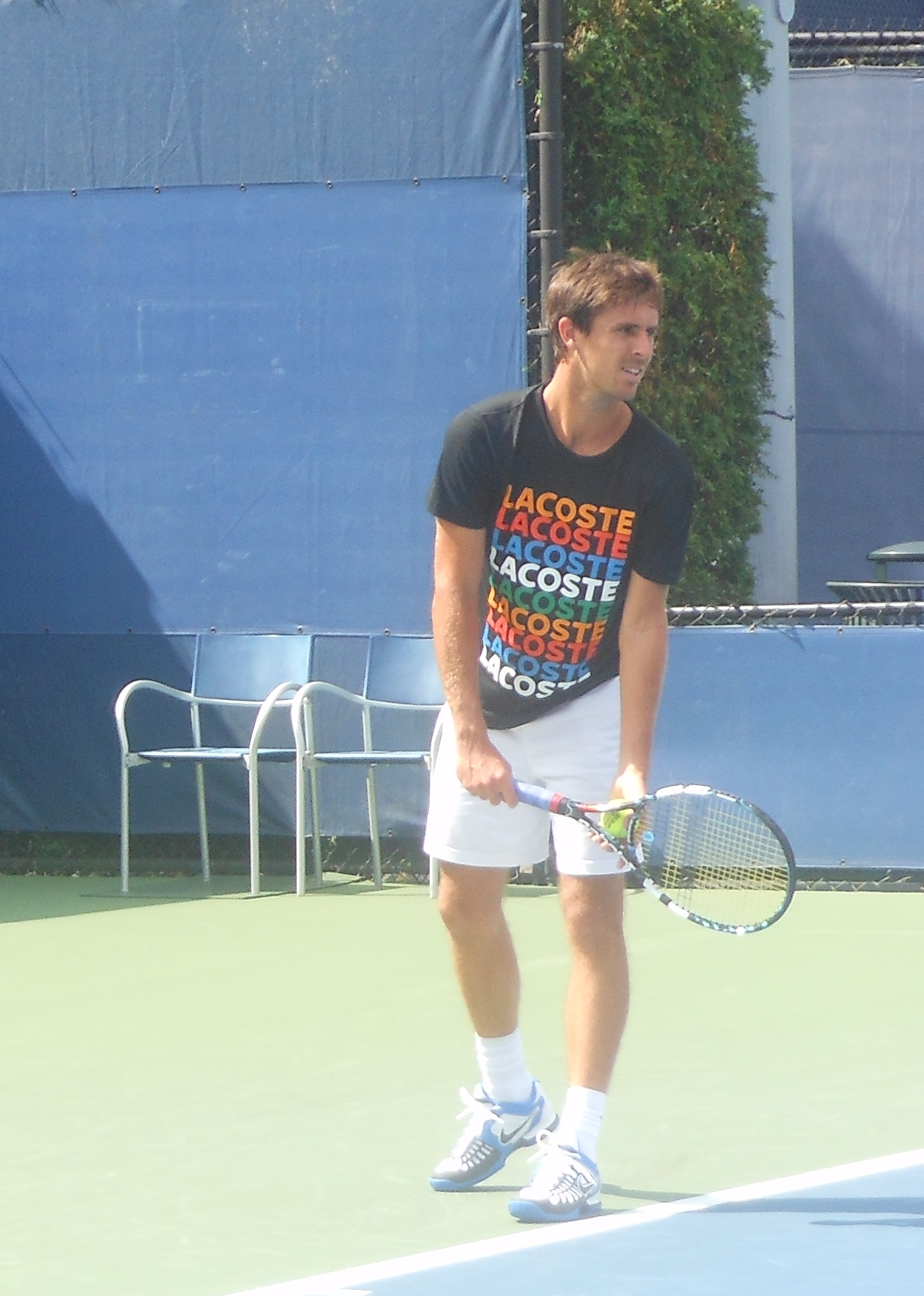
Roger-Vasselin at 2012 US Open

In 2012, Roger-Vasselin had considerable success on the ATP Tour in doubles. He won tournaments in Montpellier, Marseille, and Metz, all partnered with Nicolas Mahut. He also made it to the quarterfinals at Wimbledon for the first time teamed with James Cerretani. They were defeated by the eventual champions Jonathan Marray and Frederik Nielsen in five sets.

=== 2013 ===
At the Delray Beach International Championships, Roger-Vasselin defeated four opponents including top seed John Isner to reach his first ATP tournament final. He lost to Ernests Gulbis for the title. In doubles, he won two titles, at the Hall of Fame Classic in Newport, Rhode Island, partnering Nicolas Mahut and in Atlanta, partnering Dutchman Igor Sijsling.

He made the semifinals in doubles at Wimbledon, partnering Rohan Bopanna.

Vasselin made a breakthrough in the indoor part of the season when he has reached semifinals of the ATP 500 event in Basel, upsetting home favorite Stan Wawrinka in the first round. He lost to Juan Martín del Potro, after winning the first set. He finished the year a career-high No. 53.

=== 2014: French Open doubles champion, ATP Finals debut ===
Roger-Vasselin had a good beginning to his singles campaign, reaching the final in Chennai (lost to Wawrinka). He reached the quarterfinals in Montpellier and Marseille, losing to Jerzy Janowicz and Jo-Wilfried Tsonga, respectively. He also reached the quarterfinals on grass in Eastbourne, losing to Denis Istomin. The rest of his singles season was relatively disappointing.

He and doubles partner Julien Benneteau, however, had a very successful season. They reached the semifinals in Sydney, being eliminated by Daniel Nestor and Nenad Zimonjić. At the Australian Open, they went down in the round of 16 to Max Mirnyi and Mikhail Youzhny. They had another semifinal showing in Rotterdam, losing to Jean-Julien Rojer and Horia Tecău.

The pair won the title in Marseille in February, beating Paul Hanley and Jonathan Marray in the final. Another quarterfinal followed in Acapulco, where they lost to Treat Huey and Dominic Inglot. Then, they went out in the round of 16 in both Indian Wells and Miami. The pair made another quarterfinal, this time at a Masters 1000 event, in Monte Carlo, losing to the Bryan brothers. They followed this up with a semifinal appearance in Nice.

The highlight of the season and of his career was the 2014 French Open title, which he and Benneteau won against the Spanish pair of Marcel Granollers and Marc López.

On grass, they made the semifinals of the Queen's Club tournament, losing to Jamie Murray and John Peers. They followed this up with a quarterfinal appearance at 2014 Wimbledon Championships, where they lost to the French pair of Michaël Llodra and Nicolas Mahut.

On the hard-court North American swing, they reached the quarterfinals (l. to Nestor and Zimonjić) in Toronto, and the semifinals in Cincinnati (l. to Vasek Pospisil and Jack Sock). In Shanghai, they reached the final, losing again to the Bryan brothers.

He qualified for the first time and reached the semifinals at the 2014 ATP World Tour Finals with Benneteau.

=== 2015: Maiden Masters 1000 doubles title ===
He won his maiden Masters title in Cincinnati partnering Daniel Nestor.

=== 2016–2020: Two time Wimbledon and ATP Finals finalist ===
He reached the 2020 ATP Finals partnering Jürgen Melzer in what was the last final of Melzer's career.

=== 2022: Fifth Masters final in five years ===
At Indian Wells, Roger-Vasselin and partner Santiago González advanced to the finals of the Masters 1000 series event, losing to John Isner and Jack Sock. In doing so, Roger-Vasselin became just the second player to reach a Masters 1000 final after major hip surgery. Roger-Vasselin, who had hip surgery in 2021, joined Bob Bryan in this select category. Both Roger-Vasselin and Gonzáles and the Bryan brothers were coached by Dave Marshall during those runs.

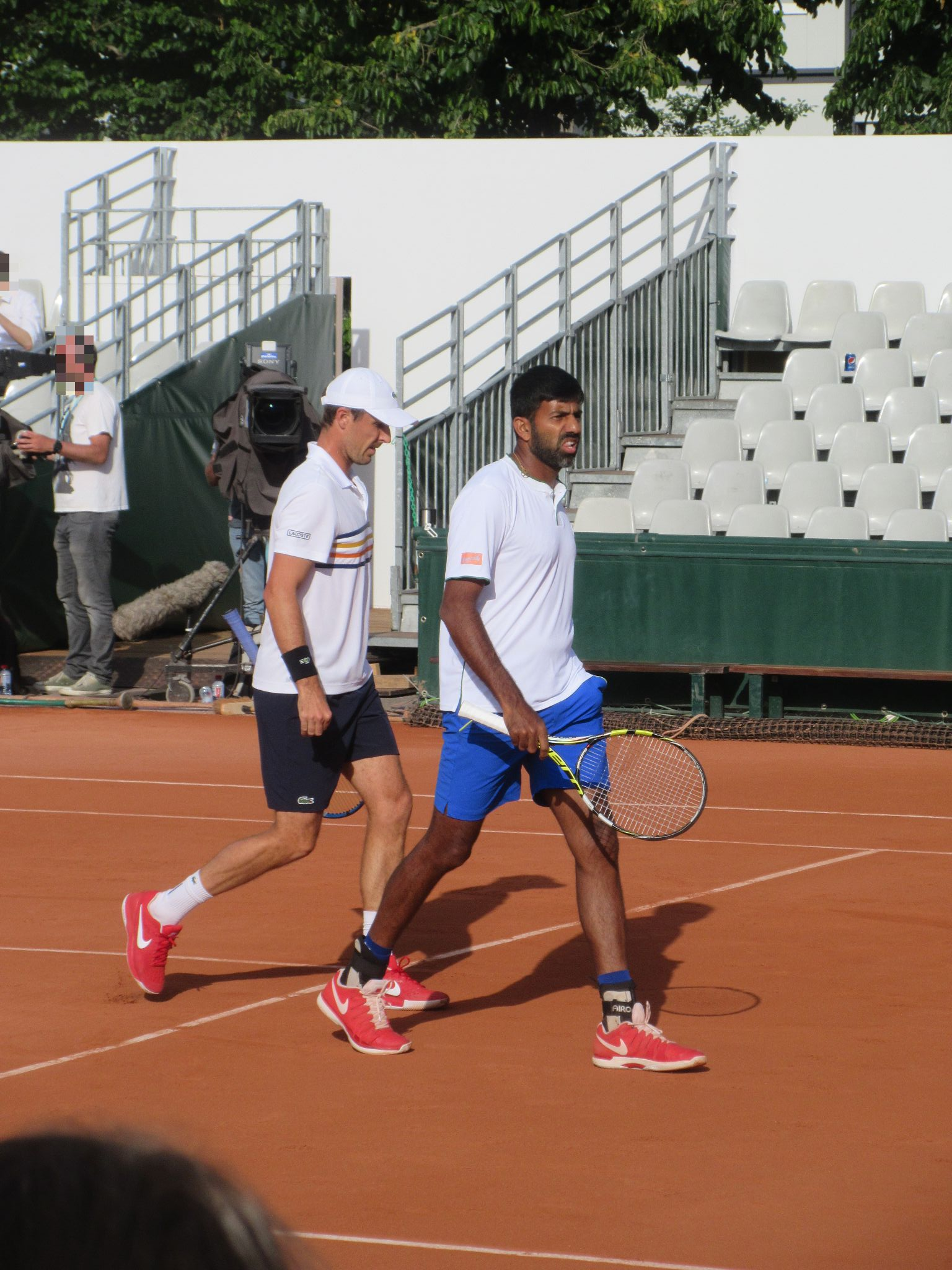
With Rohan Bopanna during the 2018 French Open

=== 2023–2024: Two Masters titles, back to top 10, French Open mixed champion ===
Unseeded he reached his sixth Masters final at the 2023 Miami Open with Santiago González (tennis) after defeating Americans Jackson Withrow and Nathaniel Lammons. He won his second Masters title defeating Nicolas Mahut and Austin Krajicek. In August, he won the 2023 Los Cabos Open, his twenty-sixth title also with S. González.

In October, he won the 2023 Basel Open, his twenty-seventh title. On 2 November, Roger-Vasselin qualified with S. González for the 2023 ATP Finals for the third time in his career. He won the title at the 2023 Rolex Paris Masters with González defeating Bopanna/Ebden.

=== 2025: Marrakech final ===
Edouard Roger-Vasselin and new partner Hugo Nys reached the final at the 2025 Grand Prix Hassan II. At the next tournament, the 2025 Monte-Carlo Masters, they defeated Jamie Murray and Rajeev Ram to advance to the round of 16. They lost to fourth seeds Kevin Krawietz and Tim Puetz in a close match tiebreak.

== Performance timelines ==
Key
W	F	SF	QF	#R	RR	Q#	P#	DNQ	A	Z#	PO	G	S	B	NMS	NTI	P	NH

(W) winner; (F) finalist; (SF) semifinalist; (QF) quarterfinalist; (#R) rounds 4, 3, 2, 1; (RR) round-robin stage; (Q#) qualification round; (P#) preliminary round; (DNQ) did not qualify; (A) absent; (Z#) Davis/Fed Cup Zonal Group (with number indication) or (PO) play-off; (G) gold, (S) silver or (B) bronze Olympic/Paralympic medal; (NMS) not a Masters tournament; (NTI) not a Tier I tournament; (P) postponed; (NH) not held; (SR) strike rate (events won / competed); (W–L) win–loss record.
To avoid confusion and double counting, these charts are updated at the conclusion of a tournament or when the player's participation has ended.

=== Singles ===
Tournament	2007	2008	2009	2010	2011	2012	2013	2014	2015	2016	SR	W–L
Grand Slam tournaments
Australian Open	Q1	1R	Q1	Q3	Q1	2R	2R	3R	2R	Q3	0 / 5	5–5
French Open	3R	Q1	Q2	2R	1R	2R	2R	1R	1R	A	0 / 7	5–7
Wimbledon	3R	1R	1R	Q2	1R	1R	1R	2R	Q3	2R	0 / 8	4–8
US Open	1R	Q2	Q1	Q1	1R	1R	2R	1R	Q1	Q1	0 / 5	1–5
Win–loss	4–3	0–2	0–1	1–1	0–3	2–4	3–4	3–4	1–2	1–1	0 / 25	15–25
ATP Masters 1000
Indian Wells Open	A	A	A	A	A	A	Q1	2R	2R	Q2	0 / 2	2–2
Miami Masters	A	A	A	Q1	A	1R	2R	3R	1R	Q1	0 / 4	2–4
Monte-Carlo Masters	Q1	Q1	A	Q1	Q2	Q2	2R	1R	1R	A	0 / 3	1–3
Madrid Masters^{1}	A	A	A	A	A	Q2	A	1R	Q1	A	0 / 1	0–1
Rome Masters	A	Q2	A	A	A	A	A	1R	A	A	0 / 1	0–1
Canada Masters	A	A	A	A	A	A	A	1R	Q1	A	0 / 1	0–1
Cincinnati Open	A	A	A	A	1R	A	1R	1R	A	A	0 / 3	0–3
Shanghai Masters^{2}	A	A	Q1	Q1	A	A	A	1R	A	Q1	0 / 1	0–1
Paris Masters	Q1	A	Q1	Q2	Q1	Q1	1R	1R	2R	A	0 / 3	1–3
Win–loss	0–0	0–0	0–0	0–0	0–1	0–1	1–4	3–9	2–4	0–0	0 / 19	6–19
Career statistics
Titles / Finals	0 / 0	0 / 0	0 / 0	0 / 0	0 / 0	0 / 0	0 / 1	0 / 1	0 / 0	0 / 0	0 / 2	
Year-end ranking	97	166	153	124	106	102	52	87	123	293		

^{1}Held as Hamburg Masters until 2008, Madrid Masters (clay) 2009–present.
^{2}Held as Madrid Masters (hardcourt) until 2008, and Shanghai Masters 2009–present.

=== Doubles ===
Current through the 2025 French Open.

Tournament	2003	2004	2005	2006	2007	2008	2009	2010	2011	2012	2013	2014	2015	2016	2017	2018	2019	2020	2021	2022	2023	2024	2025	SR	W–L
Grand Slam tournaments
Australian Open	A	A	A	A	A	2R	A	A	1R	A	3R	3R	QF	1R	2R	3R	2R	2R	1R	1R	1R	2R	QF	0 / 15	18–15
French Open	1R	2R	2R	A	1R	1R	1R	2R	1R	2R	2R	W	3R	QF	2R	QF	1R	3R	1R	2R	3R	1R	SF	1 / 22	30–21
Wimbledon	A	A	A	A	A	A	A	A	A	QF	SF	QF	2R	F	2R	2R	F	NH	2R	QF	3R	2R	QF	0 / 13	31–13
US Open	A	A	A	A	1R	A	A	A	A	2R	3R	1R	3R	1R	QF	QF	2R	1R	A	1R	3R	1R	3R	0 / 14	16–14
Win–loss	0–1	1–1	1–1	0–0	0–2	1–2	0–1	1–1	0–2	5–3	9–4	11–3	8–4	8–4	6–4	9–4	7–4	3–3	1–3	3–4	7–4	2–4	12–4	1 / 64	95–63
Year-end championships
ATP Finals	did not qualify											SF	did not qualify					F	DNQ		SF	DNQ		0 / 3	7–6
ATP Masters 1000
Indian Wells Open	A	A	A	A	A	A	A	A	A	A	A	2R	1R	SF	1R	1R	1R	NH	A	F	SF	QF	2R	0 / 10	14–9
Miami Open	A	A	A	A	A	A	A	A	A	A	1R	2R	2R	1R	A	2R	SF	NH	1R	2R	W	QF	2R	1/ 11	15–10
Monte-Carlo Masters	A	A	A	A	A	A	A	A	A	1R	A	QF	QF	2R	2R	SF	2R	NH	2R	1R	1R	QF	2R	0 / 12	11–12
Madrid Open	A	A	A	A	A	A	A	A	A	A	A	1R	2R	A	F	2R	1R	NH	1R	1R	SF	1R	A	0 / 9	6–9
Italian Open	A	A	A	A	A	A	A	A	A	A	A	2R	A	SF	1R	2R	1R	SF	1R	1R	1R	2R	A	0 / 10	7–10
Canada Open	A	A	A	A	A	A	A	A	A	A	A	QF	F	1R	QF	1R	1R	NH	A	1R	QF	2R	2R	0 / 10	11–10
Cincinnati Open	A	A	A	A	A	A	A	A	A	A	SF	SF	W	1R	2R	2R	2R	2R	A	SF	SF	2R	2R	1 / 12	19–11
Shanghai Masters	not held						A	A	A	A	2R	F	SF	1R	1R	1R	SF	NH			2R	SF	1R	0 / 10	11–10
Paris Masters	A	A	A	A	1R	A	A	1R	2R	1R	QF	2R	2R	2R	2R	2R	2R	SF	A	2R	W	2R	2R	1 / 16	16–15
Win–loss	0–0	0–0	0–0	0–0	0–1	0–0	0–0	0–1	1–1	0–2	3–4	9–9	14–7	7–8	8–8	5–9	8–9	6–3	1–4	9–8	21–7	13–9	6–7	2 / 99	110–96
Career statistics
Titles	0	0	0	0	0	0	0	0	0	3	3	2	3	2	1	2	4	1	1	1	5	0	1	29	
Finals	0	0	0	0	0	0	0	0	0	3	4	3	5	3	4	5	6	3	1	3	5	1	4	50	
Overall win–loss	0–1	1–1	1–1	0–0	1–5	1–2	0–1	4–5	3–5	22–13	34–19	35–20	37–16	27–18	30–21	41–26	38–21	26–18	11–13	30–32	54–26	19–15	36–22	463–312	
Year-end ranking	324	320	191	291	293	219	170	98	133	43	17	7	17	17	26	24	16	15	42	32	11	40	17	60%	

=== Mixed doubles ===
Tournament	2008	...	2012	2013	2014	2015	2016	2017	2018	2019	2020	2021	2022	2023	2024	2025	SR	W–L	Win%
Grand Slam tournaments
Australian Open	A		A	A	A	A	A	1R	QF	2R	2R	A	A	1R	1R	A	0 / 6	4–6	40%
French Open	1R		2R	1R	1R	1R	SF	SF	2R	2R	NH	1R	A	1R	W	QF	1 / 13	16–12	57%
Wimbledon	A		A	A	A	2R	A	2R	3R	3R	NH	QF	QF	1R	A	A	0 / 7	6–7	46%
US Open	A		A	2R	A	A	A	1R	QF	2R	NH	A	F	A	A	A	0 / 5	8–5	62%
Win–loss	0–1		1–1	1–2	0–1	1–2	3–1	3–4	6–4	4–4	1–1	1–2	6–2	0–3	5–1	2–1	1 / 31	34–30	53%

== Significant finals ==
=== Grand Slam finals ===
==== Doubles: 3 (1 title, 2 runner-ups) ====
Result	Year	Championship	Surface	Partner	Opponents	Score
Win	2014	French Open	Clay	(France) Julien Benneteau	(Spain) Marcel Granollers (Spain) Marc López	6–3, 7–6^{(7–1)}
Loss	2016	Wimbledon	Grass	(France) Julien Benneteau	(France) Pierre-Hugues Herbert (France) Nicolas Mahut	4–6, 6–7^{(1–7)}, 3–6
Loss	2019	Wimbledon	Grass	(France) Nicolas Mahut	(Colombia) Juan Sebastián Cabal (Colombia) Robert Farah	7–6^{(7–5)}, 6–7^{(5–7)}, 6–7^{(6–8)}, 7–6^{(7–5)}, 3–6

==== Mixed doubles: 2 (1 title, 1 runner-up) ====
Result	Year	Championship	Surface	Partner	Opponents	Score
Loss	2022	US Open	Hard	(Belgium) Kirsten Flipkens	(Australia) Storm Sanders (Australia) John Peers	6–4, 4–6, [7–10]
Win	2024	French Open	Clay	(Germany) Laura Siegemund	(United States) Desirae Krawczyk (United Kingdom) Neal Skupski	6–4, 7–5

=== Year-end championships ===
==== Doubles: 1 (1 runner-up) ====
Result	Year	Championship	Surface	Partner	Opponents	Score
Loss	2020	ATP Finals, London	Hard (i)	(Austria) Jürgen Melzer	(Netherlands) Wesley Koolhof (Croatia) Nikola Mektić	6–2, 3–6, [5–10]

=== Masters 1000 finals ===
==== Doubles: 7 (3 titles, 4 runner-ups) ====
Result	Year	Tournament	Surface	Partner	Opponents	Score
Loss	2014	Shanghai Masters	Hard	(France) Julien Benneteau	(United States) Bob Bryan (United States) Mike Bryan	3–6, 6–7^{(3–7)}
Loss	2015	Canadian Open	Hard	(Canada) Daniel Nestor	(United States) Bob Bryan (United States) Mike Bryan	6–7^{(5–7)}, 6–3, [6–10]
Win	2015	Cincinnati Masters	Hard	(Canada) Daniel Nestor	(Poland) Marcin Matkowski (Serbia) Nenad Zimonjić	6–2, 6–2
Loss	2017	Madrid Open	Clay	(France) Nicolas Mahut	(Poland) Łukasz Kubot (Brazil) Marcelo Melo	5–7, 3–6
Loss	2022	Indian Wells Masters	Hard	(Mexico) Santiago González	(United States) John Isner (United States) Jack Sock	6–7^{(4–7)}, 3–6
Win	2023	Miami Open	Hard	(Mexico) Santiago González	(United States) Austin Krajicek (France) Nicolas Mahut	7–6^{(7–4)}, 7–5
Win	2023	Paris	Hard (i)	(Mexico) Santiago González	(India) Rohan Bopanna (Australia) Matthew Ebden	6–2, 5–7, [10–7]

== ATP Tour finals ==
=== Singles: 2 (2 runner-ups) ===
Legend Grand Slam tournaments (0–0) ATP World Tour Masters 1000 (0–0) ATP World Tour 500 Series (0–0) ATP World Tour 250 Series (0–2)	Finals by surface Hard (0–2) Clay (0–0) Grass (0–0)	Finals by setting Outdoor (0–2) Indoor (0–0)

Result	W–L	Date	Tournament	Tier	Surface	Opponent	Score
Loss	0–1	Mar 2013	Delray Beach Open, United States	250 Series	Hard	(Latvia) Ernests Gulbis	6–7^{(3–7)}, 3–6
Loss	0–2	Jan 2014	Chennai Open, India	250 Series	Hard	(Switzerland) Stan Wawrinka	5–7, 2–6

=== Doubles: 52 (30 titles, 22 runner-ups) ===
Legend Grand Slam tournaments (1–2) ATP World Tour Finals (0–1) ATP World Tour Masters 1000 (3–4) ATP World Tour 500 Series (7–8) ATP World Tour 250 Series (19–7)	Finals by surface Hard (26–15) Clay (2–4) Grass (2–3)	Finals by setting Outdoor (13–14) Indoor (17–8)

Result	W–L	Date	Tournament	Tier	Surface	Partner	Opponents	Score
Win	1–0	Feb 2012	Open Sud de France, France	250 Series	Hard (i)	(France) Nicolas Mahut	(Australia) Paul Hanley (United Kingdom) Jamie Murray	6–4, 7–6^{(7–4)}
Win	2–0	Feb 2012	Open 13, France	250 Series	Hard (i)	(France) Nicolas Mahut	(Germany) Dustin Brown (France) Jo-Wilfried Tsonga	3–6, 6–3, [10–6]
Win	3–0	Sep 2012	Moselle Open, France	250 Series	Hard (i)	(France) Nicolas Mahut	(Sweden) Johan Brunström (Denmark) Frederik Nielsen	7–6^{(7–3)}, 6–4
Win	4–0	Jul 2013	Hall of Fame Championships, United States	250 Series	Grass	(France) Nicolas Mahut	(United States) Tim Smyczek (United States) Rhyne Williams	6–7^{(4–7)}, 6–2, [10–5]
Loss	4–1	Jul 2013	Colombia Open, Colombia	250 Series	Hard	(Netherlands) Igor Sijsling	(India) Purav Raja (India) Divij Sharan	6–7^{(4–7)}, 6–7^{(3–7)}
Win	5–1	Jul 2013	Atlanta Open, United States	250 Series	Hard	(Netherlands) Igor Sijsling	(United Kingdom) Colin Fleming (United Kingdom) Jonathan Marray	7–6^{(8–6)}, 6–3
Win	6–1	Oct 2013	Japan Open, Japan	500 Series	Hard	(India) Rohan Bopanna	(United Kingdom) Jamie Murray (Australia) John Peers	7–6^{(7–5)}, 6–4
Win	7–1	Feb 2014	Open 13, France (2)	250 Series	Hard (i)	(France) Julien Benneteau	(Australia) Paul Hanley (United Kingdom) Jamie Murray	4–6, 7–6^{(8–6)}, [13–11]
Win	8–1	Jun 2014	French Open, France	Grand Slam	Clay	(France) Julien Benneteau	(Spain) Marcel Granollers (Spain) Marc López	6–3, 7–6^{(7–1)}
Loss	8–2	Oct 2014	Shanghai Masters, China	Masters 1000	Hard	(France) Julien Benneteau	(United States) Bob Bryan (United States) Mike Bryan	3–6, 6–7^{(1–7)}
Win	9–2	Jul 2015	Colombia Open, Columbia	250 Series	Hard	(Czech Republic) Radek Štěpánek	(Croatia) Mate Pavić (New Zealand) Michael Venus	7–5, 6–3
Loss	9–3	Aug 2015	Canadian Open, Canada	Masters 1000	Hard	(Canada) Daniel Nestor	(United States) Bob Bryan (United States) Mike Bryan	6–7^{(5–7)}, 6–3, [6–10]
Win	10–3	Aug 2015	Cincinnati Masters, United States	Masters 1000	Hard	(Canada) Daniel Nestor	(Poland) Marcin Matkowski (Serbia) Nenad Zimonjić	6–2, 6–2
Win	11–3	Sep 2015	Moselle Open, France (2)	250 Series	Hard (i)	(Poland) Łukasz Kubot	(France) Pierre-Hugues Herbert (France) Nicolas Mahut	2–6, 6–3, [10–7]
Loss	11–4	Oct 2015	China Open, China	500 Series	Hard	(Canada) Daniel Nestor	(Canada) Vasek Pospisil (United States) Jack Sock	6–3, 3–6, [6–10]
Loss	11–5	Jul 2016	Wimbledon Championships, United Kingdom	Grand Slam	Grass	(France) Julien Benneteau	(France) Pierre-Hugues Herbert (France) Nicolas Mahut	4–6, 6–7^{(1–7)}, 3–6
Win	12–5	Jul 2016	Washington Open, United States	500 Series	Hard	(Canada) Daniel Nestor	(Poland) Łukasz Kubot (Austria) Alexander Peya	7–6^{(7–3)}, 7–6^{(7–4)}
Win	13–5	Oct 2016	European Open, Belgium	250 Series	Hard (i)	(Canada) Daniel Nestor	(France) Pierre-Hugues Herbert (France) Nicolas Mahut	6–4, 6–4
Loss	13–6	May 2017	Madrid Open, Spain	Masters 1000	Clay	(France) Nicolas Mahut	(Poland) Łukasz Kubot (Brazil) Marcelo Melo	5–7, 3–6
Loss	13–7	Jun 2017	Queen's Club Championships, United Kingdom	500 Series	Grass	(France) Julien Benneteau	(United Kingdom) Jamie Murray (Brazil) Bruno Soares	2–6, 3–6
Win	14–7	Sep 2017	Moselle Open, France (3)	250 Series	Hard (i)	(France) Julien Benneteau	(Netherlands) Wesley Koolhof (New Zealand) Artem Sitak	7–5, 6–3
Loss	14–8	Oct 2017	Swiss Indoors, Switzerland	500 Series	Hard (i)	(France) Fabrice Martin	(Croatia) Ivan Dodig (Spain) Marcel Granollers	5–7, 6–7^{(6–8)}
Loss	14–9	Apr 2018	Grand Prix Hassan II, Morocco	250 Series	Clay	(France) Benoît Paire	(Croatia) Nikola Mektić (Austria) Alexander Peya	5–7, 6–3, [7–10]
Loss	14–10	Aug 2018	Washington Open, United States	500 Series	Hard	(United States) Mike Bryan	(United Kingdom) Jamie Murray (Brazil) Bruno Soares	6–3, 3–6, [4–10]
Win	15–10	Sep 2018	Moselle Open, France (4)	250 Series	Hard (i)	(France) Nicolas Mahut	(United Kingdom) Ken Skupski (United Kingdom) Neal Skupski	6–1, 7–5
Win	16–10	Oct 2018	European Open, Belgium (2)	250 Series	Hard (i)	(France) Nicolas Mahut	(Brazil) Marcelo Demoliner (Mexico) Santiago González	6–4, 7–5
Loss	16–11	Oct 2018	Vienna Open, Austria	500 Series	Hard (i)	(United States) Mike Bryan	(United Kingdom) Joe Salisbury (United Kingdom) Neal Skupski	6–7^{(5–7)}, 3–6
Win	17–11	Feb 2019	Open Sud de France, France (2)	250 Series	Hard (i)	(Croatia) Ivan Dodig	(France) Benjamin Bonzi (France) Antoine Hoang	6–3, 6–3
Win	18–11	May 2019	Lyon Open, France	250 Series	Clay	(Croatia) Ivan Dodig	(United Kingdom) Ken Skupski (United Kingdom) Neal Skupski	6–4, 6–3
Loss	18–12	Jul 2019	Wimbledon Championships, United Kingdom	Grand Slam	Grass	(France) Nicolas Mahut	(Colombia) Juan Sebastián Cabal (Colombia) Robert Farah	7–6^{(7–5)}, 6–7^{(5–7)}, 6–7^{(6–8)}, 7–6^{(7–5)}, 3–6
Loss	18–13	Sep 2019	Moselle Open, France	250 Series	Hard (i)	(France) Nicolas Mahut	(Sweden) Robert Lindstedt (Germany) Jan-Lennard Struff	6–2, 6–7^{(1–7)}, [4–10]
Win	19–13	Oct 2019	Japan Open, Japan (2)	500 Series	Hard	(France) Nicolas Mahut	(Croatia) Nikola Mektić (Croatia) Franko Škugor	7–6^{(9–7)}, 6–4
Win	20–13	Oct 2019	Stockholm Open, Sweden	250 Series	Hard (i)	(Finland) Henri Kontinen	(Croatia) Mate Pavić (Brazil) Bruno Soares	6–4, 6–2
Win	21–13	Oct 2020	St. Petersburg Open, Russia	500 Series	Hard (i)	(Austria) Jürgen Melzer	(Brazil) Marcelo Demoliner (Netherlands) Matwé Middelkoop	6–2, 7–6^{(7–4)}
Loss	21–14	Nov 2020	Sofia Open, Bulgaria	250 Series	Hard (i)	(Austria) Jürgen Melzer	(United Kingdom) Jamie Murray (United Kingdom) Neal Skupski	Walkover
Loss	21–15	Nov 2020	ATP Finals, United Kingdom	Tour Finals	Hard (i)	(Austria) Jürgen Melzer	(Netherlands) Wesley Koolhof (Croatia) Nikola Mektić	6–2, 3–6, [5–10]
Win	22–15	Feb 2021	Open Sud de France, France (3)	250 Series	Hard (i)	(Finland) Henri Kontinen	(Israel) Jonathan Erlich (Belarus) Andrei Vasilevski	6–2, 7–5
Loss	22–16	Mar 2022	Indian Wells Masters, United States	Masters 1000	Hard	(Mexico) Santiago González	(United States) John Isner (United States) Jack Sock	6–7^{(4–7)}, 3–6
Win	23–16	Oct 2022	Firenze Open, Italy	250 Series	Hard (i)	(France) Nicolas Mahut	(Croatia) Ivan Dodig (United States) Austin Krajicek	7–6^{(7–4)}, 6–3
Loss	23–17	Oct 2022	Swiss Indoors, Switzerland	500 Series	Hard (i)	(France) Nicolas Mahut	(Croatia) Ivan Dodig (United States) Austin Krajicek	4–6, 6–7^{(5–7)}
Win	24–17	Feb 2023	Open 13, France (3)	250 Series	Hard (i)	(Mexico) Santiago González	(France) Nicolas Mahut (France) Fabrice Martin	4–6, 7–6^{(7–4)}, [10–7]
Win	25–17	Mar 2023	Miami Open, United States	Masters 1000	Hard	(Mexico) Santiago González	(France) Nicolas Mahut (United States) Austin Krajicek	7–6^{(7–4)}, 7–5
Win	26–17	Aug 2023	Los Cabos Open, Mexico	250 Series	Hard	(Mexico) Santiago González	(Australia) Andrew Harris (Germany) Dominik Koepfer	6–4, 7–5
Win	27–17	Oct 2023	Swiss Indoors, Switzerland	500 Series	Hard (i)	(Mexico) Santiago González	(Monaco) Hugo Nys (Poland) Jan Zieliński	6–7^{(8–10)}, 7–6^{(7–3)}, [10–1]
Win	28–17	Oct 2023	Paris Masters, France	Masters 1000	Hard (i)	(Mexico) Santiago González	(India) Rohan Bopanna (Australia) Matthew Ebden	6–2, 5–7, [10–7]
Loss	28–18	Jul 2024	Hamburg Open, Germany	500 Series	Clay	(France) Fabien Reboul	(Germany) Kevin Krawietz (Germany) Tim Pütz	6–7^{(8–10)}, 2–6
Loss	28–19	Apr 2025	Grand Prix Hassan II, Morocco	250 Series	Clay	(Monaco) Hugo Nys	(Czech Republic) Patrik Rikl (Czech Republic) Petr Nouza	3–6, 4–6
Loss	28–20	Jul 2025	Washington Open, United States	500 Series	Hard	(Monaco) Hugo Nys	(Italy) Simone Bolelli (Italy) Andrea Vavassori	3–6, 4–6
Win	29–20	Sep 2025	Japan Open, Japan (3)	500 Series	Hard	(Monaco) Hugo Nys	(India) Rohan Bopanna (Japan) Takeru Yuzuki	7–5, 7–5
Loss	29–21	Oct 2025	European Open, Belgium	250 Series	Hard (i)	(Monaco) Hugo Nys	(United States) Christian Harrison (United States) Evan King	6–7^{(10–12)}, 6–7^{(5–7)}
Win	30–21	Jun 2026	Eastbourne International, United Kingdom	250 Series	Grass	(Monaco) Hugo Nys	(Argentina) Guido Andreozzi (France) Manuel Guinard	6–3, 4–6, [10–8]
Loss	34–22	Nov 2026	Stockholm Open, Sweden	250 Series	Hard (i)	(Croatia) Nikola Mektić	(Sweden) Erik Grevelius (Sweden) Adam Heinonen	3–6, 4–6

== ATP Challenger and ITF Tour finals ==
=== Singles: 16 (7–9) ===
Legend (singles) ATP Challenger Tour (4–7) ITF Futures Tour (3–2)	Finals by surface Hard (4–5) Clay (3–4) Grass (0–0) Carpet (0–0)

Result	W–L	Date	Tournament	Tier	Surface	Opponent	Score
Win	1–0	Jul 2002	Denmark F1, Copenhagen	Futures	Clay	(Russia) Roko Karanušić	6–2, 6–3
Loss	1–1	Aug 2002	Estonia F1, Pärnu	Futures	Clay	(Netherlands) Sander Hommel	5–7, 6–3, 4–6
Win	2–1	Jun 2005	France F8, Blois	Futures	Clay	(France) Nicolas Renavand	4–6, 6–4, 6–2
Win	3–1	Jul 2005	Montauban, France	Challenger	Clay	(Croatia) Roko Karanušić	6–4, 6–4
Loss	3–2	Aug 2006	St. Petersburg, Russia	Challenger	Clay	(France) David Guez	0–6, 2–6
Loss	3–3	Aug 2006	Samarkand, Uzbekistan	Challenger	Clay	(Serbia) Janko Tipsarević	3–6, 2–6
Win	4–3	Oct 2006	France F16, Nevers	Futures	Hard	(Switzerland) Michael Lammer	4–6, 6–2, 6–2
Loss	4–4	Oct 2006	France F17, Saint-Dizier	Futures	Hard	(France) Laurent Recouderc	5–7, 3–6
Loss	4–5	Feb 2007	Besançon, France	Challenger	Hard	(Latvia) Ernests Gulbis	4–6, 6–3, 4–6
Loss	4–6	Oct 2008	Mons, Belgium	Challenger	Hard	(Russia) Teymuraz Gabashvili	4–6, 4–6
Win	5–6	Mar 2010	Sarajevo, Bosnia and Herzegovina	Challenger	Hard (i)	(Slovakia) Karol Beck	6–7^{(5–7)}, 6–3, 1–0 ret.
Loss	5–7	Jul 2010	Orbetello, Italy	Challenger	Clay	(Spain) Pablo Andújar	4–6, 3–6
Loss	5–8	Sep 2010	Saint-Rémy-de-Provence, France	Challenger	Hard	(Poland) Jerzy Janowicz	6–3, 6–7^{(8–10)}, 6–7^{(6–8)}
Win	6–8	Jul 2011	Granby, Canada	Challenger	Hard	(Germany) Matthias Bachinger	7–6^{(11–9)}, 4–6, 6–1
Win	7–8	Sep 2011	Saint-Rémy-de-Provence, France	Challenger	Hard	(France) Arnaud Clément	6–4, 6–3
Loss	7–9	Apr 2015	Guadeloupe, France	Challenger	Hard	(Belgium) Ruben Bemelmans	6–7^{(6–8)}, 3–6

=== Doubles: 34 (18–16) ===
Legend (doubles) ATP Challenger Tour (16–9) ITF Futures Tour (2–7)	Finals by surface Hard (11–9) Clay (6–6) Grass (1–0) Carpet (0–1)

Result	W–L	Date	Tournament	Tier	Surface	Partner	Opponents	Score
Win	1–0	Jan 2003	France F1, Grasse	Futures	Clay	(France) Nicolas Mahut	(France) Thierry Ascione (France) Jérôme Haehnel	6–3, 1–6, 6–2
Win	2–0	Jan 2003	France F2, Angers	Futures	Clay	(France) Nicolas Mahut	(France) Clément Morel (France) Laurent Recouderc	6–1, 7–6^{(7–0)}
Loss	2–1	Apr 2003	France F9, Saint-Brieuc	Futures	Clay	(France) Fabrice Betencourt	(Switzerland) Michael Lammer (Switzerland) Roman Valent	walkover
Loss	2–2	Apr 2003	Germany F1, Riemerling	Futures	Clay	(France) Jo-Wilfried Tsonga	(Sweden) Robert Lindstedt (Sweden) Fredrik Lovén	4–6, 1–6
Loss	2–3	Jun 2003	France F11, Toulon	Futures	Clay	(France) Pierrick Ysern	(Argentina) Brian Dabul (Argentina) Gustavo Marcaccio	4–6, 6–7^{(5–7)}
Loss	2–4	Oct 2003	France F21, La Roche-sur-Yon	Futures	Hard	(France) Laurent Recouderc	(France) Marc Gicquel (France) Jean-Baptiste Perlant	2–6, 0–6
Loss	2–5	Jan 2004	United Arab Emirates F1, Dubai	Futures	Hard	(France) Julien Jeanpierre	(Germany) Ivo Klec (Czech Republic) Jaroslav Levinský	4–6, 5–7
Loss	2–6	Mar 2004	France F4, Lille	Futures	Hard	(France) Marc Gicquel	(France) Jean-François Bachelot (France) Jean-Michel Pequery	6–7^{(4–7)}, 3–6
Win	3–6	Jul 2005	Scheveningen, Netherlands	Challenger	Clay	(France) Julien Benneteau	(Belgium) Steve Darcis (Belgium) Kristof Vliegen	5–7, 7–5, 7–6^{(7–5)}
Win	4–6	Jul 2005	Tampere, Finland	Challenger	Clay	(France) Marc Gicquel	(Poland) Adam Chadaj (Poland) Filip Urban	6–4, 4–6, 6–1
Loss	4–7	Jul 2006	Montauban, France	Challenger	Clay	(France) Marc Gicquel	(Uruguay) Pablo Cuevas (Chile) Adrián García	3–6, 6–4, [8–10]
Loss	4–8	Jul 2006	Scheveningen, Netherlands	Challenger	Clay	(France) Marc Gicquel	(Spain) Guillermo García López (Spain) Salvador Navarro Gutiérrez	4–6, 6–0, [9–11]
Win	5–8	Jul 2006	Tampere, Finland	Challenger	Clay	(France) Thierry Ascione	(Finland) Lauri Kiiski (Finland) Tero Vilen	5–7, 6–2, [12–10]
Loss	5–9	Aug 2006	St. Petersburg, Russia	Challenger	Clay	(France) David Guez	(Uzbekistan) Murad Inoyatov (Uzbekistan) Denis Istomin	6–4, 4–6, [5–10]
Loss	5–10	Jan 2007	Nouméa, New Caledonia	Challenger	Hard	(France) Thierry Ascione	(United States) Phillip Simmonds (United States) Alex Kuznetsov	6–7^{(5–7)}, 3–6
Loss	5–11	Feb 2007	France F2, Feucherolles	Futures	Hard	(France) Ludwig Pellerin	(France) Adrian Mannarino (France) Josselin Ouanna	4–6, 5–7
Win	6–11	Jun 2008	Surbiton, Great Britain	Challenger	Grass	(France) Arnaud Clément	(Israel) Harel Levy (United States) Jim Thomas	7–6^{(7–4)}, 6–7^{(3–7)}, [10–7]
Win	7–11	Mar 2009	Cherbourg, France	Challenger	Hard	(France) Arnaud Clément	(Austria) Martin Fischer (Austria) Martin Slanar	4–6, 6–2, [10–3]
Win	8–11	Aug 2009	Segovia, Spain	Challenger	Hard	(France) Nicolas Mahut	(Ukraine) Sergiy Stakhovsky (Croatia) Lovro Zovko	6–7^{(4–7)}, 6–3, [10–8]
Win	9–11	Jan 2010	Nouméa, New Caledonia	Challenger	Hard	(France) Nicolas Devilder	(Italy) Flavio Cipolla (Italy) Simone Vagnozzi	5–7, 6–2, [10–8]
Win	10–11	Mar 2010	Cherbourg, France	Challenger	Hard	(France) Nicolas Mahut	(India) Harsh Mankad (Canada) Adil Shamasdin	6–2, 6–4
Win	11–11	Mar 2010	Sarajevo, Bosnia and Herzegovina	Challenger	Hard	(France) Nicolas Mahut	(Croatia) Ivan Dodig (Czech Republic) Lukáš Rosol	7–6^{(8–6)}, 6–7^{(7–9)}, [10–5]
Win	12–11	May 2010	Bordeaux, France	Challenger	Clay	(France) Nicolas Mahut	(Slovakia) Karol Beck (Czech Republic) Leoš Friedl	5–7, 6–3, [10–7]
Win	13–11	Sep 2010	Saint-Rémy, France	Challenger	Hard	(Luxembourg) Gilles Müller	(Latvia) Andis Juška (Latvia) Deniss Pavlovs	6–0, 2–6, [13–11]
Loss	13–12	Mar 2011	Cherbourg, France	Challenger	Hard	(France) Nicolas Mahut	(France) Pierre-Hugues Herbert (France) Nicolas Renavand	6–3, 4–6, {5-10]
Win	14–12	Jul 2011	Granby, Canada	Challenger	Hard	(Slovakia) Karol Beck	(Germany) Matthias Bachinger (Germany) Frank Moser	6–1, 6–3
Win	15–12	Sep 2011	St. Remy, France	Challenger	Hard	(France) Pierre-Hugues Herbert	(France) Arnaud Clément (France) Nicolas Renavand	6–0, 4–6, [10–7]
Loss	15–13	Oct 2011	Mons, Belgium	Challenger	Hard	(France) Kenny de Schepper	(Sweden) Johan Brunström (United Kingdom) Ken Skupski	6–7^{(4–7)}, 3–6
Loss	15–14	Oct 2011	Rennes, France	Challenger	Carpet	(France) Kenny de Schepper	(Germany) Martin Emmrich (Sweden) Andreas Siljeström	4–6, 4–6
Loss	15–15	Oct 2012	Mons, Belgium	Challenger	Hard	(France) Michaël Llodra	(Poland) Tomasz Bednarek (Poland) Jerzy Janowicz	5–7, 6–4, [2–10]
Win	16–15	Jan 2016	Nouméa, New Caledonia	Challenger	Hard	(France) Julien Benneteau	(France) Grégoire Barrère (France) Tristan Lamasine	7–6^{(7–4)}, 3–6, [10–5]
Win	17–15	Nov 2016	Mouilleron-le-Captif, France	Challenger	Hard	(France) Jonathan Eysseric	(Sweden) Johan Brunström (Sweden) Andreas Siljeström	6–7^{(1–7)}, 7–6^{(7–3)}, [11–9]
Win	18–15	Sep 2022	Orléans, France	Challenger	Hard (i)	(France) Nicolas Mahut	(Belgium) Michael Geerts (Tunisia) Skander Mansouri	6–2, 6–4
Loss	18–16	Mar 2026	Phoenix, United States	Challenger	Hard	(Monaco) Hugo Nys	(Ecuador) Diego Hidalgo (United States) Patrik Trhac	6–7^{(6–8)}, 6–3, [4–10]
