= 2014 Shanghai Rolex Masters – Doubles =

Doubles
- 2014 Shanghai Rolex Masters

Final
- Champions: (United States) Bob Bryan (United States) Mike Bryan
- Runners-up: (France) Julien Benneteau (France) Édouard Roger-Vasselin
- Score: 6–3, 7–6^{(7–3)}

Events
Singles	Doubles
- Shanghai Masters

Bob Bryan and Mike Bryan defeated Julien Benneteau and Édouard Roger-Vasselin in the final, 6–3, 7–6^{(7–3)} to win the doubles tennis title at the 2014 Shanghai Masters. They completed the career Golden Masters with the win.

Ivan Dodig and Marcelo Melo were the defending champions, but lost in the quarterfinals to Rohan Bopanna and Florin Mergea.

== Seeds ==
All seeds receive a bye into the second round.

1. (United States) Bob Bryan / (United States) Mike Bryan (champions)
2. (Canada) Daniel Nestor / (Serbia) Nenad Zimonjić (second round)
3. (Austria) Alexander Peya / (Brazil) Bruno Soares (quarterfinals)
4. (Croatia) Ivan Dodig / (Brazil) Marcelo Melo (quarterfinals)
5. (France) Julien Benneteau / (France) Édouard Roger-Vasselin (final)
6. (Spain) Marcel Granollers / (Spain) Marc López (semifinals)
7. (Canada) Vasek Pospisil / (United States) Jack Sock (second round)
8. (Netherlands) Jean-Julien Rojer / (Romania) Horia Tecău (second round)

== Draw ==
Key

- Q = Qualifier
- WC = Wild card
- LL = Lucky loser
- Alt = Alternate
- ITF = ITF entry
- PR = Protected ranking
- SR = Special ranking
- SE = Special exempt
- JE = Junior exempt
- JR = Junior Accelerator Programme entrant
- CO = College Accelerator Programme entrant
- NG = Next Gen Accelerator Program entrant
- w/o = Walkover
- r = Retired
- d = Defaulted

=== Finals ===
Semifinals
1	(United States) Bob Bryan (United States) Mike Bryan	7^{7}	6
(India) Rohan Bopanna (Romania) Florin Mergea	6^{5}	4
5	(France) Julien Benneteau (France) Édouard Roger-Vasselin	3	6	[10]
6	(Spain) Marcel Granollers (Spain) Marc López	6	4	[7]

Final
1	(United States) Bob Bryan (United States) Mike Bryan	6	7^{7}
5	(France) Julien Benneteau (France) Édouard Roger-Vasselin	3	6^{3}

=== Top half ===
First round
(Poland) Ł Kubot (Sweden) R Lindstedt	6	6
WC	(China) D Wu (China) Z Zhang	4	0
(Spain) R Bautista Agut (Argentina) L Mayer	6^{1}	4
(Colombia) JS Cabal (Colombia) R Farah	7^{7}	6
(Croatia) M Čilić (Mexico) S González	4	6	[7]
(Colombia) S Giraldo (United States) S Lipsky	6	3	[10]
(India) R Bopanna (Romania) F Mergea	6	0
(Italy) F Fognini (United States) R Ram	2	0^{r}

Second round
1	(United States) B Bryan (United States) M Bryan	6	7^{7}
(Poland) Ł Kubot (Sweden) R Lindstedt	3	6^{1}
(Colombia) JS Cabal (Colombia) R Farah	1	7^{7}	[10]
8	(Netherlands) J-J Rojer (Romania) H Tecău	6	6^{5}	[5]
4	(Croatia) I Dodig (Brazil) M Melo	6	3	[10]
(Colombia) S Giraldo (United States) S Lipsky	3	6	[6]
(India) R Bopanna (Romania) F Mergea	2	6	[11]
7	(Canada) V Pospisil (United States) J Sock	6	3	[9]

Quarterfinals
1	(United States) B Bryan (United States) M Bryan	3	6	[10]
(Colombia) JS Cabal (Colombia) R Farah	6	4	[7]
4	(Croatia) I Dodig (Brazil) M Melo	4	6	[7]
(India) R Bopanna (Romania) F Mergea	6	3	[10]

Semifinals
1	(United States) B Bryan (United States) M Bryan	7^{7}	6
(India) R Bopanna (Romania) F Mergea	6^{5}	4

=== Bottom half ===
First round
(Poland) M Matkowski (India) L Paes	6	7
WC	(China) M Gong (China) Z Li	3	5
Alt	(United Kingdom) J Murray (Australia) J Peers	4	5
(United States) E Butorac (South Africa) R Klaasen	6	7
(Uruguay) P Cuevas (Spain) D Marrero	6	6
(France) J Chardy (Pakistan) A-u-H Qureshi	4	4
(Spain) F López (Belarus) M Mirnyi	6^{6}	7	[8]
(Czech Republic) L Rosol (Russia) M Youzhny	7^{8}	5	[10]

Second round
5	(France) J Benneteau (France) É Roger-Vasselin	6	6
(Poland) M Matkowski (India) L Paes	2	4
(United States) E Butorac (South Africa) R Klaasen	3	4
3	(Austria) A Peya (Brazil) B Soares	6	6
6	(Spain) M Granollers (Spain) M López	6	6
(Uruguay) P Cuevas (Spain) D Marrero	0	1
(Czech Republic) L Rosol (Russia) M Youzhny	7^{8}	6
2	(Canada) D Nestor (Serbia) N Zimonjić	6^{6}	2

Quarterfinals
5	(France) J Benneteau (France) É Roger-Vasselin	3	6	[10]
3	(Austria) A Peya (Brazil) B Soares	6	3	[7]
6	(Spain) M Granollers (Spain) M López	6	6
(Czech Republic) L Rosol (Russia) M Youzhny	2	2

Semifinals
5	(France) J Benneteau (France) É Roger-Vasselin	3	6	[10]
6	(Spain) M Granollers (Spain) M López	6	4	[7]
