= 2015 Western & Southern Open – Men's singles =

Men's singles
- 2015 Western & Southern Open

Final
- Champion: (Switzerland) Roger Federer
- Runner-up: (Serbia) Novak Djokovic
- Score: 7–6^{(7–1)}, 6–3

Events
Singles	men	women
Doubles	men	women
- Western & Southern Open

Defending champion Roger Federer defeated Novak Djokovic in the final, 7–6^{(7–1)}, 6–3 to win the men's singles tennis title at the 2015 Cincinnati Masters. It was his seventh Cincinnati Masters title on his seventh final appearance, making him the second man to go undefeated in seven finals at the same Masters 1000 event (after Rafael Nadal at the Monte-Carlo Masters). For the second time in his career (after 2012), Federer did not lose a set or have his serve broken during the tournament. It marked the first time Federer defeated the world No. 1 and No. 2 players in consecutive matches en route to a title. It was Djokovic's fifth runner-up finish without winning the title; he would eventually do so in 2018.

== Seeds ==
The top eight seeds receive a bye into the second round.

1. (Serbia) Novak Djokovic (final)
2. (Switzerland) Roger Federer (champion)
3. (United Kingdom) Andy Murray (semifinals)
4. (Japan) ~~Kei Nishikori~~ (withdrew because of fatigue)
5. (Switzerland) Stan Wawrinka (quarterfinals)
6. (Czech Republic) Tomáš Berdych (quarterfinals)
7. (Croatia) Marin Čilić (third round)
8. (Spain) Rafael Nadal (third round)
9. (Canada) Milos Raonic (first round)
10. (France) Gilles Simon (first round)
11. (United States) John Isner (first round)
12. (France) Richard Gasquet (quarterfinals)
13. (Belgium) David Goffin (third round)
14. (France) Gaël Monfils (first round)
15. (South Africa) Kevin Anderson (third round)
16. (Bulgaria) Grigor Dimitrov (third round)

Click on the seed number of a player to go to their draw section.

== Draw ==
Key

- Q = Qualifier
- WC = Wild card
- LL = Lucky loser
- Alt = Alternate
- ITF = ITF entry
- PR = Protected ranking
- SR = Special ranking
- SE = Special exempt
- JE = Junior exempt
- JR = Junior Accelerator Programme entrant
- CO = College Accelerator Programme entrant
- NG = Next Gen Accelerator Program entrant
- w/o = Walkover
- r = Retired
- d = Defaulted

=== Finals ===
Quarterfinals
1	(Serbia) Novak Djokovic	6	6
5	(Switzerland) Stan Wawrinka	4	1
Q	(Ukraine) Alexandr Dolgopolov	6	6
6	(Czech Republic) Tomáš Berdych	4	2
12	(France) Richard Gasquet	6	1	4
3	(United Kingdom) Andy Murray	4	6	6
(Spain) Feliciano López	3	4
2	(Switzerland) Roger Federer	6	6

Semifinals
1	(Serbia) Novak Djokovic	4	7^{7}	6
Q	(Ukraine) Alexandr Dolgopolov	6	6^{5}	2
3	(United Kingdom) Andy Murray	4	6^{6}
2	(Switzerland) Roger Federer	6	7^{8}

Final
1	(Serbia) Novak Djokovic	6^{1}	3
2	(Switzerland) Roger Federer	7^{7}	6

=== Top half ===
==== Section 1 ====
First round
(Luxembourg) G Müller	6^{5}	6^{6}
LL	(France) B Paire	7^{7}	7^{8}
(France) J-W Tsonga	6	3	4
(Spain) F Verdasco	4	6	6
Q	(Chinese Taipei) Y-h Lu	7	3	4
13	(Belgium) D Goffin	5	6	6
10	(France) G Simon	4	7^{7}	3
(Croatia) I Karlović	6	6^{3}	6
(Austria) D Thiem	6^{5}	6	6^{4}
(Slovakia) M Kližan	7^{7}	3	7^{7}
(Croatia) B Ćorić	7	3	7^{7}
Q	(Germany) A Zverev	5	6	6^{5}

Second round
1	(Serbia) N Djokovic	7	6
LL	(France) B Paire	5	2
(Spain) F Verdasco	4	6^{4}
13	(Belgium) D Goffin	6	7^{7}
(Croatia) I Karlović	6	7^{7}
(Slovakia) M Kližan	3	6^{2}
(Croatia) B Ćorić	6	6^{3}	3
5	(Switzerland) S Wawrinka	3	7^{7}	6

Third round
1	(Serbia) N Djokovic	6	2	6
13	(Belgium) D Goffin	4	6	3
(Croatia) I Karlović	7^{7}	6^{5}	6^{5}
5	(Switzerland) S Wawrinka	6^{2}	7^{7}	7^{7}

Quarterfinals
1	(Serbia) N Djokovic	6	6
5	(Switzerland) S Wawrinka	4	1

==== Section 2 ====
First round
(Ukraine) S Stakhovsky	4	3
(Australia) B Tomic	6	6
WC	(United States) J Donaldson	7	6^{2}	6
Q	(France) N Mahut	5	7^{7}	2
(Poland) J Janowicz	6	7
14	(France) G Monfils	4	5
11	(United States) J Isner	3	6^{3}
(United States) S Querrey	6	7^{7}
(Spain) P Andújar	6	3	1
(Spain) T Robredo	3	6	6
(Brazil) T Bellucci	7^{7}	6
(Czech Republic) J Veselý	6^{5}	2

Second round
Q	(Ukraine) A Dolgopolov	6	6
(Australia) B Tomic	4	1
WC	(United States) J Donaldson	4	6^{4}
(Poland) J Janowicz	6	7^{7}
(United States) S Querrey	1	7	3
(Spain) T Robredo	6	5	6
(Brazil) T Bellucci	2	3
6	(Czech Republic) T Berdych	6	6

Third round
Q	(Ukraine) A Dolgopolov	6	3	6
(Poland) J Janowicz	3	6	4
(Spain) T Robredo	0	1
6	(Czech Republic) T Berdych	6	6

Quarterfinals
Q	(Ukraine) A Dolgopolov	6	6
6	(Czech Republic) T Berdych	4	2

=== Bottom half ===
==== Section 3 ====
First round
(Portugal) J Sousa	6	6^{5}	6
(Germany) P Kohlschreiber	2	7^{7}	2
(Italy) F Fognini	6	2	3
Q	(Australia) T Kokkinakis	4	6	6
(Australia) N Kyrgios	2	1
12	(France) R Gasquet	6	6
16	(Bulgaria) G Dimitrov	6	3	6
(Czech Republic) L Rosol	2	6	3
Q	(Canada) V Pospisil	6	6
Q	(United States) D Kudla	4	3
(Serbia) V Troicki	2	2
WC	(United States) M Fish	6	6

Second round
7	(Croatia) M Čilić	6	6
(Portugal) J Sousa	4	2
Q	(Australia) T Kokkinakis	6^{5}	2
12	(France) R Gasquet	7^{7}	6
16	(Bulgaria) G Dimitrov	7^{7}	7^{7}
Q	(Canada) V Pospisil	6^{4}	6^{5}
WC	(United States) M Fish	4	6^{1}
3	(United Kingdom) A Murray	6	7^{7}

Third round
7	(Croatia) M Čilić	5	3
12	(France) R Gasquet	7	6
16	(Bulgaria) G Dimitrov	6	6^{3}	5
3	(United Kingdom) A Murray	4	7^{7}	7

Quarterfinals
12	(France) R Gasquet	6	1	4
3	(United Kingdom) A Murray	4	6	6

==== Section 4 ====
First round
WC	(United States) R Ram	4	2
(France) J Chardy	6	6
(France) A Mannarino	3	3
(Italy) A Seppi	6	6
(Spain) F López	7^{7}	6
9	(Canada) M Raonic	6^{4}	4
15	(South Africa) K Anderson	7^{7}	3	6
(Argentina) L Mayer	6^{5}	6	1
WC	(United States) B Fratangelo	1	2
(United States) J Sock	6	6
(Spain) R Bautista Agut	6	6
(Uruguay) P Cuevas	3	4

Second round
8	(Spain) R Nadal	6	6
(France) J Chardy	3	4
(Italy) A Seppi	6^{6}	2
(Spain) F López	7^{8}	6
15	(South Africa) K Anderson	6	7^{9}
(United States) J Sock	3	6^{7}
(Spain) R Bautista Agut	4	4
2	(Switzerland) R Federer	6	6

Third round
8	(Spain) R Nadal	7	4	6^{3}
(Spain) F López	5	6	7^{7}
15	(South Africa) K Anderson	1	1
2	(Switzerland) R Federer	6	6

Quarterfinals
(Spain) F López	3	4
2	(Switzerland) R Federer	6	6

== Qualifying ==
=== Seeds ===
1. (France) Benoît Paire (qualifying competition, lucky loser)
2. (United States) Steve Johnson (qualifying competition)
3. (Canada) Vasek Pospisil (qualified)
4. (Kazakhstan) Mikhail Kukushkin (first round)
5. (Ukraine) Sergiy Stakhovsky (moved to main draw)
6. (Colombia) Santiago Giraldo (qualifying competition)
7. (Germany) Benjamin Becker (first round)
8. (France) Nicolas Mahut (qualified)
9. (Ukraine) Alexandr Dolgopolov (qualified)
10. (Uzbekistan) Denis Istomin (qualifying competition)
11. (South Korea) Chung Hyeon (qualifying competition)
12. (Australia) Thanasi Kokkinakis (qualified)
13. (United States) Denis Kudla (qualified)
14. (Chinese Taipei) Lu Yen-hsun (qualified)
15. (Turkey) Marsel İlhan (qualifying competition)

=== Qualifiers ===
1. (United States) Denis Kudla
2. (France) Nicolas Mahut
3. (Canada) Vasek Pospisil
4. (Chinese Taipei) Lu Yen-hsun
5. (Australia) Thanasi Kokkinakis
6. (Ukraine) Alexandr Dolgopolov
7. (Germany) Alexander Zverev

=== Lucky loser ===
1. (France) Benoît Paire

=== Qualifying draw ===
==== First qualifier ====
First round
1	(France) Benoît Paire	6	6
(Italy) Marco Cecchinato	1	1
WC	(United States) Tommy Paul	2	6	0
13	(United States) Denis Kudla	6	0	6

Qualifying competition
1	(France) Benoît Paire	4	4
13	(United States) Denis Kudla	6	6

==== Second qualifier ====
First round
2	(United States) Steve Johnson	7	6
(Australia) James Duckworth	5	4
WC	(United States) Frances Tiafoe	3	2
8	(France) Nicolas Mahut	6	6

Qualifying competition
2	(United States) Steve Johnson	2	4
8	(France) Nicolas Mahut	6	6

==== Third qualifier ====
First round
3	(Canada) Vasek Pospisil	6	6
(Japan) Tatsuma Ito	3	2
(Croatia) Ivan Dodig	6	4	1
11	(South Korea) Chung Hyeon	3	6	6

Qualifying competition
3	(Canada) Vasek Pospisil	6^{4}	6	6
11	(South Korea) Chung Hyeon	7^{7}	0	3

==== Fourth qualifier ====
First round
4	(Kazakhstan) Mikhail Kukushkin	6	4	5
(Russia) Mikhail Youzhny	0	6	7
WC	(United States) Stefan Kozlov	4	3
14	(Chinese Taipei) Lu Yen-hsun	6	6

Qualifying competition
(Russia) Mikhail Youzhny	6	2	4
14	(Chinese Taipei) Lu Yen-hsun	2	6	6

==== Fifth qualifier ====
First round
15	(Turkey) Marsel İlhan	4	6	7^{7}
(Georgia (country)) Nikoloz Basilashvili	6	4	6^{2}
WC	(United States) Ryan Harrison	5	6	6^{2}
12	(Australia) Thanasi Kokkinakis	7	3	7^{7}

Qualifying competition
15	(Turkey) Marsel İlhan	4	6	4
12	(Australia) Thanasi Kokkinakis	6	2	6

==== Sixth qualifier ====
First round
6	(Colombia) Santiago Giraldo	6	6
(United States) Tim Smyczek	4	4
Alt	(United Kingdom) James Ward	4	4
9	(Ukraine) Alexandr Dolgopolov	6	6

Qualifying competition
6	(Colombia) Santiago Giraldo	3	6	4
9	(Ukraine) Alexandr Dolgopolov	6	3	6

==== Seventh qualifier ====
First round
7	(Germany) Benjamin Becker	4	2
(Germany) Alexander Zverev	6	6
Alt	(Slovenia) Blaž Rola	6	6^{7}	4
10	(Uzbekistan) Denis Istomin	1	7^{9}	6

Qualifying competition
(Germany) Alexander Zverev	6	3	6
10	(Uzbekistan) Denis Istomin	2	6	3
