= 2015 Western & Southern Open – Women's singles =

Women's singles
- 2015 Western & Southern Open

Final
- Champion: (United States) Serena Williams
- Runner-up: (Romania) Simona Halep
- Score: 6–3, 7–6^{(7–5)}

Details
- Draw: 56
- Seeds: 16

Events
Singles	men	women
Doubles	men	women
- Western & Southern Open

Defending champion Serena Williams defeated Simona Halep in the final, 6–3, 7–6^{(7–5)} to win the women's singles tennis title at the 2015 Cincinnati Masters.

== Seeds ==
The top eight seeds received a bye into the second round.

1. (United States) Serena Williams (champion)
2. (Russia) Maria Sharapova (withdrew because of a right leg injury)
3. (Romania) Simona Halep (final)
4. (Czech Republic) Petra Kvitová (second round)
5. (Denmark) Caroline Wozniacki (second round)
6. (Serbia) Ana Ivanovic (quarterfinals)
7. (Czech Republic) Lucie Šafářová (quarterfinals)
8. (Czech Republic) Karolína Plíšková (third round)
9. (Spain) Garbiñe Muguruza (first round)
10. (Spain) Carla Suárez Navarro (first round)
11. (Germany) Angelique Kerber (first round)
12. (Switzerland) Timea Bacsinszky (first round)
13. (Poland) Agnieszka Radwańska (first round)
14. (Ukraine) Elina Svitolina (semifinals)
15. (Germany) Andrea Petkovic (third round)
16. (Italy) Sara Errani (first round)

Click on the seed number of a player to go to their draw section.

== Draw ==
Key

- Q = Qualifier
- WC = Wild card
- LL = Lucky loser
- Alt = Alternate
- ITF = ITF entry
- PR = Protected ranking
- SR = Special ranking
- SE = Special exempt
- JE = Junior exempt
- JR = Junior Accelerator Programme entrant
- CO = College Accelerator Programme entrant
- NG = Next Gen Accelerator Program entrant
- w/o = Walkover
- r = Retired
- d = Defaulted

=== Finals ===
Quarterfinals
1	(United States) Serena Williams	3	6	6
6	(Serbia) Ana Ivanovic	6	4	2
14	(Ukraine) Elina Svitolina	6	2	6
7	(Czech Republic) Lucie Šafářová	4	6	0
(Russia) Anastasia Pavlyuchenkova	6^{3}	2
3	(Romania) Simona Halep	7^{7}	6
(Serbia) Jelena Janković	6	6
Q	(Slovakia) Anna Karolína Schmiedlová	4	2

Semifinals
1	(United States) Serena Williams	6	6
14	(Ukraine) Elina Svitolina	4	3
3	(Romania) Simona Halep	6	6
(Serbia) Jelena Janković	1	2

Final
1	(United States) Serena Williams	6	7^{7}
3	(Romania) Simona Halep	3	6^{5}

=== Top half ===
==== Section 1 ====
First round
Q	(Czech Republic) L Hradecká	5	6	1
(Bulgaria) T Pironkova	7	3	6
(Italy) K Knapp	7	6
Q	(Croatia) A Konjuh	5	1
(Russia) D Gavrilova	6	4	6
16	(Italy) S Errani	1	6	2
10	(Spain) C Suárez Navarro	1	2
(United States) S Stephens	6	6
Q	(Germany) M Barthel	2	6	7^{7}
Q	(Australia) C Dellacqua	6	3	6^{4}
(Kazakhstan) Z Diyas	6^{6}	4
(United States) V Williams	7^{8}	6

Second round
1	(United States) S Williams	7	6
(Bulgaria) T Pironkova	5	3
(Italy) K Knapp	6	6
(Russia) D Gavrilova	4	1
(United States) S Stephens	3	7^{7}	6
Q	(Germany) M Barthel	6	6^{1}	2
(United States) V Williams
6	(Serbia) A Ivanovic	w/o

Third round
1	(United States) S Williams	6	6
(Italy) K Knapp	0	2
(United States) S Stephens	6	4	1
6	(Serbia) A Ivanovic	2	6	6

Quarterfinals
1	(United States) S Williams	3	6	6
6	(Serbia) A Ivanovic	6	4	2

==== Section 2 ====
First round
(France) C Garcia	3	6	6
(Germany) S Lisicki	6	3	4
Q	(Ukraine) K Bondarenko	6^{2}	6^{5}
(Canada) E Bouchard	7^{7}	7^{7}
WC	(United States) A Riske	2	6	0
14	(Ukraine) E Svitolina	6	4	6
11	(Germany) A Kerber	5	3
(Switzerland) B Bencic	7	6
(Italy) F Pennetta	7	6
PR	(Slovakia) D Cibulková	5	2
WC	(United States) C Vandeweghe	6	6
Q	(Kazakhstan) Y Putintseva	3	2

Second round
4	(Czech Republic) P Kvitová	5	6	2
(France) C Garcia	7	4	6
(Canada) E Bouchard	6^{6}	5
14	(Ukraine) E Svitolina	7^{8}	7
(Switzerland) B Bencic	6	6
(Italy) F Pennetta	1	4
WC	(United States) C Vandeweghe	4	5
7	(Czech Republic) L Šafářová	6	7

Third round
(France) C Garcia	0	3
14	(Ukraine) E Svitolina	6	6
(Switzerland) B Bencic	2	0^{r}
7	(Czech Republic) L Šafářová	6	0

Quarterfinals
14	(Ukraine) E Svitolina	6	2	6
7	(Czech Republic) L Šafářová	4	6	0

=== Bottom half ===
==== Section 3 ====
First round
(Belarus) V Azarenka	6	6
Q	(United States) L Davis	1	2
(Russia) A Pavlyuchenkova	6	0	6
(Italy) R Vinci	3	6	2
Q	(Kazakhstan) Y Shvedova	6	7^{7}
9	(Spain) G Muguruza	4	6^{0}
15	(Germany) A Petkovic	6	6
Q	(Germany) J Görges	4	2
(Italy) C Giorgi	5	6	6
Q	(United States) C McHale	7	3	2
(France) K Mladenovic	6	6
WC	(Slovakia) D Hantuchová	2	1

Second round
5	(Denmark) C Wozniacki	0	4
(Belarus) V Azarenka	6	6
(Russia) A Pavlyuchenkova	2	6	6
Q	(Kazakhstan) Y Shvedova	6	3	2
15	(Germany) A Petkovic	5	6	6
(Italy) C Giorgi	7	3	3
(France) K Mladenovic	5	7	4
3	(Romania) S Halep	7	5	6

Third round
(Belarus) V Azarenka	6	0^{r}
(Russia) A Pavlyuchenkova	1	3
15	(Germany) A Petkovic	6	4	2
3	(Romania) S Halep	4	6	6

Quarterfinals
(Russia) A Pavlyuchenkova	6^{3}	2
3	(Romania) S Halep	7^{7}	6

==== Section 4 ====
First round
(Australia) S Stosur	6^{6}	6	5
Q	(Hungary) T Babos	7^{8}	4	7
(United States) M Brengle	6	4	2
(Serbia) J Janković	4	6	6
(United States) M Keys	6	6
12	(Switzerland) T Bacsinszky	4	3
13	(Poland) A Radwańska	6	3	1
Q	(Slovakia) AK Schmiedlová	4	6	6
(Romania) I-C Begu	6	6
(France) A Cornet	4	4
(Czech Republic) B Strýcová	6	5	6^{6}
(United States) V Lepchenko	2	7	7^{8}

Second round
8	(Czech Republic) Ka Plíšková	6	7
Q	(Hungary) T Babos	4	5
(Serbia) J Janković	7^{7}	6
(United States) M Keys	6^{4}	4
Q	(Slovakia) AK Schmiedlová	6	6
(Romania) I-C Begu	1	3
(United States) V Lepchenko	7	6
LL	(Croatia) M Lučić-Baroni	5	4

Third round
8	(Czech Republic) Ka Plíšková	2	6	5
(Serbia) J Janković	6	3	7
Q	(Slovakia) AK Schmiedlová	6	3	6
(United States) V Lepchenko	3	6	4

Quarterfinals
(Serbia) J Janković	6	6
Q	(Slovakia) AK Schmiedlová	4	2

== Qualifying ==
=== Seeds ===
1. (Romania) Monica Niculescu (first round)
2. (Slovakia) Anna Karolína Schmiedlová (qualified)
3. (Sweden) Johanna Larsson (first round)
4. (Slovakia) Magdaléna Rybáriková (first round)
5. (Romania) Alexandra Dulgheru (first round)
6. (Croatia) Mirjana Lučić-Baroni (qualifying competition, lucky loser)
7. (Belgium) Alison Van Uytvanck (withdrew)
8. (Germany) Annika Beck (first round)
9. (Germany) Carina Witthöft (first round)
10. (Czech Republic) Lucie Hradecká (qualified)
11. (United States) Christina McHale (qualified)
12. (Germany) Mona Barthel (qualified)
13. (Germany) Julia Görges (qualified)
14. (Australia) Casey Dellacqua (qualified)
15. (Serbia) Aleksandra Krunić (first round)
16. (Germany) Tatjana Maria (qualifying competition)
17. (United Kingdom) Heather Watson (first round)
18. (Slovenia) Polona Hercog (qualifying competition)
19. (Spain) Lara Arruabarrena (first round)
20. (Japan) Kurumi Nara (qualifying competition, retired)
21. (Romania) Andreea Mitu (first round)
22. (United States) Irina Falconi (qualifying competition)
23. (Australia) Jarmila Gajdošová (first round)
24. (Belarus) Olga Govortsova (qualifying competition)
25. (Kazakhstan) Yulia Putintseva (qualified)

=== Qualifiers ===
1. (Hungary) Tímea Babos
2. (Slovakia) Anna Karolína Schmiedlová
3. (Croatia) Ana Konjuh
4. (Germany) Julia Görges
5. (Ukraine) Kateryna Bondarenko
6. (Australia) Casey Dellacqua
7. (Kazakhstan) Yulia Putintseva
8. (United States) Lauren Davis
9. (Kazakhstan) Yaroslava Shvedova
10. (Czech Republic) Lucie Hradecká
11. (United States) Christina McHale
12. (Germany) Mona Barthel

=== Lucky loser ===
1. (Croatia) Mirjana Lučić-Baroni

=== Draw ===
==== First qualifier ====
First round
1	(Romania) Monica Niculescu	6	6^{7}	6^{9}
(Belarus) Aliaksandra Sasnovich	3	7^{9}	7^{11}
(Hungary) Tímea Babos	6	1	6
17	(United Kingdom) Heather Watson	2	6	3

Qualifying competition
(Belarus) Aliaksandra Sasnovich	6^{2}	4
(Hungary) Tímea Babos	7^{7}	6

==== Second qualifier ====
First round
2	(Slovakia) Anna Karolína Schmiedlová	1	6	6
WC	(United States) Taylor Townsend	6	0	2
WC	(United States) Sachia Vickery	6^{3}	6^{0}
24	(Belarus) Olga Govortsova	7^{7}	7^{7}

Qualifying competition
2	(Slovakia) Anna Karolína Schmiedlová	6	6
24	(Belarus) Olga Govortsova	4	2

==== Third qualifier ====
First round
3	(Sweden) Johanna Larsson	0	6^{2}
(Croatia) Ana Konjuh	6	7^{7}
(Japan) Misaki Doi	6	6
15	(Serbia) Aleksandra Krunić	2	0

Qualifying competition
(Croatia) Ana Konjuh	5	7^{7}	6
(Japan) Misaki Doi	7	6^{3}	3

==== Fourth qualifier ====
First round
4	(Slovakia) Magdaléna Rybáriková	7	4	3
(Bulgaria) Sesil Karatantcheva	5	6	6
(Poland) Urszula Radwańska	4	6	5
13	(Germany) Julia Görges	6	4	7

Qualifying competition
(Bulgaria) Sesil Karatantcheva	4	6^{7}
13	(Germany) Julia Görges	6	7^{9}

==== Fifth qualifier ====
First round
5	(Romania) Alexandra Dulgheru	7^{7}	1	3
(Slovakia) Jana Čepelová	6^{5}	6	6
(Ukraine) Kateryna Bondarenko	6	6
19	(Spain) Lara Arruabarrena	1	4

Qualifying competition
(Slovakia) Jana Čepelová	3	0
(Ukraine) Kateryna Bondarenko	6	6

==== Sixth qualifier ====
First round
6	(Croatia) Mirjana Lučić-Baroni	7^{9}	6
(Chinese Taipei) Hsieh Su-wei	6^{7}	3
WC	(United States) Alexa Glatch	6^{4}	2
14	(Australia) Casey Dellacqua	7^{7}	6

Qualifying competition
6	(Croatia) Mirjana Lučić-Baroni	4	6	3
14	(Australia) Casey Dellacqua	6	2	6

==== Seventh qualifier ====
First round
25	(Kazakhstan) Yulia Putintseva	6	6
WC	(United States) Louisa Chirico	0	4
(New Zealand) Marina Erakovic	4	3
20	(Japan) Kurumi Nara	6	6

Qualifying competition
25	(Kazakhstan) Yulia Putintseva	7	1
20	(Japan) Kurumi Nara	5	0^{r}

==== Eighth qualifier ====
First round
8	(Germany) Annika Beck	2	4
WC	(United States) Nicole Gibbs	6	6
(United States) Lauren Davis	5	6	6
21	(Romania) Andreea Mitu	7	2	3

Qualifying competition
WC	(United States) Nicole Gibbs	6^{1}	4
(United States) Lauren Davis	7^{7}	6

==== Ninth qualifier ====
First round
9	(Germany) Carina Witthöft	4	4
(Colombia) Mariana Duque Mariño	6	6
(Kazakhstan) Yaroslava Shvedova	6	7
23	(Australia) Jarmila Gajdošová	4	5

Qualifying competition
(Colombia) Mariana Duque Mariño	1	4
(Kazakhstan) Yaroslava Shvedova	6	6

==== Tenth qualifier ====
First round
10	(Czech Republic) Lucie Hradecká	6	6
(Puerto Rico) Monica Puig	4	4
(Russia) Evgeniya Rodina	4	2
16	(Germany) Tatjana Maria	6	6

Qualifying competition
10	(Czech Republic) Lucie Hradecká	6	6
16	(Germany) Tatjana Maria	4	4

==== Eleventh qualifier ====
First round
11	(United States) Christina McHale	6^{5}	6	6
(Czech Republic) Kristýna Plíšková	7^{7}	4	1
Alt	(Austria) Tamira Paszek	3	3
18	(Slovenia) Polona Hercog	6	6

Qualifying competition
11	(United States) Christina McHale	7^{11}	2	6
18	(Slovenia) Polona Hercog	6^{9}	6	4

==== Twelfth qualifier ====
First round
12	(Germany) Mona Barthel	6	6
(Russia) Elena Vesnina	1	2
WC	(United States) Jennifer Brady	1	3
22	(United States) Irina Falconi	6	6

Qualifying competition
12	(Germany) Mona Barthel	6	6
22	(United States) Irina Falconi	4	1
