= 2025 Open Occitanie =

- Date: 27 January–2 February 2025
- Edition: 38th
- Draw: 28S / 16D
- Surface: Hard (Indoor)
- Location: Montpellier, France
- Venue: Sud de France Arena

Champions

Singles
- (Canada) Félix Auger-Aliassime

Doubles
- (Netherlands) Robin Haase / (Netherlands) Botic van de Zandschulp
← 2024 ·	Open Sud de France	· 2026 →

The 2025 Open Occitanie was a men's tennis tournament played on indoor hardcourts. It was the 38th edition of the event (known formerly as the Open Sud de France), and part of the ATP Tour 250 series of the 2025 ATP Tour. It took place at the Arena Montpellier in Montpellier, France, from 27 January until 2 February 2025.

== Champions ==
=== Singles ===
- (Canada) Félix Auger-Aliassime def. (United States) Aleksandar Kovacevic, 6–2, 6–7^{(7–9)}, 7–6^{(7–2)}

=== Doubles ===
- (Netherlands) Robin Haase / (Netherlands) Botic van de Zandschulp def. (Netherlands) Tallon Griekspoor / (Netherlands) Bart Stevens, 6–7^{(7–9)}, 6–3, [10–5]

== Singles main draw entrants ==
=== Seeds ===
Country	Player	Rank^{1}	Seed
	Andrey Rublev	9	1
CAN	Félix Auger-Aliassime	23	2
ITA	Flavio Cobolli	32	3
KAZ	Alexander Bublik	37	4
NED	Tallon Griekspoor	40	5
BEL	David Goffin	54	6
FRA	Arthur Rinderknech	61	7
CHN	Bu Yunchaokete	67	8

- ^{1} Rankings are as of 13 January 2025.

=== Other entrants ===
The following players received wildcards into the singles main draw :

- (France) Grégoire Barrère
- (France) Quentin Halys
- Andrey Rublev
- (Switzerland) Stan Wawrinka

The following players received entry from the qualifying draw:

- (Georgia (country)) Nikoloz Basilashvili
- Alibek Kachmazov
- (United States) Aleksandar Kovacevic
- (France) Constant Lestienne

=== Withdrawals ===
- (Spain) Roberto Carballés Baena → replaced by (Croatia) Borna Ćorić
- (United States) Sebastian Korda → replaced by (France) Richard Gasquet
- (Spain) Pedro Martínez → replaced by (United States) Christopher Eubanks
- (France) Gaël Monfils → replaced by (Germany) Daniel Altmaier
- (France) Giovanni Mpetshi Perricard → replaced by (France) Harold Mayot
- (France) Alexandre Müller → replaced by (France) Lucas Pouille
- (Spain) Jaume Munar → replaced by (Netherlands) Jesper de Jong
- (Italy) Lorenzo Sonego → replaced by (Netherlands) Botic van de Zandschulp
- (Australia) Aleksandar Vukic → replaced by (Kazakhstan) Mikhail Kukushkin

== Doubles main draw entrants ==
=== Seeds ===
Country	Player	Country	Player	Rank^{1}	Seed
FRA	Sadio Doumbia	FRA	Fabien Reboul	64	1
GBR	Jamie Murray	FRA	Édouard Roger-Vasselin	66	2
IND	Yuki Bhambri	CRO	Ivan Dodig	73	3
NED	Sander Arends	GBR	Luke Johnson	105	4

- ^{1} Rankings are as of 13 January 2025.

=== Other entrants ===
The following pairs received wildcards into the doubles main draw:

- (France) Arthur Cazaux / (Switzerland) Stan Wawrinka
- (France) Richard Gasquet / (France) Lucas Pouille

=== Withdrawals ===
- (India) Sriram Balaji / (Mexico) Miguel Ángel Reyes-Varela → replaced by (Italy) Flavio Cobolli / (France) Jonathan Eysseric
- (India) Yuki Bhambri / (France) Albano Olivetti → replaced by (India) Yuki Bhambri / (Croatia) Ivan Dodig
- (United Kingdom) Julian Cash / (United Kingdom) Lloyd Glasspool → replaced by (Netherlands) Tallon Griekspoor / (Netherlands) Bart Stevens
- (Croatia) Ivan Dodig / (Tunisia) Skander Mansouri → replaced by (Germany) Jakob Schnaitter / (Germany) Mark Wallner
- (Mexico) Santiago González / (Netherlands) Jean-Julien Rojer → replaced by (India) Jeevan Nedunchezhiyan / (India) Vijay Sundar Prashanth
- (Netherlands) Robin Haase / (Netherlands) Sem Verbeek → replaced by (Netherlands) Robin Haase / (Netherlands) Botic van de Zandschulp
- (United States) Vasil Kirkov / (United States) Sebastian Korda → replaced by (United States) Christian Harrison / (United States) Evan King
