= 1999 Grand Prix de Tennis de Lyon – Doubles =

Doubles
- 1999 Grand Prix de Tennis de Lyon

Final
- Champions: (South Africa) Piet Norval (Zimbabwe) Kevin Ullyett
- Runners-up: (South Africa) Wayne Ferreira (Australia) Sandon Stolle
- Score: 4–6, 7–6^{(7–5)}, 7–6^{(7–4)}

Details
- Draw: 16
- Seeds: 4

Events
Singles	Doubles
← 1998 ·	Grand Prix de Tennis de Lyon	· 2000 →

Olivier Delaître and Fabrice Santoro were the defending champions, but lost in the quarterfinals this year.

Piet Norval and Kevin Ullyett won in the final 4–6, 7–6^{(7–5)}, 7–6^{(7–4)}, against Wayne Ferreira and Sandon Stolle.

== Seeds ==
1. N/A
2. (South Africa) David Adams / (United States) Jeff Tarango (quarterfinals)
3. (France) Olivier Delaître / (France) Fabrice Santoro (quarterfinals)
4. (South Africa) Wayne Ferreira / (Australia) Sandon Stolle (final)

== Draw ==
=== Key ===
- Q = Qualifier
- WC = Wild card
- LL = Lucky loser
- Alt = Alternate
- SE = Special exempt
- PR = Protected ranking
- ITF = ITF entry
- JE = Junior exempt
- w/o = Walkover
- r = Retired
- d = Defaulted
- SR = Special ranking

=== Draw ===
First round
LL	(United States) M Keil (United States) C Woodruff	1	7^{7}	1
WC	(France) N Escudé (France) G Raoux	6	6^{2}	6
Q	(South Africa) M Barnard (Netherlands) S Schalken	4	3
(South Africa) P Norval (Zimbabwe) K Ullyett	6	6
3	(France) O Delaître (France) F Santoro	6	4	6
(South Africa) C Haggard (Sweden) P Nyborg	3	6	0
(The Bahamas) M Knowles (United States) R Reneberg	2	4
(Australia) M Kratzmann (North Macedonia) A Kitinov	6	6
(Australia) A Florent (Australia) D Macpherson	6	6
WC	(Brazil) G Kuerten (Ecuador) N Lapentti	3	4
(South Africa) R Koenig (Russia) A Olhovskiy	6^{2}	4
4	(South Africa) W Ferreira (Australia) S Stolle	7^{7}	6
(Australia) P Tramacchi (Sweden) M Tillström	7^{7}	6
LL	(France) J Boutter (France) J Hanquez	6^{3}	4
WC	(France) A Clément (France) S Grosjean	6	4	2
2	(South Africa) D Adams (United States) J Tarango	3	6	6

Quarterfinals
WC	(France) N Escudé (France) G Raoux	3	5
(South Africa) P Norval (Zimbabwe) K Ullyett	6	7
3	(France) O Delaître (France) F Santoro	7	3	6^{5}
(Australia) M Kratzmann (North Macedonia) A Kitinov	5	6	7^{7}
(Australia) A Florent (Australia) D Macpherson	6	5	3
4	(South Africa) W Ferreira (Australia) S Stolle	4	7	6
(Australia) P Tramacchi (Sweden) M Tillström	6	6
2	(South Africa) D Adams (United States) J Tarango	4	3

Semifinals
(South Africa) P Norval (Zimbabwe) K Ullyett	7	3	7^{7}
(Australia) M Kratzmann (North Macedonia) A Kitinov	5	6	6^{4}
4	(South Africa) W Ferreira (Australia) S Stolle	7^{7}	6
(Australia) P Tramacchi (Sweden) M Tillström	6^{5}	2

Final
(South Africa) P Norval (Zimbabwe) K Ullyett	4	7^{7}	7^{7}
4	(South Africa) W Ferreira (Australia) S Stolle	6	6^{5}	6^{4}
