= 1997 Grand Prix de Tennis de Lyon =

- Date: 13–20 October 1997
- Edition: 11th
- Category: World Series
- Draw: 32S / 16D
- Prize money: $725,000
- Surface: Carpet / indoor
- Location: Lyon, France
- Venue: Palais des Sports de Gerland

Champions

Singles
- (France) Fabrice Santoro

Doubles
- (South Africa) Ellis Ferreira / (United States) Patrick Galbraith
← 1996 ·	Grand Prix de Tennis de Lyon	· 1998 →

The 1997 Grand Prix de Tennis de Lyon was a men's tennis tournament played on indoor carpet courts at the Palais des Sports de Gerland in Lyon, France, and was part of the World Series of the 1997 ATP Tour. It was the 11th edition of the tournament and took place from 13 October until 20 October 1997. Unseeded Fabrice Santoro won the singles title.

== Finals ==
=== Singles ===
(France) Fabrice Santoro defeated (Germany) Tommy Haas 6–4, 6–4

- It was Santoro's only title of the year and the 2nd of his career.

=== Doubles ===
(South Africa) Ellis Ferreira / (United States) Patrick Galbraith defeated (France) Olivier Delaître / (France) Fabrice Santoro 3–6, 6–2, 6–4

- It was Ferreira's 5th title of the year and the 8th of his career. It was Galbraith's 5th title of the year and the 33rd of his career.
