= 2025 Open Occitanie – Doubles =

Doubles
- 2025 Open Occitanie

Final
- Champions: (Netherlands) Robin Haase (Netherlands) Botic van de Zandschulp
- Runners-up: (Netherlands) Tallon Griekspoor (Netherlands) Bart Stevens
- Score: 6–7^{(7–9)}, 6–3, [10–5]

Details
- Draw: 16
- Seeds: 4

Events
Singles	Doubles
← 2024 ·	Open Sud de France	· 2026 →

Robin Haase and Botic van de Zandschulp won the doubles title at the 2025 Open Occitanie, defeating Tallon Griekspoor and Bart Stevens in an all-Dutch final, 6–7^{(7–9)}, 6–3, [10–5].

Sadio Doumbia and Fabien Reboul were the defending champions, but lost in the quarterfinals to Haase and van de Zandschulp.

== Seeds ==
1. (France) Sadio Doumbia / (France) Fabien Reboul (quarterfinals)
2. (United Kingdom) Jamie Murray / (France) Édouard Roger-Vasselin (first round)
3. (India) Yuki Bhambri / (Croatia) Ivan Dodig (quarterfinals)
4. (Netherlands) Sander Arends / (United Kingdom) Luke Johnson (semifinals)

== Draw ==
=== Key ===
- Q = Qualifier
- WC = Wild card
- LL = Lucky loser
- Alt = Alternate
- SE = Special exempt
- PR = Protected ranking
- ITF = ITF entry
- JE = Junior exempt
- w/o = Walkover
- r = Retired
- d = Defaulted
- SR = Special ranking

=== Draw ===
First round
1	(France) S Doumbia (France) F Reboul	6^{4}	6	[11]
(France) T Arribagé (Netherlands) M Middelkoop	7^{7}	4	[9]
(Netherlands) R Haase (Netherlands) B van de Zandschulp	6^{6}	6	[11]
WC	(France) R Gasquet (France) L Pouille	7^{8}	3	[9]
3	(India) Y Bhambri (Croatia) I Dodig	7	3	[10]
(Germany) J Schnaitter (Germany) M Wallner	5	6	[8]
(United States) C Harrison (United States) E King	6^{5}	4
(France) M Guinard (France) G Jacq	7^{7}	6
(Italy) F Cobolli (France) J Eysseric	6	7
(India) J Nedunchezhiyan (India) VS Prashanth	1	5
(Czech Republic) P Nouza (Czech Republic) P Rikl	6^{1}	1^{r}
4	(Netherlands) S Arends (United Kingdom) L Johnson	7^{7}	3
WC	(France) A Cazaux (Switzerland) S Wawrinka	7	4	[5]
(Netherlands) T Griekspoor (Netherlands) B Stevens	5	6	[10]
(Germany) C Frantzen (Germany) H Jebens	7	2	[10]
2	(United Kingdom) J Murray (France) É Roger-Vasselin	5	6	[5]

Quarterfinals
1	(France) S Doumbia (France) F Reboul	6^{4}	4
(Netherlands) R Haase (Netherlands) B van de Zandschulp	7^{7}	6
3	(India) Y Bhambri (Croatia) I Dodig	4	5
(France) M Guinard (France) G Jacq	6	7
(Italy) F Cobolli (France) J Eysseric	2	2
4	(Netherlands) S Arends (United Kingdom) L Johnson	6	6
(Netherlands) T Griekspoor (Netherlands) B Stevens	6	6
(Germany) C Frantzen (Germany) H Jebens	2	3

Semifinals
(Netherlands) R Haase (Netherlands) B van de Zandschulp	6	6
(France) M Guinard (France) G Jacq	4	4
4	(Netherlands) S Arends (United Kingdom) L Johnson	2	7^{7}	[6]
(Netherlands) T Griekspoor (Netherlands) B Stevens	6	6^{5}	[10]

Final
(Netherlands) R Haase (Netherlands) B van de Zandschulp	6^{7}	6	[10]
(Netherlands) T Griekspoor (Netherlands) B Stevens	7^{9}	3	[5]
