= 1998 Grand Prix de Tennis de Lyon =

- Date: 19–26 October 1998
- Edition: 12th
- Category: International Series
- Draw: 32S / 16D
- Prize money: $725,000
- Surface: Carpet / indoor
- Location: Lyon, France]
- Venue: Palais des Sports de Gerland

Champions

Singles
- (Spain) Àlex Corretja

Doubles
- (France) Olivier Delaître / (France) Fabrice Santoro
← 1997 ·	Grand Prix de Tennis de Lyon	· 1999 →

The 1998 Grand Prix de Tennis de Lyon was a men's tennis tournament played on indoor carpet courts at the Palais des Sports de Gerland in Lyon, France, and was part of the International Series of the 1998 ATP Tour. It was the 12th edition of the tournament and ran from 19 October until 26 October 1998. Fourth-seeded Àlex Corretja won the singles title.

== Finals ==
=== Singles ===
(Spain) Àlex Corretja defeated (Germany) Tommy Haas 2–6, 7–6^{(8–6)}, 6–1

- It was Corretja's 4th title of the year and the 10th of his career.

=== Doubles ===
(France) Olivier Delaître / (France) Fabrice Santoro defeated (Spain) Tomás Carbonell / (Spain) Francisco Roig 6–2, 6–2

- It was Delaître's 4th title of the year and the 12th of his career. It was Santoro's 4th title of the year and the 6th of his career.
