= 1998 Grand Prix de Tennis de Lyon – Singles =

Singles
- 1998 Grand Prix de Tennis de Lyon

Final
- Champion: (Spain) Àlex Corretja
- Runner-up: (Germany) Tommy Haas
- Score: 2–6, 7–6^{(8–6)}, 6–1

Events
Singles	Doubles
← 1997 ·	Grand Prix de Tennis de Lyon	· 1999 →

Fabrice Santoro was the defending champion, but lost in the second round this year.

Àlex Corretja won the tournament, beating Tommy Haas 2–6, 7–6^{(8–6)}, 6–1 in the final.

== Seeds ==
1. (United States) Pete Sampras (quarterfinals, withdrew)
2. (Australia) Patrick Rafter (quarterfinals)
3. (Chile) Marcelo Ríos (semifinals, retired)
4. (Spain) Àlex Corretja (champion)
5. (Netherlands) Jan Siemerink (first round)
6. (Spain) Albert Costa (first round)
7. (France) Cédric Pioline (second round)
8. (France) Fabrice Santoro (second round)

== Draw ==
=== Key ===
- Q = Qualifier
- WC = Wild card
- LL = Lucky loser
- Alt = Alternate
- SE = Special exempt
- PR = Protected ranking
- ITF = ITF entry
- JE = Junior exempt
- w/o = Walkover
- r = Retired
- d = Defaulted
- SR = Special ranking

=== Finals ===
Semifinals
(Germany) Tommy Haas	6	1
3	(Chile) Marcelo Ríos	2	0^{r}
4	(Spain) Àlex Corretja	6	6
(South Africa) Wayne Ferreira	3	2

Final
(Germany) Tommy Haas	6	6^{6}	1
4	(Spain) Àlex Corretja	2	7^{8}	6

=== Top half ===
First round
1	(United States) P Sampras	6	1	6
(United States) T Martin	4	6	4
(Australia) T Woodbridge	6	6^{4}	7^{7}
(Belgium) J Van Herck	4	7^{7}	6^{0}
(France) A Clément	2	7^{9}	4
(Germany) T Haas	6	6^{7}	6
Q	(France) S Huet	3	3
8	(France) F Santoro	6	6
3	(Chile) M Ríos	6	6
(United States) J Tarango	3	3
(Costa Rica) JA Marín	0	4
(France) N Escudé	6	6
(United States) V Spadea	6^{5}	7^{7}	2
Q	(United States) R Reneberg	7^{7}	6^{4}	6
WC	(France) A Di Pasquale	7	6
WC/6	(Spain) A Costa	5	3

Second round
1	(United States) P Sampras	6	6
(Australia) T Woodbridge	2	4
(Germany) T Haas	2	6	7
8	(France) F Santoro	6	3	5
3	(Chile) M Ríos	6	6
(France) N Escudé	2	3
Q	(United States) R Reneberg	5	4
WC	(France) A Di Pasquale	7	6

Quarterfinals
1	(United States) P Sampras
(Germany) T Haas	w/o
3	(Chile) M Ríos	6	6
WC	(France) A Di Pasquale	4	0

Semifinals
(Germany) T Haas	6	1
3	(Chile) M Ríos	2	0^{r}

=== Bottom half ===
First round
5	(Netherlands) J Siemerink	6	4	4
(Italy) G Pozzi	2	6	6
(Spain) J Alonso	3	1
Q	(France) O Delaître	6	6
(Romania) A Pavel	6	6
WC	(France) L Roux	3	1
(France) J Golmard	6^{4}	2
4	(Spain) À Corretja	7^{7}	6
7	(France) C Pioline	6^{4}	6	6
(France) S Grosjean	7^{7}	4	1
Q	(United Kingdom) D Sapsford	2	6	4
(South Africa) W Ferreira	6	3	6
(Switzerland) M Rosset	6^{5}	5
(Morocco) H Arazi	7^{7}	7
(United States) S Campbell	2	2
2	(Australia) P Rafter	6	6

Second round
(Italy) G Pozzi	6	0	4
Q	(France) O Delaître	1	6	6
(Romania) A Pavel	4	6	3
4	(Spain) À Corretja	6	2	6
7	(France) C Pioline	6^{3}	2
(South Africa) W Ferreira	7^{7}	6
(Morocco) H Arazi	3	3
2	(Australia) P Rafter	6	6

Quarterfinals
Q	(France) O Delaître	6^{2}	5
4	(Spain) À Corretja	7^{7}	7
(South Africa) W Ferreira	6	6
2	(Australia) P Rafter	4	1

Semifinals
4	(Spain) À Corretja	6	6
(South Africa) W Ferreira	3	2
