= 1999 Grand Prix de Tennis de Lyon – Singles =

Singles
- 1999 Grand Prix de Tennis de Lyon

Final
- Champion: (Ecuador) Nicolás Lapentti
- Runner-up: (Australia) Lleyton Hewitt
- Score: 6–3, 6–2

Events
Singles	Doubles
← 1998 ·	Grand Prix de Tennis de Lyon	· 2000 →

Àlex Corretja was the defending champion, but lost in the second round this year.

Nicolás Lapentti won the title, defeating Lleyton Hewitt, 6–3, 6–2 in the final.

== Seeds ==
1. (Russia) Yevgeny Kafelnikov (quarterfinals)
2. (United States) Todd Martin (second round)
3. (Brazil) Gustavo Kuerten (quarterfinals)
4. (Spain) Àlex Corretja (second round)
5. (Germany) Tommy Haas (second round)
6. (Ecuador) Nicolás Lapentti (champion)
7. (France) Cédric Pioline (second round)
8. (United States) Vincent Spadea (semifinals)
9. (Australia) Mark Philippoussis (second round)
10. (Spain) Albert Costa (second round, retired)
11. (Argentina) Mariano Zabaleta (third round)
12. (France) Sébastien Grosjean (third round)
13. (Australia) Lleyton Hewitt (final)
14. (Ukraine) Andrei Medvedev (second round)
15. (Russia) Marat Safin (second round)
16. (Switzerland) Marc Rosset (second round)

== Draw ==
=== Key ===
- Q = Qualifier
- WC = Wild card
- LL = Lucky loser
- Alt = Alternate
- SE = Special exempt
- PR = Protected ranking
- ITF = ITF entry
- JE = Junior exempt
- w/o = Walkover
- r = Retired
- d = Defaulted
- SR = Special ranking

=== Finals ===
Semifinals
8	(United States) Vincent Spadea	3	3
13	(Australia) Lleyton Hewitt	6	6
6	(Ecuador) Nicolás Lapentti	6^{5}	7^{8}	6
(Sweden) Magnus Gustafsson	7^{7}	6^{6}	2

Final
13	(Australia) Lleyton Hewitt	3	2
6	(Ecuador) Nicolás Lapentti	6	6

=== Top half ===
==== Section 1 ====
First round
Q	(United States) R Reneberg	6
(Germany) J Knippschild	3^{r}
Q	(Paraguay) R Delgado	3	3
PR	(Sweden) M Larsson	6	6
(France) A Di Pasquale	6	6^{2}	5
(United States) J Courier	2	7^{7}	7
WC	(France) G Raoux	6^{5}	2
(Netherlands) S Schalken	7^{7}	6

Second round
1	(Russia) Y Kafelnikov	6	3	6
Q	(United States) R Reneberg	3	6	4
PR	(Sweden) M Larsson	6	6
WC/16	(Switzerland) M Rosset	2	2
9	(Australia) M Philippoussis	3	6	1
(United States) J Courier	6	3	6
(Netherlands) S Schalken	6	1	4
8	(United States) V Spadea	2	6	6

Third round
1	(Russia) Y Kafelnikov	7	7
PR	(Sweden) M Larsson	5	5
(United States) J Courier	4	4
8	(United States) V Spadea	6	6

Quarterfinals
1	(Russia) Y Kafelnikov	2	6	6^{5}
8	(United States) V Spadea	6	3	7^{7}

==== Section 2 ====
First round
PR	(United States) C Woodruff	6	6
(France) A Clément	4	2
(Czech Republic) D Vacek	3	4
SE	(Switzerland) R Federer	6	6
(Croatia) G Ivanišević	4	6	6
(Italy) G Pozzi	6	3	4
(Austria) S Koubek	6	5	3
SE	(Sweden) M Tillström	2	7	6

Second round
4	(Spain) À Corretja	5	6^{0}
PR	(United States) C Woodruff	7	7^{7}
SE	(Switzerland) R Federer	6^{4}	6	4
13	(Australia) L Hewitt	7^{7}	2	6
11	(Argentina) M Zabaleta	6	6
(Croatia) G Ivanišević	4	4
SE	(Sweden) M Tillström	6	7^{7}
5	(Germany) T Haas	2	6^{3}

Third round
PR	(United States) C Woodruff	4	3
13	(Australia) L Hewitt	6	6
11	(Argentina) M Zabaleta	6	6^{4}	2
SE	(Sweden) M Tillström	4	7^{7}	6

Quarterfinals
13	(Australia) L Hewitt	6	7^{7}
SE	(Sweden) M Tillström	3	6^{1}

==== Section 3 ====
First round
(Netherlands) J Siemerink	6	7^{7}
(Morocco) H Arazi	3	6^{4}
(United States) J-M Gambill	6	6
(Slovakia) J Krošlák	1	2
(South Africa) W Ferreira	6	6
Q	(France) J Hanquez	4	3
(Spain) F Vicente	0	6	7^{7}
(Germany) D Prinosil	6	4	6^{5}

Second round
6	(Ecuador) N Lapentti	3	6	7^{7}
(Netherlands) J Siemerink	6	3	6^{4}
(United States) J-M Gambill	6	3	3
12	(France) S Grosjean	1	6	6
14	(Ukraine) A Medvedev	3	5
(South Africa) W Ferreira	6	7
(Spain) F Vicente	3	6^{4}
WC/3	(Brazil) G Kuerten	6	7^{7}

Third round
6	(Ecuador) N Lapentti	4	6	6
12	(France) S Grosjean	6	4	1
(South Africa) W Ferreira	6^{5}	3
WC/3	(Brazil) G Kuerten	7^{7}	6

Quarterfinals
6	(Ecuador) N Lapentti	5	6	7
WC/3	(Brazil) G Kuerten	7	4	5

==== Section 4 ====
First round
WC	(France) N Escudé	6	7
(Sweden) J Björkman	4	5
Q	(The Bahamas) M Knowles	4	1
(United States) J Tarango	6	6
(France) F Santoro	1	1
(Germany) R Schüttler	6	6
(Argentina) G Cañas	4	3
(Sweden) M Gustafsson	6	6

Second round
7	(France) C Pioline	1	0
WC	(France) N Escudé	6	6
(United States) J Tarango	6	1
10	(Spain) A Costa	4	0^{r}
15	(Russia) M Safin	1	4
(Germany) R Schüttler	6	6
(Sweden) M Gustafsson	6	4	6
2	(United States) T Martin	1	6	4

Third round
WC	(France) N Escudé	2	6	1
(United States) J Tarango	6	1	6
(Germany) R Schüttler	4	2
(Sweden) M Gustafsson	6	6

Quarterfinals
(United States) J Tarango	6^{4}	6	4
(Sweden) M Gustafsson	7^{7}	4	6
