= 1995 Grand Prix de Tennis de Lyon – Singles =

Tennis tournament

Singles
- 1995 Grand Prix de Tennis de Lyon

Final
- Champion: (South Africa) Wayne Ferreira
- Runner-up: (United States) Pete Sampras
- Score: 7–6^{(7–2)}, 5–7, 6–3

Details
- Draw: 32
- Seeds: 8

Events
| Singles | Doubles |
- Grand Prix de Tennis de Lyon

Marc Rosset was the defending champion, but lost in the first round this year.

Wayne Ferreira won the tournament, beating Pete Sampras 7–6^{(7–2)}, 5–7, 6–3 in the final.

== Seeds ==
1. (United States) Pete Sampras (final)
2. (Russia) Yevgeny Kafelnikov (semifinals)
3. (Switzerland) Marc Rosset (first round)
4. (South Africa) Wayne Ferreira (champion)
5. (United States) Todd Martin (semifinals)
6. (France) Arnaud Boetsch (first round)
7. (United Kingdom) Greg Rusedski (second round)
8. (Germany) Bernd Karbacher (first round)

== Draw ==
Key

- Q = Qualifier
- WC = Wild card
- LL = Lucky loser
- Alt = Alternate
- ITF = ITF entry
- PR = Protected ranking
- SR = Special ranking
- SE = Special exempt
- JE = Junior exempt
- JR = Junior Accelerator Programme entrant
- CO = College Accelerator Programme entrant
- NG = Next Gen Accelerator Program entrant
- w/o = Walkover
- r = Retired
- d = Defaulted

=== Finals ===
Semifinals
1 | (United States) Pete Sampras | 7^{7} | 6
5 | (United States) Todd Martin | 6^{2} | 4
4 | (South Africa) Wayne Ferreira | 1 | 7^{7} | 6
2 | (Russia) Yevgeny Kafelnikov | 6 | 6^{3} | 3

Final
1 | (United States) Pete Sampras | 6^{2} | 7 | 3
4 | (South Africa) Wayne Ferreira | 7^{7} | 5 | 6

=== Top half ===
First round
1 | (United States) P Sampras | 6 | 6
(France) G Forget | 3 | 4
Q | (Haiti) R Agénor | 6 | 6
Q | (France) J Hanquez | 4 | 2
(Argentina) J Frana | 5 | 4
Q | (France) M Huard | 7 | 6
WC | (France) Y Noah | 3 | 2
7 | (United Kingdom) G Rusedski | 6 | 6
3 | (Switzerland) M Rosset | 6 | 4 | 4
Q | (France) J-P Fleurian | 4 | 6 | 6
(Germany) C-U Steeb | 3 | 1
(Australia) P Rafter | 6 | 6
(France) L Roux | 6 | 7^{14}
WC | (France) N Escudé | 3 | 5^{12}
(Russia) A Chesnokov | 6^{5} | 6^{3}
5 | (United States) T Martin | 7^{7} | 7^{7}

Second round
1 | (United States) P Sampras | 6 | 6
Q | (Haiti) R Agénor | 4 | 1
Q | (France) M Huard | 6 | 6
7 | (United Kingdom) G Rusedski | 4 | 3
Q | (France) J-P Fleurian | 3 | 6^{3}
(Australia) P Rafter | 6 | 7^{7}
(France) L Roux | 3 | 4
5 | (United States) T Martin | 6 | 6

Quarterfinals
1 | (United States) P Sampras | 6 | 6
Q | (France) M Huard | 4 | 2
(Australia) P Rafter | 6 | 6^{2} | 2
5 | (United States) T Martin | 3 | 7^{7} | 6

Semifinals
1 | (United States) P Sampras | 7^{7} | 6
5 | (United States) T Martin | 6^{2} | 4

=== Bottom half ===
First round
6 | (France) A Boetsch | 2 | 4
(Germany) D Prinosil | 6 | 6
(Switzerland) J Hlasek | 6 | 6
(United States) J Palmer | 2 | 1
(Czech Republic) M Damm | 6 | 4 | 6
(Czech Republic) D Vacek | 3 | 6 | 3
WC | (France) J Golmard | 7 | 2 | 4
4 | (South Africa) W Ferreira | 5 | 6 | 6
8 | (Germany) B Karbacher | 7^{8} | 2 | 4
(France) C Pioline | 6^{6} | 6 | 6
(Italy) S Pescosolido | 6 | 4 | 2
(Spain) T Carbonell | 3 | 6 | 6
(France) O Delaître | 6 | 3 | 3
(Sweden) H Holm | 2 | 6 | 6
(France) G Raoux | 0 | 2
2 | (Russia) Y Kafelnikov | 6 | 6

Second round
(Germany) D Prinosil | 6 | 6
(Switzerland) J Hlasek | 1 | 4
(Czech Republic) M Damm | 7^{7} | 3 | 1
4 | (South Africa) W Ferreira | 6^{4} | 6 | 6
(France) C Pioline | 6 | 6
(Spain) T Carbonell | 2 | 2
(Sweden) H Holm | 5 | 3
2 | (Russia) Y Kafelnikov | 7 | 6

Quarterfinals
(Germany) D Prinosil | 2 | 6 | 3
4 | (South Africa) W Ferreira | 6 | 1 | 6
(France) C Pioline | 3 | 4
2 | (Russia) Y Kafelnikov | 6 | 6

Semifinals
4 | (South Africa) W Ferreira | 1 | 7^{7} | 6
2 | (Russia) Y Kafelnikov | 6 | 6^{3} | 3
