= 1996 Grand Prix de Tennis de Lyon – Singles =

Singles
- 1996 Grand Prix de Tennis de Lyon

Final
- Champion: (Russia) Yevgeny Kafelnikov
- Runner-up: (France) Arnaud Boetsch
- Score: 7–5, 6–3

Details
- Draw: 32
- Seeds: 8

Events
Singles	Doubles
← 1995 ·	Grand Prix de Tennis de Lyon	· 1997 →

Wayne Ferreira was the defending champion but lost in the first round to Younes El Aynaoui.

Yevgeny Kafelnikov won in the final 7–5, 6–3 against Arnaud Boetsch.

== Seeds ==
1. (Austria) Thomas Muster (first round)
2. (Russia) Yevgeny Kafelnikov (champion)
3. (South Africa) Wayne Ferreira (first round)
4. (Chile) Marcelo Ríos (quarterfinals)
5. (Sweden) Thomas Enqvist (semifinals)
6. (France) Cédric Pioline (first round)
7. n/a
8. (Germany) Michael Stich (second round)

== Draw ==
=== Key ===
- Q = Qualifier
- WC = Wild card
- LL = Lucky loser
- Alt = Alternate
- SE = Special exempt
- PR = Protected ranking
- ITF = ITF entry
- JE = Junior exempt
- w/o = Walkover
- r = Retired
- d = Defaulted
- SR = Special ranking

=== Finals ===
Semifinals
(France) Arnaud Boetsch	4	6	6
5	(Sweden) Thomas Enqvist	6	4	0
(United Kingdom) Tim Henman	1	3
2	(Russia) Yevgeny Kafelnikov	6	6

Final
(France) Arnaud Boetsch	5	3
2	(Russia) Yevgeny Kafelnikov	7	6

=== Top half ===
First round
1	(Austria) T Muster	3	3
(United States) C Woodruff	6	6
(Italy) A Gaudenzi	6	4	0
Q	(France) L Roux	3	6	6
(France) A Boetsch	6	6
(Ukraine) A Medvedev	2	4
(Italy) R Furlan	2	1
Q	(Russia) A Chesnokov	6	6
4	(Chile) M Ríos	4	6	7^{7}
LL	(Germany) A Rădulescu	6	4	6^{5}
(Sweden) M Tillström	6	6^{3}	7^{7}
(Belgium) F Dewulf	4	7^{7}	6^{3}
(Czech Republic) J Novák	4	2
Q	(Italy) G Pozzi	6	6
(Australia) J Stoltenberg	7	6^{6}	1
5	(Sweden) T Enqvist	5	7^{8}	6

Second round
(United States) C Woodruff	6	6^{5}	5
Q	(France) L Roux	3	7^{7}	7
(France) A Boetsch	6^{5}	5
Q	(Russia) A Chesnokov	7^{7}	4^{r}
4	(Chile) M Ríos	6	6
(Sweden) M Tillström	3	1
Q	(Italy) G Pozzi	3	3
5	(Sweden) T Enqvist	6	6

Quarterfinals
Q	(France) L Roux	3	1
(France) A Boetsch	6	6
4	(Chile) M Ríos	3	6	5
5	(Sweden) T Enqvist	6	2	7

Semifinals
(France) A Boetsch	4	6	6
5	(Sweden) T Enqvist	6	4	0

=== Bottom half ===
First round
6	(France) C Pioline	6^{4}	5
(Netherlands) J Siemerink	7^{7}	7
(United Kingdom) T Henman	6	6
WC	(France) G Forget	4	2
Q	(Slovakia) K Kučera	6	1	6
(Sweden) J Björkman	3	6	1
(Morocco) Y El Aynaoui	5	6	6
3	(South Africa) W Ferreira	7	4	4
WC/8	(Germany) M Stich	7^{7}	6
(Switzerland) J Hlasek	6^{4}	3
(Sweden) M Gustafsson	7	6
(United States) R Reneberg	5	2
(Switzerland) M Rosset	6	6^{3}	3
(Czech Republic) P Korda	4	7^{7}	6
(Czech Republic) D Vacek	6^{2}	7^{7}	4
2	(Russia) Y Kafelnikov	7^{7}	6^{5}	6

Second round
(Netherlands) J Siemerink	7^{7}	6^{3}	6^{5}
(United Kingdom) T Henman	6^{4}	7^{7}	7^{7}
Q	(Slovakia) K Kučera	7	6
(Morocco) Y El Aynaoui	5	2
WC/8	(Germany) M Stich	3	7^{11}	2
(Sweden) M Gustafsson	6	6^{9}	6
(Czech Republic) P Korda	4	3
2	(Russia) Y Kafelnikov	6	6

Quarterfinals
(United Kingdom) T Henman	7^{8}	6
Q	(Slovakia) K Kučera	6^{6}	2
(Sweden) M Gustafsson	7	5	3
2	(Russia) Y Kafelnikov	5	7	6

Semifinals
(United Kingdom) T Henman	1	3
2	(Russia) Y Kafelnikov	6	6
