= 1999 Grand Prix de Tennis de Lyon =

- Date: 18–25 October 1999
- Edition: 13th
- Category: International Series
- Draw: 48S / 16D
- Prize money: $725,000
- Surface: Carpet / indoor
- Location: Lyon, France
- Venue: Palais des Sports de Gerland

Champions

Singles
- (Ecuador) Nicolás Lapentti

Doubles
- (South Africa) Piet Norval / (Zimbabwe) Kevin Ullyett
← 1998 ·	Grand Prix de Tennis de Lyon	· 2000 →

The 1999 Grand Prix de Tennis de Lyon was a men's tennis tournament played on indoor carpet courts at the Palais des Sports de Gerland in Lyon, France, and was part of the International Series of the 1999 ATP Tour. It was the 13th edition of the tournament and was held from 18 October until 25 October 1999. Sixth-seeded Nicolás Lapentti won the singles title.

== Finals ==
=== Singles ===
(Ecuador) Nicolás Lapentti defeated (Australia) Lleyton Hewitt 6–3, 6–2

- It was Lapentti's 3rd title of the year and the 6th of his career.

=== Doubles ===
(South Africa) Piet Norval / (Zimbabwe) Kevin Ullyett defeated (South Africa) Wayne Ferreira / (Australia) Sandon Stolle 4–6, 7–6^{(7–5)}, 7–6^{(7–4)}

- It was Norval's 1st title of the year and the 9th of his career. It was Ullyett's 1st title of the year and the 6th of his career.
