= 1995 Grand Prix de Tennis de Lyon – Doubles =

Doubles
- 1995 Grand Prix de Tennis de Lyon

Final
- Champions: (Switzerland) Jakob Hlasek (Russia) Yevgeny Kafelnikov
- Runners-up: (South Africa) John-Laffnie de Jager (South Africa) Wayne Ferreira
- Score: 6–3, 6–3

Details
- Draw: 16
- Seeds: 4

Events
Singles	Doubles
← 1994 ·	Grand Prix de Tennis de Lyon	· 1996 →

Jakob Hlasek and Yevgeny Kafelnikov were the defending champions and successfully defended their title, winning in the final 6–3, 6–3, against John-Laffnie de Jager and Wayne Ferreira.

== Seeds ==
1. (Canada) Grant Connell / (United States) Patrick Galbraith (first round)
2. (Czech Republic) Cyril Suk / (Czech Republic) Daniel Vacek (first round)
3. (Switzerland) Jakob Hlasek / (Russia) Yevgeny Kafelnikov (champions)
4. (Spain) Tomás Carbonell / (Spain) Francisco Roig (quarterfinals)

== Draw ==
=== Key ===
- Q = Qualifier
- WC = Wild card
- LL = Lucky loser
- Alt = Alternate
- ITF = ITF entry
- PR = Protected ranking
- SR = Special ranking
- SE = Special exempt
- JE = Junior exempt
- JR = Junior Accelerator Programme entrant
- CO = College Accelerator Programme entrant
- NG = Next Gen Accelerator Program entrant
- w/o = Walkover
- r = Retired
- d = Defaulted

=== Draw ===
First round
1	(Canada) G Connell (United States) P Galbraith	6	3
WC	(France) G Forget (France) C Pioline	7	6
(United States) T Kronemann (Australia) D Macpherson	5	2
(United States) K Kinnear (United States) D Randall	7	6
4	(Spain) T Carbonell (Spain) F Roig	6	6	6
Q	(United States) M Bauer (Germany) D Prinosil	7	1	4
(South Africa) J-L de Jager (South Africa) W Ferreira	7	3	7
(France) R Gilbert (France) G Raoux	5	6	5
(South Africa) L Bale (South Africa) B Haygarth	6	6	6
WC	(France) J Golmard (France) Y Noah	7	3	7
(Australia) W Arthurs (Netherlands) T Kempers	6	3
3	(Switzerland) J Hlasek (Russia) Y Kafelnikov	7	6
(Czech Republic) M Damm (Australia) P Rafter	7	6	6
LL	(Australia) J Ireland (North Macedonia) A Kitinov	6	7	3
(France) O Delaître (United Kingdom) G Rusedski	6	6	6
2	(Czech Republic) C Suk (Czech Republic) D Vacek	3	7	4

Quarterfinals
WC	(France) G Forget (France) C Pioline	7	7
(United States) K Kinnear (United States) D Randall	6	6
4	(Spain) T Carbonell (Spain) F Roig	2	6	2
(South Africa) J-L de Jager (South Africa) W Ferreira	6	4	6
WC	(France) J Golmard (France) Y Noah	6	6	3
3	(Switzerland) J Hlasek (Russia) Y Kafelnikov	2	7	6
(Czech Republic) M Damm (Australia) P Rafter	3	6	7
(France) O Delaître (United Kingdom) G Rusedski	6	2	5

Semifinals
WC	(France) G Forget (France) C Pioline
(South Africa) J-L de Jager (South Africa) W Ferreira	w/o
3	(Switzerland) J Hlasek (Russia) Y Kafelnikov	6	6
(Czech Republic) M Damm (Australia) P Rafter	4	2

Final
(South Africa) J-L de Jager (South Africa) W Ferreira	3	3
3	(Switzerland) J Hlasek (Russia) Y Kafelnikov	6	6
