= 2024 Open Sud de France – Singles =

Singles
- 2024 Open Sud de France

Final
- Champion: (Kazakhstan) Alexander Bublik
- Runner-up: (Croatia) Borna Ćorić
- Score: 5–7, 6–2, 6–3

Details
- Draw: 28 (4Q, 3WC)
- Seeds: 8

Events
Singles	Doubles
← 2023 ·	Open Sud de France	· 2025 →

Alexander Bublik defeated Borna Ćorić in the final, 5–7, 6–2, 6–3 to win the singles tennis title at the 2024 Open Sud de France. He saved three match points en route to his fourth career ATP Tour singles title (in the second round against Denis Shapovalov). Bublik became the second player in the Open Era (after Arthur Ashe in 1975 WCT Finals) to win a tour-level title after losing the first set in each of his matches.

Jannik Sinner was the reigning champion, but chose not to participate this year.

== Seeds ==
The top four seeds received a bye into the second round.

1. (Denmark) Holger Rune (semifinals, retired)
2. (Kazakhstan) Alexander Bublik (champion)
3. (Canada) Félix Auger-Aliassime (semifinals)
4. (Croatia) Borna Ćorić (final)
5. (United Kingdom) Andy Murray (first round)
6. (Kazakhstan) Alexander Shevchenko (quarterfinals)
7. (France) Alexandre Müller (second round)
8. (France) Gaël Monfils (first round)

== Draw ==
=== Key ===
- Q = Qualifier
- WC = Wild card
- LL = Lucky loser
- Alt = Alternate
- ITF = ITF entry
- PR = Protected ranking
- SR = Special ranking
- SE = Special exempt
- JE = Junior exempt
- JR = Junior Accelerator Programme entrant
- CO = College Accelerator Programme entrant
- NG = Next Gen Accelerator Program entrant
- w/o = Walkover
- r = Retired
- d = Defaulted

=== Finals ===
Semifinals
1/WC	(Denmark) Holger Rune	3	1^{r}
4	(Croatia) Borna Ćorić	6	4
3	(Canada) Félix Auger-Aliassime	6	4	4
2	(Kazakhstan) Alexander Bublik	4	6	6

Final
4	(Croatia) Borna Ćorić	7	2	3
2	(Kazakhstan) Alexander Bublik	5	6	6

=== Top half ===
First round
Q	(Spain) P Llamas Ruiz	7^{8}	7
(France) R Gasquet	6^{6}	5
(France) B Bonzi	3	5
(United States) M Mmoh	6	7
Q	(France) A Escoffier	6^{4}	3
7	(France) A Müller	7^{7}	6
(Spain) J Munar	4	6^{3}
(Spain) P Martínez	6	7^{7}
(Spain) B Zapata Miralles	6	4	2
(France) C Lestienne	4	6	6
(Italy) F Cobolli	6^{8}	6	6
8	(France) G Monfils	7^{10}	3	0

Second round
1/WC	(Denmark) H Rune	7	6
Q	(Spain) P Llamas Ruiz	5	2
(United States) M Mmoh	6	6
7	(France) A Müller	4	4
4	(Croatia) B Ćorić	6	6
(Spain) P Martínez	4	0
(France) C Lestienne	4	1
(Italy) F Cobolli	6	6

Quarterfinals
1/WC	(Denmark) H Rune	7^{8}	6
(United States) M Mmoh	6^{6}	4
4	(Croatia) B Ćorić	6	6
(Italy) F Cobolli	3	4

Semifinals
1/WC	(Denmark) H Rune	3	1^{r}
4	(Croatia) B Ćorić	6	4

=== Bottom half ===
First round
5	(United Kingdom) A Murray	6	6^{5}	3
(France) B Paire	2	7^{7}	6
WC	(France) H Mayot	6	7
WC	(France) L Pouille	4	5
(Germany) M Marterer	1	3
(France) A Cazaux	6	6
6	(Kazakhstan) A Shevchenko	6	4	6
Q	(Czech Republic) D Svrčina	4	6	4
Q	(France) U Blanchet	7^{9}	4	2
(France) G Barrère	6^{7}	6	6
(France) H Gaston	1	3
(Canada) D Shapovalov	6	6

Second round
(France) B Paire	1	4
WC	(France) H Mayot	6	6
(France) A Cazaux	5	6	6^{4}
3	(Canada) F Auger-Aliassime	7	2	7^{7}
6	(Kazakhstan) A Shevchenko	7^{7}	2	6
(France) G Barrère	6^{3}	6	3
(Canada) D Shapovalov	6	6^{12}	3
2	(Kazakhstan) A Bublik	1	7^{14}	6

Quarterfinals
WC	(France) H Mayot	5	1
3	(Canada) F Auger-Aliassime	7	6
6	(Kazakhstan) A Shevchenko	6	3	4
2	(Kazakhstan) A Bublik	4	6	6

Semifinals
3	(Canada) F Auger-Aliassime	6	4	4
2	(Kazakhstan) A Bublik	4	6	6

== Qualifying ==
=== Seeds ===
1. (Italy) Luca Nardi (first round)
2. (United States) Maxime Cressy (withdrew)
3. (Italy) Giulio Zeppieri (qualifying competition)
4. (France) Titouan Droguet (qualifying competition)
5. (Spain) Pablo Llamas Ruiz (qualified)
6. (Netherlands) Jesper de Jong (first round)
7. (Czech Republic) Dalibor Svrčina (qualified)
8. (France) Antoine Escoffier (qualified)

=== Qualifiers ===
1. (France) Antoine Escoffier
2. (Spain) Pablo Llamas Ruiz
3. (Czech Republic) Dalibor Svrčina
4. (France) Ugo Blanchet

=== Qualifying draw ===
==== First qualifier ====
First round
1	(Italy) Luca Nardi	3	4
(Spain) Daniel Rincón	6	6
(France) Hugo Grenier	5	5
8	(France) Antoine Escoffier	7	7

Qualifying competition
(Spain) Daniel Rincón	1	3
8	(France) Antoine Escoffier	6	6

==== Second qualifier ====
First round
Alt	(Italy) Francesco Maestrelli	4	3
(France) Calvin Hemery	6	6
(Italy) Matteo Gigante	3	2
5	(Spain) Pablo Llamas Ruiz	6	6

Qualifying competition
(France) Calvin Hemery	2	3
5	(Spain) Pablo Llamas Ruiz	6	6

==== Third qualifier ====
First round
3	(Italy) Giulio Zeppieri	6	6^{5}	6
(Spain) Oriol Roca Batalla	2	7^{7}	1
WC	(France) Matteo Martineau	2	6	5
7	(Czech Republic) Dalibor Svrčina	6	3	7

Qualifying competition
3	(Italy) Giulio Zeppieri	6	3	5
7	(Czech Republic) Dalibor Svrčina	3	6	7

==== Fourth qualifier ====
First round
4	(France) Titouan Droguet	7^{7}	6
WC	(France) Clément Chidekh	6^{5}	4
(France) Ugo Blanchet	6	6
6	(Netherlands) Jesper de Jong	3	2

Qualifying competition
4	(France) Titouan Droguet	2	4
(France) Ugo Blanchet	6	6
