= 1996 Grand Prix de Tennis de Lyon – Doubles =

Doubles
- 1996 Grand Prix de Tennis de Lyon

Final
- Champions: (United States) Jim Grabb (United States) Richey Reneberg
- Runners-up: (United Kingdom) Neil Broad (South Africa) Piet Norval
- Score: 6–2, 6–1

Details
- Draw: 16
- Seeds: 4

Events
Singles	Doubles
← 1995 ·	Grand Prix de Tennis de Lyon	· 1997 →

Jakob Hlasek and Yevgeny Kafelnikov were the defending champions but they competed with different partners that year, Hlasek with Guy Forget and Kafelnikov with Daniel Vacek.

Forget and Hlasek lost in the first round to Joost Winnink and Fernon Wibier, as did Kafelnikov and Vacek to Jiří Novák and Pavel Vízner.

Jim Grabb and Richey Reneberg won in the final 6–2, 6–1 against Neil Broad and Piet Norval.

== Seeds ==
1. (Canada) Grant Connell / (United States) Patrick Galbraith (semifinals)
2. (France) Guy Forget / (Switzerland) Jakob Hlasek (first round)
3. (Sweden) Jonas Björkman / (Sweden) Nicklas Kulti (quarterfinals)
4. (Russia) Yevgeny Kafelnikov / (Czech Republic) Daniel Vacek (first round)

== Draw ==
=== Key ===
- Q = Qualifier
- WC = Wild card
- LL = Lucky loser
- Alt = Alternate
- SE = Special exempt
- PR = Protected ranking
- ITF = ITF entry
- JE = Junior exempt
- w/o = Walkover
- r = Retired
- d = Defaulted
- SR = Special ranking

First round
1	(Canada) G Connell (United States) P Galbraith	7	6	6
(Belgium) L Pimek (South Africa) B Talbot	6	7	3
(South Africa) M Barnard (Sweden) P Nyborg	4	7	4
WC	(France) A Boetsch (France) C Pioline	6	6	6
4	(Russia) Y Kafelnikov (Czech Republic) D Vacek	6	4	3
(Czech Republic) J Novák (Czech Republic) P Vízner	3	6	6
(United Kingdom) N Broad (South Africa) P Norval	7	6
WC	(France) O Delaître (France) R Gilbert	6	3
(United States) J Grabb (United States) R Reneberg	7	7
(South Africa) E Ferreira (Netherlands) J Siemerink	6	5
(Czech Republic) P Korda (Czech Republic) C Suk	2	4
3	(Sweden) J Björkman (Sweden) N Kulti	6	6
WC	(Sweden) T Enqvist (France) L Roux	4	4
(South Africa) J-L de Jager (South Africa) C van Rensburg	6	6
Q	(Netherlands) J Winnink (Netherlands) F Wibier	6	6
2	(France) G Forget (Switzerland) J Hlasek	4	3

Quarterfinals
1	(Canada) G Connell (United States) P Galbraith	7	6
WC	(France) A Boetsch (France) C Pioline	6	1
(Czech Republic) J Novák (Czech Republic) P Vízner	7	4	4
(United Kingdom) N Broad (South Africa) P Norval	6	6	6
(United States) J Grabb (United States) R Reneberg	7	7
3	(Sweden) J Björkman (Sweden) N Kulti	6	6
(South Africa) J-L de Jager (South Africa) C van Rensburg	3	4
Q	(Netherlands) J Winnink (Netherlands) F Wibier	6	6

Semifinals
1	(Canada) G Connell (United States) P Galbraith	6	3
(United Kingdom) N Broad (South Africa) P Norval	7	6
(United States) J Grabb (United States) R Reneberg	6	6
Q	(Netherlands) J Winnink (Netherlands) F Wibier	4	0

Final
(United Kingdom) N Broad (South Africa) P Norval	2	1
(United States) J Grabb (United States) R Reneberg	6	6
