= 1998 Grand Prix de Tennis de Lyon – Doubles =

Doubles
- 1998 Grand Prix de Tennis de Lyon

Final
- Champions: (France) Olivier Delaître (France) Fabrice Santoro
- Runners-up: (Spain) Tomás Carbonell (Spain) Francisco Roig
- Score: 6–2, 6–2

Details
- Draw: 16
- Seeds: 4

Events
Singles	Doubles
← 1997 ·	Grand Prix de Tennis de Lyon	· 1999 →

Ellis Ferreira and Patrick Galbraith were the defending champions, but did not participate this year.

Olivier Delaître and Fabrice Santoro won in the final 6–2, 6–2, against Tomás Carbonell and Francisco Roig.

== Seeds ==
1. (France) Olivier Delaître / (France) Fabrice Santoro (champions)
2. (Australia) Joshua Eagle / (Australia) Andrew Florent (semifinals)
3. (South Africa) Grant Stafford / (Zimbabwe) Kevin Ullyett (quarterfinals)
4. (Spain) Tomás Carbonell / (Spain) Francisco Roig (final)

== Draw ==
=== Key ===
- Q = Qualifier
- WC = Wild card
- LL = Lucky loser
- Alt = Alternate
- ITF = ITF entry
- PR = Protected ranking
- SR = Special ranking
- SE = Special exempt
- JE = Junior exempt
- JR = Junior Accelerator Programme entrant
- CO = College Accelerator Programme entrant
- NG = Next Gen Accelerator Program entrant
- w/o = Walkover
- r = Retired
- d = Defaulted

=== Draw ===
First round
1	(France) O Delaître (France) F Santoro	6	6
(Netherlands) T Kempers (Netherlands) M Oosting	4	2
(South Africa) J-L de Jager (South Africa) R Koenig	6	3
WC	(France) N Escudé (France) S Grosjean	7	6
3	(South Africa) G Stafford (Zimbabwe) K Ullyett	6	6
(Argentina) P Albano (United States) J Tarango	4	4
(United States) M Keil (Australia) P Rafter	6	4
(United States) B MacPhie (United States) R Reneberg	7	6
Q	(Socialist Federal Republic of Yugoslavia) N Djordjevic (Belgium) L Pimek	5	4
WC	(Germany) T Haas (Switzerland) M Rosset	7	6
WC	(France) A Clément (France) J Golmard	5	6	3
4	(Spain) T Carbonell (Spain) F Roig	7	3	6
(Australia) A Kratzmann (United States) J Waite	1	1^{r}
(United Kingdom) N Broad (Australia) P Tramacchi	6	0
(South Africa) W Ferreira (South Africa) C Haggard	3	4
2	(Australia) J Eagle (Australia) A Florent	6	6

Quarterfinals
1	(France) O Delaître (France) F Santoro	2	6	6
WC	(France) N Escudé (France) S Grosjean	6	4	4
3	(South Africa) G Stafford (Zimbabwe) K Ullyett	3	6	3
(United States) B MacPhie (United States) R Reneberg	6	3	6
WC	(Germany) T Haas (Switzerland) M Rosset	3	3
4	(Spain) T Carbonell (Spain) F Roig	6	6
(United Kingdom) N Broad (Australia) P Tramacchi	4	4
2	(Australia) J Eagle (Australia) A Florent	6	6

Semifinals
1	(France) O Delaître (France) F Santoro	6	7
(United States) B MacPhie (United States) R Reneberg	2	6
4	(Spain) T Carbonell (Spain) F Roig	2	6	6
2	(Australia) J Eagle (Australia) A Florent	6	4	4

Final
1	(France) O Delaître (France) F Santoro	6	6
4	(Spain) T Carbonell (Spain) F Roig	2	2
