= 1996 Grand Prix de Tennis de Lyon =

- Date: 30 September – 6 October 1996
- Edition: 10th
- Category: World Series
- Draw: 32S / 16D
- Prize money: $725,000
- Surface: Carpet / indoor
- Location: Lyon, France
- Venue: Palais des Sports de Gerland

Champions

Singles
- (Russia) Yevgeny Kafelnikov

Doubles
- (United States) Jim Grabb / (United States) Richey Reneberg
← 1995 ·	Grand Prix de Tennis de Lyon	· 1997 →

The 1996 Grand Prix de Tennis de Lyon was a men's tennis tournament played on indoor carpet courts at the Palais des Sports de Gerland in Lyon, France, and was part of the World Series of the 1996 ATP Tour. It was the tenth edition of the tournament and was held from 30 September through 6 October 1996. Second-seeded Yevgeny Kafelnikov won the singles title.

== Finals ==
=== Singles ===
(Russia) Yevgeny Kafelnikov defeated (France) Arnaud Boetsch 7–5, 6–3

- It was Kafelnikov's 9th singles title of the year and the 24th of his career.

=== Doubles ===
(United States) Jim Grabb / (United States) Richey Reneberg defeated (United Kingdom) Neil Broad / (South Africa) Piet Norval 6–2, 6–1

- It was Grabb's 2nd title of the year and the 22nd of his career. It was Reneberg's 2nd title of the year and the 19th of his career.
