= 1997 Grand Prix de Tennis de Lyon – Doubles =

Doubles
- 1997 Grand Prix de Tennis de Lyon

Final
- Champions: (South Africa) Ellis Ferreira (United States) Patrick Galbraith
- Runners-up: (France) Olivier Delaître (France) Fabrice Santoro
- Score: 3–6, 6–2, 6–4

Details
- Draw: 16
- Seeds: 4

Events
Singles	Doubles
← 1996 ·	Grand Prix de Tennis de Lyon	· 1998 →

Jim Grabb and Richey Reneberg were the defending champions, but did not participate together this year. Grabb partnered Wayne Black, losing in the first round. Reneberg partnered Sjeng Schalken, losing in the first round.

Ellis Ferreira and Patrick Galbraith won in the final 3–6, 6–2, 6–4, against Olivier Delaître and Fabrice Santoro.

== Seeds ==
1. (South Africa) Ellis Ferreira / (United States) Patrick Galbraith (champions)
2. (The Bahamas) Mark Knowles / (Canada) Daniel Nestor (quarterfinals)
3. (United Kingdom) Neil Broad / (South Africa) Piet Norval (quarterfinals)
4. (Zimbabwe) Wayne Black / (United States) Jim Grabb (first round)

== Draw ==
=== Key ===
- Q = Qualifier
- WC = Wild card
- LL = Lucky loser
- Alt = Alternate
- SE = Special exempt
- PR = Protected ranking
- ITF = ITF entry
- JE = Junior exempt
- w/o = Walkover
- r = Retired
- d = Defaulted
- SR = Special ranking

=== Draw ===
First round
1	(South Africa) E Ferreira (United States) P Galbraith	6	6
(United States) D Randall (United States) J Waite	2	1
WC	(France) A Boetsch (France) L Roux	6	5	3
(Netherlands) M Oosting (New Zealand) B Steven	1	7	6
3	(United Kingdom) N Broad (South Africa) P Norval	7	7
WC	(France) C Pioline (France) G Raoux	6	6
(Spain) À Corretja (Netherlands) S Groen	7	7
Q	(United States) R Reneberg (Netherlands) S Schalken	6	6
(France) O Delaître (France) F Santoro	6	4	6
WC	(France) J-P Fleurian (France) S Simian	3	6	4
(Belgium) L Pimek (Netherlands) F Wibier	6	6	6
4	(Zimbabwe) W Black (United States) J Grabb	4	7	1
(Australia) P Rafter (Australia) M Tebbutt	6	6
(North Macedonia) A Kitinov (South Africa) B Talbot	3	4
(Argentina) P Albano (Germany) M-K Goellner	3	4
2	(The Bahamas) M Knowles (Canada) D Nestor	6	6

Quarterfinals
1	(South Africa) E Ferreira (United States) P Galbraith	6	7
(Netherlands) M Oosting (New Zealand) B Steven	4	6
3	(United Kingdom) N Broad (South Africa) P Norval	6	4	5
(Spain) À Corretja (Netherlands) S Groen	2	6	7
(France) O Delaître (France) F Santoro	6	6
(Belgium) L Pimek (Netherlands) F Wibier	4	4
(Australia) P Rafter (Australia) M Tebbutt	6	6
2	(The Bahamas) M Knowles (Canada) D Nestor	3	4

Semifinals
1	(South Africa) E Ferreira (United States) P Galbraith	6	6
(Spain) À Corretja (Netherlands) S Groen	3	4
(France) O Delaître (France) F Santoro	6	3	6
(Australia) P Rafter (Australia) M Tebbutt	4	6	4

Final
1	(South Africa) E Ferreira (United States) P Galbraith	3	6	6
(France) O Delaître (France) F Santoro	6	2	4
