= 1997 Grand Prix de Tennis de Lyon – Singles =

Singles
- 1997 Grand Prix de Tennis de Lyon

Final
- Champion: (France) Fabrice Santoro
- Runner-up: (Germany) Tommy Haas
- Score: 6–4, 6–4

Events
Singles	Doubles
← 1996 ·	Grand Prix de Tennis de Lyon	· 1998 →

Yevgeny Kafelnikov was the defending champion, but lost in the semifinals this year.

Fabrice Santoro won the tournament, beating Tommy Haas 6–4, 6–4 in the final.

== Seeds ==
1. (Australia) Patrick Rafter (first round)
2. (Russia) Yevgeny Kafelnikov (semifinals)
3. (Spain) Àlex Corretja (first round)
4. (Spain) Félix Mantilla (quarterfinals)
5. (Sweden) Thomas Enqvist (quarterfinals)
6. (Netherlands) Richard Krajicek (second round)
7. (Australia) Mark Philippoussis (semifinals)
8. (United Kingdom) Tim Henman (second round)

== Draw ==
=== Key ===
- Q = Qualifier
- WC = Wild card
- LL = Lucky loser
- Alt = Alternate
- SE = Special exempt
- PR = Protected ranking
- ITF = ITF entry
- JE = Junior exempt
- w/o = Walkover
- r = Retired
- d = Defaulted
- SR = Special ranking

=== Finals ===
Semifinals
7	(Australia) Mark Philippoussis	4	2
(France) Fabrice Santoro	6	6
(Germany) Tommy Haas	4	6	6
2	(Russia) Yevgeny Kafelnikov	6	4	3

Final
(France) Fabrice Santoro	6	6
(Germany) Tommy Haas	4	4

=== Top half ===
First round
1	(Australia) P Rafter	3	6^{5}
WC	(France) A Clément	6	7^{7}
(France) C Pioline	4	7	6
WC	(France) S Grosjean	6	5	3
(Belgium) F Dewulf	6^{5}	7	4
(United States) R Reneberg	7^{7}	5	6
Q	(France) N Thomann	6^{4}	6	3
7	(Australia) M Philippoussis	7^{7}	4	6
WC/4	(Spain) F Mantilla	6	6
(Ukraine) A Medvedev	3	0
(Spain) JA Viloca Puig	2	4
(France) L Roux	6	6
Q	(Belgium) C Van Garsse	3	2
(France) F Santoro	6	6
(Morocco) H Arazi	3	3
6	(Netherlands) R Krajicek	6	6

Second round
WC	(France) A Clément	2	2
(France) C Pioline	6	6
(United States) R Reneberg	6	6^{6}	4
7	(Australia) M Philippoussis	4	7^{8}	6
WC/4	(Spain) F Mantilla	7	6
(France) L Roux	5	1
(France) F Santoro	2	7^{8}	7^{7}
6	(Netherlands) R Krajicek	6	6^{6}	6^{4}

Quarterfinals
(France) C Pioline	3	6	6^{4}
7	(Australia) M Philippoussis	6	3	7^{7}
WC/4	(Spain) F Mantilla	1	1
(France) F Santoro	6	6

Semifinals
7	(Australia) M Philippoussis	4	2
(France) F Santoro	6	6

=== Bottom half ===
First round
5	(Sweden) T Enqvist	4	6	6
(Netherlands) S Schalken	6	3	3
(United States) T Martin	6	7^{7}
Q	(France) O Mutis	2	6^{5}
(Germany) T Haas	6	6
(Spain) A Portas	1	3
(Spain) J Alonso	2	6	6
3	(Spain) À Corretja	6	4	1
8	(United Kingdom) T Henman	6	1
(France) G Raoux	1	0^{r}
(France) A Boetsch	5	2
(Germany) M-K Goellner	7	6
Q	(Australia) R Fromberg	6^{6}	6^{4}
LL	(Netherlands) F Wibier	7^{8}	7^{7}
(New Zealand) B Steven	1	2
2	(Russia) Y Kafelnikov	6	6

Second round
5	(Sweden) T Enqvist	7	6
(United States) T Martin	5	3
(Germany) T Haas	6	6
(Spain) J Alonso	2	3
8	(United Kingdom) T Henman	3	4
(Germany) M-K Goellner	6	6
LL	(Netherlands) F Wibier	3	4
2	(Russia) Y Kafelnikov	6	6

Quarterfinals
5	(Sweden) T Enqvist	3	3
(Germany) T Haas	6	6
(Germany) M-K Goellner	4	5
2	(Russia) Y Kafelnikov	6	7

Semifinals
(Germany) T Haas	4	6	6
2	(Russia) Y Kafelnikov	6	4	3
