= 2024 Open Sud de France =

- Date: 29 January–4 February 2024
- Edition: 37th
- Draw: 28S / 16D
- Prize money: €579,320
- Surface: Hard (Indoor)
- Location: Montpellier, France
- Venue: Sud de France Arena

Champions

Singles
- (Kazakhstan) Alexander Bublik

Doubles
- (France) Sadio Doumbia / (France) Fabien Reboul
- Open Sud de France

The 2024 Open Sud de France was a men's tennis tournament played on indoor hard courts. It was the 37th edition of the Open Sud de France, and part of the ATP Tour 250 series of the 2024 ATP Tour. It took place at the Arena Montpellier in Montpellier, France, from 29 January until 4 February 2024.

== Finals ==
=== Singles ===
- (Kazakhstan) Alexander Bublik def. (Croatia) Borna Ćorić, 5–7, 6–2, 6–3

=== Doubles ===
- (France) Sadio Doumbia / (France) Fabien Reboul def. (France) Albano Olivetti / (Austria) Sam Weissborn, 6–7^{(5–7)}, 6–4, [10–6]

== Singles main draw entrants ==
=== Seeds ===
Country	Player	Rank^{1}	Seed
DEN	Holger Rune	8	1
KAZ	Alexander Bublik	27	2
CAN	Félix Auger-Aliassime	30	3
CRO	Borna Ćorić	40	4
GBR	Andy Murray	44	5
KAZ	Alexander Shevchenko	48	6
FRA	Alexandre Müller	73	7
FRA	Gaël Monfils	76	8

- ^{1} Rankings are as of 15 January 2024.

=== Other entrants ===
The following players received wildcards into the singles main draw :

- (France) Harold Mayot
- (France) Lucas Pouille
- (Denmark) Holger Rune

The following players received entry from the qualifying draw:

- (France) Ugo Blanchet
- (France) Antoine Escoffier
- (Spain) Pablo Llamas Ruiz
- (Czech Republic) Dalibor Svrčina

=== Withdrawals ===
- (Spain) Roberto Carballés Baena → replaced by (Italy) Flavio Cobolli
- (United Kingdom) Jack Draper → replaced by (France) Hugo Gaston
- (Italy) Lorenzo Musetti → replaced by (Spain) Pedro Martínez
- (France) Luca Van Assche → replaced by (United States) Michael Mmoh

== Doubles main draw entrants ==
=== Seeds ===
Country	Player	Country	Player	Rank^{1}	Seed
FRA	Sadio Doumbia	FRA	Fabien Reboul	71	1
GBR	Julian Cash	USA	Robert Galloway	96	2
GBR	Lloyd Glasspool	GBR	Henry Patten	104	3
FRA	Albano Olivetti	AUT	Sam Weissborn	109	4

- ^{1} Rankings are as of 15 January 2024.

=== Other entrants ===
The following pairs received wildcards into the doubles main draw:

- (France) Grégoire Barrère / (France) Lucas Pouille
- (France) Hugo Gaston / (France) Harold Mayot

=== Withdrawals ===
- (India) Yuki Bhambri / (Netherlands) Robin Haase → replaced by (Netherlands) Robin Haase / (Czech Republic) Petr Nouza
- (Spain) Roberto Carballés Baena / (Spain) Bernabé Zapata Miralles → replaced by (Spain) Jaume Munar / (Spain) Bernabé Zapata Miralles
- (United Kingdom) Jack Draper / (France) Luca Van Assche → replaced by (Spain) Pedro Martínez / (France) Alexandre Müller
