= 2026 Open Occitanie – Doubles =

Doubles
- 2026 Open Occitanie

Final
- Champions: (France) Théo Arribagé (France) Albano Olivetti
- Runners-up: (Germany) Constantin Frantzen (Netherlands) Robin Haase
- Score: 7–6^{(8–6)}, 6–1

Details
- Draw: 16
- Seeds: 4

Events
Singles	Doubles
- Open Sud de France

Théo Arribagé and Albano Olivetti defeated defending champion Robin Haase and his partner Constantin Frantzen in the final, 7–6^{(8–6)}, 6–1 to win the doubles tennis title at the 2026 Open Occitanie.

Haase and Botic van de Zandschulp were the reigning champions, but chose not to compete together this year. Van de Zandschulp partnered Tallon Griekspoor, but the pair withdrew from their quarterfinal match.

== Seeds ==
1. (France) Sadio Doumbia / (France) Fabien Reboul (semifinals)
2. (Germany) Jakob Schnaitter / (Germany) Mark Wallner (semifinals)
3. (Germany) Constantin Frantzen / (Netherlands) Robin Haase (final)
4. (France) Théo Arribagé / (France) Albano Olivetti (champions)

== Draw ==
Key

- Q = Qualifier
- WC = Wild card
- LL = Lucky loser
- Alt = Alternate
- ITF = ITF entry
- PR = Protected ranking
- SR = Special ranking
- SE = Special exempt
- JE = Junior exempt
- JR = Junior Accelerator Programme entrant
- CO = College Accelerator Programme entrant
- NG = Next Gen Accelerator Program entrant
- w/o = Walkover
- r = Retired
- d = Defaulted

=== Draw ===
First round
1	(France) S Doumbia (France) F Reboul	6	5	[10]
PR	(India) A Kadhe (Austria) N Oberleitner	4	7	[6]
(Czech Republic) T Macháč (Czech Republic) M Vocel	6	6
(United States) V Kirkov (Netherlands) B Stevens	4	4
4	(France) T Arribagé (France) A Olivetti	3	7^{7}	[10]
(Spain) I Cervantes (Spain) P Martínez	6	6^{5}	[6]
Alt	(France) C Chidekh (France) A Reymond	7^{7}	7^{7}
(Chinese Taipei) R Ho (Germany) H Jebens	6^{5}	6^{1}
(United Kingdom) J Paris (United Kingdom) M Willis	7^{7}	6
(Brazil) M Demoliner (Netherlands) J-J Rojer	6^{3}	3
WC	(France) U Humbert (France) F Martin	6	3	[5]
3	(Germany) C Frantzen (Netherlands) R Haase	4	6	[10]
(Netherlands) T Griekspoor (Netherlands) B van de Zandschulp	7	1	[10]
(United States) E King (United States) R Stalder	5	6	[7]
(France) V Royer (France) L Sanchez	6^{8}	4
2	(Germany) J Schnaitter (Germany) M Wallner	7^{10}	6

Quarterfinals
1	(France) S Doumbia (France) F Reboul	w/o
(Czech Republic) T Macháč (Czech Republic) M Vocel
4	(France) T Arribagé (France) A Olivetti	6	6^{2}	[10]
Alt	(France) C Chidekh (France) A Reymond	4	7^{7}	[5]
(United Kingdom) J Paris (United Kingdom) M Willis	3	6^{5}
3	(Germany) C Frantzen (Netherlands) R Haase	6	7^{7}
(Netherlands) T Griekspoor (Netherlands) B van de Zandschulp
2	(Germany) J Schnaitter (Germany) M Wallner	w/o

Semifinals
1	(France) S Doumbia (France) F Reboul	6^{1}	1
4	(France) T Arribagé (France) A Olivetti	7^{7}	6
3	(Germany) C Frantzen (Netherlands) R Haase	7^{7}	6^{4}	[10]
2	(Germany) J Schnaitter (Germany) M Wallner	6^{5}	7^{7}	[8]

Final
4	(France) T Arribagé (France) A Olivetti	7^{8}	6
3	(Germany) C Frantzen (Netherlands) R Haase	6^{6}	1
