= 2026 Open Occitanie – Singles =

Singles
- 2026 Open Occitanie

Final
- Champion: (Canada) Félix Auger-Aliassime
- Runner-up: (France) Adrian Mannarino
- Score: 6–3, 7–6^{(7–4)}

Details
- Draw: 28 (4Q, 3WC)
- Seeds: 8

Events
Singles	Doubles
- Open Sud de France

Defending champion Félix Auger-Aliassime defeated Adrian Mannarino in the final, 6–3, 7–6^{(7–4)} to win the singles tennis title at the 2026 Open Occitanie. It was his ninth ATP Tour singles title, surpassing Milos Raonic for the most singles titles by a Canadian man in the Open Era. Auger-Aliassime was also the first player to defend the title since Richard Gasquet in 2016.

At 40 years and 313 days old, Stan Wawrinka was the oldest man to win a non-Davis Cup tour-level match indoors since Ken Rosewall at the 1980 Melbourne Indoor.

== Seeds ==
The top four seeds received a bye into the second round.

1. (Canada) Félix Auger-Aliassime (champion)
2. (Italy) Flavio Cobolli (second round)
3. (Czech Republic) Tomáš Macháč (second round, retired)
4. (Netherlands) Tallon Griekspoor (quarterfinals)
5. (France) Ugo Humbert (second round)
6. (France) Arthur Fils (quarterfinals)
7. (Poland) Hubert Hurkacz (first round)
8. (United States) Aleksandar Kovacevic (second round)

== Draw ==
Key

- Q = Qualifier
- WC = Wild card
- LL = Lucky loser
- Alt = Alternate
- ITF = ITF entry
- PR = Protected ranking
- SR = Special ranking
- SE = Special exempt
- JE = Junior exempt
- JR = Junior Accelerator Programme entrant
- CO = College Accelerator Programme entrant
- NG = Next Gen Accelerator Program entrant
- w/o = Walkover
- r = Retired
- d = Defaulted

=== Finals ===
Semifinals
1/WC	(Canada) Félix Auger-Aliassime	6	6^{5}	6
Q	(France) Titouan Droguet	4	7^{7}	1
(France) Adrian Mannarino	1	6	6
Q	(United States) Martin Damm	6	3	4

Final
1/WC	(Canada) Félix Auger-Aliassime	6	7^{7}
(France) Adrian Mannarino	3	6^{4}

=== Top half ===
First round
(Serbia) H Medjedovic	6^{3}	4
WC	(Switzerland) S Wawrinka	7^{7}	6
Q	(Italy) A Vavassori	4	3
LL	(France) U Blanchet	6	6
(France) V Royer	6^{7}	7^{7}	2
6	(France) A Fils	7^{9}	6^{4}	6
(Serbia) M Kecmanović	6	3	6^{4}
(Spain) P Carreño Busta	4	6	7^{7}
Q	(France) T Droguet	6	7^{7}
(United Kingdom) J Choinski	2	6^{2}
Q	(France) M Kouamé	7^{7}	2	2
8	(United States) A Kovacevic	6^{5}	6	6

Second round
1/WC	(Canada) F Auger-Aliassime	6	7^{7}
WC	(Switzerland) S Wawrinka	4	6^{3}
LL	(France) U Blanchet	6^{4}	5
6	(France) A Fils	7^{7}	7
4	(Netherlands) T Griekspoor	6	6
(Spain) P Carreño Busta	4	4
Q	(France) T Droguet	4	7^{7}	6
8	(United States) A Kovacevic	6	6^{5}	4

Quarterfinals
1/WC	(Canada) F Auger-Aliassime	6	6
6	(France) A Fils	4	2
4	(Netherlands) T Griekspoor	6^{5}	6^{1}
Q	(France) T Droguet	7^{7}	7^{7}

Semifinals
1/WC	(Canada) F Auger-Aliassime	6	6^{5}	6
Q	(France) T Droguet	4	7^{7}	1

=== Bottom half ===
First round
5	(France) U Humbert	6	6
(Netherlands) B van de Zandschulp	3	4
(Spain) P Martínez	6^{3}	1
(France) A Mannarino	7^{7}	6
WC	(France) A Géa	6	0
(France) G Mpetshi Perricard	3	0^{r}
7	(Poland) H Hurkacz	6^{5}	4
Q	(United States) M Damm	7^{7}	6
(Spain) R Bautista Agut	5	6	7
(Australia) C O'Connell	7	3	5
(Georgia (country)) N Basilashvili	3	3
(Italy) L Nardi	6	6

Second round
5	(France) U Humbert	7^{7}	3	6^{4}
(France) A Mannarino	6^{4}	6	7^{7}
WC	(France) A Géa	6	4
3	(Czech Republic) T Macháč	3	5^{r}
Q	(United States) M Damm	6	6
(Spain) R Bautista Agut	1	3
(Italy) L Nardi	6	6
2/WC	(Italy) F Cobolli	2	3

Quarterfinals
(France) A Mannarino	5	6	6
WC	(France) A Géa	7	4	4
Q	(United States) M Damm	6	7^{10}
(Italy) L Nardi	3	6^{8}

Semifinals
(France) A Mannarino	1	6	6
Q	(United States) M Damm	6	3	4

== Qualifying ==
=== Seeds ===
1. (United Kingdom) Billy Harris (first round)
2. (France) Ugo Blanchet (qualifying competition, lucky loser)
3. (Spain) Roberto Carballés Baena (first round)
4. (Spain) Martín Landaluce (first round)
5. (France) Titouan Droguet (qualified)
6. (Sweden) Elias Ymer (first round)
7. (United States) Martin Damm (qualified)
8. (France) Hugo Grenier (qualifying competition)

=== Qualifiers ===
1. (United States) Martin Damm
2. (France) Titouan Droguet
3. (Italy) Andrea Vavassori
4. (France) Moïse Kouamé

=== Lucky loser ===
1. (France) Ugo Blanchet

=== Qualifying draw ===
==== First qualifier ====
First round
1	(United Kingdom) Billy Harris	6	6^{3}	2
(France) Clément Tabur	4	7^{7}	6
WC	(France) Matteo Martineau	6^{7}	4
7	(United States) Martin Damm	7^{9}	6

Qualifying competition
(France) Clément Tabur	6^{5}	7^{7}	6^{8}
7	(United States) Martin Damm	7^{7}	6^{3}	7^{10}

==== Second qualifier ====
First round
2	(France) Ugo Blanchet	6	6
(Spain) Bernabé Zapata Miralles	2	0
(France) Robin Bertrand	1	2
5	(France) Titouan Droguet	6	6

Qualifying competition
2	(France) Ugo Blanchet	6	6^{4}	2
5	(France) Titouan Droguet	4	7^{7}	6

==== Third qualifier ====
First round
3	(Spain) Roberto Carballés Baena	6^{8}	4
Alt	(Italy) Andrea Vavassori	7^{10}	6
(France) Geoffrey Blancaneaux	6	3	6^{4}
8	(France) Hugo Grenier	3	6	7^{7}

Qualifying competition
Alt	(Italy) Andrea Vavassori	6	7^{7}
8	(France) Hugo Grenier	3	6^{1}

==== Fourth qualifier ====
First round
4	(Spain) Martín Landaluce	4	6	5
(France) Clément Chidekh	6	3	7
WC	(France) Moïse Kouamé	6	4	7
6	(Sweden) Elias Ymer	4	6	5

Qualifying competition
(France) Clément Chidekh	5	7^{8}	3
WC	(France) Moïse Kouamé	7	6^{6}	6
