= Maxime Huard =

French tennis player

- Full name: Maxime Huard
- Country (sports): France
- Born: 25 January 1976 (age 49); Granville, France
- Plays: Right-handed
- Prize money: $43,844

Singles
- Career record: 2–1
- Career titles: 0
- Highest ranking: No. 225 (8 January 1996)

Doubles
- Career record: 0–1
- Career titles: 0
- Highest ranking: No. 310 (19 August 1996)

Grand Slam doubles results
- French Open: 1R (1995)

Maxime Huard (French: [maksim ɥaʁ]; born 25 January 1976) is a former professional tennis player from France.

== Biography ==
Huard was born in Granville, the second of three children, to parents who were both teachers.

As a junior he was one of the top players on the circuit, most notably in 1994, when he made the semi-finals of the French Open and quarter-finals of the US Open.

In 1995 he began competing professionally and after falling in the final round of qualifying for that year's French Open, he qualified for his first ATP Tour tournament at Lyon. In that tournament, the 1995 Grand Prix de Tennis de Lyon, he had upset wins over top 50 player Javier Frana as well as seventh seed Greg Rusedski, before losing in the quarter-finals to Pete Sampras. This remained his only main draw appearance on the ATP Tour. He peaked at No. 225 in the world early in 1996, which was his second and final year on the professional tour.
