= 1995 Grand Prix de Tennis de Lyon =

- Date: 16–23 October 1995
- Edition: 9th
- Category: World Series
- Draw: 32S / 16D
- Prize money: $575,000
- Surface: Carpet / indoor
- Location: Lyon, France
- Venue: Palais des Sports de Gerland

Champions

Singles
- (South Africa) Wayne Ferreira

Doubles
- (Switzerland) Jakob Hlasek / (Russia) Yevgeny Kafelnikov
← 1994 ·	Grand Prix de Tennis de Lyon	· 1996 →

The 1995 Grand Prix de Tennis de Lyon was a men's tennis tournament played on indoor carpet courts at the Palais des Sports de Gerland in Lyon, France, and was part of the World Series of the 1995 ATP Tour. It was the ninth edition of the tournament and was held from 16 October through 23 October 1995. Fourth-seeded Wayne Ferreira won the singles title.

== Finals ==
=== Singles ===
(South Africa) Wayne Ferreira defeated (United States) Pete Sampras 7–6^{(7–2)}, 5–7, 6–3

- It was Ferreira's 5th title of the year and the 16th of his career.

=== Doubles ===
(Switzerland) Jakob Hlasek / (Russia) Yevgeny Kafelnikov defeated (South Africa) John-Laffnie de Jager / (South Africa) Wayne Ferreira 6–3, 6–3

- It was Hlasek's only title of the year and the 25th of his career. It was Kafelnikov's 8th title of the year and the 15th of his career.
