= 2024 Open Sud de France – Doubles =

Doubles
- 2024 Open Sud de France

Final
- Champions: (France) Sadio Doumbia (France) Fabien Reboul
- Runners-up: (France) Albano Olivetti (Austria) Sam Weissborn
- Score: 6–7^{(5–7)}, 6–4, [10–6]

Details
- Draw: 16
- Seeds: 4

Events
Singles	Doubles
- Open Sud de France

Sadio Doumbia and Fabien Reboul defeated Albano Olivetti and Sam Weissborn in the final, 6–7^{(5–7)}, 6–4, [10–6] to win the doubles tennis title at the 2024 Open Sud de France.

Robin Haase and Matwé Middelkoop were the reigning champions, but Middelkoop chose not to participate this year. Haase partnered Petr Nouza, but lost in the semifinals to Olivetti and Weissborn.

== Seeds ==
1. (France) Sadio Doumbia / (France) Fabien Reboul (champions)
2. (United Kingdom) Julian Cash / (United States) Robert Galloway (first round)
3. (United Kingdom) Lloyd Glasspool / (United Kingdom) Henry Patten (semifinals)
4. (France) Albano Olivetti / (Austria) Sam Weissborn (final)

== Draw ==
Key

- Q = Qualifier
- WC = Wild card
- LL = Lucky loser
- Alt = Alternate
- ITF = ITF entry
- PR = Protected ranking
- SR = Special ranking
- SE = Special exempt
- JE = Junior exempt
- JR = Junior Accelerator Programme entrant
- CO = College Accelerator Programme entrant
- NG = Next Gen Accelerator Program entrant
- w/o = Walkover
- r = Retired
- d = Defaulted

=== Draw ===
First round
1	(France) S Doumbia (France) F Reboul	7^{7}	6
(Germany) C Frantzen (Germany) H Jebens	6^{5}	2
WC	(France) G Barrère (France) L Pouille	7^{7}	6
(Germany) A Mies (Australia) J-P Smith	6^{4}	4
3	(United Kingdom) L Glasspool (United Kingdom) H Patten	6	3	[10]
(India) A Chandrasekar (India) VS Prashanth	2	6	[7]
(Kazakhstan) A Bublik (Kazakhstan) A Shevchenko	6	6
(United States) E King (United States) R Stalder	4	3
(Spain) J Munar (Spain) B Zapata Miralles	3	2
(Spain) P Martínez (France) A Müller	6	6
WC	(France) H Gaston (France) H Mayot	6^{5}	4
4	(France) A Olivetti (Austria) S Weissborn	7^{7}	6
(France) T Arribagé (France) L Sanchez	6^{8}	6^{4}
(France) J Eysseric (Ukraine) D Molchanov	7^{10}	7^{7}
(Netherlands) R Haase (Czech Republic) P Nouza	3	6	[10]
2	(United Kingdom) J Cash (United States) R Galloway	6	2	[7]

Quarterfinals
1	(France) S Doumbia (France) F Reboul	7	2	[13]
WC	(France) G Barrère (France) L Pouille	5	6	[11]
3	(United Kingdom) L Glasspool (United Kingdom) H Patten	w/o
(Kazakhstan) A Bublik (Kazakhstan) A Shevchenko
(Spain) P Martínez (France) A Müller	7^{7}	4	[5]
4	(France) A Olivetti (Austria) S Weissborn	6^{3}	6	[10]
(France) J Eysseric (Ukraine) D Molchanov	7^{7}	1	[7]
(Netherlands) R Haase (Czech Republic) P Nouza	6^{3}	6	[10]

Semifinals
1	(France) S Doumbia (France) F Reboul	7	7^{7}
3	(United Kingdom) L Glasspool (United Kingdom) H Patten	5	6^{2}
4	(France) A Olivetti (Austria) S Weissborn	7^{8}	7^{7}
(Netherlands) R Haase (Czech Republic) P Nouza	6^{6}	6^{4}

Final
1	(France) S Doumbia (France) F Reboul	6^{5}	6	[10]
4	(France) A Olivetti (Austria) S Weissborn	7^{7}	4	[6]
