= 2025 Open Occitanie – Singles =

Singles
- 2025 Open Occitanie

Final
- Champion: (Canada) Félix Auger-Aliassime
- Runner-up: (United States) Aleksandar Kovacevic
- Score: 6–2, 6–7^{(7–9)}, 7–6^{(7–2)}

Details
- Draw: 28 (4Q, 3WC)
- Seeds: 8

Events
Singles	Doubles
- Open Sud de France

Félix Auger-Aliassime defeated Aleksandar Kovacevic in the final, 6–2, 6–7^{(7–9)}, 7–6^{(7–2)} to win the singles tennis title at the 2025 Open Occitanie. It was his second title of the season and his seventh career ATP Tour singles title. Kovacevic was the first qualifier to reach the final.

Alexander Bublik was the defending champion, but lost to Kovacevic in the quarterfinals.

== Seeds ==
The top four seeds received a bye into the second round.

1. Andrey Rublev (semifinals)
2. (Canada) Félix Auger-Aliassime (champion)
3. (Italy) Flavio Cobolli (second round)
4. (Kazakhstan) Alexander Bublik (quarterfinals)
5. (Netherlands) Tallon Griekspoor (quarterfinals)
6. (Belgium) David Goffin (first round)
7. (France) Arthur Rinderknech (second round)
8. (China) Bu Yunchaokete (quarterfinals)

== Draw ==
Key

- Q = Qualifier
- WC = Wild card
- LL = Lucky loser
- Alt = Alternate
- ITF = ITF entry
- PR = Protected ranking
- SR = Special ranking
- SE = Special exempt
- JE = Junior exempt
- JR = Junior Accelerator Programme entrant
- CO = College Accelerator Programme entrant
- NG = Next Gen Accelerator Program entrant
- w/o = Walkover
- r = Retired
- d = Defaulted

=== Finals ===
Semifinals
1/WC	Andrey Rublev	5	4
Q	(United States) Aleksandar Kovacevic	7	6
(Netherlands) Jesper de Jong	4	6^{4}
2	(Canada) Félix Auger-Aliassime	6	7^{7}

Final
Q	(United States) Aleksandar Kovacevic	2	7^{9}	6^{2}
2	(Canada) Félix Auger-Aliassime	6	6^{7}	7^{7}

=== Top half ===
First round
(United States) C Eubanks	7	6
Q	A Kachmazov	5	4
Q	(Georgia (country)) N Basilashvili	6	3	5
(Kazakhstan) M Kukushkin	3	6	0^{r}
(France) H Mayot	6^{2}	6	1
7	(France) A Rinderknech	7^{7}	2	6
WC	(France) G Barrère	4	6^{5}
(Germany) D Koepfer	6	7^{7}
(Italy) M Bellucci	6	6
(France) L Pouille	4	4
Q	(United States) A Kovacevic	6	3	6
6	(Belgium) D Goffin	2	6	4

Second round
1/WC	A Rublev	6	6
(United States) C Eubanks	4	3
Q	(Georgia (country)) N Basilashvili	6	7^{7}
7	(France) A Rinderknech	0	6^{4}
4	(Kazakhstan) A Bublik	6	6
(Germany) D Koepfer	4	2
(Italy) M Bellucci	5	6^{5}
Q	(United States) A Kovacevic	7	7^{7}

Quarterfinals
1/WC	A Rublev	5
Q	(Georgia (country)) N Basilashvili	2^{r}
4	(Kazakhstan) A Bublik	3	2
Q	(United States) A Kovacevic	6	6

Semifinals
1/WC	A Rublev	5	4
Q	(United States) A Kovacevic	7	6

=== Bottom half ===
First round
5	(Netherlands) T Griekspoor	7	6
(Netherlands) B van de Zandschulp	5	3
(France) A Mannarino	3	2
(France) R Gasquet	6	6
(Netherlands) J de Jong	7^{9}	2
WC	(France) Q Halys	6^{7}	0^{r}
8	(China) Y Bu	7^{7}	6
(Germany) D Altmaier	6^{1}	3
(Croatia) B Ćorić	3	5
Q	(France) C Lestienne	6	7
WC	(Switzerland) S Wawrinka	4	3
(France) A Cazaux	6	6

Second round
5	(Netherlands) T Griekspoor	6	3	7
(France) R Gasquet	3	6	5
(Netherlands) J de Jong	6	7^{7}
3	(Italy) F Cobolli	3	6^{2}
8	(China) Y Bu	6	6
Q	(France) C Lestienne	2	1
(France) A Cazaux	4	6^{5}
2	(Canada) F Auger-Aliassime	6	7^{7}

Quarterfinals
5	(Netherlands) T Griekspoor	6^{5}	4
(Netherlands) J de Jong	7^{7}	6
8	(China) Y Bu	3	4
2	(Canada) F Auger-Aliassime	6	6

Semifinals
(Netherlands) J de Jong	4	6^{4}
2	(Canada) F Auger-Aliassime	6	7^{7}

== Qualifying ==
=== Seeds ===
1. (United States) Aleksandar Kovacevic (qualified)
2. (Italy) Matteo Gigante (first round)
3. (France) Hugo Grenier (qualifying competition)
4. (France) Térence Atmane (qualifying competition)
5. (Spain) Alejandro Moro Cañas (first round, retired)
6. (France) Constant Lestienne (qualified)
7. (Spain) Pablo Carreño Busta (qualifying competition)
8. (France) Titouan Droguet (qualifying competition, retired)

=== Qualifiers ===
1. (United States) Aleksandar Kovacevic
2. (Georgia (country)) Nikoloz Basilashvili
3. Alibek Kachmazov
4. (France) Constant Lestienne

=== Qualifying draw ===
==== First qualifier ====
First round
1	(United States) Aleksandar Kovacevic	7^{7}	6
Alt	(France) Robin Bertrand	6^{4}	4
(Czech Republic) Dalibor Svrčina	4	5
7	(Spain) Pablo Carreño Busta	6	7

Qualifying competition
1	(United States) Aleksandar Kovacevic	6	7^{7}
7	(Spain) Pablo Carreño Busta	3	6^{4}

==== Second qualifier ====
First round
2	(Italy) Matteo Gigante	3	5
(Georgia (country)) Nikoloz Basilashvili	6	7
(France) Valentin Royer	6	3	6^{4}
8	(France) Titouan Droguet	4	6	7^{7}

Qualifying competition
(Georgia (country)) Nikoloz Basilashvili	3	6	5
8	(France) Titouan Droguet	6	3	4^{r}

==== Third qualifier ====
First round
3	(France) Hugo Grenier	3	6	6
(France) Calvin Hemery	6	1	2
Alibek Kachmazov	6	4
5	(Spain) Alejandro Moro Cañas	3	0^{r}

Qualifying competition
3	(France) Hugo Grenier	7^{7}	2	1
Alibek Kachmazov	6^{4}	6	6

==== Fourth qualifier ====
First round
4	(France) Térence Atmane	6	4	6
WC	(France) Clément Chidekh	4	6	4
WC	(France) Benoît Paire	0	4
6	(France) Constant Lestienne	6	6

Qualifying competition
4	(France) Térence Atmane	4	0
6	(France) Constant Lestienne	6	6
