= 2026 Open Occitanie =

- Date: 2–8 February 2026
- Edition: 39th
- Draw: 28S / 16D
- Surface: Hard (Indoor)
- Location: Montpellier, France
- Venue: Sud de France Arena

Champions

Singles
- (Canada) Félix Auger-Aliassime

Doubles
- (France) Théo Arribagé / (France) Albano Olivetti
- Open Sud de France

The 2026 Open Occitanie was a men's tennis tournament played on indoor hardcourts. It was the 39th edition of the event, and part of the ATP Tour 250 series of the 2026 ATP Tour. It took place at the Arena Montpellier in Montpellier, France, from 2–8 February 2026.

== Champions ==
=== Singles ===
- (Canada) Félix Auger-Aliassime def. (France) Adrian Mannarino, 6–3, 7–6^{(7–4)}

=== Doubles ===
- (France) Théo Arribagé / (France) Albano Olivetti def. (Germany) Constantin Frantzen / (Netherlands) Robin Haase, 7–6^{(8–6)}, 6–1

== Singles main draw entrants ==
=== Seeds ===
Country	Player	Rank^{1}	Seed
CAN	Félix Auger-Aliassime	8	1
ITA	Flavio Cobolli	22	2
CZE	Tomáš Macháč	24	3
NED	Tallon Griekspoor	26	4
FRA	Ugo Humbert	33	5
FRA	Arthur Fils	42	6
POL	Hubert Hurkacz	55	7
USA	Aleksandar Kovacevic	56	8

- ^{1} Rankings are as of 19 January 2026.

=== Other entrants ===
The following players received wildcards into the singles main draw:

- (Canada) Félix Auger-Aliassime
- (Italy) Flavio Cobolli
- (France) Arthur Géa
- (Switzerland) Stan Wawrinka

The following players received entry from the qualifying draw:

- (United States) Martin Damm
- (France) Titouan Droguet
- (France) Moïse Kouamé
- (Italy) Andrea Vavassori

The following player received entry as a lucky loser:

- (France) Ugo Blanchet

=== Withdrawals ===
- (France) Arthur Cazaux → replaced by (Spain) Pedro Martínez
- (France) Quentin Halys → replaced by (Georgia (country)) Nikoloz Basilashvili
- (United States) Mackenzie McDonald → replaced by (France) Ugo Blanchet
- (Finland) Emil Ruusuvuori → replaced by (Italy) Luca Nardi
- (Czech Republic) Dalibor Svrčina → replaced by (United Kingdom) Jan Choinski

== Doubles main draw entrants ==
=== Seeds ===
Country	Player	Country	Player	Rank^{1}	Seed
FRA	Sadio Doumbia	FRA	Fabien Reboul	56	1
GER	Jakob Schnaitter	GER	Mark Wallner	90	2
GER	Constantin Frantzen	NED	Robin Haase	103	3
FRA	Théo Arribagé	FRA	Albano Olivetti	107	4

- ^{1} Rankings are as of 19 January 2026.

=== Other entrants ===
The following pairs received wildcards into the doubles main draw:

- (France) Ugo Humbert / (France) Fabrice Martin
- ~~(France) Giovanni Mpetshi Perricard / (Switzerland) Stan Wawrinka~~

The following pair received entry as alternates:

- (France) Clément Chidekh / (France) Arthur Reymond

=== Withdrawals ===
- (France) Giovanni Mpetshi Perricard / (Switzerland) Stan Wawrinka → replaced by (France) Clément Chidekh / (France) Arthur Reymond
