= Palais des Sports de Gerland =

Indoor sporting arena

Palais des Sports
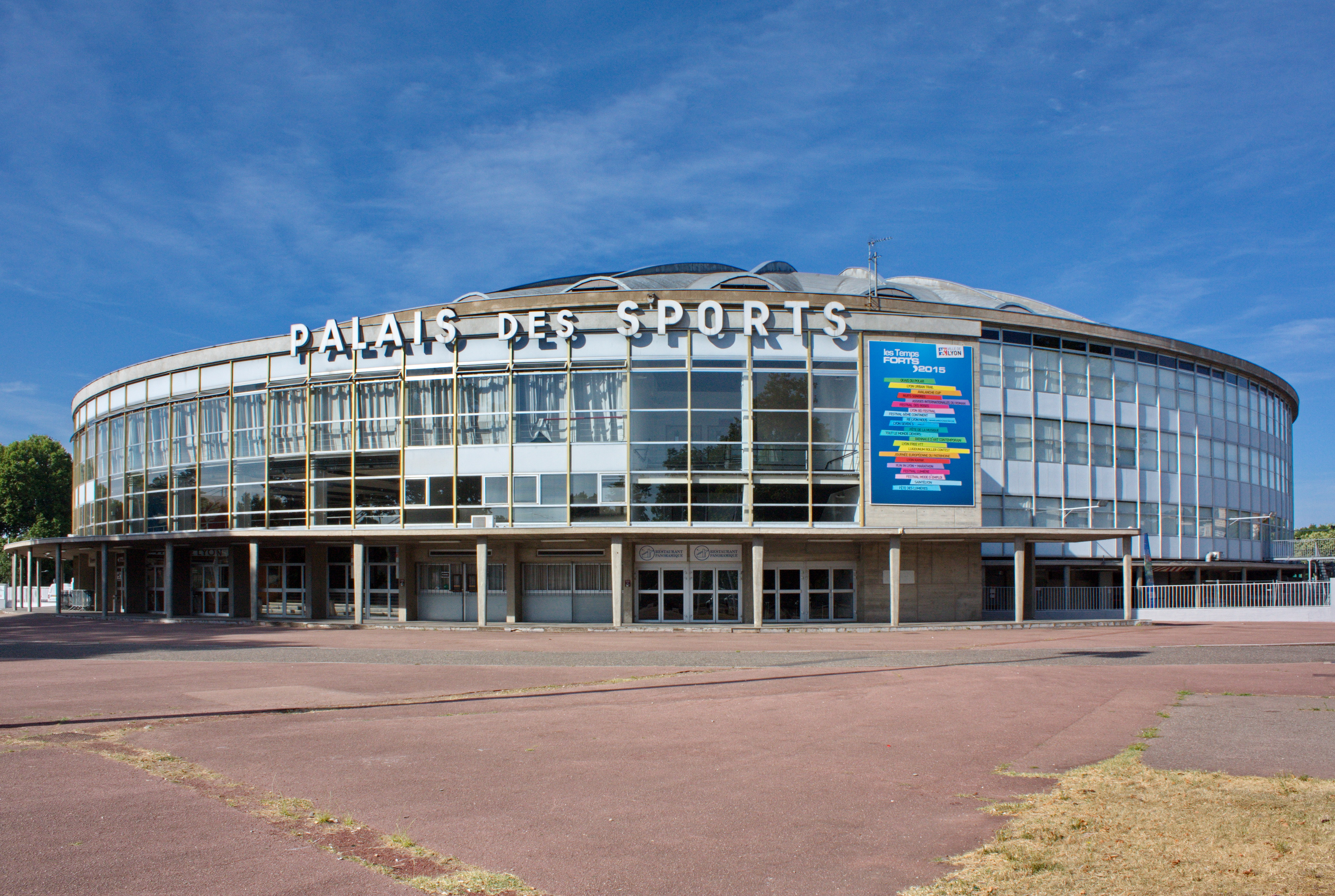
- Interactive map of Palais des Sports
- Full name: Palais des Sports de Gerland
- Location: Lyon, France
- Coordinates: 45°43′26.69″N 4°49′41.37″E
- Owner: City of Lyon
- Capacity: Tennis: 6,500
- Public transit: Stade de Gerland–Le LOU

Construction
- Groundbreaking: January 1960; 66 years ago
- Opened: May 1962; 64 years ago
- Architect: Louis Weckerlin

Tenants
- ASVEL Lyon-Villeurbanne (1970–80s); Grand Prix de Tennis de Lyon (1987–2009); WTA Lyon Open (2020–2023)

Palais des Sports de Gerland (English: Gerland Sports Palace) is an indoor sporting arena located in Lyon, France. The seating capacity of the arena is 5,910 people.

== History ==
It was the venue of the Grand Prix de Tennis de Lyon tournament. The arena was the regular home venue of ASVEL Lyon-Villeurbanne for European Champions cup games in the late 1970s and early 1980s, for which it had a maximum capacity for 10,000 spectators.

The arena also hosted the 1968 European Champions cup final in basketball, in which Real Madrid defeated Spartak Brno 98-95 in front of 8,000 spectators. The venue also saw France defeat the United States in the 1991 Davis Cup final. The arena hosted the last Saporta Cup final in 2002, in which Montepaschi Siena won the trophy. In 2006 hosted the 2006 European Figure Skating Championships.

== See also ==
- List of tennis stadiums by capacity

Preceded by Sports City of Real Madrid Pavilion; Madrid	FIBA European Champions Cup; Final Venue; 1968	Succeeded by Palau dels Esports; Barcelona
Preceded by Suncoast Dome; St. Petersburg	Davis Cup; Final Venue; 1991	Succeeded by Tarrant County Convention Center; Fort Worth
Preceded by Torwar Hall; Warsaw	Saporta Cup; Final Venue; 2002	Succeeded by Last final
Preceded by N/A	Grand Prix de Tennis de Lyon; Venue; 1987–2009	Succeeded by Arena Montpellier; Montpellier
