= Fabrice Santoro =

French tennis player (born 1972)

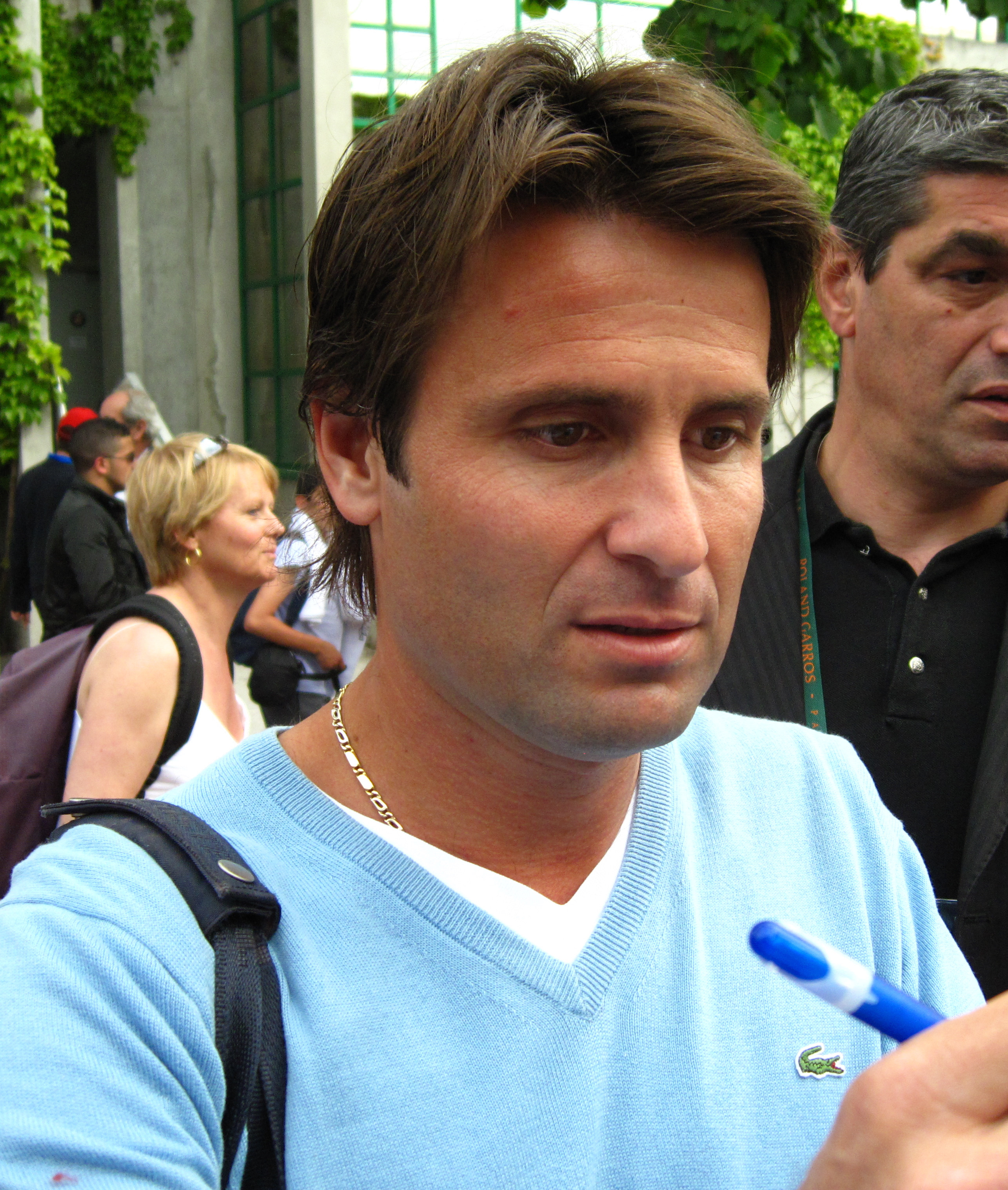
- Santoro at the 2009 French Open
- Country (sports): France
- Residence: Geneva, Switzerland
- Born: 9 December 1972 (age 53) Tahiti, French Polynesia, France
- Height: 1.78 m (5 ft 10 in)
- Turned pro: 1989 (amateur tour from 1988)
- Retired: 2010
- Plays: Right-handed (two-handed both sides)
- Prize money: $10,021,132

Singles
- Career record: 470–444
- Career titles: 6
- Highest ranking: No. 17 (6 August 2001)

Grand Slam singles results
- Australian Open: QF (2006)
- French Open: 4R (1991, 2001)
- Wimbledon: 3R (2001)
- US Open: 3R (1990, 1998, 1999, 2004)

Other tournaments
- Olympic Games: QF (1992)

Doubles
- Career record: 377–257
- Career titles: 24
- Highest ranking: No. 6 (5 July 1999)

Grand Slam doubles results
- Australian Open: W (2003, 2004)
- French Open: F (2004)
- Wimbledon: F (2006)
- US Open: SF (2003)

Other doubles tournaments
- Tour Finals: W (2005)

Mixed doubles
- Career titles: 1

Grand Slam mixed doubles results
- French Open: W (2005)

Team competitions
- Davis Cup: W (1991, 2001)

Fabrice Vetea Santoro (French: [fabʁis sɑ̃tɔʁo]; born 9 December 1972) is a French former professional tennis player. Successful in both singles and doubles, he had a lengthy professional career, with many of his accomplishments coming towards the end of his career, and he is popular among spectators and other players alike for his demeanour and shot-making abilities; he also plays two-handed on both the forehand and backhand sides.

Owing to his longevity on the tour and consistent ranking, Santoro holds several ATP records: the most career wins over top ten opponents for a player who never reached the top ten (40); he was the first player to appear in 70 Grand Slam men's singles events; and has the third-most losses in singles play behind Feliciano López and Fernando Verdasco (444).

In singles, Santoro won six titles, but reached the quarterfinals at a Grand Slam only once. His career-high ranking of world No. 17 belied his impressive record against top ten opposition.

He had greater success in doubles competition, with two Grand Slam doubles titles, one mixed doubles title, and 25 doubles championships overall to his name.

Since March 2019, Santoro has been the coach of Canadian tennis player Milos Raonic.

== Career overview ==
=== Juniors ===
After losing in the early rounds of the 1988 Jr French Open and 1988 Jr US Open, Santoro won the 1989 Jr French Open. He also had a semifinal appearance in the 1989 Jr US Open. He reached a career-high junior ranking of No. 3.

Junior Grand Slam results – Singles:

Australian Open: A (-)
French Open: W (1989)
Wimbledon: 3R (1989)
US Open: SF (1989)

=== Pro tour ===
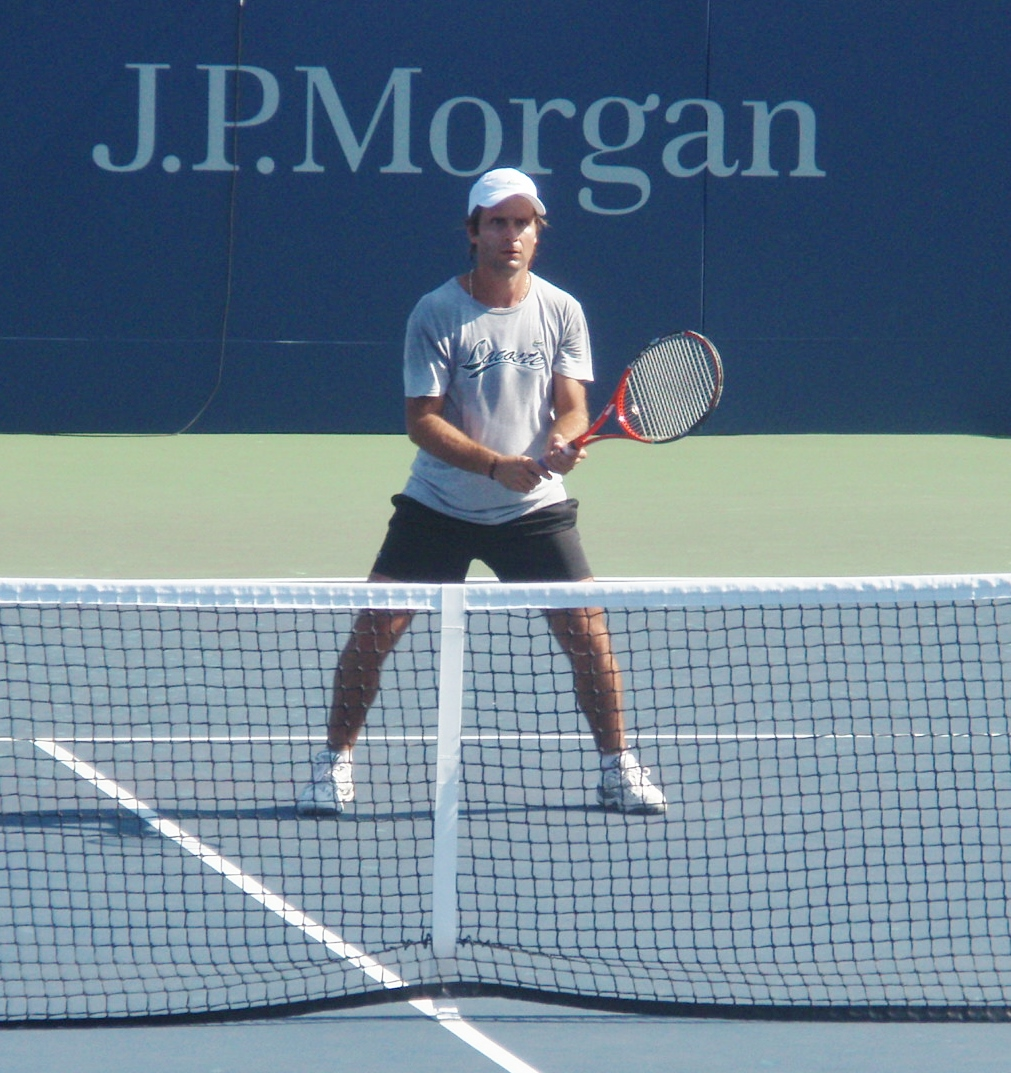
Fabrice Santoro volleys at US Open

When Santoro successfully defended his 2007 title by winning the 2008 Newport tournament at the age of 35, he became the oldest tennis player to win back-to-back championships at an ATP singles event.

In addition, Santoro won what was, at the time, the longest singles match in the Open Era: at the 2004 French Open, he beat fellow Frenchman Arnaud Clément in a 6-hour 33-minute first-round match (6–4, 6–3, 6–7(5), 3–6, 16–14). The record stood until John Isner defeated Nicolas Mahut at Wimbledon in 2010, but still remains the French Open record.

As a singles tennis player, the 2006 Australian Open was Santoro's only Grand Slam quarterfinal appearance.

In singles play, Santoro defeated 18 players who were ranked world no. 1 at some time during their careers: Novak Djokovic, Jimmy Connors, Mats Wilander, Boris Becker, Stefan Edberg, Jim Courier, Andre Agassi, Pete Sampras, Thomas Muster, Marcelo Ríos, Gustavo Kuerten, Carlos Moyá, Pat Rafter, Juan Carlos Ferrero, Marat Safin, Lleyton Hewitt, Andy Roddick, and Roger Federer (against whom he has a 2–9 record). Against other former world No. 1 players, Santoro is 0–6 against Yevgeny Kafelnikov, 0–1 against Ivan Lendl, 0–1 against Rafael Nadal, and 0–2 against Andy Murray. Santoro is famous for his winning record against Marat Safin (7–2); Safin himself has said, "Being told I would play Santoro was being told I was to die."

Santoro won the 2003 and 2004 Australian Opens doubles titles, partnering Michaël Llodra, a French compatriot, and was runner-up at the 2002 Australian Open, 2004 French Open and 2006 Wimbledon Championships. He also won the 2005 French Open mixed doubles title with Daniela Hantuchová. Santoro teamed with Michaël Llodra again to win the 2005 Tennis Masters Cup in Shanghai, a competition that included the top eight doubles teams in the world.

In addition to his doubles prowess, Fabrice is noted for his cheery attitude on court and his vast arsenal of trick shots, making him a crowd favourite and gaining him the admiration of his peers. In recognition of Santoro's varied and innovative style of play, Pete Sampras has nicknamed him The Magician.

Santoro plays with two hands on forehand and backhand, and though he is right-handed, often slices his forehand with his left hand. He attributes this to having used racquets of the same weight throughout his career, which were too heavy for a six-year-old starting off a career to hold with one hand. Santoro was fast around the court and was a skilled defensive player.

With his participation in the 2008 Australian Open, he broke Andre Agassi's record in Grand Slam appearances over his career with a total of 62. Santoro retired at the end of the 2009 season at his hometown tournament at the 2009 BNP Paribas Masters in Paris (Bercy), losing his final singles match against James Blake and his final doubles match against Johan Brunström and Jean-Julien Rojer while partnering with compatriot Sébastien Grosjean.

Santoro came out of retirement for one tournament at the 2010 Australian Open in order to obtain the record for having played in Grand Slam tournaments in four different decades, logging a total of 70 appearances in Grand Slam tournaments. At 37, he was the oldest player in the ATP top 100, being ranked 68 when he entered this last tournament. He lost in the first round of the tournament – to Marin Čilić – ending his professional tennis career.

He was the first leader of the ATP Champions Race, winning the first tournament of the year in Doha in the year the race was introduced (2000).

According to the ATP website, as of the 2019 Davis Cup Finals, Feliciano López has lost more singles matches (475) than any other professional player (active or not), surpassing the record previously held by Santoro. Overall, however, Santoro has won more than half of his matches, with a career record of 470–444.

== Personal life ==
Santoro was born in Tahiti and grew up in La Seyne-sur-Mer, in Southern France. His father worked at Toulon's military port and was a former footballer who later became a tennis teacher. Santoro began playing tennis as a child at the club where his father taught.

As of 2022, Santoro divides his time between Paris and Corsica. He owns a home near Ajaccio.

He is a big fan of the late French comedian Michel Colucci, better known as Coluche.

== Grand Slam finals ==
=== Doubles: 5 (2 titles, 3 runner-ups) ===
Result	Year	Championship	Surface	Partner	Opponents	Score
Loss	2002	Australian Open	Hard	(France) Michaël Llodra	(The Bahamas) Mark Knowles (Canada) Daniel Nestor	6–7^{(4–7)}, 3–6
Win	2003	Australian Open (1)	Hard	(France) Michaël Llodra	(The Bahamas) Mark Knowles (Canada) Daniel Nestor	6–4, 3–6, 6–3
Win	2004	Australian Open (2)	Hard	(France) Michaël Llodra	(United States) Bob Bryan (United States) Mike Bryan	7–6^{(7–4)}, 6–3
Loss	2004	French Open	Clay	(France) Michaël Llodra	(Belgium) Xavier Malisse (Belgium) Olivier Rochus	5–7, 5–7
Loss	2006	Wimbledon	Grass	(Serbia) Nenad Zimonjić	(United States) Bob Bryan (United States) Mike Bryan	3–6, 6–4, 4–6, 2–6

=== Mixed doubles: 1 title ===
Result	Year	Championship	Surface	Partner	Opponents	Score
Win	2005	French Open	Clay	(Slovakia) Daniela Hantuchová	(United States) Martina Navratilova (India) Leander Paes	3–6, 6–3, 6–2

== Career finals ==
=== Singles (6 titles, 6 runner-ups) ===
Legend (singles)
Grand Slam (0–0)
ATP Finals (0–0)
ATP Masters 1000 (0–0)
ATP World Tour 500 Series (1–0)
ATP World Tour 250 Series (5–6)

Result	W/L	Date	Tournament	Surface	Opponent	Score
Loss	0–1	Oct 1990	Toulouse, France	Hard (i)	(Sweden) Jonas Svensson	6–7^{(5–7)}, 2–6
Loss	0–2	Feb 1993	Dubai, United Arab Emirates	Hard	(Czech Republic) Karel Nováček	4–6, 5–7
Loss	0–3	Aug 1994	Kitzbühel, Austria	Clay	(Croatia) Goran Ivanišević	2–6, 6–4, 6–4, 3–6, 2–6
Win	1–3	Oct 1997	Lyon, France	Carpet (i)	(Germany) Tommy Haas	6–4, 6–4
Loss	1–4	Jan 1998	Doha, Qatar	Hard	(Czech Republic) Petr Korda	0–6, 3–6
Win	2–4	Feb 1999	Marseille, France	Hard (i)	(France) Arnaud Clément	6–3, 4–6, 6–4
Loss	2–5	Mar 1999	Copenhagen, Denmark	Hard (i)	(Sweden) Magnus Gustafsson	4–6, 1–6
Win	3–5	Jan 2000	Doha, Qatar	Hard	(Germany) Rainer Schüttler	3–6, 7–5, 3–0 retired
Loss	3–6	Jun 2001	Halle, Germany	Grass	(Sweden) Thomas Johansson	3–6, 7–6^{(7–5)}, 2–6
Win	4–6	Feb 2002	Dubai, United Arab Emirates	Hard	(Morocco) Younes El Aynaoui	6–4, 3–6, 6–3
Win	5–6	Jul 2007	Newport, United States	Grass	(France) Nicolas Mahut	6–4, 6–4
Win	6–6	Jul 2008	Newport, United States	Grass	(India) Prakash Amritraj	6–3, 7–5

=== Doubles (24 titles, 18 runner-ups) ===
Legend (doubles)
Grand Slam (2–3)
ATP Finals (1–1)
ATP Masters 1000 (3–7)
ATP World Tour 500 Series (3–1)
ATP World Tour 250 Series (15–6)

Result	W/L	Date	Tournament	Surface	Partner	Opponents	Score
Win	1.	Sep 1995	Palermo, Italy	Clay	(Spain) Álex Corretja	(Netherlands) Hendrik Jan Davids (South Africa) Piet Norval	6–7, 6–4, 6–3
Loss	1.	Feb 1997	Marseille, France	Hard (i)	(France) Olivier Delaître	(Sweden) Thomas Enqvist (Sweden) Magnus Larsson	3–6, 4–6
Loss	2.	Oct 1997	Lyon, France	Carpet (i)	(France) Olivier Delaître	(South Africa) Ellis Ferreira (United States) Patrick Galbraith	6–3, 2–6, 4–6
Loss	3.	Nov 1997	Moscow, Russia	Carpet (i)	(South Africa) David Adams	(Czech Republic) Martin Damm (Czech Republic) Cyril Suk	4–6, 3–6
Loss	4.	Jan 1998	Doha, Qatar	Hard	(France) Olivier Delaître	(India) Mahesh Bhupathi (India) Leander Paes	4–6, 6–3, 4–6
Win	2.	Jul 1998	Stuttgart, Germany	Clay	(France) Olivier Delaître	(Australia) Joshua Eagle (United States) Jim Grabb	6–1, 3–6, 6–3
Loss	5.	Aug 1998	Cincinnati, United States	Hard	(France) Olivier Delaître	(The Bahamas) Mark Knowles (Canada) Daniel Nestor	1–6, 1–2 retired
Win	3.	Sep 1998	Toulouse, France	Hard (i)	(France) Olivier Delaître	(Netherlands) Paul Haarhuis (Netherlands) Jan Siemerink	6–2, 6–4
Win	4.	Oct 1998	Basel, Switzerland	Hard (i)	(France) Olivier Delaître	(South Africa) Piet Norval (Zimbabwe) Kevin Ullyett	6–3, 7–6
Win	5.	Oct 1998	Lyon, France	Carpet (i)	(France) Olivier Delaître	(Spain) Tomás Carbonell (Spain) Francisco Roig	6–2, 6–2
Win	6.	Aug 1999	Long Island, United States	Hard	(France) Olivier Delaître	(United States) Jan-Michael Gambill (United States) Scott Humphries	7–5, 6–4
Win	7.	Oct 2000	Toulouse, France	Hard (i)	(France) Julien Boutter	(United States) Donald Johnson (South Africa) Piet Norval	7–6^{(10–8)}, 4–6, 7–6^{(7–5)}
Win	8.	Feb 2001	Marseille, France	Hard (i)	(France) Julien Boutter	(Australia) Michael Hill (United States) Jeff Tarango	7–6^{(9–7)}, 7–5
Loss	6.	Jan 2002	Melbourne, Australia	Hard	(France) Michaël Llodra	(The Bahamas) Mark Knowles (Canada) Daniel Nestor	6–7^{(4–7)}, 3–6
Win	9.	Oct 2002	Paris, France	Carpet (i)	(France) Nicolas Escudé	(Brazil) Gustavo Kuerten (France) Cédric Pioline	6–3, 7–6^{(8–6)}
Win	10.	Jan 2003	Melbourne, Australia	Hard	(France) Michaël Llodra	(The Bahamas) Mark Knowles (Canada) Daniel Nestor	6–4, 3–6, 6–3
Win	11.	Feb 2003	Marseille, France	Hard (i)	(France) Sébastien Grosjean	(Czech Republic) Tomáš Cibulec (Czech Republic) Pavel Vízner	6–1, 6–4
Loss	7.	Apr 2003	Monte Carlo, Monaco	Clay	(France) Michaël Llodra	(India) Mahesh Bhupathi (Belarus) Max Mirnyi	4–6, 6–3, 6–7^{(6–8)}
Loss	8.	May 2003	Rome, Italy	Clay	(France) Michaël Llodra	(Australia) Wayne Arthurs (Australia) Paul Hanley	1–6, 3–6
Loss	9.	Sep 2003	Metz, France	Hard (i)	(France) Michaël Llodra	(France) Julien Benneteau (France) Nicolas Mahut	6–7^{(2–7)}, 3–6
Loss	10.	Oct 2003	Paris, France	Carpet (i)	(France) Michaël Llodra	(Australia) Wayne Arthurs (Australia) Paul Hanley	3–6, 6–1, 3–6
Loss	11.	Nov 2003	Houston, United States	Hard	(France) Michaël Llodra	(United States) Bob Bryan (United States) Mike Bryan	7–6^{(8–6)}, 3–6, 6–3, 6–7^{(3–7)}, 4–6
Win	12.	Jan 2004	Auckland, New Zealand	Hard	(India) Mahesh Bhupathi	(Czech Republic) Jiří Novák (Czech Republic) Radek Štěpánek	4–6, 7–5, 6–3
Win	13.	Jan 2004	Melbourne, Australia	Hard	(France) Michaël Llodra	(United States) Bob Bryan (United States) Mike Bryan	7–6^{(7–4)}, 6–3
Win	14.	Mar 2004	Dubai, UAE	Hard	(India) Mahesh Bhupathi	(Sweden) Jonas Björkman (India) Leander Paes	6–2, 4–6, 6–4
Loss	12.	May 2004	French Open, France	Clay	(France) Michaël Llodra	(Belgium) Xavier Malisse (Belgium) Olivier Rochus	5–7, 5–7
Loss	13.	Feb 2005	Dubai, UAE	Hard	(Sweden) Jonas Björkman	(Czech Republic) Martin Damm (Czech Republic) Radek Štěpánek	2–6, 4–6
Win	15.	May 2005	Rome, Italy	Clay	(France) Michaël Llodra	(United States) Bob Bryan (United States) Mike Bryan	6–4, 6–2
Loss	14.	May 2005	Hamburg, Germany	Clay	(France) Michaël Llodra	(Sweden) Jonas Björkman (Belarus) Max Mirnyi	6–4, 6–7^{(2–7)}, 6–7^{(3–7)}
Win	16.	Oct 2005	Metz, France	Hard (i)	(France) Michaël Llodra	(Argentina) José Acasuso (Argentina) Sebastián Prieto	5–2, 3–5, 5–4
Win	17.	Oct 2005	Lyon, France	Carpet (i)	(France) Michaël Llodra	(South Africa) Jeff Coetzee (Netherlands) Rogier Wassen	6–3, 6–1
Win	18.	Nov 2005	Shanghai, China	Carpet (i)	(France) Michaël Llodra	(India) Leander Paes (Serbia and Montenegro) Nenad Zimonjić	6–7^{(6–8)}, 6–3, 7–6^{(7–4)}
Win	19.	Jan 2006	Sydney, Australia	Hard	(Serbia) Nenad Zimonjić	(Czech Republic) František Čermák (Czech Republic) Leoš Friedl	6–1, 6–4
Loss	15.	Apr 2006	Monte Carlo, Monaco	Clay	(Serbia) Nenad Zimonjić	(Sweden) Jonas Björkman (Belarus) Max Mirnyi	2–6, 6–7^{(2–7)}
Win	20.	Jun 2006	Halle, Germany	Grass	(Serbia) Nenad Zimonjić	(Germany) Michael Kohlmann (Germany) Rainer Schüttler	6–0, 6–4
Loss	16.	Jun 2006	Wimbledon, UK	Grass	(Serbia) Nenad Zimonjić	(United States) Bob Bryan (United States) Mike Bryan	3–6, 6–4, 4–6, 2–6
Win	21.	Oct 2006	Metz, France	Hard (i)	(France) Richard Gasquet	(Austria) Julian Knowle (Austria) Jürgen Melzer	3–6, 6–1, [11–9]
Win	22.	Oct 2006	Moscow, Russia	Carpet (i)	(Serbia) Nenad Zimonjić	(Czech Republic) František Čermák (Czech Republic) Jaroslav Levinský	6–1, 7–5
Loss	17.	Oct 2006	Paris, France	Carpet (i)	(Serbia) Nenad Zimonjić	(France) Arnaud Clément (France) Michaël Llodra	6–7^{(4–7)}, 2–6
Win	23.	Feb 2007	Dubai, UAE	Hard	(Serbia) Nenad Zimonjić	(India) Mahesh Bhupathi (Czech Republic) Radek Štěpánek	7–5, 6–7^{(3–7)}, [10–7]
Win	24.	May 2007	Rome, Italy	Clay	(Serbia) Nenad Zimonjić	(United States) Bob Bryan (United States) Mike Bryan	6–4, 6–7^{(4–7)}, [10–7]
Loss	18.	Jun 2007	Halle, Germany	Grass	(Serbia) Nenad Zimonjić	(Sweden) Simon Aspelin (Austria) Julian Knowle	4–6, 6–7^{(5–7)}

== Performance timelines ==
Key
W	F	SF	QF	#R	RR	Q#	DNQ	A	NH

(W) winner; (F) finalist; (SF) semifinalist; (QF) quarterfinalist; (#R) rounds 4, 3, 2, 1; (RR) round-robin stage; (Q#) qualification round; (DNQ) did not qualify; (A) absent; (NH) not held; (SR) strike rate (events won / competed); (W–L) win–loss record.

=== Singles ===
Name	1989	1990	1991	1992	1993	1994	1995	1996	1997	1998	1999	2000	2001	2002	2003	2004	2005	2006	2007	2008	2009	2010	SR	W–L
Grand Slam events
Australian Open	A	A	1R	A	2R	3R	2R	1R	A	3R	4R	1R	2R	1R	3R	2R	1R	QF	3R	2R	3R	1R	0 / 18	22–18
French Open	1R	2R	4R	1R	1R	3R	1R	A	1R	3R	1R	2R	4R	2R	2R	3R	1R	1R	1R	2R	1R	A	0 / 20	17–20
Wimbledon	A	1R	A	A	A	A	1R	A	1R	A	2R	2R	3R	2R	2R	2R	2R	2R	2R	1R	2R	A	0 / 14	11–14
US Open	A	3R	1R	2R	1R	A	1R	A	1R	3R	3R	1R	2R	1R	2R	3R	2R	1R	2R	1R	1R	A	0 / 18	13–18
Win–loss	0–1	3–3	3–3	1–2	1–3	4–2	1–4	0–1	0–3	6–3	6–4	2–4	7–4	2–4	5–4	6–4	2–4	5–4	4–4	2–4	3–4	0–1	0 / 70	63–70
Masters Series
Indian Wells	NME	A	3R	1R	QF	3R	2R	A	A	1R	A	3R	2R	3R	1R	1R	4R	1R	A	A	A	A	0 / 13	16–13
Miami	NME	2R	2R	1R	3R	A	A	A	A	4R	3R	2R	4R	2R	A	1R	A	2R	3R	3R	2R	A	0 / 14	15–14
Monte Carlo	NME	1R	2R	2R	1R	A	3R	3R	SF	QF	A	2R	1R	1R	1R	3R	2R	1R	A	1R	A	A	0 / 16	17–16
Rome	NME	A	QF	3R	3R	A	3R	A	2R	1R	3R	3R	2R	1R	1R	A	2R	3R	A	1R	A	A	0 / 14	18–14
Hamburg	NME	2R	A	A	A	A	1R	A	A	QF	2R	1R	QF	1R	1R	A	1R	1R	A	A	NME	NME	0 / 10	8–10
Canada	NME	A	A	A	A	A	A	A	QF	2R	QF	1R	SF	QF	1R	QF	1R	1R	A	A	A	A	0 / 10	17–10
Cincinnati	NME	A	A	A	A	A	A	A	2R	1R	2R	QF	2R	1R	2R	QF	2R	1R	A	A	A	A	0 / 10	11–10
Stuttgart/Madrid	NME	A	A	A	A	A	A	A	3R	1R	2R	2R	1R	SF	A	A	A	A	1R	A	A	A	0 / 7	8–7
Paris	NME	1R	1R	1R	A	A	A	A	2R	2R	2R	QF	2R	1R	2R	A	2R	1R	3R	A	1R	A	0 / 14	10–14
Win–loss	N/A	2–4	7–5	3–5	6–4	2–1	5–4	2–1	12–6	10–9	10–7	12–9	13–9	9–9	2–7	8–5	7–7	3–8	4–3	2–3	1–2	0–0	0 / 108	120–108
Year-end ranking	235	62	43	43	55	46	102	118	29	41	34	31	22	35	62	52	58	52	37	52	68	–		

=== Doubles ===
Tournament	1988	1989	1990	1991	1992	1993	1994	1995	1996	1997	1998	1999	2000	2001	2002	2003	2004	2005	2006	2007	2008	2009	SR	W–L
Grand Slam events
Australian Open	A	A	A	A	A	A	A	A	2R	A	3R	3R	1R	1R	F	W	W	QF	3R	QF	QF	1R	2 / 13	33–11
French Open	A	A	1R	1R	1R	1R	1R	3R	A	3R	A	2R	3R	2R	2R	3R	F	2R	1R	SF	1R	1R	0 / 18	21–17
Wimbledon	A	A	A	A	A	A	A	A	A	2R	A	SF	3R	2R	1R	3R	A	A	F	SF	1R	1R	0 / 10	19–10
US Open	A	A	A	A	A	A	A	A	A	1R	1R	2R	2R	1R	2R	SF	2R	1R	QF	1R	A	2R	0 / 12	12–11
Win–loss	0–0	0–0	0–1	0–1	0–1	0–1	0–1	2–1	1–1	3–3	2–2	8–3	5–4	2–3	7–4	14–3	12–2	4–3	10–4	11–4	3–3	1–4	2 / 53	85–49
Masters Series
Indian Wells	NME		A	A	A	A	A	A	A	A	2R	A	1R	A	2R	2R	1R	2R	QF	A	A	A	0 / 7	5–7
Miami	NME		A	A	A	A	A	A	A	A	2R	2R	2R	1R	3R	A	QF	A	2R	SF	2R	A	0 / 9	9–9
Monte Carlo	NME		A	A	A	A	A	A	A	2R	2R	A	1R	1R	2R	F	2R	SF	F	2R	1R	A	0 / 11	12–11
Rome	NME		A	A	A	A	A	1R	A	2R	A	SF	1R	1R	2R	F	QF	W	QF	W	SF	A	2 / 12	21–10
Hamburg	NME		A	A	A	A	A	2R	A	A	2R	SF	1R	2R	1R	A	A	F	SF	A	A	NME	0 / 8	10–8
Canada	NME		A	A	A	A	A	A	A	2R	2R	QF	A	2R	1R	QF	SF	A	QF	A	A	A	0 / 8	8–7
Cincinnati	NME		A	A	A	A	A	A	A	SF	F	2R	1R	A	1R	QF	QF	SF	QF	A	A	A	0 / 9	11–9
Stuttgart/Madrid	NME		A	A	A	A	A	A	A	A	SF	2R	A	A	QF	A	A	SF	QF	1R	A	A	0 / 6	7–5
Paris	NME		A	A	A	A	A	A	2R	1R	2R	2R	2R	1R	W	F	A	1R	F	2R	A	1R	1 / 12	13–10
Win–loss	N/A		0–0	0–0	0–0	0–0	0–0	1–2	1–1	6–5	12–8	6–7	1–6	2–5	11–7	11–6	6–6	13–6	15–9	7–4	4–3	0–1	3 / 82	96–76
Year-end ranking	997	773	195	363	1009	1118	184	125	147	35	18	34	60	91	18	9	11	10	10	20	75	165		

== Wins over top 10 players ==
#	Player	Rank	Event	Surface	Rd	Score	Rank
1990
1.	(Ecuador) Andrés Gómez	5	Toulouse, France	Hard (i)	1R	6–2, 3–6, 6–3	85
1991
2.	(Croatia) Goran Ivanišević	7	Indian Wells, United States	Hard	2R	6–0, 6–2	56
3.	(United States) Pete Sampras	6	Rome, Italy	Clay	2R	6–2, 4–6, 7–5	73
4.	(United States) Andre Agassi	6	Indianapolis, United States	Hard	3R	2–6, 7–5, 6–2	40
1992
5.	(Germany) Michael Stich	5	Rome, Italy	Clay	1R	5–7, 2–1, retired	48
6.	(Czech Republic) Petr Korda	5	Gstaad, Switzerland	Clay	2R	1–6, 7–5, 6–2	54
7.	(Germany) Boris Becker	5	Olympics, Barcelona	Clay	3R	6–1, 3–6, 6–1, 6–3	37
8.	(Czech Republic) Petr Korda	8	New Haven, United States	Hard	QF	7–6^{(8–6)}, 4–6, 6–3	44
1993
9.	(Germany) Michael Stich	10	Indian Wells, United States	Hard	2R	3–6, 7–6^{(9–7)}, 7–6^{(7–5)}	27
1995
10.	(United States) Pete Sampras	2	Rome, Italy	Clay	1R	6–4, 6–3	39
1997
11.	(Austria) Thomas Muster	2	Monte Carlo, Monaco	Clay	2R	6–2, 7–6^{(7–3)}	90
12.	(Chile) Marcelo Ríos	8	Prague, Czech Republic	Clay	QF	4–6, 6–3, 6–0	69
13.	(Austria) Thomas Muster	5	Montreal, Canada	Hard	3R	6–2, 2–6, 6–4	50
14.	(Spain) Sergi Bruguera	8	Stuttgart, Germany	Carpet (i)	2R	7–5, 7–6^{(11–9)}	33
1998
15.	(United Kingdom) Greg Rusedski	6	Doha, Qatar	Hard	QF	6–2, 3–6, 6–3	29
16.	(United States) Pete Sampras	2	Monte Carlo, Monaco	Clay	3R	6–1, 6–1	25
2000
17.	(Germany) Nicolas Kiefer	6	Doha, Qatar	Hard	SF	7–5, 6–4	34
18.	(Germany) Nicolas Kiefer	4	Indian Wells, United States	Hard	1R	6–1, 6–4	33
19.	(United Kingdom) Tim Henman	10	Rome, Italy	Clay	2R	7–6^{(7–5)}, 4–6, 6–4	28
20.	(Australia) Lleyton Hewitt	9	Cincinnati, United States	Hard	1R	4–6, 6–4, 6–4	37
21.	(Russia) Marat Safin	6	Cincinnati, United States	Hard	3R	6–1, 7–6^{(7–3)}	37
22.	(Russia) Marat Safin	2	Olympics, Sydney	Hard	1R	1–6, 6–1, 6–4	35
23.	(Sweden) Magnus Norman	4	Paris, France	Hard (i)	2R	6–2, 6–4	37
2001
24.	(United Kingdom) Tim Henman	9	Miami, United States	Hard	2R	4–6, 7–6^{(7–4)}, 6–3	52
25.	(United States) Andre Agassi	3	Hamburg, Germany	Clay	2R	6–3, 5–7, 6–4	52
26.	(Russia) Marat Safin	2	Roland Garros, Paris, France	Clay	3R	6–4, 6–4, 4–6, 0–6, 6–1	43
27.	(France) Sébastien Grosjean	8	Halle, Germany	Grass	2R	7–5, 7–5	33
28.	(Australia) Patrick Rafter	10	Halle, Germany	Grass	SF	7–5, 6–4	33
2002
29.	(France) Sébastien Grosjean	9	Dubai, United Arab Emirates	Hard	2R	6–2, 7–5	26
30.	(France) Sébastien Grosjean	7	Indian Wells, United States	Hard	1R	6–3, 4–6, 7–5	20
31.	(Germany) Tommy Haas	3	Madrid, Spain	Hard (i)	2R	7–6^{(9–7)}, 4–1, retired	50
32.	(Switzerland) Roger Federer	7	Madrid, Spain	Hard (i)	QF	7–5, 6–3	50
2003
33.	(Spain) Carlos Moyá	7	Cincinnati, United States	Hard	1R	3–6, 6–3, 6–4	60
2004
34.	(Spain) Juan Carlos Ferrero	7	Toronto, Canada	Hard	1R	3–2, retired	58
35.	(Australia) Lleyton Hewitt	10	Toronto, Canada	Hard	3R	2–6, 6–3, 6–4	58
2005
36.	(Argentina) David Nalbandian	10	Rome, Italy	Clay	1R	6–4, 1–6, 6–4	54
37.	(Argentina) Gastón Gaudio	10	Australian Open, Melbourne	Hard	3R	6–3, 6–2, 5–7, 1–6, 6–4	65
2007
38.	(Spain) Tommy Robredo	7	Dubai, United Arab Emirates	Hard	1R	7–6^{(8–6)}, 6–4	63
39.	(United States) Andy Roddick	5	Lyon, France	Carpet (i)	1R	7–6^{(7–5)}, 2–6, 6–4	46
40.	(Serbia) Novak Djokovic	3	Paris, France	Hard (i)	2R	6–3, 6–2	39
