= Open Sud de France =

Open Occitanie

ATP Tour
- Founded: 1987
- Editions: 38 (2025)
- Location: Montpellier; France
- Venue: Palais des Sports de Gerland (1987-2009); Sud de France Arena (2010-current)
- Category: ATP World Series (1990–1997); ATP International Series (1998–2008); ATP Tour 250 (2009–current)
- Surface: Hard (Indoor)
- Draw: 28S / 16Q / 16D
- Prize money: €612,620 (2026)
- Website: Website

Current champions (2026)
- Singles: (Canada) Félix Auger-Aliassime
- Doubles: (France) Théo Arribagé (France) Albano Olivetti

The Open Occitanie (formerly known as the Open Sud de France and Grand Prix de Tennis de Lyon) is a professional tennis tournament played on indoor hardcourts. It is currently part of the ATP Tour 250 series of the ATP Tour. Founded in 1987, it was held annually in October at the Palais des Sports de Gerland in Lyon until 2009, before being relocated at the Arena Montpellier in 2010. There was no event in 2011 as the tournament moved to a January slot in 2012.

The current venue now called Sud de France Arena holds 10,000 spectators for tennis events. Since 2026 the tournament is one of two French events of the ATP Tour 250 series. Until 2026 it was one of three ATP 250 events, along with the Open 13 and the Moselle Open and one of four with the Lyon Open until 2025.

== History ==
In 1905 the Lyon Covered Court Championships were founded. It was an indoor wood court tennis tournament played at the Tennis Club of Lyon.

In 1951 its name was changed to the Georges Cozon International Cup also known as the Lyon International Indoor. It was a combined tennis event until 1972 when the women's event ended. It continued to be staged annually in Lyon until 1986. In 1987 it was succeeded by the Lyon Tennis Grand Prix or Grand Prix de Tennis de Lyon.

== Finals ==
=== Singles ===
Location	Year	Champions	Runners-up	Score
Lyon	1987	(France) Yannick Noah	(Sweden) Joakim Nyström	6–4, 7–5
Lyon	1988	(Senegal) Yahiya Doumbia	(United States) Todd Nelson	6–4, 3–6, 6–3
Lyon	1989	(United States) John McEnroe	(Switzerland) Jakob Hlasek	6–3, 7–6
Lyon	1990	(Switzerland) Marc Rosset	(Sweden) Mats Wilander	6–3, 6–2
Lyon	1991	(United States) Pete Sampras	(France) Olivier Delaître	6–1, 6–1
Lyon	1992	(United States) Pete Sampras (2)	(France) Cédric Pioline	6–4, 6–2
Lyon	1993	(United States) Pete Sampras (3)	(France) Cédric Pioline	7–6^{(7–5)}, 1–6, 7–5
Lyon	1994	(Switzerland) Marc Rosset (2)	(United States) Jim Courier	6–4, 7–6^{(7–2)}
Lyon	1995	(South Africa) Wayne Ferreira	(United States) Pete Sampras	7–6^{(7–2)}, 5–7, 6–3
Lyon	1996	(Russia) Yevgeny Kafelnikov	(France) Arnaud Boetsch	7–5, 6–3
Lyon	1997	(France) Fabrice Santoro	(Germany) Tommy Haas	6–4, 6–4
Lyon	1998	(Spain) Àlex Corretja	(Germany) Tommy Haas	2–6, 7–6^{(8–6)}, 6–1
Lyon	1999	(Ecuador) Nicolás Lapentti	(Australia) Lleyton Hewitt	6–3, 6–2
Lyon	2000	(France) Arnaud Clément	(Australia) Patrick Rafter	7–6^{(7–2)}, 7–6^{(7–5)}
Lyon	2001	(Croatia) Ivan Ljubičić	(Morocco) Younes El Aynaoui	6–3, 6–2
Lyon	2002	(France) Paul-Henri Mathieu	(Brazil) Gustavo Kuerten	4–6, 6–3, 6–1
Lyon	2003	(Germany) Rainer Schüttler	(France) Arnaud Clément	7–5, 6–3
Lyon	2004	(Sweden) Robin Söderling	(Belgium) Xavier Malisse	6–2, 3–6, 6–4
Lyon	2005	(United States) Andy Roddick	(France) Gaël Monfils	6–3, 6–2
Lyon	2006	(France) Richard Gasquet	(France) Marc Gicquel	6–3, 6–1
Lyon	2007	(France) Sébastien Grosjean	(France) Marc Gicquel	7–6^{(7–5)}, 6–4
Lyon	2008	(Sweden) Robin Söderling (2)	(France) Julien Benneteau	6–3, 6–7^{(5–7)}, 6–1
Lyon	2009	(Croatia) Ivan Ljubičić (2)	(France) Michaël Llodra	7–5, 6–3
Montpellier	2010	(France) Gaël Monfils	(Croatia) Ivan Ljubičić	6–2, 5–7, 6–1
Montpellier	2011	Not held		
Montpellier	2012	(Czech Republic) Tomáš Berdych	(France) Gaël Monfils	6–2, 4–6, 6–3
Montpellier	2013	(France) Richard Gasquet (2)	(France) Benoît Paire	6–2, 6–3
Montpellier	2014	(France) Gaël Monfils (2)	(France) Richard Gasquet	6–4, 6–4
Montpellier	2015	(France) Richard Gasquet (3)	(Poland) Jerzy Janowicz	3–0, ret.
Montpellier	2016	(France) Richard Gasquet (4)	(France) Paul-Henri Mathieu	7–5, 6–4
Montpellier	2017	(Germany) Alexander Zverev	(France) Richard Gasquet	7–6^{(7–4)}, 6–3
Montpellier	2018	(France) Lucas Pouille	(France) Richard Gasquet	7–6^{(7–4)}, 6–4
Montpellier	2019	(France) Jo-Wilfried Tsonga	(France) Pierre-Hugues Herbert	6–4, 6–2
Montpellier	2020	(France) Gaël Monfils (3)	(Canada) Vasek Pospisil	7–5, 6–3
Montpellier	2021	(Belgium) David Goffin	(Spain) Roberto Bautista Agut	5–7, 6–4, 6–2
Montpellier	2022	(Kazakhstan) Alexander Bublik	(Germany) Alexander Zverev	6–4, 6–3
Montpellier	2023	(Italy) Jannik Sinner	(United States) Maxime Cressy	7–6^{(7–3)}, 6–3
Montpellier	2024	(Kazakhstan) Alexander Bublik (2)	(Croatia) Borna Ćorić	5–7, 6–2, 6–3
Montpellier	2025	(Canada) Félix Auger-Aliassime	(United States) Aleksandar Kovacevic	6–2, 6–7^{(7–9)}, 7–6^{(7–2)}
Montpellier	2026	(Canada) Félix Auger-Aliassime (2)	(France) Adrian Mannarino	6–3, 7–6^{(7–4)}

=== Doubles ===
Location	Year	Champions	Runners-up	Score
Lyon	1987	(France) Guy Forget (France) Yannick Noah	(United States) Kelly Jones (United States) David Pate	4–6, 6–3, 6–4
Lyon	1988	(Australia) Brad Drewett (Australia) Broderick Dyke	(Denmark) Michael Mortensen (United States) Blaine Willenborg	3–6, 6–3, 6–4
Lyon	1989	(West Germany) Eric Jelen (Denmark) Michael Mortensen	(Switzerland) Jakob Hlasek (United States) John McEnroe	6–2, 3–6, 6–3
Lyon	1990	(United States) Patrick Galbraith (United States) Kelly Jones	(United States) Jim Grabb (United States) David Pate	7–6, 6–4
Lyon	1991	(Netherlands) Tom Nijssen (Czech Republic) Cyril Suk	(United States) Steve DeVries (Australia) David Macpherson	7–6, 6–3
Lyon	1992	(Switzerland) Jakob Hlasek (Switzerland) Marc Rosset	(United Kingdom) Neil Broad (South Africa) Stefan Kruger	6–1, 6–3
Lyon	1993	(South Africa) Gary Muller (South Africa) Danie Visser	(South Africa) John-Laffnie de Jager (South Africa) Stefan Kruger	6–3, 7–6
Lyon	1994	(Switzerland) Jakob Hlasek (2) (Russia) Yevgeny Kafelnikov	(Czech Republic) Martin Damm (Australia) Patrick Rafter	6–7, 7–6, 7–6
Lyon	1995	(Switzerland) Jakob Hlasek (3) (Russia) Yevgeny Kafelnikov (2)	(South Africa) John-Laffnie de Jager (South Africa) Wayne Ferreira	6–3, 6–3
Lyon	1996	(United States) Jim Grabb (United States) Richey Reneberg	(United Kingdom) Neil Broad (South Africa) Piet Norval	6–2, 6–1
Lyon	1997	(South Africa) Ellis Ferreira (United States) Patrick Galbraith	(France) Olivier Delaître (France) Fabrice Santoro	3–6, 6–2, 6–4
Lyon	1998	(France) Olivier Delaître (France) Fabrice Santoro	(Spain) Tomás Carbonell (Spain) Francisco Roig	6–2, 6–2
Lyon	1999	(South Africa) Piet Norval (Zimbabwe) Kevin Ullyett	(South Africa) Wayne Ferreira (Australia) Sandon Stolle	4–6, 7–6^{(7–5)}, 7–6^{(7–4)}
Lyon	2000	(Netherlands) Paul Haarhuis (Australia) Sandon Stolle	(Croatia) Ivan Ljubičić (United States) Jack Waite	6–1, 6–7^{(2–7)}, 7–6^{(9–7)}
Lyon	2001	(Canada) Daniel Nestor (Federal Republic of Yugoslavia) Nenad Zimonjić	(France) Arnaud Clément (France) Sébastien Grosjean	6–1, 6–2
Lyon	2002	(Zimbabwe) Wayne Black (Zimbabwe) Kevin Ullyett (2)	(The Bahamas) Mark Knowles (Canada) Daniel Nestor	6–4, 3–6, 7–6^{(7–3)}
Lyon	2003	(Israel) Jonathan Erlich (Israel) Andy Ram	(France) Julien Benneteau (France) Nicolas Mahut	6–1, 6–3
Lyon	2004	(Israel) Jonathan Erlich (2) (Israel) Andy Ram (2)	(Sweden) Jonas Björkman (Czech Republic) Radek Štěpánek	7–6^{(7–2)}, 6–2
Lyon	2005	(France) Michaël Llodra (France) Fabrice Santoro (2)	(South Africa) Jeff Coetzee (Netherlands) Rogier Wassen	6–3, 6–1
Lyon	2006	(France) Julien Benneteau (France) Arnaud Clément	(Czech Republic) František Čermák (Czech Republic) Jaroslav Levinský	6–2, 6–7^{(3–7)}, [10–7]
Lyon	2007	(France) Sébastien Grosjean (France) Jo-Wilfried Tsonga	(Poland) Łukasz Kubot (Croatia) Lovro Zovko	6–4, 6–3
Lyon	2008	(France) Michaël Llodra (2) (Israel) Andy Ram (3)	(Australia) Stephen Huss (United Kingdom) Ross Hutchins	6–3, 5–7, [10–8]
Lyon	2009	(France) Julien Benneteau (2) (France) Nicolas Mahut	(France) Arnaud Clément (France) Sébastien Grosjean	6–4, 7–6^{(8–6)}
Montpellier	2010	(Australia) Stephen Huss (United Kingdom) Ross Hutchins	(Spain) Marc López (Argentina) Eduardo Schwank	6–2, 4–6, [10–7]
Montpellier	2011	Not held		
Montpellier	2012	(France) Nicolas Mahut (2) (France) Édouard Roger-Vasselin	(Australia) Paul Hanley (United Kingdom) Jamie Murray	6–4, 7–6^{(7–4)}
Montpellier	2013	(France) Marc Gicquel (France) Michaël Llodra (3)	(Sweden) Johan Brunström (South Africa) Raven Klaasen	6–3, 3–6, [11-9]
Montpellier	2014	(Russia) Nikolay Davydenko (Uzbekistan) Denis Istomin	(France) Marc Gicquel (France) Nicolas Mahut	6–4, 1–6, [10–7]
Montpellier	2015	(New Zealand) Marcus Daniell (New Zealand) Artem Sitak	(United Kingdom) Dominic Inglot (Romania) Florin Mergea	3–6, 6–4, [16–14]
Montpellier	2016	(Croatia) Mate Pavić (New Zealand) Michael Venus	(Germany) Alexander Zverev (Germany) Mischa Zverev	7–5, 7–6^{(7–4)}
Montpellier	2017	(Germany) Alexander Zverev (Germany) Mischa Zverev	(France) Fabrice Martin (Canada) Daniel Nestor	6–4, 6–7^{(7–3)}, [10–7]
Montpellier	2018	(United Kingdom) Ken Skupski (United Kingdom) Neal Skupski	(Japan) Ben McLachlan (France) Hugo Nys	7–6^{(7–2)}, 6–4
Montpellier	2019	(Croatia) Ivan Dodig (France) Édouard Roger-Vasselin (2)	(France) Benjamin Bonzi (France) Antoine Hoang	6–4, 6–3
Montpellier	2020	(Serbia) Nikola Ćaćić (Croatia) Mate Pavić (2)	(United Kingdom) Dominic Inglot (Pakistan) Aisam-ul-Haq Qureshi	6–4, 6–7^{(4–7)}, [10–4]
Montpellier	2021	(Finland) Henri Kontinen (France) Édouard Roger-Vasselin (3)	(Israel) Jonathan Erlich (Belarus) Andrei Vasilevski	6–2, 7–5
Montpellier	2022	(France) Pierre-Hugues Herbert (France) Nicolas Mahut (3)	(United Kingdom) Lloyd Glasspool (Finland) Harri Heliövaara	4–6, 7–6^{(7–3)}, [12–10]
Montpellier	2023	(Netherlands) Robin Haase (Netherlands) Matwé Middelkoop	(United States) Maxime Cressy (France) Albano Olivetti	7–6^{(7–4)}, 4–6, [10–6]
Montpellier	2024	(France) Sadio Doumbia (France) Fabien Reboul	(France) Albano Olivetti (Austria) Sam Weissborn	6–7^{(5–7)}, 6–4, [10–6]
Montpellier	2025	(Netherlands) Robin Haase (2) (Netherlands) Botic van de Zandschulp	(Netherlands) Tallon Griekspoor (Netherlands) Bart Stevens	6–7^{(7–9)}, 6–3, [10–5]
Montpellier	2026	(France) Théo Arribagé (France) Albano Olivetti	(Germany) Constantin Frantzen (Netherlands) Robin Haase	7–6^{(8–6)}, 6–1

== See also ==
- Lyon Open
