= 1992 Lyon Grand Prix – Doubles =

Doubles
- 1992 Lyon Grand Prix

Final
- Champions: (Switzerland) Jakob Hlasek (Switzerland) Marc Rosset
- Runners-up: (United Kingdom) Neil Broad (South Africa) Stefan Kruger
- Score: 6–1, 6–3

Details
- Draw: 16
- Seeds: 4

Events
Singles	Doubles
← 1991 ·	Lyon Grand Prix	· 1993 →

Tom Nijssen and Cyril Suk were the defending champions, but lost in the semifinals this year.

Jakob Hlasek and Marc Rosset won the title, defeating Neil Broad and Stefan Kruger 6–1, 6–3 in the final.

== Seeds ==
1. (Switzerland) Jakob Hlasek / (Switzerland) Marc Rosset (champions)
2. (Netherlands) Tom Nijssen / (Czech Republic) Cyril Suk (semifinals)
3. (United States) Steve DeVries / (Australia) David Macpherson (first round)
4. (Australia) Mark Kratzmann / (Australia) Wally Masur (semifinals)

== Draw ==
=== Key ===
- Q = Qualifier
- WC = Wild card
- LL = Lucky loser
- Alt = Alternate
- SE = Special exempt
- PR = Protected ranking
- ITF = ITF entry
- JE = Junior exempt
- w/o = Walkover
- r = Retired
- d = Defaulted
- SR = Special ranking

=== Draw ===
First round
1	(Switzerland) J Hlasek (Switzerland) M Rosset	6	7
(South Africa) J-L de Jager (Latvia) Ģ Dzelde	3	5
(France) G Forget (France) H Leconte	7	7
(United States) M Briggs (United States) T Kronemann	6	5
4	(Australia) M Kratzmann (Australia) W Masur	6	7	6
Q	(South Africa) J de Beer (South Africa) R Koenig	7	6	4
WC	(France) A Boetsch (France) O Delaître	7	7
WC	(United States) P McEnroe (United States) P Sampras	6	6
(United States) S Cannon (United States) G Van Emburgh	7	6
(South Africa) P Norval (Czechoslovakia) K Nováček	6	2
(United Kingdom) N Broad (South Africa) S Kruger	6	7
3	(United States) S DeVries (Australia) D Macpherson	4	5
(United States) M Keil (United States) D Randall	4	6	7
(Netherlands) HJ Davids (Belgium) L Pimek	6	3	6
(United States) B Pearce (South Africa) B Talbot	4	0
2	(Netherlands) T Nijssen (Czech Republic) C Suk	6	6

Quarterfinals
1	(Switzerland) J Hlasek (Switzerland) M Rosset	6	3	7
(France) G Forget (France) H Leconte	4	6	6
4	(Australia) M Kratzmann (Australia) W Masur	6	6
WC	(France) A Boetsch (France) O Delaître	3	4
(United States) S Cannon (United States) G Van Emburgh	3	4
(United Kingdom) N Broad (South Africa) S Kruger	6	6
(United States) M Keil (United States) D Randall	2	6
2	(Netherlands) T Nijssen (Czech Republic) C Suk	6	7

Semifinals
1	(Switzerland) J Hlasek (Switzerland) M Rosset	7	6
4	(Australia) M Kratzmann (Australia) W Masur	5	3
(United Kingdom) N Broad (South Africa) S Kruger	7	7
2	(Netherlands) T Nijssen (Czech Republic) C Suk	6	6

Final
1	(Switzerland) J Hlasek (Switzerland) M Rosset	6	6
(United Kingdom) N Broad (South Africa) S Kruger	1	3
