= 1990 Grand Prix de Tennis de Lyon – Singles =

Singles
- 1990 Grand Prix de Tennis de Lyon

Final
- Champion: (Switzerland) Marc Rosset
- Runner-up: (Sweden) Mats Wilander
- Score: 6–3, 6–2

Details
- Draw: 32
- Seeds: 8

Events
| Singles | Doubles |
| ← 1989 · | Grand Prix de Tennis de Lyon | · 1991 → |

The 1990 Grand Prix de Tennis de Lyon – Singles was an event of the 1990 Grand Prix de Tennis de Lyon men's tennis tournament that was played at the Palais des Sports de Gerland in Lyon, France from 15 October until 22 October 1990. The draw comprised 32 players and eight were seeded. John McEnroe was the defending champion, but did not participate this year. Sixth-seeded Marc Rosset won the singles title, defeating unseeded Mats Wilander, in the final, 6–3, 6–2.

== Seeds ==
1. (United States) Aaron Krickstein (quarterfinals)
2. (France) Guy Forget (first round)
3. (Sweden) Jonas Svensson (quarterfinals)
4. (Haiti) Ronald Agénor (quarterfinals)
5. (Soviet Union) Andrei Cherkasov (first round)
6. (Switzerland) Marc Rosset (champion)
7. (France) Yannick Noah (second round)
8. (France) Jean-Philippe Fleurian (first round)

== Draw ==
=== Key ===
- Q = Qualifier
- WC = Wild card
- LL = Lucky loser
- Alt = Alternate
- SE = Special exempt
- PR = Protected ranking
- ITF = ITF entry
- JE = Junior exempt
- w/o = Walkover
- r = Retired
- d = Defaulted
- SR = Special ranking

=== Finals ===
Semifinals
Q | (West Germany) Alexander Mronz | 2 | 6
(Sweden) Mats Wilander | 6 | 7
6 | (Switzerland) Marc Rosset | 6 | 1 | 6
(United States) David Pate | 4 | 6 | 4

Final
(Sweden) Mats Wilander | 3 | 2
6 | (Switzerland) Marc Rosset | 6 | 6

=== Top half ===
First round
1 | (United States) A Krickstein | 7 | 6
Q | (Senegal) Y Doumbia | 6 | 4
(Sweden) C Bergström | 6 | 6
LL | (Czechoslovakia) C Suk | 1 | 2
Q | (United States) L Jensen | 3 | 6
WC | (France) É Winogradsky | 6 | 7
Q | (West Germany) A Mronz | 3 | 6 | 6
8 | (France) J-P Fleurian | 6 | 3 | 0
3 | (Sweden) J Svensson | 6 | 6
(France) T Benhabiles | 2 | 3
(Belgium) E Masso | 7 | 6
Q | (France) P Gauthier | 6 | 2
(Uruguay) D Pérez | 1 | 6 | 0
(Israel) G Bloom | 6 | 0 | 6
(Sweden) M Wilander | 6 | 3 | 6
5 | (Soviet Union) A Cherkasov | 2 | 6 | 3

Second round
1 | (United States) A Krickstein | 6 | 6
(Sweden) C Bergström | 4 | 3
WC | (France) É Winogradsky | 7 | 4 | 4
Q | (West Germany) A Mronz | 6 | 6 | 6
3 | (Sweden) J Svensson | 6 | 7
(Belgium) E Masso | 4 | 6
(Israel) G Bloom | 2 | 2
(Sweden) M Wilander | 6 | 6

Quarterfinals
1 | (United States) A Krickstein | 4 | 6 | 4
Q | (West Germany) A Mronz | 6 | 2 | 6
3 | (Sweden) J Svensson | 6 | 4 | 3
(Sweden) M Wilander | 4 | 6 | 6

Semifinals
Q | (West Germany) A Mronz | 2 | 6
(Sweden) M Wilander | 6 | 7

=== Bottom half ===
First round
6 | (Switzerland) M Rosset | 7 | 6 | 7
(Czechoslovakia) M Šrejber | 6 | 7 | 6
(West Germany) E Jelen | 5 | 6 | 7
(United States) M Washington | 7 | 0 | 5
(France) F Santoro | 1 | 6 | 3
(India) R Krishnan | 6 | 4 | 6
(United States) B Shelton | 7 | 3 | 1
4 | (Haiti) R Agénor | 6 | 6 | 6
7 | (France) Y Noah | 3 | 7 | 6
(United States) K Jones | 6 | 5 | 3
WC | (France) G Raoux | 3 | 4
(South Africa) G Muller | 6 | 6
(France) T Champion | 6 | 6
WC | (France) C Pioline | 4 | 3
(United States) D Pate | 7 | 4 | 7
2 | (France) G Forget | 6 | 6 | 6

Second round
6 | (Switzerland) M Rosset | 6 | 3 | 6
(West Germany) E Jelen | 1 | 6 | 3
(India) R Krishnan | 6 | 6 | 5
4 | (Haiti) R Agénor | 1 | 7 | 7
7 | (France) Y Noah | 2 | 4
(South Africa) G Muller | 6 | 6
(France) T Champion | 3 | 6 | 3
(United States) D Pate | 6 | 3 | 6

Quarterfinals
6 | (Switzerland) M Rosset | 7 | 7
4 | (Haiti) R Agénor | 6 | 5
(South Africa) G Muller | 6 | 6 | 3
(United States) D Pate | 7 | 4 | 6

Semifinals
6 | (Switzerland) M Rosset | 6 | 1 | 6
(United States) D Pate | 4 | 6 | 4
