= 1990 Grand Prix de Tennis de Lyon =

- Date: 15–22 October 1990
- Edition: 4th
- Category: ATP World Series
- Draw: 32S / 16D
- Prize money: $450,000
- Surface: Carpet / indoor
- Location: Lyon, France
- Venue: Palais des Sports de Gerland

Champions

Singles
- (Switzerland) Marc Rosset

Doubles
- (United States) Patrick Galbraith / (United States) Kelly Jones
← 1989 ·	Grand Prix de Tennis de Lyon	· 1991 →

The 1990 Grand Prix de Tennis de Lyon was a men's tennis tournament played on indoor carpet courts at the Palais des Sports de Gerland in Lyon, France, and was part of the World Series of the 1990 ATP Tour. It was the fourth edition of the tournament and took place from 15 October through 22 October 1990. Sixth-seeded Marc Rosset won the singles title.

== Finals ==
=== Singles ===
(Switzerland) Marc Rosset defeated (Sweden) Mats Wilander 6–3, 6–2

- It was Rosset's only title of the year and the 2nd of his career.

=== Doubles ===
(United States) Patrick Galbraith / (United States) Kelly Jones defeated (United States) Jim Grabb / (United States) David Pate 7–6, 6–4

- It was Galbraith's 2nd title of the year and the 3rd of his career. It was Jones' 4th title of the year and the 7th of his career.
