= 1991 Grand Prix de Tennis de Lyon – Singles =

Singles
- 1991 Grand Prix de Tennis de Lyon

Final
- Champion: (United States) Pete Sampras
- Runner-up: (France) Olivier Delaître
- Score: 6–1, 6–1

Details
- Draw: 32
- Seeds: 8

Events
Singles	Doubles
← 1990 ·	Grand Prix de Tennis de Lyon	· 1992 →

The 1991 Grand Prix de Tennis de Lyon – Singles was an event of the 1991 Grand Prix de Tennis de Lyon men's tennis tournament that was played at the Palais des Sports de Gerland in Lyon, France from 14 October until 21 October 1991. The draw comprised 32 players and eight were seeded. Eighth-seeded Marc Rosset was the defending champion, but lost in the first round to Fabrice Santoro. Second-seeded Pete Sampras won the singles title, defeating unseeded Olivier Delaître, in the final, 6–1, 6–1.

== Seeds ==
1. (France) Guy Forget (first round)
2. (United States) Pete Sampras (champion)
3. (Spain) Sergi Bruguera (semifinals)
4. (United States) Brad Gilbert (semifinals)
5. (United States) Derrick Rostagno (first round)
6. (Argentina) Alberto Mancini (quarterfinals)
7. (Sweden) Jonas Svensson (quarterfinals)
8. (Switzerland) Marc Rosset (first round)

== Draw ==
=== Key ===
- Q = Qualifier
- WC = Wild card
- LL = Lucky loser
- Alt = Alternate
- ITF = ITF entry
- PR = Protected ranking
- SR = Special ranking
- SE = Special exempt
- JE = Junior exempt
- JR = Junior Accelerator Programme entrant
- CO = College Accelerator Programme entrant
- NG = Next Gen Accelerator Program entrant
- w/o = Walkover
- r = Retired
- d = Defaulted

=== Finals ===
Semifinals
WC	(France) Olivier Delaître	6	6
3	(Spain) Sergi Bruguera	4	4
4	(United States) Brad Gilbert	1	2
2	(United States) Pete Sampras	6	6

Final
WC	(France) Olivier Delaître	1	1
2	(United States) Pete Sampras	6	6

=== Top half ===
First round
1	(France) G Forget	6	4	3
WC	(France) O Delaître	1	6	6
(France) C Pioline	7	6^{5}	6
(Spain) T Carbonell	5	7^{7}	3
(United States) J Kriek	7^{7}	6
(Italy) S Pescosolido	6^{5}	3
(France) F Santoro	6	6
8	(Switzerland) M Rosset	1	3
3	(Spain) S Bruguera	3	6	6
SE	(France) A Boetsch	6	3	4
(France) J-P Fleurian	3	2
(France) G Raoux	6	6
WC	(France) F Fontang	0	6^{4}
SE	(South Africa) C van Rensburg	6	7^{7}
(United States) K Curren	6^{5}	7^{7}	7^{7}
5	(United States) D Rostagno	7^{7}	6^{3}	6^{4}

Second round
WC	(France) O Delaître	6	6^{6}	7^{7}
(France) C Pioline	2	7^{8}	6^{3}
(United States) J Kriek	6	6
(France) F Santoro	4	4
3	(Spain) S Bruguera	7^{10}	7^{7}
(France) G Raoux	6^{8}	6^{2}
SE	(South Africa) C van Rensburg	1	2
(United States) K Curren	6	6

Quarterfinals
WC	(France) O Delaître	6	7^{7}
(United States) J Kriek	2	6^{3}
3	(Spain) S Bruguera	6	7^{7}
(United States) K Curren	0	6^{3}

Semifinals
WC	(France) O Delaître	6	6
3	(Spain) S Bruguera	4	4

=== Bottom half ===
First round
6	(Argentina) A Mancini	2	7	7^{7}
(Germany) C Saceanu	6	5	6^{2}
(Sweden) N Kulti	6	6
(Finland) V Paloheimo	2	4
Q	(France) É Winogradsky	6	3	6
Q	(United States) S DeVries	1	6	3
(Germany) A Mronz	3	5
4	(United States) B Gilbert	6	7
7	(Sweden) J Svensson	1	6	7^{7}
(Germany) P Kühnen	6	3	6^{3}
(Haiti) R Agénor	6^{9}	7	7
Q	(Senegal) Y Doumbia	7^{11}	5	5
(France) T Champion	6	6
WC	(France) Y Noah	4	4
Q	(Netherlands) T Nijssen	3	2
2	(United States) P Sampras	6	6

Second round
6	(Argentina) A Mancini	7^{10}	6
(Sweden) N Kulti	6^{8}	4
Q	(France) É Winogradsky	5	1
4	(United States) B Gilbert	7	6
7	(Sweden) J Svensson	6^{4}	6	6
(Haiti) R Agénor	7^{7}	3	1
(France) T Champion	1	3
2	(United States) P Sampras	6	6

Quarterfinals
6	(Argentina) A Mancini	2	2
4	(United States) B Gilbert	6	6
7	(Sweden) J Svensson	2	2
2	(United States) P Sampras	6	6

Semifinals
4	(United States) B Gilbert	1	2
2	(United States) P Sampras	6	6
