= 1993 Grand Prix de Tennis de Lyon – Singles =

Singles
- 1993 Grand Prix de Tennis de Lyon

Final
- Champion: (United States) Pete Sampras
- Runner-up: (France) Cédric Pioline
- Score: 7–6^{(7–5)}, 1–6, 7–5

Details
- Draw: 32
- Seeds: 8

Events
Singles	Doubles
← 1992 ·	Grand Prix de Tennis de Lyon	· 1994 →

Pete Sampras was the defending champion and successfully defended his title, beating Cédric Pioline 7–6^{(7–5)}, 1–6, 7–5 in the final.

== Seeds ==
1. (United States) Pete Sampras (champion)
2. (Germany) Boris Becker (first round)
3. (Germany) Michael Stich (first round)
4. (Ukraine) Andrei Medvedev (first round)
5. (France) Cédric Pioline (final)
6. (France) Arnaud Boetsch (quarterfinals)
7. (Russia) Andrei Chesnokov (first round)
8. (Australia) Richard Fromberg (semifinals)

== Draw ==
=== Key ===
- Q = Qualifier
- WC = Wild card
- LL = Lucky loser
- Alt = Alternate
- ITF = ITF entry
- PR = Protected ranking
- SR = Special ranking
- SE = Special exempt
- JE = Junior exempt
- JR = Junior Accelerator Programme entrant
- CO = College Accelerator Programme entrant
- NG = Next Gen Accelerator Program entrant
- w/o = Walkover
- r = Retired
- d = Defaulted

=== Finals ===
Semifinals
1	(United States) Pete Sampras	1	6	7^{7}
WC	(Switzerland) Jakob Hlasek	6	3	6^{3}
WC/5	(France) Cédric Pioline	6	6^{2}	6
8	(Australia) Richard Fromberg	3	7^{7}	4

Final
1	(United States) Pete Sampras	7^{7}	1	7
WC/5	(France) Cédric Pioline	6^{5}	6	5

=== Top half ===
First round
1	(United States) P Sampras	7	6
(Spain) T Carbonell	5	3
(Germany) M Naewie	6	7
(Spain) J Burillo	4	5
(Switzerland) C Mezzadri	5	6	3
(France) S Simian	7	3	6
(Czech Republic) D Vacek	6	6
7	(Russia) A Chesnokov	4	3
WC/4	(Ukraine) A Medvedev	3	4
(Germany) K Braasch	6	6
(Italy) D Nargiso	3	2
WC	(Switzerland) J Hlasek	6	6
(Russia) A Olhovskiy	7^{7}	6
(United States) D Wheaton	6^{4}	4
(Germany) P Kühnen	1	6	1
6	(France) A Boetsch	6	3	6

Second round
1	(United States) P Sampras	6	6
(Germany) M Naewie	3	3
(France) S Simian	6	4	6
(Czech Republic) D Vacek	3	6	2
(Germany) K Braasch	1	7^{8}	3
WC	(Switzerland) J Hlasek	6	6^{6}	6
(Russia) A Olhovskiy	5	3
6	(France) A Boetsch	7	6

Quarterfinals
1	(United States) P Sampras	6	7
(France) S Simian	4	5
WC	(Switzerland) J Hlasek	7^{7}	5	7
6	(France) A Boetsch	6^{5}	7	5

Semifinals
1	(United States) P Sampras	1	6	7^{8}
WC	(Switzerland) J Hlasek	6	3	6^{6}

=== Bottom half ===
First round
WC/5	(France) C Pioline	7^{10}	7^{16}
(Morocco) Y El Aynaoui	6^{8}	6^{14}
(Spain) JF Altur	6	4	3
(Czech Republic) D Rikl	2	6	6
(Czech Republic) M Damm	7	2	6
Q	(Germany) H Dreekmann	5	6	2
Q	(Russia) Y Kafelnikov	6	7^{7}
3	(Germany) M Stich	3	6^{4}
8	(Australia) R Fromberg	6^{4}	6	6
(Italy) S Pescosolido	7^{7}	2	3
(France) G Raoux	2	4
Q	(Senegal) Y Doumbia	6	6
Q	(France) L Barthez	6	7^{7}
(Spain) MA Gorriz	3	6^{5}
(France) O Delaître	7^{9}	6^{4}	6
2	(Germany) B Becker	6^{7}	7^{7}	3

Second round
WC/5	(France) C Pioline	6	6
(Czech Republic) D Rikl	2	1
(Czech Republic) M Damm	6	7^{10}
Q	(Russia) Y Kafelnikov	4	6^{8}
8	(Australia) R Fromberg	6	6^{2}	6
Q	(Senegal) Y Doumbia	4	7^{7}	4
Q	(France) L Barthez	6	6
(France) O Delaître	4	4

Quarterfinals
WC/5	(France) C Pioline	7	6
(Czech Republic) M Damm	5	2
8	(Australia) R Fromberg	6^{4}	6	7^{7}
Q	(France) L Barthez	7^{7}	4	6^{5}

Semifinals
WC/5	(France) C Pioline	6	6^{2}	6
8	(Australia) R Fromberg	3	7^{7}	4
