= 1993 Grand Prix de Tennis de Lyon =

- Date: 18–25 October 1993
- Edition: 7th
- Category: World Series
- Draw: 32S / 16D
- Prize money: $575,000
- Surface: Carpet / indoor
- Location: Lyon, France
- Venue: Palais des Sports de Gerland

Champions

Singles
- (United States) Pete Sampras

Doubles
- (South Africa) Gary Muller / (South Africa) Danie Visser
← 1992 ·	Grand Prix de Tennis de Lyon	· 1994 →

The 1993 Grand Prix de Tennis de Lyon was a men's tennis tournament played on indoor carpet courts at the Palais des Sports de Gerland in Lyon, France, and was part of the World Series of the 1993 ATP Tour. It was the seventh edition of the tournament and took place from 18 October through 25 October 1993. First-seeded Pete Sampras won the singles title, his third consecutive at the event.

== Finals ==
=== Singles ===
(United States) Pete Sampras defeated (France) Cédric Pioline 7–6^{(7–5)}, 1–6, 7–5

- It was Sampras' 7th title of the year and the 20th of his career.

=== Doubles ===
(South Africa) Gary Muller / (South Africa) Danie Visser defeated (South Africa) John-Laffnie de Jager / (South Africa) Stefan Kruger 6–3, 7–6

- It was Muller's only title of the year and the 6th of his career. It was Visser's 3rd title of the year and the 16th of his career.
