= 1987 Grand Prix de Tennis de Lyon =

- Date: 2–9 February 1987
- Edition: 1st
- Category: Grand Prix circuit
- Draw: 32S / 16D
- Prize money: $150,000
- Surface: Carpet / indoor
- Location: Lyon, France
- Venue: Palais des Sports de Gerland

Champions

Singles
- (France) Yannick Noah

Doubles
- (France) Guy Forget / (France) Yannick Noah
Grand Prix de Tennis de Lyon	· 1988 →

The 1987 Grand Prix de Tennis de Lyon was a men's tennis tournament played on indoor carpet courts at the Palais des Sports de Gerland in Lyon, France, and was part of the 1987 Nabisco Grand Prix. It was the inaugural edition of the tournament and ran from 2 February through 9 February 1987. First-seeded Yannick Noah, who entered on a wildcard, won the singles title.

== Finals ==
=== Singles ===
(France) Yannick Noah defeated (Sweden) Joakim Nyström 6–4, 7–5

- It was Noah's 2nd title of the year and the 29th of his career.

=== Doubles ===
(France) Guy Forget / (France) Yannick Noah defeated (United States) Kelly Jones / (United States) David Pate 4–6, 6–3, 6–4

- It was Forget's 1st title of the year and the 10th of his career. It was Noah's 1st title of the year and the 28th of his career.
