= 1988 Grand Prix de Tennis de Lyon – Doubles =

Doubles
- 1988 Grand Prix de Tennis de Lyon

Final
- Champions: (Australia) Brad Drewett (Australia) Broderick Dyke
- Runners-up: (Denmark) Michael Mortensen (United States) Blaine Willenborg
- Score: 3–6, 6–3, 6–4

Details
- Draw: 16
- Seeds: 4

Events
| Singles | Doubles |
| ← 1987 · | Grand Prix de Tennis de Lyon | · 1989 → |

Guy Forget and Yannick Noah were the defending champions, but Noah did not participate this year. Forget partnered Loïc Courteau, losing in the semifinals.

Brad Drewett and Broderick Dyke won the title, defeating Michael Mortensen and Blaine Willenborg 3–6, 6–3, 6–4 in the final.

== Seeds ==
1. (Denmark) Michael Mortensen / (United States) Blaine Willenborg (final)
2. (Iran) Mansour Bahrami / (Uruguay) Diego Pérez (first round)
3. (France) Loïc Courteau / (France) Guy Forget (semifinals)
4. (Australia) Brad Drewett / (Australia) Broderick Dyke (champions)

== Draw ==
=== Key ===
- Q = Qualifier
- WC = Wild card
- LL = Lucky loser
- Alt = Alternate
- SE = Special exempt
- PR = Protected ranking
- ITF = ITF entry
- JE = Junior exempt
- w/o = Walkover
- r = Retired
- d = Defaulted
- SR = Special ranking

=== Draw ===
First round
1 | (Denmark) M Mortensen (United States) B Willenborg | 6 | 6
(United States) CB Cox (Nigeria) N Odizor | 4 | 3
(Austria) A Antonitsch (West Germany) W Popp | 6 | 7
(United States) B Dickinson (France) Francois Servelle | 4 | 6
3 | (France) L Courteau (France) G Forget | 7 | 6
(France) B Dadillon (Sweden) C Falk | 6 | 4
(Israel) G Bloom (Czechoslovakia) P Korda | 7 | 6
(New Zealand) D Lewis (West Germany) I Werner | 6 | 1
(United States) K Jones (United States) T Nelson | 6 | 6
(United States) J Brown (United States) M Flur | 4 | 1
(France) T Pham (Italy) G Pozzi | 3 | 6 | 1
4 | (Australia) B Drewett (Australia) B Dyke | 6 | 3 | 6
(United States) R Baxter (United States) B Scanlon | 6 | 7
LL | (Senegal) Y Doumbia (Canada) M Laurendeau | 4 | 6
(France) J Potier (France) É Winogradsky | 5 | 6 | 6
2 | (Iran) M Bahrami (Uruguay) D Pérez | 7 | 4 | 2

Quarterfinals
1 | (Denmark) M Mortensen (United States) B Willenborg | 7 | 6 | 6
(Austria) A Antonitsch (West Germany) W Popp | 5 | 7 | 4
3 | (France) L Courteau (France) G Forget | 7 | 6
(Israel) G Bloom (Czechoslovakia) P Korda | 6 | 4
(United States) K Jones (United States) T Nelson | 4 | 4
4 | (Australia) B Drewett (Australia) B Dyke | 6 | 6
(United States) R Baxter (United States) B Scanlon | 3 | 2
(France) J Potier (France) É Winogradsky | 6 | 6

Semifinals
1 | (Denmark) M Mortensen (United States) B Willenborg | 6 | 7
3 | (France) L Courteau (France) G Forget | 2 | 6
4 | (Australia) B Drewett (Australia) B Dyke | 6 | 6
(France) J Potier (France) É Winogradsky | 2 | 1

Final
1 | (Denmark) M Mortensen (United States) B Willenborg | 6 | 3 | 4
4 | (Australia) B Drewett (Australia) B Dyke | 3 | 6 | 6
