= 1993 Rado Swiss Open =

- Date: 5–11 July
- Edition: 48th
- Category: World Series
- Draw: 32S / 16D
- Prize money: $375,000
- Surface: Clay / outdoor
- Location: Gstaad, Switzerland
- Venue: Roy Emerson Arena

Champions

Singles
- (Spain) Sergi Bruguera

Doubles
- (France) Cédric Pioline / (Switzerland) Marc Rosset
- Suisse Open Gstaad

The 1993 Rado Swiss Open, also known as Suisse Open Gstaad, was an men's professional tennis tournament played on outdoor clay courts at the Roy Emerson Arena in Gstaad, Switzerland that was part of the World Series category of the 1993 ATP Tour. It was the 48th edition of the tournament and was held from 5 July until 11 July 1993. First-seeded Sergi Bruguera won his second consecutive singles title at the event.

== Finals ==
=== Singles ===
(Spain) Sergi Bruguera defeated (Czech Republic) Karel Nováček 6–3, 6–4

- It was Bruguera's 3rd singles title of the year and the 9th of his career.

=== Doubles ===
(France) Cédric Pioline / (Switzerland) Marc Rosset defeated (Netherlands) Hendrik Jan Davids / (South Africa) Piet Norval 6–3, 3–6, 7–6

- It was Pioline's only doubles title of his career. It was Rosset's only doubles title of the year and the 6th of his career.
