= 1994 Grand Prix de Tennis de Lyon – Singles =

Singles
- 1994 Grand Prix de Tennis de Lyon

Final
- Champion: (Switzerland) Marc Rosset
- Runner-up: (United States) Jim Courier
- Score: 6–4, 7–6^{(7–2)}

Events
Singles	Doubles
← 1993 ·	Grand Prix de Tennis de Lyon	· 1995 →

Pete Sampras was the defending champion, but did not participate this year.

Marc Rosset won the tournament, beating Jim Courier 6–4, 7–6^{(7–2)} in the final.

== Seeds ==
1. (Ukraine) Andrei Medvedev (semifinals)
2. (Russia) Yevgeny Kafelnikov (quarterfinals)
3. (South Africa) Wayne Ferreira (quarterfinals)
4. (United States) Jim Courier (final)
5. (Switzerland) Marc Rosset (champion)
6. (Australia) Jason Stoltenberg (first round)
7. (Australia) Patrick Rafter (quarterfinals)
8. (United States) MaliVai Washington (second round)

== Draw ==
=== Key ===
- Q = Qualifier
- WC = Wild card
- LL = Lucky loser
- Alt = Alternate
- ITF = ITF entry
- PR = Protected ranking
- SR = Special ranking
- SE = Special exempt
- JE = Junior exempt
- JR = Junior Accelerator Programme entrant
- CO = College Accelerator Programme entrant
- NG = Next Gen Accelerator Program entrant
- w/o = Walkover
- r = Retired
- d = Defaulted

=== Finals ===
Semifinals
1	(Ukraine) Andrei Medvedev	2	2
5	(Switzerland) Marc Rosset	6	6
4	(United States) Jim Courier	6	6
(Russia) Andrei Chesnokov	3	4

Final
5	(Switzerland) Marc Rosset	6	7^{7}
4	(United States) Jim Courier	4	6^{2}

=== Top half ===
First round
1	(Ukraine) A Medvedev	6	4	6
SE	(Italy) D Nargiso	3	6	4
(Spain) J Sánchez	2	3
SE	(Germany) H Dreekmann	6	6
(Switzerland) J Hlasek	6	6
(France) H Leconte	3	1
(Sweden) J Björkman	3	3
7	(Australia) P Rafter	6	6
3	(South Africa) W Ferreira	6^{7}	7^{11}	6
(Germany) M Zoecke	7^{9}	6^{9}	3
(Spain) T Carbonell	3	3
Q	(Germany) L Rehmann	6	6
(Czech Republic) D Vacek	7^{10}	5	7^{9}
(Czech Republic) M Damm	6^{8}	7	6^{7}
(France) F Santoro	6^{1}	1
5	(Switzerland) M Rosset	7^{7}	6

Second round
1	(Ukraine) A Medvedev	6	6
SE	(Germany) H Dreekmann	3	2
(Switzerland) J Hlasek	3	4
7	(Australia) P Rafter	6	6
3	(South Africa) W Ferreira	7^{7}	7^{8}
Q	(Germany) L Rehmann	6^{4}	6^{6}
(Czech Republic) D Vacek	6	2	5
5	(Switzerland) M Rosset	3	6	7

Quarterfinals
1	(Ukraine) A Medvedev	6	6
7	(Australia) P Rafter	2	1
3	(South Africa) W Ferreira	6^{4}	6^{4}
5	(Switzerland) M Rosset	7^{7}	7^{7}

Semifinals
1	(Ukraine) A Medvedev	2	2
5	(Switzerland) M Rosset	6	6

=== Bottom half ===
First round
6	(Australia) J Stoltenberg	7	3	1
(France) O Delaître	5	6	6
WC	(France) L Roux	6	6
Q	(France) H Grenier	1	2
Q	(Spain) JL Rascón	1	6	2
(France) A Boetsch	6	3	6
WC	(France) G Forget	6^{2}	2
4	(United States) J Courier	7^{7}	6
8	(United States) M Washington	6^{5}	6	6
(United Kingdom) J Bates	7^{7}	2	4
Q	(France) R Gilbert	6^{7}	3
(Russia) A Chesnokov	6	7^{9}
WC	(France) S Simian	1	6^{9}
(France) C Pioline	6	7^{11}
(Australia) R Fromberg	4	4
2	(Russia) Y Kafelnikov	6	6

Second round
(France) O Delaître	1	4
WC	(France) L Roux	6	6
(France) A Boetsch	3	6^{8}
4	(United States) J Courier	6	7^{10}
8	(United States) M Washington	4	6^{4}
(Russia) A Chesnokov	6	7^{7}
(France) C Pioline	4	4
2	(Russia) Y Kafelnikov	6	6

Quarterfinals
WC	(France) L Roux	4	6	6^{3}
4	(United States) J Courier	6	2	7^{7}
(Russia) A Chesnokov	5	7^{7}	6
2	(Russia) Y Kafelnikov	7	6^{0}	1

Semifinals
4	(United States) J Courier	6	6
(Russia) A Chesnokov	3	4
