= 1994 Grand Prix Passing Shot – Singles =

Singles
- 1994 Grand Prix Passing Shot

Final
- Champion: (South Africa) Wayne Ferreira
- Runner-up: (United States) Jeff Tarango
- Score: 6–0, 7–5

Details
- Draw: 32 (3WC/4Q)
- Seeds: 8

Events
Singles	Doubles
← 1993 ·	ATP Bordeaux	· 1995 →

Sergi Bruguera was the defending champion, but did not compete this year.

Wayne Ferreira won the title by defeating Jeff Tarango 6–0, 7–5 in the final.

== Seeds ==
1. (Russia) Yevgeny Kafelnikov (second round)
2. (South Africa) Wayne Ferreira (champion)
3. (France) Cédric Pioline (quarterfinals)
4. (Switzerland) Marc Rosset (semifinals)
5. (France) Arnaud Boetsch (first round)
6. (Haiti) Ronald Agénor (first round)
7. (France) Olivier Delaître (quarterfinals)
8. (Switzerland) Jakob Hlasek (first round)

== Draw ==
=== Key ===
- Q = Qualifier
- WC = Wild card
- LL = Lucky loser
- Alt = Alternate
- SE = Special exempt
- PR = Protected ranking
- ITF = ITF entry
- JE = Junior exempt
- w/o = Walkover
- r = Retired
- d = Defaulted
- SR = Special ranking

=== Finals ===
Semifinals
(United States) Jeff Tarango	6	6
4	(Switzerland) Marc Rosset	1	3
(France) Guy Forget	3	7^{7}	1
2	(South Africa) Wayne Ferreira	6	6^{4}	6

Final
(United States) Jeff Tarango	0	5
2	(South Africa) Wayne Ferreira	6	7

=== Top half ===
First round
1	(Russia) Y Kafelnikov	6	6
(Morocco) Y El Aynaoui	4	3
(Russia) A Olhovskiy	3	6^{3}
(United States) J Tarango	6	7^{7}
(Netherlands) J Siemerink	6^{4}	4
(France) G Raoux	7^{7}	6
(France) R Gilbert	3	7^{7}	6
8	(Switzerland) J Hlasek	6	6^{3}	3
4	(Switzerland) M Rosset	7	6
(Denmark) K Carlsen	5	4
(Sweden) L Jönsson	7^{7}	3	2
Q	(France) G Bastié	6^{5}	6	6
(Austria) A Antonitsch	6	6
(France) L Roux	4	3
(France) F Santoro	6	7
5	(France) A Boetsch	4	5

Second round
1	(Russia) Y Kafelnikov	0	1
(United States) J Tarango	6	6
(France) G Raoux	2	6	6
(France) R Gilbert	6	2	1
4	(Switzerland) M Rosset	6	6
Q	(France) G Bastié	1	2
(Austria) A Antonitsch	1	7^{7}	2
(France) F Santoro	6	6^{5}	6

Quarterfinals
(United States) J Tarango	6	6
(France) G Raoux	4	3
4	(Switzerland) M Rosset	6	6
(France) F Santoro	3	1

Semifinals
(United States) J Tarango	6	6
4	(Switzerland) M Rosset	1	3

=== Bottom half ===
First round
6	(Haiti) R Agénor	3	1
(France) G Forget	6	6
Q	(South Africa) D Adams	6	6
(Spain) J Burillo	3	2
(Germany) J Renzenbrink	6	2	2
(Italy) G Pozzi	2	6	6
(Germany) H Dreekmann	6^{4}	7^{7}	5
3	(France) C Pioline	7^{7}	6^{4}	7
7/WC	(France) O Delaître	6	6
(France) L Barthez	3	4
(United Kingdom) M Petchey	4	2
WC	(France) T Champion	6	6
(Italy) D Nargiso	4	3
WC	(Sweden) M Wilander	6	6
Q	(South Africa) M Barnard	4	2
2	(South Africa) W Ferreira	6	6

Second round
(France) G Forget	6	6
Q	(South Africa) D Adams	3	2
(Italy) G Pozzi	7^{7}	6^{2}	4
3	(France) C Pioline	6^{2}	7^{7}	6
7/WC	(France) O Delaître	6	3	7
WC	(France) T Champion	1	6	5
WC	(Sweden) M Wilander	6	2	3
2	(South Africa) W Ferreira	2	6	6

Quarterfinals
(France) G Forget	5	6	6
3	(France) C Pioline	7	4	3
7/WC	(France) O Delaître	3	4
2	(South Africa) W Ferreira	6	6

Semifinals
(France) G Forget	3	7^{7}	1
2	(South Africa) W Ferreira	6	6^{4}	6
