= 1994 Grand Prix de Tennis de Lyon – Doubles =

Doubles
- 1994 Grand Prix de Tennis de Lyon

Final
- Champions: (Switzerland) Jakob Hlasek (Russia) Yevgeny Kafelnikov
- Runners-up: (Czech Republic) Martin Damm (Australia) Patrick Rafter
- Score: 6–7, 7–6, 7–6

Details
- Draw: 16
- Seeds: 4

Events
Singles	Doubles
← 1993 ·	Grand Prix de Tennis de Lyon	· 1995 →

Gary Muller and Danie Visser were the defending champions, but lost in the quarterfinals this year.

Jakob Hlasek and Yevgeny Kafelnikov won the title, defeating Martin Damm and Patrick Rafter 6–7, 7–6, 7–6 in the final.

== Seeds ==
1. (Netherlands) Tom Nijssen / (Czech Republic) Cyril Suk (semifinals)
2. (Netherlands) Menno Oosting / (Czech Republic) Daniel Vacek (first round)
3. (France) Olivier Delaître / (Italy) Diego Nargiso (semifinals)
4. (South Africa) Gary Muller / (South Africa) Danie Visser (quarterfinals)

== Draw ==
=== Key ===
- Q = Qualifier
- WC = Wild card
- LL = Lucky loser
- Alt = Alternate
- ITF = ITF entry
- PR = Protected ranking
- SR = Special ranking
- SE = Special exempt
- JE = Junior exempt
- JR = Junior Accelerator Programme entrant
- CO = College Accelerator Programme entrant
- NG = Next Gen Accelerator Program entrant
- w/o = Walkover
- r = Retired
- d = Defaulted

=== Draw ===
First round
1	(Netherlands) T Nijssen (Czech Republic) C Suk	7	6	6
(United States) B Shelton (Netherlands) F Wibier	6	7	1
(United States) B Pearce (United States) D Randall	2	7	3
WC	(France) A Boetsch (Switzerland) M Rosset	6	6	6
4	(South Africa) G Muller (South Africa) D Visser	7	6
Q	(France) G Bastié (Italy) C Caratti	6	3
(Czech Republic) M Damm (Australia) P Rafter	6	6
WC	(United States) J Courier (United States) T Nelson	2	4
(South Africa) L Bale (South Africa) J-L de Jager	6	7
WC	(France) C Pioline (France) F Santoro	3	5
(Australia) W Arthurs (Australia) J Ireland	7	5	3
3	(France) O Delaître (Italy) D Nargiso	6	7	6
(Spain) T Carbonell (Spain) J Sánchez	6	5	3
(France) R Gilbert (France) S Simian	3	7	6
(Switzerland) J Hlasek (Russia) Y Kafelnikov	7	6
2	(Netherlands) M Oosting (Czech Republic) D Vacek	6	4

Quarterfinals
1	(Netherlands) T Nijssen (Czech Republic) C Suk	6	2	7
WC	(France) A Boetsch (Switzerland) M Rosset	3	6	6
4	(South Africa) G Muller (South Africa) D Visser	4	6
(Czech Republic) M Damm (Australia) P Rafter	6	7
(South Africa) L Bale (South Africa) J-L de Jager	5	3
3	(France) O Delaître (Italy) D Nargiso	7	6
(France) R Gilbert (France) S Simian	5	3
(Switzerland) J Hlasek (Russia) Y Kafelnikov	7	6

Semifinals
1	(Netherlands) T Nijssen (Czech Republic) C Suk	3	3
(Czech Republic) M Damm (Australia) P Rafter	6	6
3	(France) O Delaître (Italy) D Nargiso	7	6	3
(Switzerland) J Hlasek (Russia) Y Kafelnikov	6	7	6

Final
(Czech Republic) M Damm (Australia) P Rafter	7	6	6
(Switzerland) J Hlasek (Russia) Y Kafelnikov	6	7	7
