= 1995 Grand Prix Passing Shot – Singles =

Singles
- 1995 Grand Prix Passing Shot

Final
- Champion: (Senegal) Yahiya Doumbia
- Runner-up: (Switzerland) Jakob Hlasek
- Score: 6–4, 6–4

Details
- Draw: 32 (3WC/4Q)
- Seeds: 8

Events
Singles	Doubles
← 1994 ·	ATP Bordeaux

Wayne Ferreira was the defending champion, but lost in the second round to Ronald Agénor.

Qualifier Yahiya Doumbia won the title by defeating Jakob Hlasek 6–4, 6–4 in the final. Doumbia became the first professional player ever to win two ATP tournaments as a qualifier, after also winning at Lyon in 1988.

== Seeds ==
1. (Croatia) Goran Ivanišević (quarterfinals)
2. (South Africa) Wayne Ferreira (second round)
3. (Switzerland) Marc Rosset (first round, retired)
4. (United Kingdom) Greg Rusedski (second round)
5. (Germany) David Prinosil (second round)
6. (France) Olivier Delaître (quarterfinals)
7. (Switzerland) Jakob Hlasek (final)
8. (France) Lionel Roux (semifinals)

== Draw ==
=== Key ===
- Q = Qualifier
- WC = Wild card
- LL = Lucky loser
- Alt = Alternate
- SE = Special exempt
- PR = Protected ranking
- ITF = ITF entry
- JE = Junior exempt
- w/o = Walkover
- r = Retired
- d = Defaulted
- SR = Special ranking

=== Finals ===
Semifinals
7	(Switzerland) Jakob Hlasek	6	7
(Australia) Jason Stoltenberg	4	5
Q	(Senegal) Yahiya Doumbia	6	6
8	(France) Lionel Roux	4	2

Final
7	(Switzerland) Jakob Hlasek	4	4
Q	(Senegal) Yahiya Doumbia	6	6

=== Top half ===
First round
1	(Croatia) G Ivanišević	6	6
(Kenya) P Wekesa	3	1
(United Kingdom) C Wilkinson	4	7	1
(Czech Republic) R Vašek	6	5	6
(Belgium) D Norman	7^{7}	6
(Belgium) K Goossens	6^{3}	3
(Germany) A Mronz	3	3
7	(Switzerland) J Hlasek	6	6
3	(Switzerland) M Rosset	1	0^{r}
(Italy) S Pescosolido	6	1
WC	(France) O Mutis	2	2
(Australia) J Stoltenberg	6	6
(Italy) G Pozzi	1	2
Q	(United Kingdom) D Sapsford	6	6
(Portugal) N Marques	4	2
6	(France) O Delaître	6	6

Second round
1	(Croatia) G Ivanišević	6	6
(Czech Republic) R Vašek	4	3
(Belgium) D Norman	1	6^{7}
7	(Switzerland) J Hlasek	6	7^{9}
(Italy) S Pescosolido	4	4
(Australia) J Stoltenberg	6	6
Q	(United Kingdom) D Sapsford	5	0
6	(France) O Delaître	7	6

Quarterfinals
1	(Croatia) G Ivanišević	3	1
7	(Switzerland) J Hlasek	6	6
(Australia) J Stoltenberg	4	7^{7}	6
6	(France) O Delaître	6	6^{4}	1

Semifinals
7	(Switzerland) J Hlasek	6	7
(Australia) J Stoltenberg	4	5

=== Bottom half ===
First round
5	(Germany) D Prinosil	7^{7}	6
Q	(France) G Bastié	6^{3}	2
Q	(France) R Gilbert	2	4
Q	(Senegal) Y Doumbia	6	6
(Spain) J Burillo	6^{3}	6	6^{2}
(France) G Raoux	7^{7}	0	7^{7}
(United States) J Grabb	3	6	1
4	(United Kingdom) G Rusedski	6	3	6
8	(France) L Roux	6	3	6
WC	(France) H Leconte	2	6	3
(United Kingdom) J Bates	3	6^{1}
(Belgium) J Van Herck	6	7^{7}
WC	(Haiti) R Agénor	6	7
(Italy) C Caratti	2	5
(Netherlands) S Schalken	3	4
2	(South Africa) W Ferreira	6	6

Second round
5	(Germany) D Prinosil	3	2
Q	(Senegal) Y Doumbia	6	6
(France) G Raoux	4	7^{7}	6
4	(United Kingdom) G Rusedski	6	6^{5}	4
8	(France) L Roux	6	6
(Belgium) J Van Herck	3	2
WC	(Haiti) R Agénor	6	5	6
2	(South Africa) W Ferreira	3	7	1

Quarterfinals
Q	(Senegal) Y Doumbia	6	6
(France) G Raoux	2	2
8	(France) L Roux	6	6
WC	(Haiti) R Agénor	1	2

Semifinals
Q	(Senegal) Y Doumbia	6	6
8	(France) L Roux	4	2
