= 1989 Grand Prix de Tennis de Lyon – Singles =

Singles
- 1989 Grand Prix de Tennis de Lyon

Final
- Champion: (United States) John McEnroe
- Runner-up: (Switzerland) Jakob Hlasek
- Score: 6–3, 7–6

Details
- Draw: 32
- Seeds: 8

Events
Singles	Doubles
← 1988 ·	Grand Prix de Tennis de Lyon	· 1990 →

The 1989 Grand Prix de Tennis de Lyon – Singles was an event of the 1989 Grand Prix de Tennis de Lyon men's tennis tournament that was played at the Palais des Sports de Gerland in Lyon, France from 20 February until 27 February 1989. The draw comprised 32 players and eight were seeded. Unseeded Yahiya Doumbia was the defending champion but lost in the first round to Jakob Hlasek. Second-seeded John McEnroe won the singles title, defeating first-seeded Jakob Hlasek, in the final, 6–3, 7–6.

== Seeds ==
1. (Switzerland) Jakob Hlasek (final)
2. (United States) John McEnroe (champion)
3. (France) Henri Leconte (quarterfinals)
4. (Sweden) Jonas Svensson (semifinals)
5. (Sweden) Anders Järryd (semifinals)
6. (Sweden) Magnus Gustafsson (quarterfinals)
7. (France) Guy Forget (second round)
8. (West Germany) Patrik Kühnen (quarterfinals)

== Draw ==
=== Key ===
- Q = Qualifier
- WC = Wild card
- LL = Lucky loser
- Alt = Alternate
- ITF = ITF entry
- PR = Protected ranking
- SR = Special ranking
- SE = Special exempt
- JE = Junior exempt
- JR = Junior Accelerator Programme entrant
- CO = College Accelerator Programme entrant
- NG = Next Gen Accelerator Program entrant
- w/o = Walkover
- r = Retired
- d = Defaulted

=== Finals ===
Semifinals
1	(Switzerland) Jakob Hlasek	6	6
5	(Sweden) Anders Järryd	3	3
4	(Sweden) Jonas Svensson	3	5
2	(United States) John McEnroe	6	7

Final
1	(Switzerland) Jakob Hlasek	3	6
2	(United States) John McEnroe	6	7

=== Top half ===
First round
1	(Switzerland) J Hlasek	6	7
(Senegal) Y Doumbia	4	6
WC	(France) E Winogradsky	6	6
(Sweden) P Lundgren	4	4
Q	(Sweden) N Kroon	3	6	6
(France) T Champion	6	4	2
WC	(France) O Delaître	6	1	5
8	(West Germany) P Kühnen	4	6	7
3	(France) H Leconte	6	6
(France) T Tulasne	3	2
Q	(Sweden) R Bergh	6	6
(Belgium) E Masso	4	4
Q	(France) T Benhabiles	5	6	6
(West Germany) C Saceanu	7	3	4
(Netherlands) M Schapers	3	2
5	(Sweden) A Järryd	6	6

Second round
1	(Switzerland) J Hlasek	3	6	6
WC	(France) E Winogradsky	6	4	3
Q	(Sweden) N Kroon	6	1	3
8	(West Germany) P Kühnen	2	6	6
3	(France) H Leconte	4	6	6
Q	(Sweden) R Bergh	6	3	1
Q	(France) T Benhabiles	1	1
5	(Sweden) A Järryd	6	6

Quarterfinals
1	(Switzerland) J Hlasek	6	7
8	(West Germany) P Kühnen	3	6
3	(France) H Leconte	6	5	3
5	(Sweden) A Järryd	4	7	6

Semifinals
1	(Switzerland) J Hlasek	6	6
5	(Sweden) A Järryd	3	3

=== Bottom half ===
First round
6	(Sweden) M Gustafsson	6	6
(Finland) O Rahnasto	3	3
(Netherlands) M Koevermans	1	7	6
(United States) T Nelson	6	6	3
(West Germany) E Jelen	6	6
Q	(West Germany) P Baur	1	1
WC	(France) G Raoux	3	3
4	(Sweden) J Svensson	6	6
7	(France) G Forget	7	6
(United States) P Chamberlin	5	3
(West Germany) C-U Steeb	6	3	6
(Mexico) L Lavalle	0	6	0
(Sweden) C Bergström	6	7
(Italy) D Nargiso	4	6
(United States) R Matuszewski	6	2
2	(United States) J McEnroe	7	6

Second round
6	(Sweden) M Gustafsson	6	6
(Netherlands) M Koevermans	4	2
(West Germany) E Jelen	2	6
4	(Sweden) J Svensson	6	7
7	(France) G Forget	6	5	3
(West Germany) C-U Steeb	4	7	6
(Sweden) C Bergström	3	2
2	(United States) J McEnroe	6	6

Quarterfinals
6	(Sweden) M Gustafsson	2	0
4	(Sweden) J Svensson	6	6
(West Germany) C-U Steeb	2	2
2	(United States) J McEnroe	6	6

Semifinals
4	(Sweden) J Svensson	3	5
2	(United States) J McEnroe	6	7
