= 1991 Grand Prix de Tennis de Lyon – Doubles =

Doubles
- 1991 Grand Prix de Tennis de Lyon

Final
- Champions: (Netherlands) Tom Nijssen (Czechoslovakia) Cyril Suk
- Runners-up: (United States) Steve DeVries (Australia) David Macpherson
- Score: 7–6, 6–3

Details
- Draw: 16
- Seeds: 4

Events
| Singles | Doubles |
| ← 1990 · | Grand Prix de Tennis de Lyon | · 1992 → |

Patrick Galbraith and Kelly Jones were the defending champions, but did not participate together this year. Galbraith partnered Todd Witsken, losing in the quarterfinals. Jones partnered Rick Leach, losing in the first round.

Tom Nijssen and Cyril Suk won the title, defeating Steve DeVries and David Macpherson 7–6, 6–3 in the final.

== Seeds ==
1. (United States) Patrick Galbraith / (United States) Todd Witsken (quarterfinals)
2. (United States) Luke Jensen / (Australia) Laurie Warder (semifinals)
3. (United States) Kelly Jones / (United States) Rick Leach (first round)
4. (United Kingdom) Neil Broad / (South Africa) Danie Visser (quarterfinals)

== Draw ==
=== Key ===
- Q = Qualifier
- WC = Wild card
- LL = Lucky loser
- Alt = Alternate
- SE = Special exempt
- PR = Protected ranking
- ITF = ITF entry
- JE = Junior exempt
- w/o = Walkover
- r = Retired
- d = Defaulted
- SR = Special ranking

=== Draw ===
First round
1 | (United States) P Galbraith (United States) T Witsken | 5 | 6 | 6
(United States) J Brown (United States) S Melville | 7 | 4 | 4
(United States) S DeVries (Australia) D Macpherson | 7 | 7
(Iran) M Bahrami (Czechoslovakia) D Vacek | 5 | 6
3 | (United States) K Jones (United States) R Leach | 6 | 3
(United Kingdom) J Bates (United States) K Curren | 7 | 6
Q | (United States) J Kriek (Germany) C Saceanu | 6 | 6 | 1
(South Africa) S Kruger (South Africa) P Norval | 4 | 7 | 6
(United States) C Beckman (United States) S Salumaa | 5 | 6 | 5
(Netherlands) T Nijssen (Czechoslovakia) C Suk | 7 | 4 | 7
(United States) K Kinnear (United States) B Pearce | 7 | 6 | 4
4 | (United Kingdom) N Broad (South Africa) D Visser | 6 | 7 | 6
(Netherlands) HJ Davids (Belgium) L Pimek | 7 | 6
(Sweden) R Båthman (Sweden) R Bergh | 6 | 4
WC | (France) A Boetsch (France) G Forget | 7 | 3 | 3
2 | (United States) L Jensen (Australia) L Warder | 6 | 6 | 6

Quarterfinals
1 | (United States) P Galbraith (United States) T Witsken | 6 | 4
(United States) S DeVries (Australia) D Macpherson | 7 | 6
(United Kingdom) J Bates (United States) K Curren | 6 | 7
(South Africa) S Kruger (South Africa) P Norval | 4 | 5
(Netherlands) T Nijssen (Czechoslovakia) C Suk | 3 | 6 | 7
4 | (United Kingdom) N Broad (South Africa) D Visser | 6 | 3 | 6
(Netherlands) HJ Davids (Belgium) L Pimek | 2 | 4
2 | (United States) L Jensen (Australia) L Warder | 6 | 6

Semifinals
(United States) S DeVries (Australia) D Macpherson | 7 | 3 | 6
(United Kingdom) J Bates (United States) K Curren | 6 | 6 | 3
(Netherlands) T Nijssen (Czechoslovakia) C Suk | 4 | 7 | 6
2 | (United States) L Jensen (Australia) L Warder | 6 | 5 | 2

Final
(United States) S DeVries (Australia) D Macpherson | 6 | 3
(Netherlands) T Nijssen (Czechoslovakia) C Suk | 7 | 6
