= 1995 Grand Prix Passing Shot – Doubles =

Doubles
- 1995 Grand Prix Passing Shot

Final
- Champions: (Croatia) Saša Hiršzon (Croatia) Goran Ivanišević
- Runners-up: (Sweden) Henrik Holm (United Kingdom) Danny Sapsford
- Score: 6–3, 6–4

Details
- Draw: 16 (2WC/1Q)
- Seeds: 4

Events
Singles	Doubles
← 1994 ·	ATP Bordeaux

Olivier Delaître and Guy Forget were the defending champions, but Forget chose to compete at Bucharest during the same week. Delaitre teamed up with Jason Stoltenberg and lost in the first round to Marius Barnard and Dave Randall.

Saša Hiršzon and Goran Ivanišević won the title by defeating Henrik Holm and Danny Sapsford 6–3, 6–4 in the final.

== Seeds ==
1. (South Africa) Wayne Ferreira / (United States) Jim Grabb (semifinals)
2. (France) Rodolphe Gilbert / (France) Guillaume Raoux (first round)
3. (South Africa) Brent Haygarth / (United States) Kent Kinnear (first round)
4. (United States) Mike Bauer / (Germany) David Prinosil (quarterfinals)

== Draw ==
=== Key ===
- Q = Qualifier
- WC = Wild card
- LL = Lucky loser
- Alt = Alternate
- SE = Special exempt
- PR = Protected ranking
- ITF = ITF entry
- JE = Junior exempt
- w/o = Walkover
- r = Retired
- d = Defaulted
- SR = Special ranking

=== Draw ===
First round
1	(South Africa) W Ferreira (United States) J Grabb	7	6
(North Macedonia) A Kitinov (Netherlands) J Winnink	6	3
Q	(France) G Carraz (France) JB Perlant	3	6	3
(Sweden) R Bergh (Australia) J Ireland	6	3	6
4	(United States) M Bauer (Germany) D Prinosil	6	6
(Czech Republic) V Flégl (Kenya) P Wekesa	3	3
WC	(Haiti) R Agénor (France) H Leconte	3	6	4
(Sweden) H Holm (United Kingdom) D Sapsford	6	1	6
(South Africa) M Barnard (United States) D Randall	6	6
(France) O Delaître (Australia) J Stoltenberg	3	4
WC	(Croatia) S Hiršzon (Croatia) G Ivanišević	6	6	6
3	(South Africa) B Haygarth (United States) K Kinnear	7	4	3
(France) G Bastié (France) L Roux	2	1
(Portugal) N Marques (United States) J Waite	6	6
(Belgium) D Norman (United Kingdom) G Rusedski	6	6
2	(France) R Gilbert (France) G Raoux	3	2

Quarterfinals
1	(South Africa) W Ferreira (United States) J Grabb	6	7
(Sweden) R Bergh (Australia) J Ireland	4	5
4	(United States) M Bauer (Germany) D Prinosil	6	4	4
(Sweden) H Holm (United Kingdom) D Sapsford	4	6	6
(South Africa) M Barnard (United States) D Randall	2	4
WC	(Croatia) S Hiršzon (Croatia) G Ivanišević	6	6
(Portugal) N Marques (United States) J Waite	6	6	6
(Belgium) D Norman (United Kingdom) G Rusedski	7	4	4

Semifinals
1	(South Africa) W Ferreira (United States) J Grabb	7	5	4
(Sweden) H Holm (United Kingdom) D Sapsford	6	7	6
WC	(Croatia) S Hiršzon (Croatia) G Ivanišević	6	6
(Portugal) N Marques (United States) J Waite	3	4

Final
(Sweden) H Holm (United Kingdom) D Sapsford	3	4
WC	(Croatia) S Hiršzon (Croatia) G Ivanišević	6	6
