= 1992 Lyon Grand Prix – Singles =

Singles
- 1992 Lyon Grand Prix

Final
- Champion: (United States) Pete Sampras
- Runner-up: (France) Cédric Pioline
- Score: 6–4, 6–2

Details
- Draw: 32
- Seeds: 8

Events
Singles	Doubles
← 1991 ·	Lyon Grand Prix	· 1993 →

The 1992 Grand Prix de Tennis de Lyon – Singles was an event of the 1992 Grand Prix de Tennis de Lyon men's tennis tournament that was played at the Palais des Sports de Gerland in Lyon, France from 14 October until 21 October 1992. The draw comprised 32 players and eight were seeded. First-seeded Pete Sampras was the defending champion and regained his singles title, defeating unseeded Cédric Pioline, in the final, 6–4, 6–2.

== Seeds ==
1. (United States) Pete Sampras (champion)
2. (France) Guy Forget (second round)
3. (United States) MaliVai Washington (semifinals)
4. (Austria) Thomas Muster (second round)
5. (Czechoslovakia) Karel Nováček (quarterfinals)
6. (Germany) Carl-Uwe Steeb (second round)
7. (Italy) Omar Camporese (second round)
8. (Australia) Wally Masur (second round)

== Draw ==
=== Key ===
- Q = Qualifier
- WC = Wild card
- LL = Lucky loser
- Alt = Alternate
- ITF = ITF entry
- PR = Protected ranking
- SR = Special ranking
- SE = Special exempt
- JE = Junior exempt
- JR = Junior Accelerator Programme entrant
- CO = College Accelerator Programme entrant
- NG = Next Gen Accelerator Program entrant
- w/o = Walkover
- r = Retired
- d = Defaulted

=== Finals ===
Semifinals
1	(United States) Pete Sampras	6	6
3	(United States) MaliVai Washington	0	2
(United States) Richey Reneberg	2	7^{7}	5
(France) Cédric Pioline	6	6^{1}	7

Final
1	(United States) Pete Sampras	6	6
(France) Cédric Pioline	4	2

=== Top half ===
First round
1	(United States) P Sampras	7^{7}	6
(United States) J Tarango	6^{5}	3
(France) O Delaître	4	1
(Switzerland) M Rosset	6	6
(Germany) M Zoecke	6	6
(Netherlands) M Schapers	3	2
(Spain) F Roig	3	5
8	(Australia) W Masur	6	7
3	(United States) M Washington	6	6
(United States) P McEnroe	3	4
(Switzerland) J Hlasek	5	6	6
WC	(United States) D Rostagno	7	4	4
(Sweden) J Svensson	6	3	6^{3}
WC	(France) H Leconte	4	6	7^{7}
Q	(Belgium) F Cousin	2	6	1
5	(Czechoslovakia) K Nováček	6	3	6

Second round
1	(United States) P Sampras	6	3	6
(Switzerland) M Rosset	3	6	3
(Germany) M Zoecke	7^{7}	7^{7}
8	(Australia) W Masur	6^{4}	6^{5}
3	(United States) M Washington	6	6
(Switzerland) J Hlasek	3	4
WC	(France) H Leconte	4	4
5	(Czechoslovakia) K Nováček	6	6

Quarterfinals
1	(United States) P Sampras	6	6
(Germany) M Zoecke	4	3
3	(United States) M Washington	6	6
5	(Czechoslovakia) K Nováček	3	1

Semifinals
1	(United States) P Sampras	6	6
3	(United States) M Washington	0	2

=== Bottom half ===
First round
6	(Germany) C-U Steeb	7^{7}	7
SE	(France) S Simian	6^{4}	5
(United States) R Reneberg	7^{8}	6
WC	(France) L Roux	6^{6}	4
LL	(United States) D Randall	6	3	7^{7}
Q	(France) O Soules	3	6	6^{3}
(France) T Champion	2	4
4	(Austria) T Muster	6	6
7	(Italy) O Camporese	6	6
Q	(South Africa) R Koenig	2	2
(Belgium) B Wuyts	2	0
(France) A Boetsch	6	6
(Spain) T Carbonell	0	5
(France) C Pioline	6	7
(France) R Gilbert	3	7^{7}	6^{6}
2	(France) G Forget	6	6^{5}	7^{8}

Second round
6	(Germany) C-U Steeb	6^{3}	3
(United States) R Reneberg	7^{7}	6
LL	(United States) D Randall	7^{7}	6
4	(Austria) T Muster	6^{4}	4
7	(Italy) O Camporese	4	1
(France) A Boetsch	6	6
(France) C Pioline	7	6
2	(France) G Forget	5	4

Quarterfinals
(United States) R Reneberg	6	6
LL	(United States) D Randall	3	2
(France) A Boetsch	3	6	4
(France) C Pioline	6	1	6

Semifinals
(United States) R Reneberg	2	7^{7}	5
(France) C Pioline	6	6^{1}	7
