= 1995 Grand Prix Passing Shot =

- Date: 11–17 September
- Edition: 18th
- Category: World Series
- Draw: 32S / 16D
- Prize money: $375,000
- Surface: Hard / outdoor
- Location: Bordeaux, France
- Venue: Villa Primrose

Champions

Singles
- (Senegal) Yahiya Doumbia

Doubles
- (Croatia) Saša Hiršzon / (Croatia) Goran Ivanišević
- Bordeaux Open

The 1995 Grand Prix Passing Shot, also known as the Bordeaux Open, was a men's tennis tournament played on outdoor hard courts at Villa Primrose in Bordeaux, France that was part of the World Series of the 1995 ATP Tour. It was the 18th and last edition of the tournament and was held from 11 September until 17 September 1995. Qualifier Yahiya Doumbia won the singles title.

== Finals ==
=== Singles ===
(Senegal) Yahiya Doumbia defeated (Switzerland) Jakob Hlasek 6–4, 6–4

- It was Doumbia's 1st singles title of the year and 2nd of his career.

=== Doubles ===
(Croatia) Saša Hiršzon / (Croatia) Goran Ivanišević defeated (Sweden) Henrik Holm / (United Kingdom) Danny Sapsford 6–3, 6–4
