= 1993 Rado Swiss Open – Singles =

Singles
- 1993 Rado Swiss Open

Final
- Champion: (Spain) Sergi Bruguera
- Runner-up: (Czech Republic) Karel Nováček
- Score: 6–3, 6–4

Details
- Draw: 32 (3WC/4Q)
- Seeds: 8

Events
Singles	Doubles
- Swiss Open

Sergi Bruguera successfully defended his title by defeating Karel Nováček 6–3, 6–4 in the final.

== Seeds ==
1. (Spain) Sergi Bruguera (champion)
2. (Austria) Thomas Muster (semifinals)
3. (Czech Republic) Karel Nováček (final)
4. (Australia) Wally Masur (second round)
5. (France) Cédric Pioline (first round)
6. (France) Arnaud Boetsch (first round)
7. (Switzerland) Marc Rosset (second round)
8. (South Africa) Marcos Ondruska (second round)

== Draw ==
Key

- Q = Qualifier
- WC = Wild card
- LL = Lucky loser
- Alt = Alternate
- ITF = ITF entry
- PR = Protected ranking
- SR = Special ranking
- SE = Special exempt
- JE = Junior exempt
- JR = Junior Accelerator Programme entrant
- CO = College Accelerator Programme entrant
- NG = Next Gen Accelerator Program entrant
- w/o = Walkover
- r = Retired
- d = Defaulted

=== Finals ===
Semifinals
1	(Spain) Sergi Bruguera	6	6
(Germany) Marc-Kevin Goellner	3	0
3	(Czech Republic) Karel Nováček	6	7^{7}
2	(Austria) Thomas Muster	3	6^{5}

Final
1	(Spain) Sergi Bruguera	6	6
3	(Czech Republic) Karel Nováček	3	4

=== Top half ===
First round
1	(Spain) S Bruguera	6	6
(Germany) B Karbacher	4	0
(Italy) R Furlan	6	4	1
(Germany) M Zoecke	4	6	6
(Spain) À Corretja	6	5	6
WC	(Switzerland) C Mezzadri	2	7	3
Q	(France) G Marx	6	4	4
8	(South Africa) M Ondruska	4	6	6
4	(Australia) W Masur	6	7^{7}
(Germany) D Prinosil	3	6^{2}
Q	(France) G Solvès	7^{7}	3	6
(Argentina) R Azar	6^{4}	6	3
(Germany) MK Goellner	7^{7}	6
(Israel) A Mansdorf	6^{4}	4
(Germany) CU Steeb	6	2	6
6	(France) A Boetsch	4	6	4

Second round
1	(Spain) S Bruguera	6	7^{7}
(Germany) M Zoecke	4	6^{3}
(Spain) À Corretja	6	6
8	(South Africa) M Ondruska	4	3
4	(Australia) W Masur	6	3	6^{1}
Q	(France) G Solvès	3	6	7^{7}
(Germany) MK Goellner	7^{8}	6
(Germany) CU Steeb	6^{6}	4

Quarterfinals
1	(Spain) S Bruguera	6	6
(Spain) À Corretja	1	2
Q	(France) G Solvès	2	2
(Germany) MK Goellner	6	6

Semifinals
1	(Spain) S Bruguera	6	6
(Germany) MK Goellner	3	0

=== Bottom half ===
First round
5	(France) C Pioline	3	2
WC	(India) R Krishnan	6	6
Q	(Germany) M Naewie	6	6^{5}	6
WC	(Australia) J Fitzgerald	2	7^{7}	4
(Spain) C Costa	6	6
(Spain) F Clavet	3	0
Q	(Spain) S Gómez Barrio	1	1
3	(Czech Republic) K Nováček	6	6
7	(Switzerland) M Rosset	6	6
(Argentina) G Markus	1	2
(Australia) J Stoltenberg	7^{7}	4	6
(France) S Simian	6^{4}	6	2
(France) O Delaître	6^{6}	6	6^{3}
(France) R Gilbert	7^{8}	1	7^{7}
(Argentina) M Stringari	6	2	1
2	(Austria) T Muster	4	6	6

Second round
WC	(India) R Krishnan	6	4	0
Q	(Germany) M Naewie	4	6	6
(Spain) C Costa	4	6	4
3	(Czech Republic) K Nováček	6	3	6
7	(Switzerland) M Rosset	4	7^{7}	6^{5}
(Australia) J Stoltenberg	6	6^{3}	7^{7}
(France) R Gilbert	6	3	1
2	(Austria) T Muster	3	6	6

Quarterfinals
Q	(Germany) M Naewie	2	5
3	(Czech Republic) K Nováček	6	7
(Australia) J Stoltenberg	4	6^{2}
2	(Austria) T Muster	6	7^{7}

Semifinals
3	(Czech Republic) K Nováček	6	7^{7}
2	(Austria) T Muster	3	6^{5}
