= 1993 Rado Swiss Open – Doubles =

Doubles
- 1993 Rado Swiss Open

Final
- Champions: (France) Cédric Pioline (Switzerland) Marc Rosset
- Runners-up: (Netherlands) Hendrik Jan Davids (South Africa) Piet Norval
- Score: 6–3, 3–6, 7–6

Details
- Draw: 16 (2WC/1Q)
- Seeds: 4

Events
Singles	Doubles
- Swiss Open

Hendrik Jan Davids and Libor Pimek were the defending champions, but competed this year with different partners.

Pimek teamed up with Stefan Kruger and lost in the first round to Jorge Lozano and Udo Riglewski.

Davids teamed up with Piet Norval and lost in the final to tournament winners Cédric Pioline and Marc Rosset. The score was 6–3, 3–6, 7–6.

This tournament saw an unusual outcome, as all seeded pairs were eliminated in the first round.

== Seeds ==
1. (Australia) John Fitzgerald / (Australia) Todd Woodbridge (first round)
2. (Australia) Mark Kratzmann / (Australia) Wally Masur (first round)
3. (Czech Republic) Karel Nováček / (Czech Republic) Cyril Suk (first round)
4. (South Africa) Stefan Kruger / (Belgium) Libor Pimek (first round)

== Draw ==
Key

- Q = Qualifier
- WC = Wild card
- LL = Lucky loser
- Alt = Alternate
- ITF = ITF entry
- PR = Protected ranking
- SR = Special ranking
- SE = Special exempt
- JE = Junior exempt
- JR = Junior Accelerator Programme entrant
- CO = College Accelerator Programme entrant
- NG = Next Gen Accelerator Program entrant
- w/o = Walkover
- r = Retired
- d = Defaulted

=== Draw ===
First round
1	(Australia) J Fitzgerald (Australia) T Woodbridge	3	3
WC	(France) C Pioline (Switzerland) M Rosset	6	6
(Italy) C Brandi (Italy) F Mordegan	5	3
(United States) R Benson (Netherlands) M Schapers	7	6
4	(South Africa) S Kruger (Belgium) L Pimek	5	1
(Mexico) J Lozano (Germany) U Riglewski	7	6
(Czech Republic) V Flégl (Germany) B Karbacher	6	6
(Latvia) Ģ Dzelde (Australia) C Limberger	4	2
(South Africa) JL de Jager (South Africa) M Ondruska	7	7
Q	(Germany) J Renzenbrink (Netherlands) F Wibier	5	5
(United States) M Bauer (Germany) D Prinosil	4	6	7
3	(Czech Republic) K Nováček (Czech Republic) C Suk	6	2	6
(Netherlands) HJ Davids (South Africa) P Norval	6	7
WC	(Spain) À Corretja (Switzerland) C Mezzadri	4	6
(Spain) C Costa (Austria) T Muster	7	6	6
2	(Australia) M Kratzmann (Australia) W Masur	6	7	4

Quarterfinals
WC	(France) C Pioline (Switzerland) M Rosset	3	6	6
(United States) R Benson (Netherlands) M Schapers	6	3	2
(Mexico) J Lozano (Germany) U Riglewski	6	4	7
(Czech Republic) V Flégl (Germany) B Karbacher	1	6	6
(South Africa) JL de Jager (South Africa) M Ondruska	6	0	5
(United States) M Bauer (Germany) D Prinosil	3	6	7
(Netherlands) HJ Davids (South Africa) P Norval	7	6
(Spain) C Costa (Austria) T Muster	6	3

Semifinals
WC	(France) C Pioline (Switzerland) M Rosset	6	6
(Mexico) J Lozano (Germany) U Riglewski	4	4
(United States) M Bauer (Germany) D Prinosil	4	4
(Netherlands) HJ Davids (South Africa) P Norval	6	6

Final
WC	(France) C Pioline (Switzerland) M Rosset	6	3	7
(Netherlands) HJ Davids (South Africa) P Norval	3	6	6
