= 1994 Grand Prix Passing Shot – Doubles =

Doubles
- 1994 Grand Prix Passing Shot

Final
- Champions: (France) Olivier Delaître (France) Guy Forget
- Runners-up: (Italy) Diego Nargiso (France) Guillaume Raoux
- Score: 6–2, 2–6, 7–5

Events
Singles	Doubles
- ATP Bordeaux

Pablo Albano and Javier Frana were the defending champions, but none competed this year.

Olivier Delaître and Guy Forget won the title by defeating Diego Nargiso and Guillaume Raoux 6–2, 2–6, 7–5 in the final.

== Seeds ==
1. (South Africa) David Adams / (Russia) Andrei Olhovskiy (semifinals)
2. (Austria) Alex Antonitsch / (Russia) Yevgeny Kafelnikov (semifinals)
3. (South Africa) Marius Barnard / (South Africa) Brent Haygarth (first round)
4. (France) Olivier Delaître / (France) Guy Forget (champions)

== Draw ==
Key

- Q = Qualifier
- WC = Wild card
- LL = Lucky loser
- Alt = Alternate
- ITF = ITF entry
- PR = Protected ranking
- SR = Special ranking
- SE = Special exempt
- JE = Junior exempt
- JR = Junior Accelerator Programme entrant
- CO = College Accelerator Programme entrant
- NG = Next Gen Accelerator Program entrant
- w/o = Walkover
- r = Retired
- d = Defaulted

=== Draw ===
First round
1	(South Africa) D Adams (Russia) A Olhovskiy	6	6
WC	(France) L Barthez (France) O Soules	2	4
(Norway) BO Pedersen (United States) J Tarango	6	6
(Denmark) K Carlsen (Netherlands) J Siemerink	1	4
3	(South Africa) M Barnard (South Africa) B Haygarth	6	5
(United States) I Baron (South Africa) C Ferreira	7	7
(Italy) D Nargiso (France) G Raoux	6	6
WC	(Haiti) R Agénor (France) C Pioline	2	3
(United States) G Grant (United States) M Zimmerman	6	7
WC	(France) T Champion (France) D Courcol	2	5
(Italy) G Pozzi (United Kingdom) M Petchey	1	4
4	(France) O Delaître (France) G Forget	6	6
Q	(Germany) H Dreekmann (Germany) J Renzenbrink	3	2
(France) A Boetsch (Switzerland) J Hlasek	6	6
(France) R Gilbert (France) S Simian	6	6
2	(Austria) A Antonitsch (Russia) Y Kafelnikov	7	7

Quarterfinals
1	(South Africa) D Adams (Russia) A Olhovskiy	6	2	6
(Norway) BO Pedersen (United States) J Tarango	4	6	3
(United States) I Baron (South Africa) C Ferreira	3	6
(Italy) D Nargiso (France) G Raoux	6	7
(United States) G Grant (United States) M Zimmerman	5	1
4	(France) O Delaître (France) G Forget	7	6
(France) A Boetsch (Switzerland) J Hlasek	2	6
2	(Austria) A Antonitsch (Russia) Y Kafelnikov	6	7

Semifinals
1	(South Africa) D Adams (Russia) A Olhovskiy	4	2
(Italy) D Nargiso (France) G Raoux	6	6
4	(France) O Delaître (France) G Forget	6	3	6
2	(Austria) A Antonitsch (Russia) Y Kafelnikov	2	6	4

Final
(Italy) D Nargiso (France) G Raoux	2	6	5
4	(France) O Delaître (France) G Forget	6	2	7
