= 1988 Grand Prix de Tennis de Lyon – Singles =

Tennis tournament

Singles
- 1988 Grand Prix de Tennis de Lyon

Final
- Champion: (Senegal) Yahiya Doumbia
- Runner-up: (United States) Todd Nelson
- Score: 6–4, 3–6, 6–3

Details
- Draw: 32
- Seeds: 8

Events
Singles	Doubles
← 1987 ·	Grand Prix de Tennis de Lyon	· 1989 →

The 1988 Grand Prix de Tennis de Lyon – Singles was an event of the 1988 Grand Prix de Tennis de Lyon men's tennis tournament that was played at the Palais des Sports de Gerland in Lyon, France from 8 February until 15 February 1988. The draw comprised 32 players and eight were seeded. First-seeded Yannick Noah was the defending champion, but lost in the semifinals. Unseeded Yahiya Doumbia won the singles title, defeating unseeded Todd Nelson, who entered the main draw as a qualifier, in the final, 6–4, 3–6, 6–3.

== Seeds ==
1. (France) Yannick Noah (semifinals)
2. (Soviet Union) Andrei Chesnokov (first round)
3. (New Zealand) Kelly Evernden (quarterfinals)
4. (France) Guy Forget (second round)
5. (United States) Scott Davis (second round)
6. (France) Thierry Tulasne (second round)
7. (France) Tarik Benhabiles (first round)
8. (United Kingdom) Jeremy Bates (quarterfinals)

== Draw ==
=== Key ===
- Q = Qualifier
- WC = Wild card
- LL = Lucky loser
- Alt = Alternate
- SE = Special exempt
- PR = Protected ranking
- ITF = ITF entry
- JE = Junior exempt
- w/o = Walkover
- r = Retired
- d = Defaulted
- SR = Special ranking

=== Finals ===
Semifinals
1	(France) Yannick Noah	6	3
(United States) Todd Nelson	7	6
Q	(Belgium) Eduardo Masso	4	6
Q	(Senegal) Yahiya Doumbia	6	7

Final
(United States) Todd Nelson	4	6	3
Q	(Senegal) Yahiya Doumbia	6	3	6

=== Top half ===
First round
1	(France) Y Noah	6	6	6
(United States) K Jones	7	2	4
(West Germany) W Popp	4	4
(West Germany) D Keretić	6	6
(Czechoslovakia) P Korda	7	4	4
WC	(France) T Pham	6	6	6
(Australia) B Dyke	6	6
7	(France) T Benhabiles	4	4
4	(France) G Forget	7	6
(United States) J Brown	6	4
(United States) T Nelson	6	6
(Austria) A Antonitsch	4	3
(Italy) G Pozzi	3	6	5
WC	(France) P Pech	6	3	7
(Australia) B Drewett	6	7	5
6	(France) T Tulasne	7	6	7

Second round
1	(France) Y Noah	6	6
(West Germany) D Keretić	3	4
WC	(France) T Pham	1	1
(Australia) B Dyke	6	6
4	(France) G Forget	3	4
(United States) T Nelson	6	6
WC	(France) P Pech	6	7	6
6	(France) T Tulasne	7	5	2

Quarterfinals
1	(France) Y Noah	6	6
(Australia) B Dyke	4	2
(United States) T Nelson	6	7
WC	(France) P Pech	2	6

Semifinals
1	(France) Y Noah	6	3
(United States) T Nelson	7	6

=== Bottom half ===
First round
5	(United States) S Davis	6	7
(Israel) G Bloom	1	6
Q	(France) Remi Gilberton	1	3
Q	(Belgium) E Masso	6	6
(United States) B Scanlon	6	6
(Nigeria) N Odizor	4	2
(Canada) M Laurendeau	4	5
3	(New Zealand) K Evernden	6	7
8	(United Kingdom) J Bates	7	6
(France) É Winogradsky	6	3
(United States) M Flur	7	6
WC	(Iran) M Bahrami	6	3
(France) J Poitier	7	4	6
(United States) B Willenborg	6	6	0
Q	(Senegal) Y Doumbia	7	7
2	(Soviet Union) A Chesnokov	6	6

Second round
5	(United States) S Davis	4	5
Q	(Belgium) E Masso	6	7
(United States) B Scanlon	4	6
3	(New Zealand) K Evernden	6	7
8	(United Kingdom) J Bates	6	6
(United States) M Flur	1	4
(France) J Poitier	7	3	1
Q	(Senegal) Y Doumbia	6	6	6

Quarterfinals
Q	(Belgium) E Masso	6	5	7
3	(New Zealand) K Evernden	4	7	6
8	(United Kingdom) J Bates	3	5
Q	(Senegal) Y Doumbia	6	7

Semifinals
Q	(Belgium) E Masso	4	6
Q	(Senegal) Y Doumbia	6	7
