= 1990 Grand Prix de Tennis de Lyon – Doubles =

Doubles
- 1990 Grand Prix de Tennis de Lyon

Final
- Champions: (United States) Patrick Galbraith (United States) Kelly Jones
- Runners-up: (United States) Jim Grabb (United States) David Pate
- Score: 7–6, 6–4

Details
- Draw: 16
- Seeds: 4

Events
Singles	Doubles
← 1989 ·	Grand Prix de Tennis de Lyon	· 1991 →

Eric Jelen and Michael Mortensen were the defending champions, but Jelen did not participate this year. Mortensen partnered Gustavo Luza, losing in the first round.

Patrick Galbraith and Kelly Jones won the title, defeating Jim Grabb and David Pate 7–6, 6–4 in the final.

== Seeds ==
1. (South Africa) Pieter Aldrich / (South Africa) Danie Visser (quarterfinals)
2. (United Kingdom) Neil Broad / (South Africa) Gary Muller (semifinals)
3. (United States) Patrick Galbraith / (United States) Kelly Jones (champions)
4. (United States) Jim Grabb / (United States) David Pate (final)

== Draw ==
=== Key ===
- Q = Qualifier
- WC = Wild card
- LL = Lucky loser
- Alt = Alternate
- SE = Special exempt
- PR = Protected ranking
- ITF = ITF entry
- JE = Junior exempt
- w/o = Walkover
- r = Retired
- d = Defaulted
- SR = Special ranking

=== Draw ===
First round
1	(South Africa) P Aldrich (South Africa) D Visser	6	6
(Czechoslovakia) T Šmíd (Czechoslovakia) C Suk	3	3
(Argentina) G Luza (Denmark) M Mortensen	3	7	6
WC	(France) Y Noah (France) F Santoro	6	5	7
3	(United States) P Galbraith (United States) K Jones	6	6
(United States) T Nelson (United States) B Shelton	3	4
Q	(South Africa) W Ferreira (South Africa) P Norval	6	6	6
(United States) C Beckman (United States) L Jensen	4	7	3
(United States) S DeVries (Australia) D Macpherson	4	6	6
(Sweden) R Båthman (Sweden) R Bergh	6	3	1
(Australia) B Dyke (Australia) L Warder	4	7	4
4	(United States) J Grabb (United States) D Pate	6	6	6
(South Africa) S Kruger (Australia) S Youl	6	6
(Italy) D Nargiso (Nigeria) N Odizor	4	4
(Iran) M Bahrami (France) É Winogradsky	6	7	3
2	(United Kingdom) N Broad (South Africa) G Muller	7	6	6

Quarterfinals
1	(South Africa) P Aldrich (South Africa) D Visser	2	6
WC	(France) Y Noah (France) F Santoro	6	7
3	(United States) P Galbraith (United States) K Jones	6	7
Q	(South Africa) W Ferreira (South Africa) P Norval	4	5
(United States) S DeVries (Australia) D Macpherson	5	6
4	(United States) J Grabb (United States) D Pate	7	7
(South Africa) S Kruger (Australia) S Youl	6	4
2	(United Kingdom) N Broad (South Africa) G Muller	7	6

Semifinals
WC	(France) Y Noah (France) F Santoro	6	2
3	(United States) P Galbraith (United States) K Jones	7	6
4	(United States) J Grabb (United States) D Pate	7	4	7
2	(United Kingdom) N Broad (South Africa) G Muller	6	6	6

Final
3	(United States) P Galbraith (United States) K Jones	7	6
4	(United States) J Grabb (United States) D Pate	6	4
