= 1989 Grand Prix de Tennis de Lyon – Doubles =

Doubles
- 1989 Grand Prix de Tennis de Lyon

Final
- Champions: (West Germany) Eric Jelen (Denmark) Michael Mortensen
- Runners-up: (Switzerland) Jakob Hlasek (United States) John McEnroe
- Score: 6–2, 3–6, 6–3

Details
- Draw: 16
- Seeds: 4

Events
Singles	Doubles
← 1988 ·	Grand Prix de Tennis de Lyon	· 1990 →

Brad Drewett and Broderick Dyke were the defending champions but did not compete that year.

Eric Jelen and Michael Mortensen won in the final 6–2, 3–6, 6–3 against Jakob Hlasek and John McEnroe.

== Seeds ==
1. (Switzerland) Jakob Hlasek / (United States) John McEnroe (final)
2. (West Germany) Eric Jelen / (Denmark) Michael Mortensen (champions)
3. (West Germany) Patrick Baur / (Sweden) Rikard Bergh (first round)
4. (Sweden) Niclas Kroon / (Sweden) Peter Lundgren (first round)

== Draw ==
=== Key ===
- Q = Qualifier
- WC = Wild card
- LL = Lucky loser
- Alt = Alternate
- SE = Special exempt
- PR = Protected ranking
- ITF = ITF entry
- JE = Junior exempt
- w/o = Walkover
- r = Retired
- d = Defaulted
- SR = Special ranking

First round
1	(Switzerland) J Hlasek (United States) J McEnroe	6	7
(France) J Potier (West Germany) C Saceanu	3	6
(Iran) M Bahrami (France) E Winogradsky	6	3
(West Germany) P Kühnen (West Germany) C-U Steeb	7	6
3	(West Germany) P Baur (Sweden) R Bergh	2	6	4
(France) A Boetsch (France) T Champion	6	4	6
(Switzerland) H Günthardt (Hungary) B Taróczy	4	6	6
(France) O Delaître (Canada) M Laurendeau	6	3	7
(Sweden) M Gustafsson (Finland) O Rahnasto	6	6
(United States) R Baxter (United States) M De Palmer	2	2
(United States) R Matuszewski (Netherlands) M Schapers	7	6
4	(Sweden) N Kroon (Sweden) P Lundgren	6	3
(Portugal) J Cunha e Silva (Belgium) E Masso	6	6
(United States) P Chamberlin (United States) T Nelson	4	4
(Switzerland) C Mezzadri (Italy) D Nargiso	6	4
2	(West Germany) E Jelen (Denmark) M Mortensen	7	6

Quarterfinals
1	(Switzerland) J Hlasek (United States) J McEnroe	7	6
(West Germany) P Kühnen (West Germany) C-U Steeb	5	3
(France) A Boetsch (France) T Champion	4	6	6
(France) O Delaître (Canada) M Laurendeau	6	3	7
(Sweden) M Gustafsson (Finland) O Rahnasto	6	6
(United States) R Matuszewski (Netherlands) M Schapers	7	7
(Portugal) J Cunha e Silva (Belgium) E Masso	3	7	3
2	(West Germany) E Jelen (Denmark) M Mortensen	6	6	6

Semifinals
1	(Switzerland) J Hlasek (United States) J McEnroe	6	6
(France) O Delaître (Canada) M Laurendeau	3	4
(United States) R Matuszewski (Netherlands) M Schapers	7	3	4
2	(West Germany) E Jelen (Denmark) M Mortensen	6	6	6

Final
1	(Switzerland) J Hlasek (United States) J McEnroe	2	6	3
2	(West Germany) E Jelen (Denmark) M Mortensen	6	3	6
