= 1994 Grand Prix Passing Shot =

Tennis tournament

- Date: 12–18 September
- Edition: 17th
- Category: World Series
- Draw: 32S / 16D
- Prize money: $375,000
- Surface: Hard / outdoor
- Location: Bordeaux, France
- Venue: Villa Primrose

Champions

Singles
- (South Africa) Wayne Ferreira

Doubles
- (France) Olivier Delaître / (France) Guy Forget
- Bordeaux Open

The 1994 Grand Prix Passing Shot, also known as the Bordeaux Open, was a men's tennis tournament played on outdoor hard courts at Villa Primrose in Bordeaux, France that was part of the World Series of the 1994 ATP Tour. It was the 17th edition of the tournament and was held from 12 September until 18 September 1994. Second-seeded Wayne Ferreira won the singles title.

== Finals ==
=== Singles ===
(South Africa) Wayne Ferreira defeated (United States) Jeff Tarango 6–0, 7–5

- It was Ferreira's 3rd singles title of the year and 5th of his career.

=== Doubles ===
(France) Olivier Delaître / (France) Guy Forget defeated (Italy) Diego Nargiso / (France) Guillaume Raoux 6–2, 2–6, 7–5
