= 1993 Grand Prix de Tennis de Lyon – Doubles =

Doubles
- 1993 Grand Prix de Tennis de Lyon

Final
- Champions: (South Africa) Gary Muller (South Africa) Danie Visser
- Runners-up: (South Africa) John-Laffnie De Jager (South Africa) Stefan Kruger
- Score: 6–3, 7–6

Details
- Draw: 16
- Seeds: 4

Events
Singles	Doubles
← 1992 ·	Grand Prix de Tennis de Lyon	· 1994 →

Jakob Hlasek and Marc Rosset were the defending champions, but Rosset did not participate this year. Hlasek partnered Michiel Schapers, losing in the first round.

Gary Muller and Danie Visser won the title, defeating John-Laffnie De Jager and Stefan Kruger 6–3, 7–6 in the final.

== Seeds ==
1. (Netherlands) Tom Nijssen / (Czech Republic) Cyril Suk (quarterfinals)
2. (South Africa) David Adams / (Russia) Andrei Olhovskiy (first round)
3. (South Africa) Gary Muller / (South Africa) Danie Visser (champions)
4. (United States) Steve DeVries / (Australia) David Macpherson (first round)

== Draw ==
=== Key ===
- Q = Qualifier
- WC = Wild card
- LL = Lucky loser
- Alt = Alternate
- SE = Special exempt
- PR = Protected ranking
- ITF = ITF entry
- JE = Junior exempt
- w/o = Walkover
- r = Retired
- d = Defaulted
- SR = Special ranking

=== Draw ===
First round
1	(Netherlands) T Nijssen (Czech Republic) C Suk	7	6
(Netherlands) HJ Davids (South Africa) P Norval	6	2
(United States) S Cannon (United States) S Melville	5	6	7
(United States) B Pearce (United States) D Randall	7	4	6
3	(South Africa) G Muller (South Africa) D Visser	6	7
(United States) K Kinnear (Australia) L Warder	3	5
WC	(Germany) U Riglewski (Germany) M Stich	7	5	5
(Czech Republic) M Damm (Czech Republic) D Vacek	6	7	7
(South Africa) J-L de Jager (South Africa) S Kruger	6	6
Q	(Switzerland) J Hlasek (Netherlands) M Schapers	1	3
(Germany) P Kühnen (Netherlands) M Oosting	6	6
4	(United States) S DeVries (Australia) D Macpherson	3	3
WC	(United States) P Sampras (United States) D Wheaton	6	3
(Mexico) J Lozano (Belgium) L Pimek	7	6
(France) O Delaître (Italy) D Nargiso	6	6
2	(South Africa) D Adams (Russia) A Olhovskiy	4	4

Quarterfinals
1	(Netherlands) T Nijssen (Czech Republic) C Suk	3	6	6
(United States) S Cannon (United States) S Melville	6	3	7
3	(South Africa) G Muller (South Africa) D Visser	2	7	7
(Czech Republic) M Damm (Czech Republic) D Vacek	6	6	5
(South Africa) J-L de Jager (South Africa) S Kruger	3	6	6
(Germany) P Kühnen (Netherlands) M Oosting	6	3	4
(Mexico) J Lozano (Belgium) L Pimek	6	7
(France) O Delaître (Italy) D Nargiso	3	6

Semifinals
(United States) S Cannon (United States) S Melville	6	5
3	(South Africa) G Muller (South Africa) D Visser	7	7
(South Africa) J-L de Jager (South Africa) S Kruger	6	6	6
(Mexico) J Lozano (Belgium) L Pimek	7	4	2

Final
3	(South Africa) G Muller (South Africa) D Visser	6	7
(South Africa) J-L de Jager (South Africa) S Kruger	3	6
