= 1994 Grand Prix de Tennis de Lyon =

- Date: 17–24 October 1994
- Edition: 8th
- Category: World Series
- Draw: 32S / 16D
- Prize money: $575,000
- Surface: Carpet / indoor
- Location: Lyon, France
- Venue: Palais des Sports de Gerland

Champions

Singles
- (Switzerland) Marc Rosset

Doubles
- (Switzerland) Jakob Hlasek / (Russia) Yevgeny Kafelnikov
← 1993 ·	Grand Prix de Tennis de Lyon	· 1995 →

The 1994 Grand Prix de Tennis de Lyon was a men's tennis tournament played on indoor carpet courts at the Palais des Sports de Gerland in Lyon, France, and was part of the World Series of the 1994 ATP Tour. It was the eighth edition of the tournament and ran from 17 October through 24 October 1994. Fifth-seeded Marc Rosset won the singles title, his second after 1990.

== Finals ==
=== Singles ===
(Switzerland) Marc Rosset defeated (United States) Jim Courier 6–4, 7–6^{(7–2)}

- It was Rosset's 2nd title of the year and the 15th of his career.

=== Doubles ===
(Switzerland) Jakob Hlasek / (Russia) Yevgeny Kafelnikov defeated (Czech Republic) Martin Damm / (Australia) Patrick Rafter 6–7, 7–6, 7–6

- It was Hlasek's only title of the year and the 24th of his career. It was Kafelnikov's 7th title of the year and the 7th of his career.
