= Philippe Pech =

French tennis player

- Country (sports): France
- Born: 9 August 1966 (age 58); Grenoble, France
- Height: 1.80 m (5 ft 11 in)
- Plays: Left-handed
- Prize money: $101,424

Singles
- Career record: 5–11
- Career titles: 0
- Highest ranking: No. 155 (11 December 1989)

Grand Slam singles results
- French Open: 1R (1988)

Doubles
- Career record: 1–2
- Career titles: 0
- Highest ranking: No. 337 (23 March 1987)

Grand Slam doubles results
- French Open: 1R (1988)

Philippe Pech (born 9 August 1966) is a French former professional tennis player.

== Career ==
Pech made his only Grand Slam appearance at the 1988 French Open. He lost in the opening round to top seed Ivan Lendl, in straight sets. In the men's doubles he and partner Tarik Benhabiles were beaten in the first round.

He was a quarter-finalist in the 1988 Grand Prix de Tennis de Lyon tournament, which was his best performance in a Grand Prix event, along with a win over Patrick McEnroe in the 1992 Stella Artois Championships and when he upset world number 26 Marc Rosset in the 1993 Manchester Open.
