= 1987 Grand Prix de Tennis de Lyon – Doubles =

Doubles
- 1987 Grand Prix de Tennis de Lyon

Final
- Champions: (France) Guy Forget (France) Yannick Noah
- Runners-up: (United States) Kelly Jones (United States) David Pate
- Score: 4–6, 6–3, 6–4

Details
- Draw: 16
- Seeds: 4

Events
Singles	Doubles
Grand Prix de Tennis de Lyon	· 1988 →

This was the first edition of the tournament.

Guy Forget and Yannick Noah won the title, defeating Kelly Jones and David Pate 4–6, 6–3, 6–4 in the final.

== Seeds ==
1. (France) Guy Forget / (France) Yannick Noah (champions)
2. (United States) Kelly Jones / (United States) David Pate (final)
3. (Sweden) Peter Lundgren / (Sweden) Joakim Nyström (semifinals)
4. (Denmark) Michael Mortensen / (United States) Todd Nelson (quarterfinals)

== Draw ==
=== Key ===
- Q = Qualifier
- WC = Wild card
- LL = Lucky loser
- Alt = Alternate
- SE = Special exempt
- PR = Protected ranking
- ITF = ITF entry
- JE = Junior exempt
- w/o = Walkover
- r = Retired
- d = Defaulted
- SR = Special ranking

=== Draw ===
First round
1	(France) G Forget (France) Y Noah	6	6
(Belgium) L Pimek (Czechoslovakia) M Vajda	4	4
(West Germany) A Maurer (Sweden) J Windahl	2	6	5
(France) T Pham (United States) Francois Servelle	6	4	7
3	(Sweden) P Lundgren (Sweden) J Nyström	6	6
(Switzerland) C Mezzadri (Switzerland) R Stadler	2	1
(Haiti) R Agénor (France) T Benhabiles	6	6
(France) B Dadillon (France) C Lesage	3	4
(Israel) G Bloom (Israel) S Perkiss	6	6
(Australia) T Allan (New Zealand) S Guy	3	2
(United States) CB Cox (United States) L Shiras	3	7	3
4	(Denmark) M Mortensen (United States) T Nelson	6	6	6
(United States) J Grabb (United States) B Willenborg	6	3	6
(France) A Boetsch (France) J Potier	4	6	4
WC	(France) T Champion (France) T Tulasne	3	6	3
2	(United States) K Jones (United States) D Pate	6	4	6

Quarterfinals
1	(France) G Forget (France) Y Noah	6	6
(France) T Pham (United States) Francois Servelle	4	2
3	(Sweden) P Lundgren (Sweden) J Nyström	7	7
(Haiti) R Agénor (France) T Benhabiles	5	6
(Israel) G Bloom (Israel) S Perkiss	3	6	6
4	(Denmark) M Mortensen (United States) T Nelson	6	4	4
(United States) J Grabb (United States) B Willenborg	7	3	4
2	(United States) K Jones (United States) D Pate	5	6	6

Semifinals
1	(France) G Forget (France) Y Noah	6	6
3	(Sweden) P Lundgren (Sweden) J Nyström	2	2
(Israel) G Bloom (Israel) S Perkiss	3	6
2	(United States) K Jones (United States) D Pate	6	7

Final
1	(France) G Forget (France) Y Noah	4	6	6
2	(United States) K Jones (United States) D Pate	6	3	4
