= 1987 Grand Prix de Tennis de Lyon – Singles =

Singles
- 1987 Grand Prix de Tennis de Lyon

Final
- Champion: (France) Yannick Noah
- Runner-up: (Sweden) Joakim Nyström
- Score: 6–4, 7–5

Details
- Draw: 32
- Seeds: 8

Events
Singles	Doubles
Grand Prix de Tennis de Lyon	· 1988 →

The 1987 Grand Prix de Tennis de Lyon – Singles was an event of the 1987 Grand Prix de Tennis de Lyon men's tennis tournament that was played at the Palais des Sports de Gerland in Lyon, France from 2 February until 9 February 1987. The draw comprised 32 players and eight were seeded. First-seeded Yannick Noah, who entered on the main draw on a wildcard, won the singles title, defeating second-seeded Joakim Nyström in the final, 6–4, 7–5.

== Seeds ==
1. (France) Yannick Noah (champion)
2. (Sweden) Joakim Nyström (final)
3. (France) Thierry Tulasne (second round)
4. (France) Guy Forget (quarterfinals)
5. (United States) David Pate (first round)
6. (France) Tarik Benhabiles (first round)
7. (West Germany) Andreas Maurer (first round)
8. (Belgium) Libor Pimek (second round)

== Draw ==
=== Key ===
- Q = Qualifier
- WC = Wild card
- LL = Lucky loser
- Alt = Alternate
- SE = Special exempt
- PR = Protected ranking
- ITF = ITF entry
- JE = Junior exempt
- w/o = Walkover
- r = Retired
- d = Defaulted
- SR = Special ranking

=== Finals ===
Semifinals
WC/1	(France) Yannick Noah	1	6	6
(United States) Kelly Jones	6	1	1
(United States) Todd Nelson	6	6	6
2	(Sweden) Joakim Nyström	7	4	7

Final
WC/1	(France) Yannick Noah	6	7
2	(Sweden) Joakim Nyström	4	5

=== Top half ===
First round
WC/1	(France) Y Noah	6	6
(Italy) C Panatta	1	3
WC	(France) T Pham	4	2
Q	(France) A Boetsch	6	6
WC	(France) R Gilbert	4	1
(United States) B Willenborg	6	6
(Switzerland) R Stadler	2	2
8	(Belgium) L Pimek	6	6
4	(France) G Forget	6	1
(Switzerland) C Mezzadri	1	0^{r}
(United States) J Grabb	3	4
(Israel) S Perkiss	6	6
(United States) K Jones	6	7
(Czechoslovakia) M Vajda	1	6
(Sweden) P Lundgren	6	6	6
6	(France) T Benhabiles	7	4	3

Second round
WC/1	(France) Y Noah	7	7
Q	(France) A Boetsch	6	5
(United States) B Willenborg	6	6
8	(Belgium) L Pimek	4	4
4	(France) G Forget	6	4	6
(Israel) S Perkiss	3	6	4
(United States) K Jones	6	6
(Sweden) P Lundgren	4	2

Quarterfinals
WC/1	(France) Y Noah	6	6
(United States) B Willenborg	2	3
4	(France) G Forget	7	4	6
(United States) K Jones	5	6	7

Semifinals
WC/1	(France) Y Noah	1	6	6
(United States) K Jones	6	1	1

=== Bottom half ===
First round
5	(United States) D Pate	4	6	6
(Sweden) S Eriksson	6	1	7
(United States) T Nelson	6	6
(Sweden) J Windahl	1	4
Q	(France) Pierre Lemoine	2	4
(United States) B Cox	6	6
(Israel) G Bloom	7	3	6
3	(France) T Tulasne	5	6	7
7	(West Germany) A Maurer	4	3
Q	(France) J Potier	6	6
(Sweden) T Högstedt	3	3
(United States) L Shiras	6	6
(New Zealand) S Guy	3	3
Q	(Haiti) R Agénor	6	6
(France) T Champion	0	4
2	(Sweden) J Nyström	6	6

Second round
(Sweden) S Eriksson	3	6
(United States) T Nelson	6	7
(United States) B Cox	7	3	7
3	(France) T Tulasne	6	6	6
Q	(France) J Potier	7	2	7
(United States) L Shiras	6	6	5
Q	(Haiti) R Agénor	1	7	4
2	(Sweden) J Nyström	6	5	6

Quarterfinals
(United States) T Nelson	7	6
(United States) B Cox	6	2
Q	(France) J Potier	3	4
2	(Sweden) J Nyström	6	6

Semifinals
(United States) T Nelson	6	6	6
2	(Sweden) J Nyström	7	4	7
