= 1992 Lyon Grand Prix =

- Date: 19–26 October 1992
- Edition: 6th
- Category: ATP World Series
- Draw: 32S / 16D
- Prize money: $550,000
- Surface: Carpet / indoor
- Location: Lyon, France
- Venue: Palais des Sports de Gerland

Champions

Singles
- (United States) Pete Sampras

Doubles
- (Switzerland) Jakob Hlasek / (Switzerland) Marc Rosset
← 1991 ·	Lyon Grand Prix	· 1993 →

The 1992 Lyon Grand Prix was a men's tennis tournament played on indoor carpet courts. It was played at the Palais des Sports de Gerland in Lyon, France, and was part of the 1992 ATP Tour. It was the sixth edition of the tournament and took place from 19 October through 26 October 1992. First-seeded Pete Sampras won the singles title, his second consecutive at the event.

== Finals ==
=== Singles ===
(United States) Pete Sampras defeated (France) Cédric Pioline 6–4, 6–2

- It was Sampras' 5th singles title of the year and the 13th of his career.

=== Doubles ===
(Switzerland) Jakob Hlasek / (Switzerland) Marc Rosset defeated (United Kingdom) Neil Broad / (South Africa) Stefan Kruger 6–1, 6–3

- It was Hlasek's 3rd title of the year and the 23rd of his career. It was Rosset's 5th title of the year and the 8th of his career.
