= 1989 Grand Prix de Tennis de Lyon =

Men's tennis tournament

- Date: 20–27 February 1989
- Edition: 3rd
- Category: Grand Prix circuit
- Draw: 32S / 16D
- Prize money: $261,000
- Surface: Carpet / indoor
- Location: Lyon, France
- Venue: Palais des Sports de Gerland

Champions

Singles
- (United States) John McEnroe

Doubles
- (West Germany) Eric Jelen / (Denmark) Michael Mortensen
- Grand Prix de Tennis de Lyon

The 1989 Grand Prix de Tennis de Lyon was a men's tennis tournament played on indoor carpet courts at the Palais des Sports de Gerland in Lyon, France, and was part of the 1989 Nabisco Grand Prix. It was the third edition of the tournament and was held from 20 February through 27 February 1989. Second-seeded John McEnroe won the singles title.

== Finals ==
=== Singles ===
(United States) John McEnroe defeated (Switzerland) Jakob Hlasek 6–3, 7–6

- It was McEnroe's 1st singles title of the year and the 73rd of his career.

=== Doubles ===
(West Germany) Eric Jelen / (Denmark) Michael Mortensen defeated (Switzerland) Jakob Hlasek / (United States) John McEnroe 6–2, 3–6, 6–3

- It was Jelen's 1st title of the year and the 3rd of his career. It was Mortensen's only title of the year and the 5th of his career.
