= 1988 Grand Prix de Tennis de Lyon =

- Date: 8–15 February 1988
- Edition: 2nd
- Category: Grand Prix circuit
- Draw: 32S / 16D
- Prize money: $240,000
- Surface: Carpet / indoor
- Location: Lyon, France
- Venue: Palais des Sports de Gerland

Champions

Singles
- (Senegal) Yahiya Doumbia

Doubles
- (Australia) Brad Drewett / (Australia) Broderick Dyke
- Grand Prix de Tennis de Lyon

The 1988 Grand Prix de Tennis de Lyon was a men's tennis tournament played on indoor carpet courts at the Palais des Sports de Gerland in Lyon, France, and was part of the 1988 Nabisco Grand Prix. It was the second edition of the tournament and was held from 8 February through 15 February 1988. Unseeded qualifier Yahiya Doumbia won the singles title.

== Finals ==
=== Singles ===
(Senegal) Yahiya Doumbia defeated (United States) Todd Nelson 6–4, 3–6, 6–3

- It was Doumbia's only singles title of the year and the 1st of his career.

=== Doubles ===
(Australia) Brad Drewett / (Australia) Broderick Dyke defeated (Denmark) Michael Mortensen / (United States) Blaine Willenborg 3–6, 6–3, 6–4

- It was Drewett's only doubles title of the year and the 7th and last of his career. It was Dyke's only doubles title of the year and the 6th of his career.
