= 1991 Grand Prix de Tennis de Lyon =

- Date: 14–21 October 1991
- Edition: 5th
- Category: ATP World Series
- Draw: 32S / 16D
- Prize money: $450,000
- Surface: Carpet / indoor
- Location: Lyon, France
- Venue: Palais des Sports de Gerland

Champions

Singles
- (United States) Pete Sampras

Doubles
- (Netherlands) Tom Nijssen / (Czechoslovakia) Cyril Suk
- Grand Prix de Tennis de Lyon

The 1991 Grand Prix de Tennis de Lyon was a men's tennis tournament played on indoor carpet courts at the Palais des Sports de Gerland in Lyon, France, and was part of the World Series of the 1991 ATP Tour. It was the fifth edition of the tournament and was held from 14 October through 21 October 1991. Second-seeded Pete Sampras won the singles title.

== Finals ==
=== Singles ===
(United States) Pete Sampras defeated (France) Olivier Delaître 6–1, 6–1

- It was Sampras' 3rd singles title of the year and the 7th of his career.

=== Doubles ===
(Netherlands) Tom Nijssen / (Czechoslovakia) Cyril Suk defeated (United States) Steve DeVries / (Australia) David Macpherson 7–6, 6–3

- It was Nijssen's 2nd title of the year and the 6th of his career. It was Suk's 3rd title of the year and the 4th of his career.
