= Yahiya Doumbia =

Senegalese tennis player (born 1963)

- Country (sports): Senegal
- Residence: Paris, France
- Born: 25 August 1963 (age 63) Bamako, Mali
- Height: 1.85 m (6 ft 1 in)
- Turned pro: 1986
- Retired: 1997
- Plays: Right-handed (one-handed backhand)
- Prize money: $287,231

Singles
- Career record: 24–34
- Career titles: 2
- Highest ranking: No. 74 (19 September 1988)

Grand Slam singles results
- French Open: 1R (1988)
- Wimbledon: 1R (1988)
- US Open: 1R (1988, 1989)

Doubles
- Career record: 4–19
- Career titles: 0
- Highest ranking: No. 187 (6 July 1987)

Grand Slam doubles results
- Wimbledon: Q3 (1992)
- Last updated on: 15 March 2022.

Yahiya Doumbia (born 25 August 1963) is a retired professional tennis player from Senegal. He won two singles titles during his career on the ATP Tour, both as a qualifier. He reached a career-high singles ranking of No. 74 in 1988. Doumbia played for the Senegal Davis Cup team, and holds team records for singles wins, doubles wins, and total wins, amassing a 44-19 record in 11 years of play.

== ATP career finals ==
=== Singles: 2 (2 titles) ===
Legend Grand Slam Tournaments (0–0) ATP World Tour Finals (0–0) ATP Masters Series (0–0) ATP Championship Series (0–0) ATP World Series (2–0)	Finals by surface Hard (1–0) Clay (0–0) Grass (0–0) Carpet (1–0)	Finals by setting Outdoors (1–0) Indoors (1–0)

Result	W–L	Date	Tournament	Tier	Surface	Opponent	Score
Win	1–0	Feb 1988	Lyon, France	Grand Prix	Carpet	(United States) Todd Nelson	6–4, 3–6, 6–3
Win	2–0	Sep 1995	Bordeaux, France	World Series	Hard	(Switzerland) Jakob Hlasek	6–4, 6–4

== ATP Challenger and ITF Futures finals ==
=== Singles: 4 (2–2) ===
Legend ATP Challenger (2–1) ITF Futures (0–1)	Finals by surface Hard (2–1) Clay (0–1) Grass (0–0) Carpet (0–0)

Result	W–L	Date	Tournament	Tier	Surface	Opponent	Score
Win	1-0	Apr 1989	Guadeloupe, France	Challenger	Hard	(France) Guillaume Raoux	6–7, 6–4, 6–7
Loss	1-1	Feb 1991	Benin City, Nigeria	Challenger	Hard	(Italy) Ugo Colombini	4–6, 6–3, 4–6
Win	2-1	Jul 1991	Campos do Jordão, Brazil	Challenger	Hard	(Brazil) Mauro Menezes	6–1, 6–3
Loss	2-2	May 1998	Italy F7, Parma	Futures	Clay	(Italy) Massimo Valeri	4–6, 3–6

=== Doubles: 4 (2–2) ===
Legend ATP Challenger (2–0) ITF Futures (0–2)	Finals by surface Hard (2–1) Clay (0–1) Grass (0–0) Carpet (0–0)

Result	W–L	Date	Tournament	Tier	Surface	Partner	Opponents	Score
Win	1–0	Jul 1991	Campos do Jordão, Brazil	Challenger	Hard	(France) Jean-Philippe Fleurian	(Brazil) Nelson Aerts (Brazil) Danilo Marcelino	6–3, 6–3
Win	2–0	Nov 1995	Réunion, Reunion Island	Challenger	Hard	(France) Fabrice Santoro	(United Kingdom) Tim Henman (United Kingdom) Andrew Richardson	1–6, 6–3, 6–1
Loss	2–1	May 1998	Italy F7, Parma	Futures	Clay	(France) Alexandre Simoni	(Italy) Giorgio Galimberti (Italy) Massimo Valeri	5–7, 6–3, 5–7
Loss	2–2	Sep 1998	France F5, Bagneres de Bigorre	Futures	Hard	(Switzerland) Lorenzo Manta	(France) Jean-Rene Lisnard (France) Michael Llodra	6–3, 3–6, 6–7

== Performance timeline ==
Key
W	F	SF	QF	#R	RR	Q#	DNQ	A	NH

(W) winner; (F) finalist; (SF) semifinalist; (QF) quarterfinalist; (#R) rounds 4, 3, 2, 1; (RR) round-robin stage; (Q#) qualification round; (DNQ) did not qualify; (A) absent; (NH) not held; (SR) strike rate (events won / competed); (W–L) win–loss record.

=== Singles ===
Tournament	1988	1989	1990	1991	1992	1993	1994	1995	1996	1997	1998	SR	W–L	Win %
Grand Slam tournaments
Australian Open	A	A	A	A	A	A	A	A	A	A	A	0 / 0	0–0	–
French Open	1R	A	A	A	A	A	Q1	A	Q2	A	A	0 / 1	0–1	0%
Wimbledon	1R	A	A	A	Q2	A	Q1	A	A	A	A	0 / 1	0–1	0%
US Open	1R	1R	A	A	A	A	A	A	Q1	A	Q1	0 / 2	0–2	0%
Win–loss	0–3	0–1	0–0	0–0	0–0	0–0	0–0	0–0	0–0	0–0	0–0	0 / 4	0–4	0%
ATP Masters Series
Miami	A	1R	A	A	A	A	Q2	A	A	A	A	0 / 1	0–1	0%
Hamburg	1R	A	A	A	A	A	A	A	A	A	A	0 / 1	0–1	0%
Canada	2R	1R	A	A	A	A	A	A	A	A	A	0 / 2	1–2	33%
Paris	A	A	A	A	Q1	A	A	A	A	A	A	0 / 0	0–0	–
Win–loss	1–2	0–2	0–0	0–0	0–0	0–0	0–0	0–0	0–0	0–0	0–0	0 / 4	1–4	20%
