= Cédric Pioline =

French tennis player

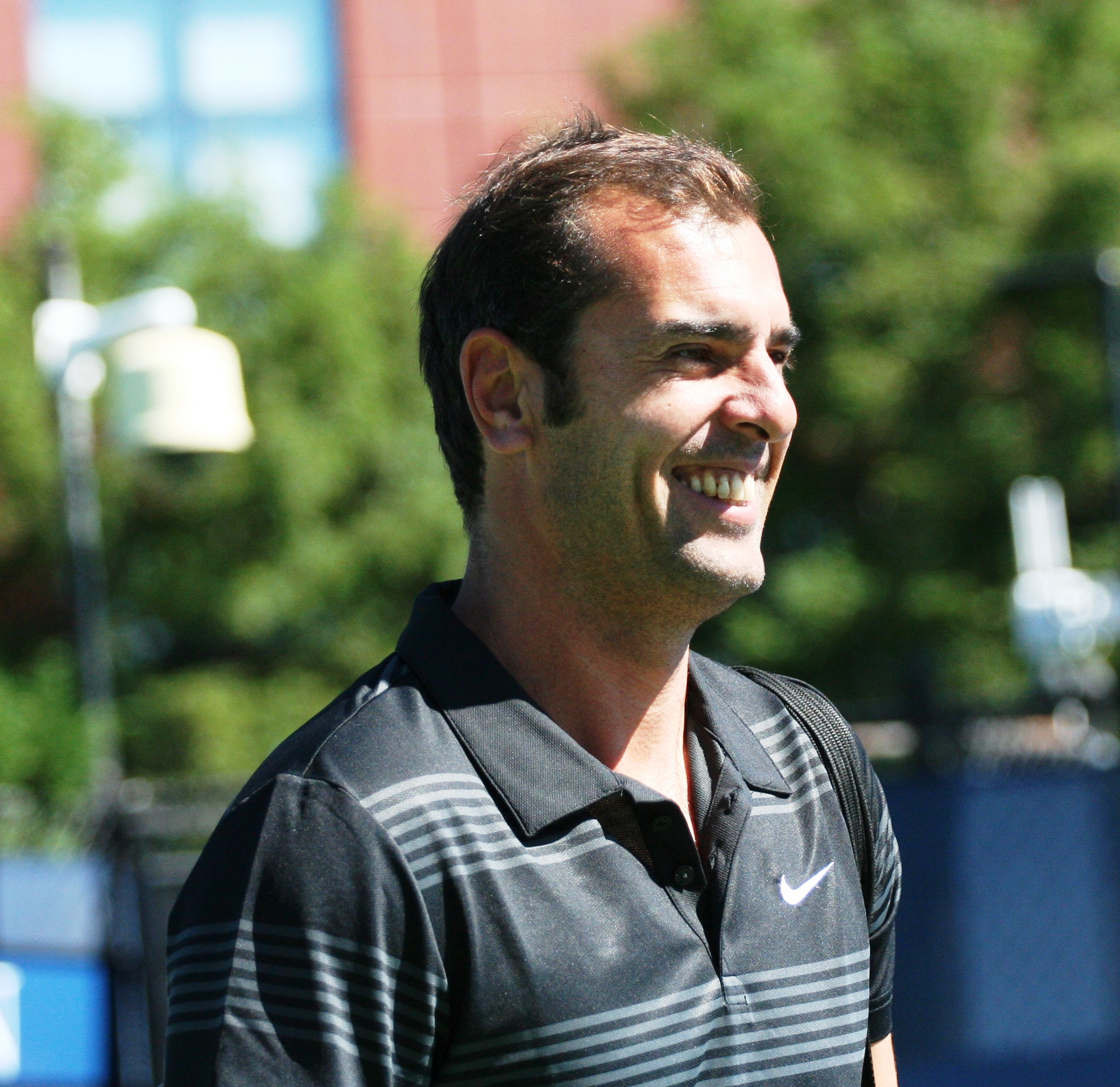
- Pioline in September 2010
- Country (sports): France
- Residence: Geneva, Switzerland
- Born: 15 June 1969 (age 57) Neuilly-sur-Seine, France
- Height: 1.88 m (6 ft 2 in)
- Turned pro: 1989
- Retired: 2002
- Plays: Right-handed (one-handed backhand)
- Prize money: $6,921,029

Singles
- Career record: 389–318 (55%)
- Career titles: 5
- Highest ranking: No. 5 (8 May 2000)

Grand Slam singles results
- Australian Open: 4R (1998)
- French Open: SF (1998)
- Wimbledon: F (1997)
- US Open: F (1993)

Other tournaments
- Grand Slam Cup: QF (1997)

Doubles
- Career record: 41–50 (45.1%)
- Career titles: 1
- Highest ranking: No. 93 (13 January 2003)

Grand Slam doubles results
- Australian Open: 1R (1990)
- French Open: QF (1989)

Mixed doubles
- Career record: 0–1
- Career titles: 0

Grand Slam mixed doubles results
- French Open: 1R (1989)

Team competitions
- Davis Cup: W (1996, 2001)
- Hopman Cup: F (1998)

Cédric Pioline (French: [sedʁik pjɔlin]; born 15 June 1969) is a French former professional tennis player. He was ranked world No. 5 in men's singles by the Association of Tennis Professionals (ATP), achieved in 2000. Pioline was the runner-up at the 1993 US Open and the 1997 Wimbledon Championships. He won five ATP Tour–level singles titles during his career, including a Masters event at the 2000 Monte Carlo Masters. Pioline also competed for France in the Davis Cup, winning the cup in 1996 and 2001.

After retiring from tennis, Pioline became a tennis administrator. As of October 2008, he has been the tournament director of the Paris Masters, and plays on the ATP Champions Tour.

== Personal life ==
Pioline grew up in a sporting family. His Romanian mother, Adriana, born in Câmpina, was a volleyball player; she was part of the Romanian national team that reached the finals of the 1956 FIVB World Championship, but were defeated by the Soviet Union. His father, Maurice, also a professional volleyball player, met his mother while at a volleyball match in Paris. He has an older brother named Denis.

He is married to Mireille Bercot; the couple have a son, Andrea (born 14 March 1993).

== Major finals ==
=== Grand Slam ===
==== Singles: 2 (0–2) ====
Result	Date	Championship	Surface	Opponent	Score
Loss	1993	US Open	Hard	(United States) Pete Sampras	4–6, 4–6, 3–6
Loss	1997	Wimbledon	Grass	(United States) Pete Sampras	4–6, 2–6, 4–6

=== Masters Series ===
==== Singles: 3 (1–2) ====
Result	Date	Tournament	Surface	Opponent	Score
Loss	1993	Monte Carlo	Clay	(Spain) Sergi Bruguera	6–7^{(2–7)}, 0–6
Loss	1998	Monte Carlo	Clay	(Spain) Carlos Moyà	3–6, 0–6, 5–7
Win	2000	Monte Carlo	Clay	(Slovakia) Dominik Hrbatý	6–4, 7–6^{(7–3)}, 7–6^{(8–6)}

== ATP career finals ==
=== Singles: 17 (5 titles, 12 runners-up) ===
Legend Grand Slam (0–2) Tennis Masters Cup (0–0) ATP Masters Series (1–2) ATP Championship Series (1–1) ATP International Series (3–7)	Finals by surface Hard (1–4) Grass (1–1) Clay (2–2) Carpet (1–5)

Result	W/L	Date	Tournament	Surface	Opponent	Score
Loss	0–1	Oct 1992	Lyon, France	Carpet (i)	(United States) Pete Sampras	4–6, 2–6
Loss	0–2	Apr 1993	Monte Carlo, Monaco	Clay	(Spain) Sergi Bruguera	6–7^{(2–7)}, 0–6
Loss	0–3	Sep 1993	US Open, New York City, U.S.	Hard	(United States) Pete Sampras	4–6, 4–6, 3–6
Loss	0–4	Oct 1993	Toulouse, France	Hard (i)	(France) Arnaud Boetsch	6–7^{(5–7)}, 6–3, 3–6
Loss	0–5	Oct 1993	Bolzano, Italy	Carpet (i)	(United States) Jonathan Stark	3–6, 2–6
Loss	0–6	Oct 1993	Lyon, France	Carpet (i)	(United States) Pete Sampras	6–7^{(5–7)}, 6–1, 5–7
Loss	0–7	Aug 1994	Long Island, U.S.	Hard	(Russia) Yevgeny Kafelnikov	7–5, 1–6, 2–6
Loss	0–8	Feb 1996	Zagreb, Croatia	Carpet (i)	(Croatia) Goran Ivanišević	6–3, 3–6, 2–6
Loss	0–9	Feb 1996	Marseille, France	Hard (i)	(France) Guy Forget	5–7, 4–6
Win	1–9	Mar 1996	Copenhagen, Denmark	Carpet (i)	(Denmark) Kenneth Carlsen	6–2, 7–6^{(9–7)}
Win	2–9	Apr 1997	Prague, Czech Republic	Clay	(Czech Republic) Bohdan Ulihrach	6–2, 5–7, 7–6^{(7–4)}
Loss	2–10	Jul 1997	Wimbledon, London, UK	Grass	(United States) Pete Sampras	4–6, 2–6, 4–6
Loss	2–11	Mar 1998	London, UK	Carpet (i)	(Russia) Yevgeny Kafelnikov	5–7, 4–6
Loss	2–12	Apr 1998	Monte Carlo, Monaco	Clay	(Spain) Carlos Moyà	3–6, 0–6, 5–7
Win	3–12	Jun 1999	Nottingham, UK	Grass	(Zimbabwe) Kevin Ullyett	6–3, 7–5
Win	4–12	Feb 2000	Rotterdam, Netherlands	Hard (i)	(United Kingdom) Tim Henman	6–7^{(3–7)}, 6–4, 7–6^{(7–4)}
Win	5–12	Apr 2000	Monte Carlo, Monaco	Clay	(Slovakia) Dominik Hrbatý	6–4, 7–6^{(7–3)}, 7–6^{(8–6)}

=== Doubles: 1 (1 win) ===
Result	W/L	Date	Tournament	Surface	Partner	Opponents	Score
Win	1–0	Jul 1993	Gstaad, Switzerland	Clay	(Switzerland) Marc Rosset	(Netherlands) Hendrik Jan Davids (South Africa) Piet Norval	6–3, 3–6, 7–6

== Singles performance timeline ==
Key
W	F	SF	QF	#R	RR	Q#	P#	DNQ	A	Z#	PO	G	S	B	NMS	NTI	P	NH

(W) winner; (F) finalist; (SF) semifinalist; (QF) quarterfinalist; (#R) rounds 4, 3, 2, 1; (RR) round-robin stage; (Q#) qualification round; (P#) preliminary round; (DNQ) did not qualify; (A) absent; (Z#) Davis/Fed Cup Zonal Group (with number indication) or (PO) play-off; (G) gold, (S) silver or (B) bronze Olympic/Paralympic medal; (NMS) not a Masters tournament; (NTI) not a Tier I tournament; (P) postponed; (NH) not held; (SR) strike rate (events won / competed); (W–L) win–loss record.

Tournament	1987	1988	1989	1990	1991	1992	1993	1994	1995	1996	1997	1998	1999	2000	2001	2002	Career SR	Career win–loss
Grand Slam tournaments
Australian Open	A	A	A	1R	1R	2R	2R	1R	1R	A	A	4R	1R	1R	3R	A	0 / 10	7–10
French Open	A	A	1R	1R	2R	4R	2R	2R	2R	QF	3R	SF	1R	4R	2R	1R	0 / 14	22–14
Wimbledon	A	A	A	A	2R	2R	QF	1R	QF	4R	F	1R	QF	2R	2R	1R	0 / 12	24–12
US Open	A	A	A	A	1R	3R	F	3R	2R	3R	4R	1R	SF	3R	1R	Q1	0 / 11	23–11
Grand Slam SR	0 / 0	0 / 0	0 / 1	0 / 2	0 / 4	0 / 4	0 / 4	0 / 4	0 / 4	0 / 3	0 / 3	0 / 4	0 / 4	0 / 4	0 / 4	0 / 2	0 / 47	N/A
Annual win–loss	0–0	0–0	0–1	0–2	2–4	7–4	12–4	3–4	6–4	9–3	10–3	8–4	9–4	6–4	4–4	0–2	N/A	76–47
Year-end championships
Grand Slam Cup	Not Held			A	A	A	1R	A	1R	1R	QF	1R	A	Not Held			0 / 5	1–5
Grand Prix				ATP Masters Series														
Indian Wells	A	A	A	A	A	2R	1R	1R	1R	A	QF	2R	2R	1R	2R	A	0 / 9	7–9
Miami	A	A	A	A	A	4R	A	4R	A	3R	2R	3R	A	3R	2R	1R	0 / 8	8–8
Monte Carlo	A	A	A	2R	A	1R	F	1R	2R	SF	2R	F	1R	W	3R	1R	1 / 12	25–11
Rome	A	A	1R	A	2R	1R	2R	3R	1R	2R	2R	2R	1R	2R	1R	Q2	0 / 12	8–12
Hamburg	A	A	A	A	A	1R	A	A	A	2R	1R	A	1R	QF	2R	Q2	0 / 6	5–6
Canada	A	A	A	A	A	A	A	A	A	3R	A	A	A	A	A	A	0 / 1	2–1
Cincinnati	A	A	A	A	A	3R	2R	3R	1R	2R	1R	2R	3R	A	A	Q1	0 / 8	9–8
Stockholm	A	A	A	A	A	A	A	1R	Not Masters Series								0 / 1	0–1
Stuttgart	Not Held			Not Masters Series					A	A	3R	A	2R	A	A	NH	0 / 2	2–2
Paris	A	A	A	A	1R	2R	2R	3R	2R	2R	2R	1R	QF	2R	1R	A	0 / 11	8–11
Masters Series SR	N/A			0 / 1	0 / 2	0 / 7	0 / 5	0 / 7	0 / 5	0 / 7	0 / 8	0 / 6	0 / 7	1 / 6	0 / 6	0 / 2	1 / 69	N/A
Annual win–loss	N/A		0–3	1–1	1–2	7–7	7–5	8–7	2–5	11–7	8–8	9–6	5–7	11–5	4–6	0–2	N/A	74–68
Year-end ranking	954	461	202	118	51	33	10	51	54	21	20	18	14	16	84	119	N/A	

== Best Grand Slam results details ==
	Australian Open	
1998 Australian Open
Round	Opponent	Score
1R	(Brazil) Fernando Meligeni	6–4, 1–6, 6–5 ret.
2R	(Spain) Jordi Burillo	6–3, 7–5, 3–6, 6–3
3R	(Spain) Àlex Corretja (11)	6–2, 6–1, 6–4
4R	(Czech Republic) Petr Korda (6)	4–6, 4–6, 6–3, 3–6

	French Open	
1998 French Open
Round	Opponent	Score
1R	(Uruguay) Marcelo Filippini	6–1, 3–6, 7–5, 6–7^{(4–7)}, 6–4
2R	(France) Julien Boutter (Q)	7–5, 6–3, 3–6, 6–4
3R	(Netherlands) Richard Krajicek (10)	6–3, 6–2, 7–5
4R	(Russia) Marat Safin (Q)	7–5, 4–6, 6–7^{(5–7)}, 6–4, 6–4
QF	(Morocco) Hicham Arazi	3–6, 6–2, 7–6^{(8–6)}, 4–6, 6–3
SF	(Spain) Àlex Corretja (14)	3–6, 4–6, 2–6

	Wimbledon Championships	
1997 Wimbledon
Round	Opponent	Score
1R	(Argentina) Marcelo Charpentier	5–7, 6–3, 7–5, 6–2
2R	(Argentina) Javier Frana	Walkover
3R	(South Africa) Wayne Ferreira (15)	6–4, 6–3, 6–3
4R	(New Zealand) Brett Steven	3–6, 6–3, 6–4, 7–5
QF	(United Kingdom) Greg Rusedski	6–4, 4–6, 6–4, 6–3
SF	(Germany) Michael Stich	6–7^{(2–7)}, 6–2, 6–1, 5–7, 6–4
F	(United States) Pete Sampras (1)	4–6, 2–6, 4–6

	US Open	
1993 US Open (15th Seed)
Round	Opponent	Score
1R	(Germany) David Prinosil	6–7^{(6–8)}, 7–5, 6–4, 3–6, 6–1
2R	(United States) Jared Palmer	6–4, 3–6, 5–7, 7–5, 6–1
3R	(Sweden) Mats Wilander (WC)	6–4, 6–4, 6–4
4R	(United States) Jim Courier (1)	7–5, 6–7^{(4–7)}, 6–4, 6–4
QF	(Ukraine) Andrei Medvedev (8)	6–3, 6–1, 3–6, 6–2
SF	(Australia) Wally Masur	6–1, 6–7^{(3–7)}, 7–6^{(7–2)}, 6–1
F	(United States) Pete Sampras (2)	4–6, 4–6, 3–6

== Top 10 wins ==
Season	1989	1990	1991	1992	1993	1994	1995	1996	1997	1998	1999	2000	2001	2002	Total
Wins	0	0	0	2	7	1	0	2	2	3	7	1	0	1	26

#	Player	Rank	Event	Surface	Rd	Score	PR
1992
1.	(Spain) Carlos Costa	10	Hilversum, Netherlands	Clay	1R	6–3, 6–3	66
2.	(United States) Ivan Lendl	9	Bordeaux, France	Clay	QF	7–5, 6–4	57
1993
3.	(Czech Republic) Petr Korda	5	Monte Carlo, Monaco	Clay	3R	6–3, 6–0	29
4.	(Sweden) Stefan Edberg	3	Monte Carlo, Monaco	Clay	SF	6–4, 6–4	29
5.	(Ukraine) Andriy Medvedev	9	Wimbledon, London, United Kingdom	Grass	2R	6–7^{(7–9)}, 7–6^{(8–6)}, 6–3, 6–4	23
6.	(Germany) Michael Stich	6	Long Island, United States	Hard	2R	6–7^{(5–7)}, 6–4, 7–6^{(8–6)}	15
7.	(United States) Jim Courier	1	US Open, New York, United States	Hard	4R	7–5, 6–7^{(4–7)}, 6–4, 6–4	14
8.	(Ukraine) Andriy Medvedev	8	US Open, New York, United States	Hard	QF	6–3, 6–1, 3–6, 6–2	14
9.	(Croatia) Goran Ivanišević	9	Antwerp, Belgium	Carpet (i)	QF	7–6^{(9–7)}, 6–0	11
1994
10.	(United States) Todd Martin	9	Long Island, United States	Hard	QF	7–6^{(7–3)}, 6–4	18
1996
11.	(Russia) Yevgeny Kafelnikov	8	Monte Carlo, Monaco	Clay	2R	6–4, 6–3	29
12.	(Chile) Marcelo Ríos	10	French Open, Paris, France	Clay	4R	6–4, 6–1, 6–2	19
1997
13.	(Austria) Thomas Muster	2	Barcelona, Spain	Clay	3R	7–6^{(7–4)}, 6–4	34
14.	(United States) Michael Chang	2	Stuttgart, Germany	Carpet (i)	2R	7–5, 1–6, 6–4	25
1998
15.	(Czech Republic) Petr Korda	2	London, United Kingdom	Carpet (i)	2R	6–3, 6–3	18
16.	(Brazil) Gustavo Kuerten	9	Monte Carlo, Monaco	Clay	3R	7–6^{(8–6)}, 6–1	16
17.	(Netherlands) Richard Krajicek	10	French Open, Paris, France	Clay	3R	6–3, 6–2, 7–5	17
1999
18.	(Netherlands) Richard Krajicek	10	Rotterdam, Netherlands	Carpet (i)	2R	7–6^{(7–5)}, 7–6^{(11–9)}	18
19.	(Netherlands) Richard Krajicek	4	Davis Cup, Nîmes, France	Clay (i)	RR	6–3, 3–6, 7–5, 7–6^{(7–5)}	21
20.	(Russia) Yevgeny Kafelnikov	3	Wimbledon, London, United Kingdom	Grass	3R	3–6, 6–4, 1–0, ret.	39
21.	(Brazil) Gustavo Kuerten	5	Davis Cup, Pau, France	Carpet (i)	RR	6–3, 6–4, 6–4	25
22.	(Spain) Carlos Moyá	10	Cincinnati, United States	Hard	1R	6–4, 6–1	26
23.	(Australia) Pat Rafter	4	US Open, New York, United States	Hard	1R	4–6, 4–6, 6–3, 7–5, 1–0, ret.	26
24.	(Brazil) Gustavo Kuerten	6	US Open, New York, United States	Hard	QF	4–6, 7–6^{(8–6)}, 7–6^{(16–14)}, 7–6^{(10–8)}	26
2000
25.	(Germany) Nicolas Kiefer	4	Rotterdam, Netherlands	Hard (i)	QF	2–6, 6–3, 7–5	15
2002
26.	(Spain) Juan Carlos Ferrero	3	Marseille, France	Hard (i)	QF	6–7^{(3–7)}, 6–4, 7–5	99

== TV show ==
In 2011 Pioline was one of the contestants during the second season of the TV show Danse avec les stars.

Danse avec les stars

- In 2011 he participated in season 2 of Danse avec les stars (the French version of Strictly Come Dancing) with his partner Katrina Patchett but sadly got eliminated in the first week.

This table shows the route of Cédric Pioline and Katrina Patchett in Danse Avec Les Stars. The face to face wasn't rated.

Week	Dancing style	Music	Judge points			Total	Ranking	Result
Week	Dancing style	Music	Alessandra Martines	Jean-Marc Généreux	Chris Marques	Total	Ranking	Result
1	Rumba Cha-Cha-Cha (face to face)	"Rolling in the Deep" – Adele On the floor – Jennifer Lopez	6 N/A	4 N/A	3 N/A	13/30	8/9	Eliminated (35%)
