= 2014 Open Sud de France =

- Date: 3–9 February 2014
- Edition: 27th
- Draw: 28S / 16D
- Prize money: €426,605
- Surface: Hard (indoor)
- Location: Montpellier, France

Champions

Singles
- (France) Gaël Monfils

Doubles
- (Russia) Nikolay Davydenko / (Uzbekistan) Denis Istomin
← 2013 ·	Open Sud de France	· 2015 →

The 2014 Open Sud de France was a men's tennis tournament played on indoor hard courts. It was the 27th edition of the Open Sud de France, and part of the ATP World Tour 250 Series of the 2014 ATP World Tour. It took place at the Arena Montpellier in Montpellier, France, from 3 February until 9 February 2014. Fifth-seeded Gaël Monfils won the singles title.

== Finals ==
=== Singles ===
(Czech Republic) Tomáš Berdych defeated (France) Gaël Monfils, 6–2, 4–6, 6–3

- It was Berdych's 1st title of the year and 7th of his career.

=== Doubles ===
(France) Nicolas Mahut / (France) Édouard Roger-Vasselin defeated (Australia) Paul Hanley / (United Kingdom) Jamie Murray, 6–4, 7–6^{(7–4)}

== Points and prize money ==
=== Point distribution ===
Event	W	F	SF	QF	Round of 16	Round of 32	Q	Q3	Q2	Q1
Singles	250	150	90	45	20	0	12	6	0	0
Doubles	250	150	90	45	0	—	—	—	—	—

=== Prize money ===
Event	W	F	SF	QF	Round of 16	Round of 32	Q3	Q2	Q1
Singles	€77,315	€40,720	€22,060	€12,565	€7,405	€4,385	€	€	—
Doubles *	€23,500	€12,350	€6,690	€3,830	€2,240	—	—	—	—
Doubles prize money per team

== Singles main-draw entrants ==
=== Seeds ===
Country	Player	Rank^{1}	Seed
FRA	Richard Gasquet	9	1
FRA	Gilles Simon	20	2
POL	Jerzy Janowicz	21	3
RUS	Dmitry Tursunov	28	4
FRA	Gaël Monfils	30	5
FIN	Jarkko Nieminen	36	6
FRA	Édouard Roger-Vasselin	38	7
FRA	Julien Benneteau	39	8

- Rankings are as of January 27, 2014.

=== Other entrants ===
The following players received wildcards into the singles main draw:

- (France) Pierre-Hugues Herbert
- (France) Paul-Henri Mathieu
- (France) Gilles Simon

The following players received entry from the qualifying draw:

- (Spain) Andrés Artuñedo Martínavarr
- (France) Marc Gicquel
- (Turkey) Marsel İlhan
- (France) Albano Olivetti

The following player received entry as a lucky loser:

- (France) Vincent Millot

=== Withdrawals ===
Before the tournament

- (Spain) Roberto Bautista Agut (right wrist injury)
- (France) Benoît Paire (left patellar tendon injury)
- (Switzerland) Stanislas Wawrinka (leg injury)

=== Retirements ===
- (France) Nicolas Mahut (flu)
- (Kazakhstan) Oleksandr Nedovyesov (right shoulder injury)

== Doubles main-draw entrants ==
=== Seeds ===
Country	Player	Country	Player	Rank^{1}	Seed
GER	Andre Begemann	GER	Martin Emmrich	89	1
AUS	Rameez Junaid	PAK	Aisam-ul-Haq Qureshi	105	2
AUS	Paul Hanley	GBR	Jonathan Marray	124	3
GBR	Ken Skupski	GBR	Neal Skupski	143	4

- Rankings are as of January 27, 2014.

=== Other entrants ===
The following pairs received wildcards into the doubles main draw:

- (France) Dorian Descloix / (France) Gaël Monfils
- (France) Guillaume Rufin / (France) Gilles Simon

=== Withdrawals ===
Before the tournament

- (France) Gaël Monfils (back injury)
