= Günter Bresnik =

Austrian tennis coach

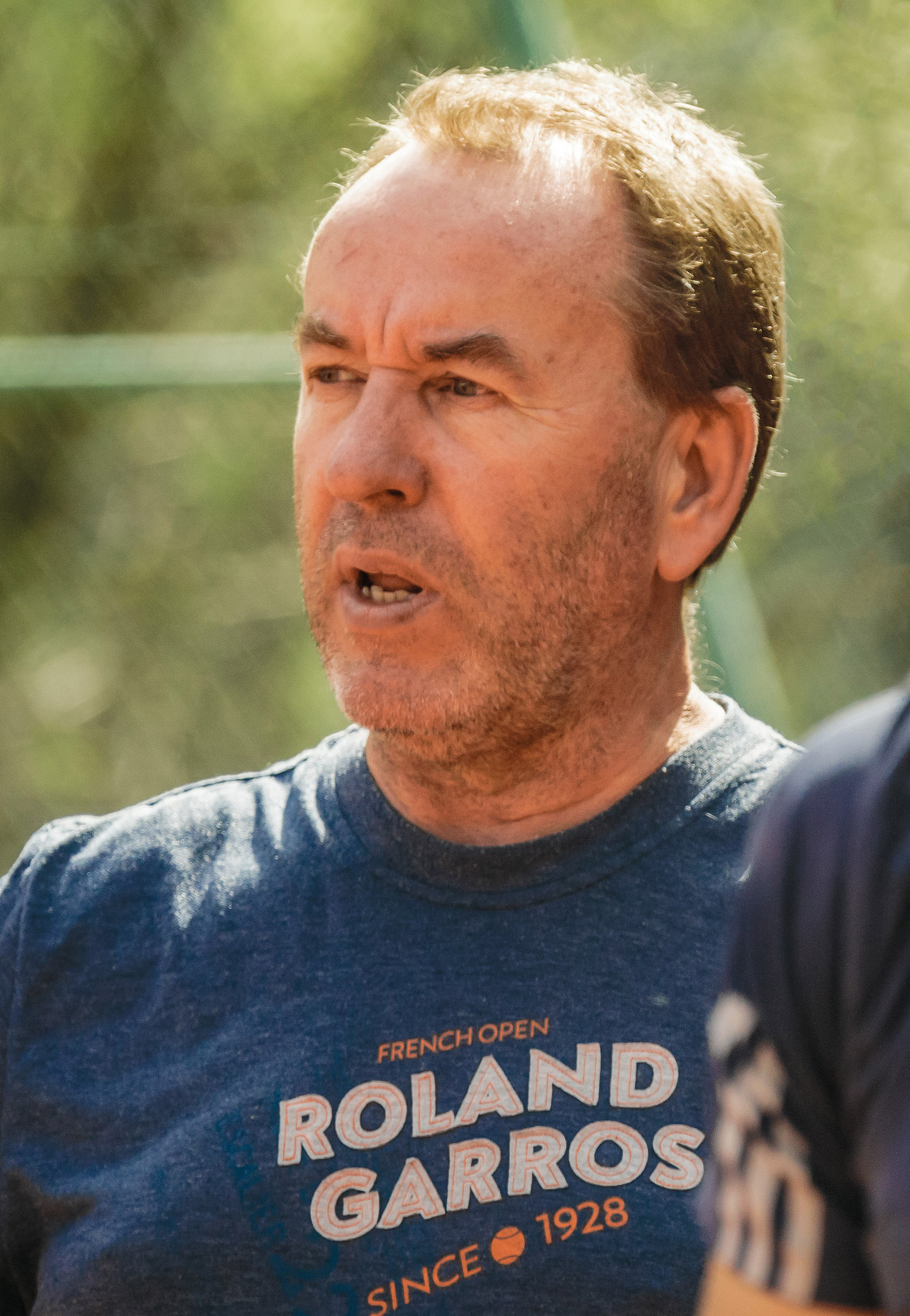

Sports Director of the Austrian Tennis Association
- In office 4 March 1998 – 8 February 2004

Personal details
- Born: 21 April 1961 (age 65) Vienna, Austria
- Education: University of Vienna
- Tennis career

Coaching career (1987–)
- Horst Skoff (1987–1990); Boris Becker (1992–1993); Jakob Hlasek; Henri Leconte; Stefan Koubek; Patrick McEnroe; Amos Mansdorf; Dominic Thiem (2002–2019); Ernests Gulbis (2012–2016; 2018–2021); Gaël Monfils (2021–2023); Dennis Novak (2023–2025)

Coaching achievements
- List of notable tournaments (with champion): 1x ATP Masters 1000 (Thiem); 1x ATP Finals (Becker)

Günter Bresnik (born 21 April 1961) is an Austrian tennis coach.

== Early years ==
Born in Vienna to two doctors, Bresnik grew up in Perchtoldsdorf. He began playing tennis at 16-years-old before he studied medicine for four years at the University of Vienna. As Bresnik recalls, his career as a coach “happened by accident, while studying medicine.” He had begun doing coaching sessions while in school, and made contacts with top players. One of them was 19-year-old Horst Skoff. In 1987 Skoff asked Bresnik to join him as coach during a five-week South American trip. Bresnik had planned to take off only one semester. He coached Skoff for three years full-time, and, with encouragement from his father, never returned to medical school. He has found this a rewarding career: “When you train elite players, you go to great tournaments, hotels... You always get great food. If you complained about such a thing, I think you need a psychiatrist.”

== Coaching career ==
In his coaching career since the mid-1980s, although never a tour level player, Bresnik has coached 27 top 100 tennis pros, including Boris Becker from September 1992 to May 1993 (Becker described Bresnik as a disciplined, hard-working, and humble man and coach), Henri Leconte, Horst Skoff, Patrick McEnroe, Patrick Baur, Ernests Gulbis (calling Bresnik the "best technical coach out there") and Stefan Koubek. Dominic Thiem, winner of the 2020 U.S. Open, had been coached by Gunter Bresnik from age 8 to 2019, but he has known Bresnik since he was age 3–after Thiem’s father, Wolfgang, came to work as a coach at Bresnik’s international tennis academy in Vienna in 1997. Bresnik has also been working with Alex Shevchenko since he was 9 years old.

From 1992 to 1993 and from 1998 to 2004, Bresnik was the captain of the Austrian Davis Cup team. In 1998–1999, he was the director of the Austrian Tennis Association. On 21 October 2016, Bresnik's first book, titled The Dominic Thiem Method, was published. In it, he portrays both his strategy for Dominic Thiem's career path from boy to the world-class athlete and his own career as a tennis coach and administrator. Bresnik training techniques with Thiem have been described as authoritarian and demanding. He has been criticized for having long-term protege Thiem ("his creature") play in too many tournaments and ending his seasons "on his kneecaps." In 2016, Thiem played in 27 tournaments; in February 2017, he played in four tournaments: Sofia, Rio de Janeiro, Rotterdam and Acapulco; Bresnik admitted that "the schedule was really ridiculous, it's my fault." He has been criticized for keeping Thiem out of Davis Cup competition, stating "He [Thiem] has no obligation to play Davis Cup. I cannot hear this patriotic crap." His typical training day was 12 hours long, 8 am to 8 pm. Some of Bresnik's training techniques are unusual for tennis, such as putting weights around Thiem's waist, taking him into the woods and having him run back home; "I prefer to train outdoors...In Austria, to climb up the mountains, to go hiking, gives a mental boost to a player to get to the top." Bresnik defended Thiem's heavy workload and vigorous fitness training, noting "you are not going to succeed in this sport if you are soft physically or mentally." He was originally supported by Thiem who stated that "Günter is the perfect coach for me."

In April 2019, Thiem and Bresnik split. Bresnik did not speculate on the reasons for the breakup at the time. A year later, the split became publicly acrimonious. Bresnik claimed that Thiem and his father "owed everything" to him; without him, Thiem would only be a futures player, and his father would be a club trainer in Seebenstein. He said that Thiem and his father lacked loyalty, honesty and values. Thiem then accused Bresnik of megalomania. He reiterated that he would not discuss the reasons for the breakup, "at least for now." His father said that Thiem wished to make decisions for himself.

In 2020-2021, Bresnik was working with Grand Slam semi-finalists Jerzy Janowicz and Ernests Gulbis. In 2021, starting in January, he worked with Gael Monfils until May 2023.

Bresnik has been described as "the Giacometti of tennis. He sees a figure in a block of marble, which is only a block of marble for others." He is known for having an eye for technical intricacies and how to correct any weakness. Ion Tiriac called him "the only one to understand tennis.", as well as "the best coach in the world." Bresnik describes himself as a coach who is "very obsessed with the quality of the technique and the strokes." He does not consider himself a motivator for his students, claiming that "the drive must be with the player himself. I cannot do anything with the talk about the coach as a motivator."

== Personal life ==
Bresnick is married with four daughters. He lives in Innermanzing, Lower Austria and runs a tennis academy in the Südstadt area.
