= 2014 Open Sud de France – Singles =

Singles
- 2014 Open Sud de France

Final
- Champion: (France) Gaël Monfils
- Runner-up: (France) Richard Gasquet
- Score: 6–4, 6–4

Details
- Draw: 28
- Seeds: 8

Events
Singles	Doubles
- Open Sud de France

Richard Gasquet was the defending champion, but lost in the final to Gaël Monfils, 4–6, 4–6.

== Seeds ==
The top four seeds receive a bye into the second round.

1. (France) Richard Gasquet (final)
2. (France) Gilles Simon (second round)
3. (Poland) Jerzy Janowicz (semifinals)
4. (Russia) Dmitry Tursunov (second round)
5. (France) Gaël Monfils (champion)
6. (Finland) Jarkko Nieminen (semifinals)
7. (France) Édouard Roger-Vasselin (quarterfinals)
8. (France) Julien Benneteau (first round)

== Draw ==
Key

- Q = Qualifier
- WC = Wild card
- LL = Lucky loser
- Alt = Alternate
- ITF = ITF entry
- PR = Protected ranking
- SR = Special ranking
- SE = Special exempt
- JE = Junior exempt
- JR = Junior Accelerator Programme entrant
- CO = College Accelerator Programme entrant
- NG = Next Gen Accelerator Program entrant
- w/o = Walkover
- r = Retired
- d = Defaulted

=== Finals ===
Semifinals
1	(France) Richard Gasquet	7^{8}	7^{7}
3	(Poland) Jerzy Janowicz	6^{6}	6^{4}
5	(France) Gaël Monfils	6	3	6
6	(Finland) Jarkko Nieminen	2	6	1

Final
1	(France) Richard Gasquet	4	4
5	(France) Gaël Monfils	6	6

=== Top half ===
First round
WC	(France) P-H Mathieu	6	3
(France) N Mahut	1	0^{r}
(France) K de Schepper	6	6^{2}	4
Q	(France) A Olivetti	4	7^{7}	6
(Russia) N Davydenko	7^{8}	7
8	(France) J Benneteau	6^{6}	5
LL	(France) V Millot	4	4
(France) A Mannarino	6	6
(Russia) T Gabashvili	6	1	6^{1}
(Germany) D Brown	4	6	7^{7}
(Poland) M Przysiężny	6^{3}	3
7	(France) É Roger-Vasselin	7^{7}	6

Second round
1	(France) R Gasquet	6	6
WC	(France) P-H Mathieu	1	3
Q	(France) A Olivetti	7^{7}	6^{5}	7
(Russia) N Davydenko	6^{5}	7^{7}	5
3	(Poland) J Janowicz	7^{7}	6
(France) A Mannarino	6^{2}	3
(Germany) D Brown	3	4
7	(France) É Roger-Vasselin	6	6

Quarterfinals
1	(France) R Gasquet	6	6
Q	(France) A Olivetti	4	2
3	(Poland) J Janowicz	6	6
7	(France) É Roger-Vasselin	2	4

Semifinals
1	(France) R Gasquet	7^{8}	7^{7}
3	(Poland) J Janowicz	6^{6}	6^{4}

=== Bottom half ===
First round
5	(France) G Monfils	6	4	6
(Poland) Ł Kubot	4	6	3
(Germany) T Kamke	6	1	4
(Portugal) J Sousa	3	6	6
(Uzbekistan) D Istomin	6	7
Q	(Turkey) M İlhan	4	5
6	(Finland) J Nieminen	4	6	4
(Kazakhstan) A Nedovyesov	6	2	4^{r}
WC	(France) P-H Herbert	6	6
Q	(Spain) A Artuñedo	4	3
(France) M Llodra	4	6^{4}
Q	(France) M Gicquel	6	7^{7}

Second round
5	(France) G Monfils	6	6
(Portugal) J Sousa	3	2
(Uzbekistan) D Istomin	7	6
4	(Russia) D Tursunov	5	4
6	(Finland) J Nieminen	7^{7}	7^{7}
WC	(France) P-H Herbert	6^{5}	6^{5}
Q	(France) M Gicquel	7^{7}	6
2/WC	(France) G Simon	6^{4}	3

Quarterfinals
5	(France) G Monfils	6	6
(Uzbekistan) D Istomin	4	4
6	(Finland) J Nieminen	6	3	7^{7}
Q	(France) M Gicquel	3	6	6^{5}

Semifinals
5	(France) G Monfils	6	3	6
6	(Finland) J Nieminen	2	6	1

== Qualifying ==
=== Seeds ===
1. (France) Marc Gicquel (qualified)
2. (Hungary) Márton Fucsovics (second round)
3. (Turkey) Marsel İlhan (qualified)
4. (Belgium) Niels Desein (second round)
5. (France) Vincent Millot (qualifying competition, Lucky loser)
6. (France) Maxime Teixeira (qualifying competition)
7. (United States) Austin Krajicek (qualifying competition)
8. (France) Grégoire Burquier (second round)

=== Qualifiers ===
1. (France) Marc Gicquel
2. (France) Albano Olivetti
3. (Turkey) Marsel İlhan
4. (Spain) Andrés Artuñedo Martínavarr

=== Qualifying draw ===
==== First qualifier ====
First round
1	(France) Marc Gicquel	6^{5}	6	6
(France) Rudy Coco	7^{7}	3	3
(France) Laurent Rochette	4	3
(France) Yannick Jankovits	6	6
(Italy) Erik Crepaldi	6	6
(Italy) Roberto Marcora	4	4
(France) Jean-Pascal Vernet	3	1
7	(United States) Austin Krajicek	6	6

Second round
1	(France) Marc Gicquel	6	6
(France) Yannick Jankovits	2	4
(Italy) Erik Crepaldi	4	4
7	(United States) Austin Krajicek	6	6

Qualifying competition
1	(France) Marc Gicquel	6	6
7	(United States) Austin Krajicek	3	2

==== Second qualifier ====
First round
2	(Hungary) Márton Fucsovics	6	2
(Georgia (country)) Nikoloz Basilashvili	1	0^{r}
(France) Antoine Benneteau	7^{7}	4	6^{4}
(France) Albano Olivetti	6^{3}	6	7^{7}
(Italy) Lorenzo Giustino	6	6
(France) Jules Marie	3	3
(Austria) Maximilian Neuchrist
8	(France) Grégoire Burquier	w/o

Second round
2	(Hungary) Márton Fucsovics	4	6^{1}
(France) Albano Olivetti	6	7^{7}
(Italy) Lorenzo Giustino	6	1	6
8	(France) Grégoire Burquier	4	6	3

Qualifying competition
(France) Albano Olivetti	6^{5}	6	6
(Italy) Lorenzo Giustino	7^{7}	4	4

==== Third qualifier ====
First round
3	(Turkey) Marsel İlhan	6	6
(France) Dorian Descloix	4	4
(Spain) Enrique López Pérez	6	7^{9}
(France) Calvin Hemery	4	6^{7}
(France) Laurent Lokoli	6	7^{7}
(France) Kevin Boumlil	3	6^{2}
(France) Hugo Nys	4	1
6	(France) Maxime Teixeira	6	6

Second round
3	(Turkey) Marsel İlhan	6^{3}	7^{7}	6
(Spain) Enrique López Pérez	7^{7}	6^{1}	3
(France) Laurent Lokoli	6	3	2
6	(France) Maxime Teixeira	3	6	6

Qualifying competition
3	(Turkey) Marsel İlhan	6	6
6	(France) Maxime Teixeira	3	4

==== Fourth qualifier ====
First round
4	(Belgium) Niels Desein	6	6
(France) Maxime Janvier	3	2
(Spain) Andrés Artuñedo Martínavarr	6	7^{7}
(Italy) Alessandro Bega	3	6^{4}
(France) Constant Lestienne	6	6
(France) Bastien Favier	3	2
(France) Fabrice Martin	4	6^{6}
5	(France) Vincent Millot	6	7^{8}

Second round
4	(Belgium) Niels Desein	4	6	6^{4}
(Spain) Andrés Artuñedo Martínavarr	6	3	7^{7}
(France) Constant Lestienne	2	3
5	(France) Vincent Millot	6	6

Qualifying competition
(Spain) Andrés Artuñedo Martínavarr	3	7^{7}	6
5	(France) Vincent Millot	6	6^{1}	3
