= 2015 Open Sud de France – Doubles =

Doubles
- 2015 Open Sud de France

Final
- Champions: (New Zealand) Marcus Daniell (New Zealand) Artem Sitak
- Runners-up: (United Kingdom) Dominic Inglot (Romania) Florin Mergea
- Score: 3–6, 6–4, [16–14]

Details
- Draw: 16
- Seeds: 4

Events
Singles	Doubles
← 2014 ·	Open Sud de France	· 2016 →

Nikolay Davydenko and Denis Istomin were the defending champions, but Davydenko retired from professional tennis in October 2014. Istomin played alongside Alexander Kudryavtsev, but they lost in the first round to Dominic Inglot and Florin Mergea.
Marcus Daniell and Artem Sitak won the title, defeating Inglot and Mergea in the final, 3–6, 6–4, [16–14].

== Seeds ==
1. (United Kingdom) Dominic Inglot / (Romania) Florin Mergea (final)
2. (Austria) Philipp Oswald / (Pakistan) Aisam-ul-Haq Qureshi (first round)
3. (Croatia) Mate Pavić / (Brazil) André Sá (first round)
4. (United Kingdom) Colin Fleming / (United Kingdom) Jonathan Marray (quarterfinals)

== Draw ==
=== Key ===
- Q = Qualifier
- WC = Wild card
- LL = Lucky loser
- Alt = Alternate
- SE = Special exempt
- PR = Protected ranking
- ITF = ITF entry
- JE = Junior exempt
- w/o = Walkover
- r = Retired
- d = Defaulted
- SR = Special ranking

=== Draw ===
First round
1	(United Kingdom) D Inglot (Romania) F Mergea	6	7
(Uzbekistan) D Istomin (Russia) A Kudryavtsev	3	5
(United Kingdom) K Skupski (United Kingdom) N Skupski	6	3	[8]
(Germany) D Brown (Germany) J-L Struff	3	6	[10]
3	(Croatia) M Pavić (Brazil) A Sá	7^{7}	3	[4]
(Australia) R Junaid (Canada) A Shamasdin	6^{3}	6	[10]
(China) M Gong (Chinese Taipei) H-y Peng	6	7^{7}
WC	(France) L Lokoli (Germany) A Zverev	4	6^{4}
(New Zealand) M Daniell (New Zealand) A Sitak	6	7^{9}
WC	(France) D Descloix (France) G Monfils	2	6^{7}
(Germany) F Moser (India) D Sharan	1	3
4	(United Kingdom) C Fleming (United Kingdom) J Marray	6	6
(France) L Pouille (France) G Simon	3	4
(Tunisia) M Jaziri (Spain) M López	6	6
(Czech Republic) F Čermák (Israel) J Erlich	7^{7}	6
2	(Austria) P Oswald (Pakistan) A-u-H Qureshi	6^{1}	4

Quarterfinals
1	(United Kingdom) D Inglot (Romania) F Mergea	6^{8}	7	[14]
(Germany) D Brown (Germany) J-L Struff	7^{10}	5	[12]
(Australia) R Junaid (Canada) A Shamasdin	6	6
(China) M Gong (Chinese Taipei) H-y Peng	1	1
(New Zealand) M Daniell (New Zealand) A Sitak	7^{8}	6^{5}	[11]
4	(United Kingdom) C Fleming (United Kingdom) J Marray	6^{6}	7^{7}	[9]
(Tunisia) M Jaziri (Spain) M López
(Czech Republic) F Čermák (Israel) J Erlich	w/o

Semifinals
1	(United Kingdom) D Inglot (Romania) F Mergea	6	7
(Australia) R Junaid (Canada) A Shamasdin	4	5
(New Zealand) M Daniell (New Zealand) A Sitak	7^{7}	6
(Czech Republic) F Čermák (Israel) J Erlich	6^{3}	3

Final
1	(United Kingdom) D Inglot (Romania) F Mergea	6	4	[14]
(New Zealand) M Daniell (New Zealand) A Sitak	3	6	[16]
