= 2013 Open Sud de France – Singles =

Singles
- 2013 Open Sud de France

Final
- Champion: (France) Richard Gasquet
- Runner-up: (France) Benoît Paire
- Score: 6–2, 6–3

Details
- Draw: 28
- Seeds: 8

Events
Singles	Doubles
- Open Sud de France

Tomáš Berdych was the defending champion but withdrew because of a wrist injury.
Richard Gasquet won the title, defeating Benoît Paire in an all-French final, 6–2, 6–3.

== Seeds ==
The top four seeds receive a bye into the second round.

1. (Czech Republic) Tomáš Berdych (withdrew because of a left wrist injury)
2. (Serbia) Janko Tipsarević (second round)
3. (France) Richard Gasquet (champion)
4. (France) Gilles Simon (quarterfinals)
5. (Russia) Nikolay Davydenko (second round)
6. (France) Julien Benneteau (quarterfinals)
7. (Serbia) Viktor Troicki (second round, retired)
8. (France) Benoît Paire (final)
9. (France) Paul-Henri Mathieu (first round)

== Draw ==
Key

- Q = Qualifier
- WC = Wild card
- LL = Lucky loser
- Alt = Alternate
- ITF = ITF entry
- PR = Protected ranking
- SR = Special ranking
- SE = Special exempt
- JE = Junior exempt
- JR = Junior Accelerator Programme entrant
- CO = College Accelerator Programme entrant
- NG = Next Gen Accelerator Program entrant
- w/o = Walkover
- r = Retired
- d = Defaulted

=== Finals ===
Semifinals
(Finland) Jarkko Nieminen	3	6	2
3	(France) Richard Gasquet	6	3	6
8	(France) Benoît Paire	4	6	6
(France) Michaël Llodra	6	3	1

Final
3	(France) Richard Gasquet	6	6
8	(France) Benoît Paire	2	3

=== Top half ===
First round
(Finland) J Nieminen	6	6
Q	(France) F Serra	3	2
(France) É Roger-Vasselin	6	6^{5}	5
(Japan) T Ito	3	7^{7}	7
(Ukraine) S Stakhovsky	6	6
9	(France) P-H Mathieu	4	4
(France) G Monfils	7	6
(Belgium) R Bemelmans	5	4
(Romania) V Hănescu	6	7^{8}
Q	(Spain) G Olaso	1	6^{6}
(Romania) A Ungur	3	2^{r}
6/WC	(France) J Benneteau	6	4

Second round
5	(Russia) N Davydenko	3	6^{8}
(Finland) J Nieminen	6	7^{10}
(Japan) T Ito	7^{7}	4	6^{3}
(Ukraine) S Stakhovsky	6^{4}	6	7^{7}
3	(France) R Gasquet	6	2	6
(France) G Monfils	3	6	3
(Romania) V Hănescu	4	4
6/WC	(France) J Benneteau	6	6

Quarterfinals
(Finland) J Nieminen	4	6	7^{7}
(Ukraine) S Stakhovsky	6	3	6^{3}
3	(France) R Gasquet	6	4	6
6/WC	(France) J Benneteau	1	6	1

Semifinals
(Finland) J Nieminen	3	6	2
3	(France) R Gasquet	6	3	6

=== Bottom half ===
First round
8	(France) B Paire	6	6
Q	(Spain) A Menéndez	0	2
WC	(France) A Mannarino	4	6^{0}
(Belgium) S Darcis	6	7^{7}
Q	(Spain) A Brugués Davi	6^{5}	6	7^{7}
(Kazakhstan) M Kukushkin	7^{7}	3	6^{3}
7	(Serbia) V Troicki	6	7
WC	(France) L Pouille	4	5
(Czech Republic) J Hájek	2	7	6
(Israel) D Sela	6	5	1
LL	(France) K de Schepper	3	3
(France) M Llodra	6	6

Second round
8	(France) B Paire	4	7^{13}	6
(Belgium) S Darcis	6	6^{11}	4
Q	(Spain) A Brugués Davi	6^{5}	2
4	(France) G Simon	7^{7}	6
7	(Serbia) V Troicki	0	2^{r}
(Czech Republic) J Hájek	6	4
(France) M Llodra	6	7^{7}
2	(Serbia) J Tipsarević	3	6^{4}

Quarterfinals
8	(France) B Paire	7	7^{7}
4	(France) G Simon	5	6^{4}
(Czech Republic) J Hájek	6^{3}	1
(France) M Llodra	7^{7}	6

Semifinals
8	(France) B Paire	4	6	6
(France) M Llodra	6	3	1

== Qualifying ==
=== Seeds ===
1. (France) Kenny de Schepper (qualifying competition, lucky loser)
2. (France) Josselin Ouanna (qualifying competition)
3. (Russia) Dmitry Tursunov (qualifying competition)
4. (France) Florent Serra (qualified)
5. (France) Marc Gicquel (qualifying competition)
6. (France) Jonathan Dasnières de Veigy (first round)
7. (Russia) Igor Kunitsyn (first round)
8. (Spain) Arnau Brugués Davi (qualified)

=== Qualifiers ===
1. (Spain) Adrián Menéndez
2. (Spain) Arnau Brugués Davi
3. (Spain) Guillermo Olaso
4. (France) Florent Serra

=== Lucky loser ===
1. (France) Kenny de Schepper

=== Draw ===
==== First qualifier ====
First round
1	(France) Kenny de Schepper	6	6
(Zimbabwe) Takanyi Garanganga	1	3
(France) Fabrice Martin	4	6	6
(Spain) David Pérez Sanz	6	3	2
(France) Elie Rousset	2	4
(Spain) Adrián Menéndez	6	6
(France) Mathieu Rodrigues	5	6	6
7	(Russia) Igor Kunitsyn	7	4	4

Second round
1	(France) Kenny de Schepper	6	7^{7}
(France) Fabrice Martin	3	6^{3}
(Spain) Adrián Menéndez	6	6^{3}	6
(France) Mathieu Rodrigues	4	7^{7}	2

Qualifying competition
1	(France) Kenny de Schepper	7^{7}	3	4
(Spain) Adrián Menéndez	6^{5}	6	6

==== Second qualifier ====
First round
2	(France) Josselin Ouanna	6	6
WC	(France) Tak Khunn Wang	1	1
(Serbia) Danilo Petrović	6	7^{7}
(France) Grégoire Burquier	3	6^{3}
(France) Jules Marie	6	6
(Belgium) Yannick Mertens	1	4
(Italy) Riccardo Ghedin	3	5
8	(Spain) Arnau Brugués Davi	6	7

Second round
2	(France) Josselin Ouanna	6^{3}	6	6
(Serbia) Danilo Petrović	7^{7}	2	4
(France) Jules Marie	7^{10}	2	1
8	(Spain) Arnau Brugués Davi	6^{8}	6	6

Qualifying competition
2	(France) Josselin Ouanna	6^{2}	4
8	(Spain) Arnau Brugués Davi	7^{7}	6

==== Third qualifier ====
First round
3	(Russia) Dmitry Tursunov	7	7^{7}
(France) Vincent Millot	5	6^{4}
(Serbia) Arsenije Zlatanović	6	5	4
WC	(Spain) Iván Arenas-Gualda	4	7	6
(Spain) Guillermo Olaso	7^{7}	6
(France) Yannick Jankovits	6^{5}	0
(France) Nicolas Devilder	6	7^{7}
6	(France) Jonathan Dasnières de Veigy	3	6^{4}

Second round
3	(Russia) Dmitry Tursunov	6	6
WC	(Spain) Iván Arenas-Gualda	4	1
(Spain) Guillermo Olaso	3	7^{8}	6
(France) Nicolas Devilder	6	6^{6}	4

Qualifying competition
3	(Russia) Dmitry Tursunov	6	3	5
(Spain) Guillermo Olaso	1	6	7

==== Fourth qualifier ====
First round
4	(France) Florent Serra	6	6
(Germany) Andre Begemann	3	4
(Australia) John Peers	6	6^{1}	2
(France) Romain Jouan	3	7^{7}	6
WC	(Germany) Sami Reinwein	7^{7}	6
(Spain) Enrique López Pérez	6^{3}	4
WC	(France) Dorian Descloix	6^{0}	2
5	(France) Marc Gicquel	7^{7}	6

Second round
4	(France) Florent Serra	7^{7}	7
(France) Romain Jouan	6^{0}	5
WC	(Germany) Sami Reinwein	4	6	6^{2}
5	(France) Marc Gicquel	6	3	7^{7}

Qualifying competition
4	(France) Florent Serra	7^{7}	6
5	(France) Marc Gicquel	6^{3}	3
