= 2014 Open Sud de France – Doubles =

Doubles
- 2014 Open Sud de France

Final
- Champions: (Russia) Nikolay Davydenko (Uzbekistan) Denis Istomin
- Runners-up: (France) Marc Gicquel (France) Nicolas Mahut
- Score: 6–4, 1–6, [10–7]

Details
- Draw: 16
- Seeds: 4

Events
Singles	Doubles
← 2013 ·	Open Sud de France	· 2015 →

Marc Gicquel and Michaël Llodra were the defending champions, but Llodra decided not to participate. Gicquel played alongside Nicolas Mahut, but lost in the final to Nikolay Davydenko and Denis Istomin, 4–6, 6–1, [7–10].

== Seeds ==
1. (Germany) Andre Begemann / (Germany) Martin Emmrich (quarterfinals)
2. (Australia) Rameez Junaid / (Pakistan) Aisam-ul-Haq Qureshi (semifinals)
3. (Australia) Paul Hanley / (United Kingdom) Jonathan Marray (quarterfinals)
4. (United Kingdom) Ken Skupski / (United Kingdom) Neal Skupski (quarterfinals)

== Draw ==
=== Key ===
- Q = Qualifier
- WC = Wild card
- LL = Lucky loser
- Alt = Alternate
- SE = Special exempt
- PR = Protected ranking
- ITF = ITF entry
- JE = Junior exempt
- w/o = Walkover
- r = Retired
- d = Defaulted
- SR = Special ranking

=== Draw ===
First round
1	(Germany) A Begemann (Germany) M Emmrich	6	7^{7}
(United Kingdom) J Delgado (Sweden) A Siljeström	3	6^{1}
WC	(France) D Descloix (France) G Monfils
(Finland) H Kontinen (Finland) J Nieminen	w/o
3	(Australia) P Hanley (United Kingdom) J Marray	7	6
(Russia) T Gabashvili (Portugal) J Sousa	5	0
(France) M Gicquel (France) N Mahut	6	7^{7}
(United States) J Cerretani (Canada) A Shamasdin	1	6^{2}
(Russia) N Davydenko (Uzbekistan) D Istomin	4	6	[10]
(Kazakhstan) O Nedovyesov (Poland) M Przysiężny	6	4	[4]
(France) K de Schepper (France) F Martin	4	6	[13]
4	(United Kingdom) K Skupski (United Kingdom) N Skupski	6	3	[15]
WC	(France) G Rufin (France) G Simon	6	4	[13]
(Germany) G Kretschmer (Germany) A Satschko	1	6	[11]
(Germany) D Brown (United States) A Krajicek	7^{16}	6^{5}	[7]
2	(Australia) R Junaid (Pakistan) A-u-H Qureshi	6^{14}	7^{7}	[10]

Quarterfinals
1	(Germany) A Begemann (Germany) M Emmrich	6^{5}	3
(Finland) H Kontinen (Finland) J Nieminen	7^{7}	6
3	(Australia) P Hanley (United Kingdom) J Marray	4	6^{4}
(France) M Gicquel (France) N Mahut	6	7^{7}
(Russia) N Davydenko (Uzbekistan) D Istomin	6	6
4	(United Kingdom) K Skupski (United Kingdom) N Skupski	4	4
WC	(France) G Rufin (France) G Simon	3	0
2	(Australia) R Junaid (Pakistan) A-u-H Qureshi	6	6

Semifinals
(Finland) H Kontinen (Finland) J Nieminen	3	2
(France) M Gicquel (France) N Mahut	6	6
(Russia) N Davydenko (Uzbekistan) D Istomin	3	6	[10]
2	(Australia) R Junaid (Pakistan) A-u-H Qureshi	6	3	[7]

Final
(France) M Gicquel (France) N Mahut	4	6	[7]
(Russia) N Davydenko (Uzbekistan) D Istomin	6	1	[10]
