= 2013 Open Sud de France =

- Date: 4–10 February 2013
- Edition: 26th
- Category: World Tour 250
- Draw: 28S / 16D
- Prize money: €467,800
- Surface: Hard (indoor)
- Location: Montpellier, France

Champions

Singles
- (France) Richard Gasquet

Doubles
- (France) Marc Gicquel / (France) Michaël Llodra
← 2012 ·	Open Sud de France	· 2014 →

The 2013 Open Sud de France was a men's tennis tournament played on indoor hard courts. It was the 26th edition of the Open Sud de France, and part of the ATP World Tour 250 Series of the 2013 ATP World Tour. It took place at the Arena Montpellier in Montpellier, France, from 4 February until 10 February 2013. Third-seeded Richard Gasquet won the singles title.

== Finals ==
=== Singles ===
(Czech Republic) Tomáš Berdych defeated (France) Gaël Monfils, 6–2, 4–6, 6–3

- It was Berdych's 1st title of the year and 7th of his career.

=== Doubles ===
(France) Nicolas Mahut / (France) Édouard Roger-Vasselin defeated (Australia) Paul Hanley / (United Kingdom) Jamie Murray, 6–4, 7–6^{(7–4)}

== Singles main draw entrants ==
=== Seeds ===
Country	Player	Rank^{1}	Seed
~~CZE~~	~~Tomáš Berdych~~	~~6~~	~~1~~
SRB	Janko Tipsarević	9	2
FRA	Richard Gasquet	10	3
FRA	Gilles Simon	14	4
RUS	Nikolay Davydenko	37	5
FRA	Julien Benneteau	38	6
SRB	Viktor Troicki	39	7
FRA	Benoît Paire	42	8
FRA	Paul-Henri Mathieu	54	9

- Rankings are as of January 28, 2013.

=== Other entrants ===
The following players received wildcards into the singles main draw:

- (France) Julien Benneteau
- (France) Adrian Mannarino
- (France) Lucas Pouille

The following players received entry from the qualifying draw:

- (Spain) Arnau Brugués-Davi
- (Spain) Adrián Menéndez
- (Spain) Guillermo Olaso
- (France) Florent Serra

The following player received entry as a lucky loser:

- (France) Kenny de Schepper

=== Withdrawals ===
Before the tournament

- (Spain) Roberto Bautista-Agut
- (Czech Republic) Tomáš Berdych (left wrist injury)
- (France) Nicolas Mahut
- (Belgium) Xavier Malisse
- (Estonia) Jürgen Zopp

=== Retirements ===
- (Serbia) Viktor Troicki
- (Romania) Adrian Ungur

== Doubles main draw entrants ==
=== Seeds ===
Country	Player	Country	Player	Rank^{1}	Seed
GBR	Colin Fleming	GBR	Jonathan Marray	41	1
USA	Eric Butorac	AUS	Paul Hanley	72	2
PHI	Treat Conrad Huey	GBR	Dominic Inglot	77	3
GBR	Jamie Delgado	GBR	Ken Skupski	115	3

- Rankings are as of January 28, 2013.

=== Other entrants ===
The following pairs received wildcards into the doubles main draw:

- (France) Kenny de Schepper / (France) Fabrice Martin
- (France) Gaël Monfils / (France) Josselin Ouanna
