= 2013 Open Sud de France – Doubles =

Doubles
- 2013 Open Sud de France

Final
- Champions: (France) Marc Gicquel (France) Michaël Llodra
- Runners-up: (Sweden) Johan Brunström (South Africa) Raven Klaasen
- Score: 6–3, 3–6, [11–9]

Details
- Draw: 16
- Seeds: 4

Events
| Singles | Doubles |
| ← 2012 · | Open Sud de France | · 2014 → |

Nicolas Mahut and Édouard Roger-Vasselin were the defending champions, but Mahut decided not to participate.
Roger-Vasselin played alongside Benoît Paire, but lost in the first round to Johan Brunström and Raven Klaasen.
Marc Gicquel and Michaël Llodra won the title, defeating Brunström and Klaasen 6–3, 3–6, [11–9] in the final.

== Seeds ==
1. (United Kingdom) Colin Fleming / (United Kingdom) Jonathan Marray (semifinals)
2. (United States) Eric Butorac / (Australia) Paul Hanley (quarterfinals)
3. (Philippines) Treat Conrad Huey / (United Kingdom) Dominic Inglot (quarterfinals)
4. (United Kingdom) Jamie Delgado / (United Kingdom) Ken Skupski (quarterfinals)

== Draw ==
=== Key ===
- Q = Qualifier
- WC = Wild card
- LL = Lucky loser
- Alt = Alternate
- SE = Special exempt
- PR = Protected ranking
- ITF = ITF entry
- JE = Junior exempt
- w/o = Walkover
- r = Retired
- d = Defaulted
- SR = Special ranking

=== Draw ===
First round
1 | (United Kingdom) C Fleming (United Kingdom) J Marray | 7 | 7^{7}
WC | (France) G Monfils (France) J Ouanna | 5 | 6^{5}
(France) F Serra (France) G Simon | 7^{7} | 7^{9}
(United States) J Cerretani (Canada) A Shamasdin | 6^{2} | 6^{7}
4 | (United Kingdom) J Delgado (United Kingdom) K Skupski | 7 | 5 | [10]
(Germany) A Begemann (Germany) M Emmrich | 5 | 7 | [5]
(France) B Paire (France) É Roger-Vasselin | 2 | 3
(Sweden) J Brunström (South Africa) R Klaasen | 6 | 6
(Australia) R Junaid (Finland) J Nieminen | 6^{2} | 2
(United Kingdom) J Murray (Australia) J Peers | 7^{7} | 6
(Thailand) Sa Ratiwatana (Thailand) So Ratiwatana | 3 | 3
3 | (Philippines) TC Huey (United Kingdom) D Inglot | 6 | 6
WC | (France) K de Schepper (France) F Martin | 6^{2} | 6^{3}
(France) M Gicquel (France) M Llodra | 7^{7} | 7^{7}
(Romania) V Hănescu (Belgium) D Norman | 3 | 7^{7} | [6]
2 | (United States) E Butorac (Australia) P Hanley | 6 | 6^{5} | [10]

Quarterfinals
1 | (United Kingdom) C Fleming (United Kingdom) J Marray | 6 | 6
(France) F Serra (France) G Simon | 4 | 1
4 | (United Kingdom) J Delgado (United Kingdom) K Skupski | 2 | 3
(Sweden) J Brunström (South Africa) R Klaasen | 6 | 6
(United Kingdom) J Murray (Australia) J Peers | 6 | 6
3 | (Philippines) TC Huey (United Kingdom) D Inglot | 4 | 2
(France) M Gicquel (France) M Llodra | 4 | 6 | [10]
2 | (United States) E Butorac (Australia) P Hanley | 6 | 3 | [6]

Semifinals
1 | (United Kingdom) C Fleming (United Kingdom) J Marray | 7^{9} | 6^{3} | [10]
(Sweden) J Brunström (South Africa) R Klaasen | 6^{7} | 7^{7} | [12]
(United Kingdom) J Murray (Australia) J Peers | 6^{9} | 6 | [6]
(France) M Gicquel (France) M Llodra | 7^{11} | 3 | [10]

Final
(Sweden) J Brunström (South Africa) R Klaasen | 3 | 6 | [9]
(France) M Gicquel (France) M Llodra | 6 | 3 | [11]
