= 2015 Open Sud de France =

Tennis tournament

- Date: 2–8 February 2015
- Edition: 28th
- Draw: 28S / 16D
- Prize money: €494,310
- Surface: Hard (Indoor)
- Location: Montpellier, France

Champions

Singles
- (France) Richard Gasquet

Doubles
- (New Zealand) Marcus Daniell / (New Zealand) Artem Sitak
← 2014 ·	Open Sud de France	· 2016 →

The 2015 Open Sud de France was a tennis tournament played on indoor hard courts. It was the 28th edition of the Open Sud de France, and part of the ATP World Tour 250 Series of the 2015 ATP World Tour. It took place at the Arena Montpellier in Montpellier, France, from February 2 to February 8, 2015.

== Finals ==
=== Singles ===
- (France) Richard Gasquet defeated (Poland) Jerzy Janowicz, 3–0, retired

=== Doubles ===
- (New Zealand) Marcus Daniell / (New Zealand) Artem Sitak defeated (United Kingdom) Dominic Inglot / (Romania) Florin Mergea, 3–6, 6–4, [16–14]

== Points and prize money ==
=== Point distribution ===
Event	W	F	SF	QF	Round of 16	Round of 32	Q	Q3	Q2	Q1
Singles	250	150	90	45	20	0	12	6	0	0
Doubles	250	150	90	45	0	—	—	—	—	—

=== Prize money ===
Event	W	F	SF	QF	Round of 16	Round of 32	Q3	Q2	Q1
Singles	€80,000	€42,100	€22,800	€12,990	€7,655	€4,535	€730	€350	—
Doubles *	€24,280	€12,760	€6,920	€3,960	€2,320	—	—	—	—
Doubles prize money per team

== Singles main draw entrants ==
=== Seeds ===
Country	Player	Rank^{1}	Seed
FRA	Gaël Monfils	19	1
FRA	Gilles Simon	20	2
GER	Philipp Kohlschreiber	24	3
FRA	Richard Gasquet	28	4
POL	Jerzy Janowicz	44	5
UZB	Denis Istomin	50	6
POR	João Sousa	55	7
GER	Jan-Lennard Struff	57	8

- Rankings are as of January 19, 2015.

=== Other entrants ===
The following players received wildcards into the singles main draw:

- (France) Laurent Lokoli
- (France) Vincent Millot
- (France) Lucas Pouille

The following players received entry from the qualifying draw:

- (Georgia (country)) Nikoloz Basilashvili
- (Japan) Taro Daniel
- (Belgium) Steve Darcis
- (Estonia) Jürgen Zopp

=== Withdrawals ===
Before the tournament

- (France) Julien Benneteau → replaced by (France) Benoît Paire
- (Kazakhstan) Andrey Golubev → replaced by (Germany) Andreas Beck
- (Russia) Andrey Kuznetsov → replaced by (Russia) Alexander Kudryavtsev

=== Retirements ===
- (Poland) Jerzy Janowicz (illness)
- (Tunisia) Malek Jaziri (right elbow injury)

== Doubles main draw entrants ==
=== Seeds ===
Country	Player	Country	Player	Rank^{1}	Seed
GBR	Dominic Inglot	ROU	Florin Mergea	69	1
AUT	Philipp Oswald	PAK	Aisam-ul-Haq Qureshi	86	2
CRO	Mate Pavić	BRA	André Sá	131	3
GBR	Colin Fleming	GBR	Jonathan Marray	132	4

- Rankings are as of January 19, 2015.

=== Other entrants ===
The following pairs received wildcards into the doubles main draw:

- (France) Dorian Descloix / (France) Gaël Monfils
- (France) Laurent Lokoli / (Germany) Alexander Zverev

=== Withdrawals ===
During the tournament

- (Tunisia) Malek Jaziri (right elbow injury)
