= 2015 Open Sud de France – Singles =

Singles
- 2015 Open Sud de France

Final
- Champion: (France) Richard Gasquet
- Runner-up: (Poland) Jerzy Janowicz
- Score: 3–0, ret.

Details
- Draw: 28
- Seeds: 8

Events
Singles	Doubles
- Open Sud de France

Gaël Monfils was the defending champion, but lost to Richard Gasquet in the semifinals.
Gasquet went on to win the title, defeating Jerzy Janowicz in the final, 3–0, ret.

== Seeds ==
The first four seeds received a bye into the second round.

1. (France) Gaël Monfils (semifinals)
2. (France) Gilles Simon (quarterfinals)
3. (Germany) Philipp Kohlschreiber (quarterfinals)
4. (France) Richard Gasquet (champion)
5. (Poland) Jerzy Janowicz (final, retired due to illness)
6. (Uzbekistan) Denis Istomin (quarterfinals)
7. (Portugal) João Sousa (semifinals)
8. (Germany) Jan-Lennard Struff (first round)

== Draw ==
Key

- Q = Qualifier
- WC = Wild card
- LL = Lucky loser
- Alt = Alternate
- ITF = ITF entry
- PR = Protected ranking
- SR = Special ranking
- SE = Special exempt
- JE = Junior exempt
- JR = Junior Accelerator Programme entrant
- CO = College Accelerator Programme entrant
- NG = Next Gen Accelerator Program entrant
- w/o = Walkover
- r = Retired
- d = Defaulted

=== Finals ===
Semifinals
1	(France) Gaël Monfils	4	3
4	(France) Richard Gasquet	6	6
7	(Portugal) João Sousa	6^{9}	6	1
5	(Poland) Jerzy Janowicz	7^{11}	3	6

Final
4	(France) Richard Gasquet	3
5	(Poland) Jerzy Janowicz	0^{r}

=== Top half ===
First round
(France) K de Schepper	6	3	6
(Turkey) M İlhan	4	6	3
Q	(Belgium) S Darcis	6	6
(Japan) T Ito	2	2
(Finland) J Nieminen	7^{7}	6
8	(Germany) J-L Struff	6^{5}	3
WC	(France) L Pouille	6	7^{7}
(Russia) A Kudryavtsev	4	6^{4}
(Israel) D Sela	6	6
Q	(Estonia) J Zopp	3	4
(Tunisia) M Jaziri	6	0^{r}
6	(Uzbekistan) D Istomin	3	0

Second round
1	(France) G Monfils	6	7^{7}
(France) K de Schepper	4	6^{3}
Q	(Belgium) S Darcis	6	7^{7}
(Finland) J Nieminen	2	6^{3}
4	(France) R Gasquet	6	7^{8}
WC	(France) L Pouille	3	6^{6}
(Israel) D Sela	6^{1}	2
6	(Uzbekistan) D Istomin	7^{7}	6

Quarterfinals
1	(France) G Monfils	4	6	6
Q	(Belgium) S Darcis	6	2	3
4	(France) R Gasquet	6	6
6	(Uzbekistan) D Istomin	3	4

Semifinals
1	(France) G Monfils	4	3
4	(France) R Gasquet	6	6

=== Bottom half ===
First round
7	(Portugal) J Sousa	6	6
WC	(France) L Lokoli	2	4
(Germany) T Kamke	2	6	7
WC	(France) V Millot	6	3	5
Q	(Japan) T Daniel	3	7^{7}	1
(France) P-H Mathieu	6	6^{5}	6
5	(Poland) J Janowicz	2	7^{7}	7
(Germany) D Brown	6	6^{1}	5
Q	(Georgia (country)) N Basilashvili	7	2	4
(France) B Paire	5	6	6
(France) É Roger-Vasselin	3	6	6
(Germany) A Beck	6	3	4

Second round
7	(Portugal) J Sousa	4	6	6
(Germany) T Kamke	6	4	3
(France) P-H Mathieu	6	6^{5}	4
3	(Germany) P Kohlschreiber	3	7^{7}	6
5	(Poland) J Janowicz	6	3	6
(France) B Paire	2	6	3
(France) É Roger-Vasselin	3	3
2	(France) G Simon	6	6

Quarterfinals
7	(Portugal) J Sousa	7^{7}	6
3	(Germany) P Kohlschreiber	6^{5}	4
5	(Poland) J Janowicz	6	7
2	(France) G Simon	2	5

Semifinals
7	(Portugal) J Sousa	6^{9}	6	1
5	(Poland) J Janowicz	7^{11}	3	6

== Qualifying ==
=== Seeds ===
1. (Belgium) Steve Darcis (qualified)
2. (Germany) Alexander Zverev (qualifying competition)
3. (Georgia (country)) Nikoloz Basilashvili (qualified)
4. (Japan) Taro Daniel (qualified)
5. (Estonia) Jürgen Zopp (qualified)
6. (France) Enzo Couacaud (qualifying competition)
7. (Italy) Thomas Fabbiano (qualifying competition)
8. (France) Mathias Bourgue (first round)

=== Qualifiers ===
1. (Belgium) Steve Darcis
2. (Estonia) Jürgen Zopp
3. (Georgia (country)) Nikoloz Basilashvili
4. (Japan) Taro Daniel

=== Qualifying draw ===
==== First qualifier ====
First round
1	(Belgium) Steve Darcis	7^{7}	7^{8}
(Lithuania) Laurynas Grigelis	6^{1}	6^{6}
(Russia) Alexander Lobkov	2	1
(France) Grégoire Barrère	6	6
WC	(France) Élie Rousset	6	6
(Russia) Stanislav Vovk	0	0
(Croatia) Mate Pavić	4	6	3
7	(Italy) Thomas Fabbiano	6	2	6

Second round
1	(Belgium) Steve Darcis	7^{7}	7
(France) Grégoire Barrère	6^{1}	5
WC	(France) Élie Rousset	3	2
7	(Italy) Thomas Fabbiano	6	6

Qualifying competition
1	(Belgium) Steve Darcis	6	6
7	(Italy) Thomas Fabbiano	3	3

==== Second qualifier ====
First round
2	(Germany) Alexander Zverev	6	6
WC	(France) Thomas Laurent	4	2
PR	(Spain) Andrés Artuñedo Martínavarro	2	4
(France) Maxime Teixeira	6	6
(France) Grégoire Burquier	7^{13}	6
WC	(France) Dorian Descloix	6^{11}	2
(France) Julien Obry	7	0	3
5	(Estonia) Jürgen Zopp	5	6	6

Second round
2	(Germany) Alexander Zverev	6	7
(France) Maxime Teixeira	4	5
(France) Grégoire Burquier	6^{3}	6^{5}
5	(Estonia) Jürgen Zopp	7^{7}	7^{7}

Qualifying competition
2	(Germany) Alexander Zverev	4	7^{8}	4
5	(Estonia) Jürgen Zopp	6	6^{6}	6

==== Third qualifier ====
First round
3	(Georgia (country)) Nikoloz Basilashvili	6	6
WC	(France) Geoffrey Blancaneaux	4	0
(France) Florent Serra	6	6
(Italy) Claudio Fortuna	4	4
(France) Yannick Jankovits	6	1	7^{7}
(Spain) David Pérez Sanz	2	6	6^{3}
(France) Constant Lestienne	6	7
8	(France) Mathias Bourgue	3	5

Second round
3	(Georgia (country)) Nikoloz Basilashvili	6	6
(France) Florent Serra	0	3
(France) Yannick Jankovits	4	6	6
(France) Constant Lestienne	6	2	1

Qualifying competition
3	(Georgia (country)) Nikoloz Basilashvili	6	6
(France) Yannick Jankovits	3	1

==== Fourth qualifier ====
First round
4	(Japan) Taro Daniel	6	7
(Republic of Ireland) Sam Barry	2	5
(Italy) Flavio Cipolla	6^{6}	6	4
(New Zealand) Marcus Daniell	7^{8}	2	6
(France) Hugo Nys	6	7^{7}
(France) Maxime Chazal	3	6^{5}
(France) Jules Marie	3	5
6	(France) Enzo Couacaud	6	7

Second round
4	(Japan) Taro Daniel	6	6
(New Zealand) Marcus Daniell	3	3
(France) Hugo Nys	6	5	1
6	(France) Enzo Couacaud	2	7	6

Qualifying competition
4	(Japan) Taro Daniel	6	4	6
6	(France) Enzo Couacaud	4	6	4
