= Neustift-Innermanzing =

- Municipality
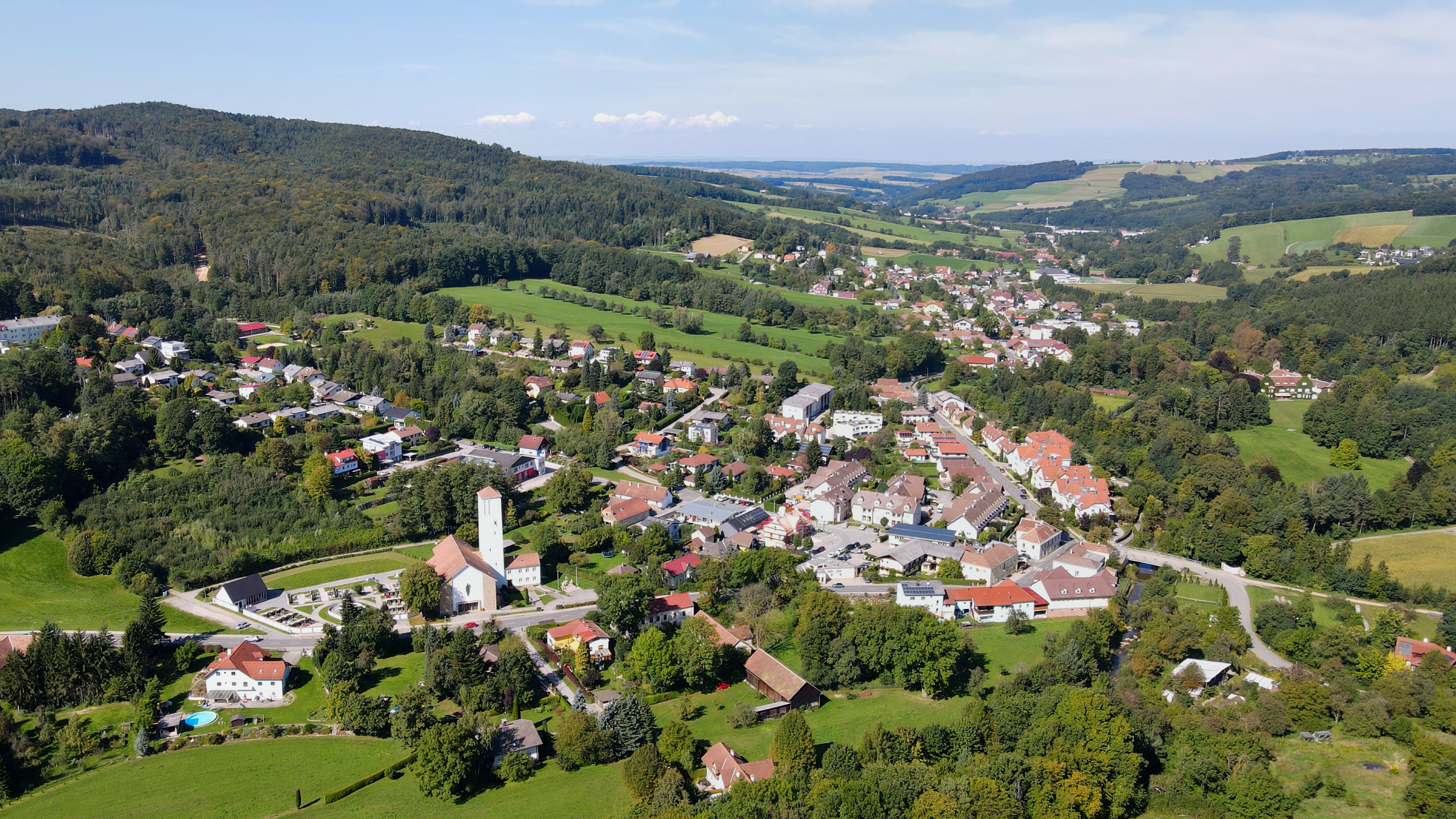

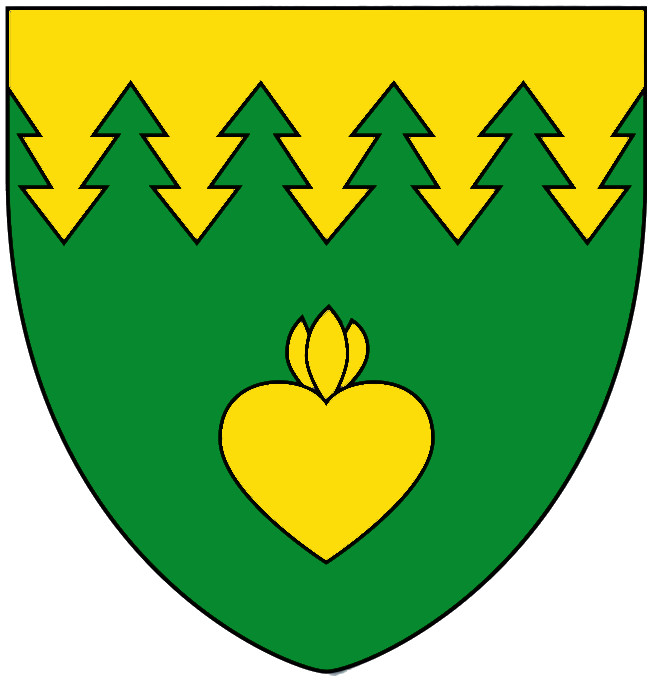
- Coat of arms

- Location within Austria
- Coordinates: 48.13648°N 15.91135°E
- Country: Austria
- State: Lower Austria
- District: Sankt Pölten-Land

Government
  - Mayor: Irmgard Schibich

Area
  - Total: 14.91 km^{2} (5.76 sq mi)
- Elevation: 298 m (978 ft)

Population (2018-01-01)
  - Total: 1,543
  - Density: 103.5/km^{2} (268.0/sq mi)
- Time zone: UTC+1 (CET)
  - Summer (DST): UTC+2 (CEST)
- Postal code: 3052
- Area code: 02774
- Vehicle registration: PL
- Website: www.neustift-innermanzing.at

Neustift-Innermanzing is a municipality in the district of Sankt Pölten-Land in the Austrian state of Lower Austria.

== Population ==
Historical population
Year	Pop.	±%
1971	696	—
1981	976	+40.2%
1991	1,086	+11.3%
2001	1,281	+18.0%
