= Jerzy Janowicz =

Polish tennis player (born 1990)

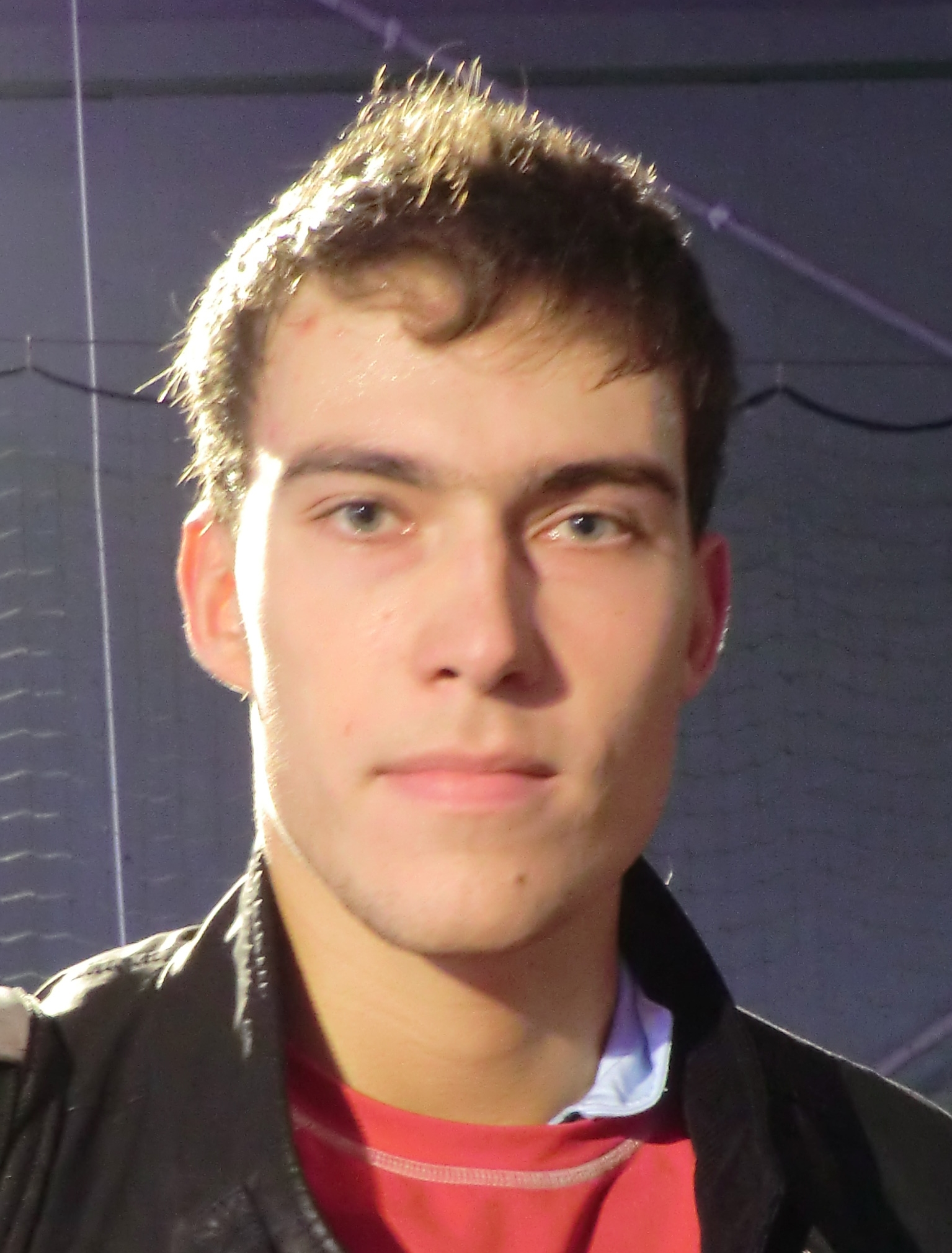
- Janowicz in 2010
- Country (sports): Poland
- Residence: Łódź, Poland
- Born: 13 November 1990 (age 36) Łódź, Poland
- Height: 2.04 m (6 ft 8 in)
- Turned pro: 2007
- Retired: 2022 (last match played)
- Plays: Right-handed (two-handed backhand)
- Prize money: US $3,769,423
- Official website: jerzy-janowicz.com

Singles
- Career record: 102–95
- Career titles: 0
- Highest ranking: No. 14 (12 August 2013)

Grand Slam singles results
- Australian Open: 3R (2013, 2014, 2015)
- French Open: 3R (2013, 2014)
- Wimbledon: SF (2013)
- US Open: 2R (2014)

Doubles
- Career record: 15–20
- Career titles: 0
- Highest ranking: No. 47 (19 August 2013)

Grand Slam doubles results
- Australian Open: 2R (2013, 2016)
- French Open: QF (2013)
- Wimbledon: Q1 (2012)
- US Open: 1R (2013, 2015)

Team competitions
- Hopman Cup: W (2015)

Jerzy Filip Janowicz Jr. (Polish pronunciation: [ˈjɛʐɨ jaˈnɔvʲitʂ]; born 13 November 1990) is a Polish former professional tennis player and current padel player. Janowicz is best known for becoming the first Polish man to reach a major semifinal, at the 2013 Wimbledon Championships. Despite never winning an ATP Tour title, Janowicz obtained a career-high singles ranking of world No. 14 in August 2013. He also achieved a doubles best ranking of No. 47 in the same month of that year.

Having finished as runner-up at two junior major tournaments, Janowicz rose to prominence on the pro circuit leading up to and following his run to the final, as a qualifier, of the 2012 Paris Masters, during which he defeated five top-20 players such as Andy Murray and Janko Tipsarević. Despite losing to David Ferrer in the finals, he made his top-30 debut in the ATP rankings and became the Polish No. 1.

Janowicz was awarded the Gold Cross of Merit by Polish President Bronisław Komorowski in 2013 for his achievements. Noted for his very powerful serve, Janowicz could hit at up to 249 km/h (155 mph) along with strong groundstrokes.

== Coaching ==
Janowicz was coached by Günter Bresnik and his strength and conditioning coach is Piotr Grabia.

== Early life ==
Born in Łódź, Poland Janowicz began playing tennis at the age of five after his parents introduced him to the sport. Father Jerzy and mother Anna Szalbot were both professional volleyball players. Janowicz has named Pete Sampras as his inspiration. Every October Janowicz and his team run the annual Atlas Jerzyk Cup tennis tournament in Łódź, Poland promoting the sport to young children, ages 8 to 12 years old.

== Career ==
=== Juniors ===
Janowicz inherits his athleticism and height from his parents, who were both volleyball players. At the age of 10 or 11, his parents sold off their chain of sports stores and apartments to support their son's training, recognizing that he had a future in tennis from a young age. As a junior, Janowicz posted a 59–23 win–loss record and reached a combined ranking of No. 5 in the world in 2008. He reached the boys' singles final at the 2007 US Open and 2008 French Open, losing in straight sets to Ričardas Berankis and Yang Tsung-hua, respectively.

=== 2012: Top 30 ATP ranking and breakthrough on ATP World Tour ===
Janowicz ended 2011 ranked 221 in the world. At the start of 2012 he could not play in the Australian Open due to lack of sponsorship. In February, he was the runner-up in a Challenger tournament in Wolfsburg, Germany. Later in the year, he won three Challenger tournament finals. At the French Open, he got as far as the third round of qualifying, but failed to make it into the main draw. At the Wimbledon Championships, he made it through the three rounds of qualifying to be in the main draw of a Grand Slam tournament for the first time, where he defeated a qualifier, Simone Bolelli, in the first round, Ernests Gulbis in the second, then lost to the 31st seed Florian Mayer in the third. At the US Open, he made it directly into a Grand Slam without having to compete in the qualifying rounds. He lost to young American wildcard Dennis Novikov.

In November 2012, Janowicz qualified for the main draw of the 2012 BNP Paribas Masters, an ATP 1000 tournament. He defeated world No. 19, Philipp Kohlschreiber, in the first round, the No. 14 Marin Čilić in the second and the No. 3 and Olympic gold medalist and US Open champion Andy Murray in the third. He defeated Murray in three sets, saving one match point en route. He said afterwards "This was the most unbelievable day in my life." In the quarterfinals, he defeated No. 9 Janko Tipsarević, to go on to play in the semifinals where he beat Frenchman and No. 20 Gilles Simon to reach his first ATP tour-level final. He was the first qualifier to do this since Andrei Pavel in 2003 and the first player to reach the final on his ATP World Tour Masters 1000 debut since Harel Levy in 2000. In the final, he was defeated by fourth seed David Ferrer, but afterwards said "I've got a lot of confidence right now. I learned if you have big heart and you want to do something amazing and you're going to fight for this, you have a big chance to make it." His run led him to the top 30 for the first time in his career, and he finished the year ranked No. 24, almost 200 places higher than the previous year.

=== 2013: World No. 14 and first Grand Slam semifinal ===
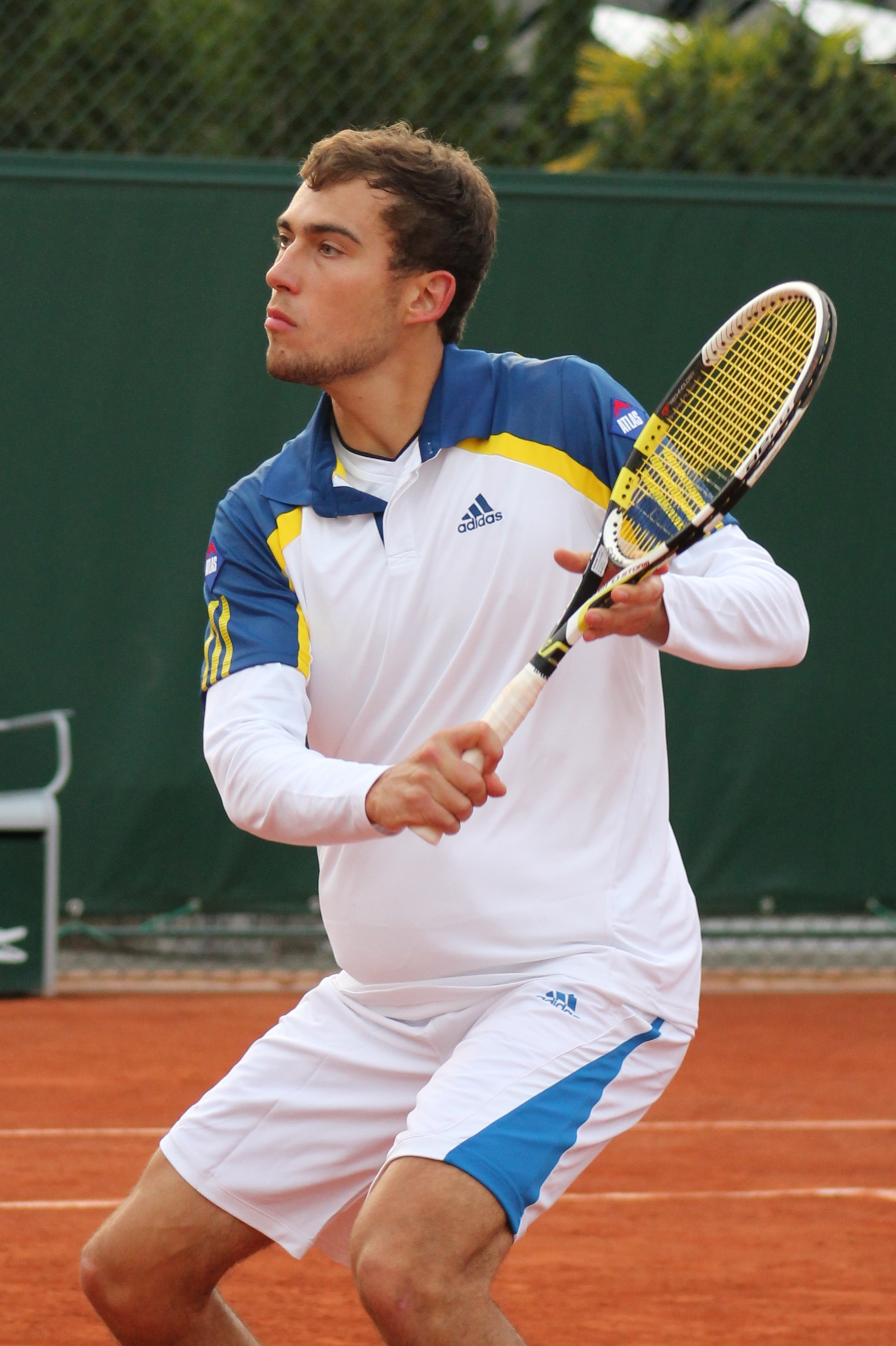
Janowicz at Roland Garros, 2013

Janowicz began his season at the Heineken Open in Auckland, New Zealand, where he was seeded fifth; however, he lost his opening match against American Brian Baker. He then competed for the first time in the main draw of the Australian Open, where he was the 24th seed, the first time he had been seeded at a Grand Slam tournament. He won his first two matches against Simone Bolelli in straight sets, and Somdev Devvarman of India, against whom he had to recover from a two-set deficit to win in five. In his third-round match, he lost to 10th seed Nicolás Almagro in straight sets.

He played the Indian Wells Masters, where he reached the third round and was eventually eliminated by Richard Gasquet. He then played at the Miami Masters, where he was seeded 21st, but lost his first match in the second round to Brazilian Thomaz Bellucci. At the Monte-Carlo Masters, he again lost his first match in the first round to South African, Kevin Anderson. He continued to play at the Madrid Masters, where he won his first-round match against Sam Querrey, but was eliminated in the second round by eventual semifinalist, Tomáš Berdych. He then played at the Italian Open, where he reached the quarterfinals with consecutive wins over two top-ten players, Richard Gasquet and Jo-Wilfried Tsonga. He lost to Roger Federer in the quarterfinals. Federer said: "He obviously has a big game, unconventional shot selection at times, but really fun to watch... I've got to be careful."

At the French Open, he reached the third round, where he was eliminated in four sets by Stan Wawrinka.

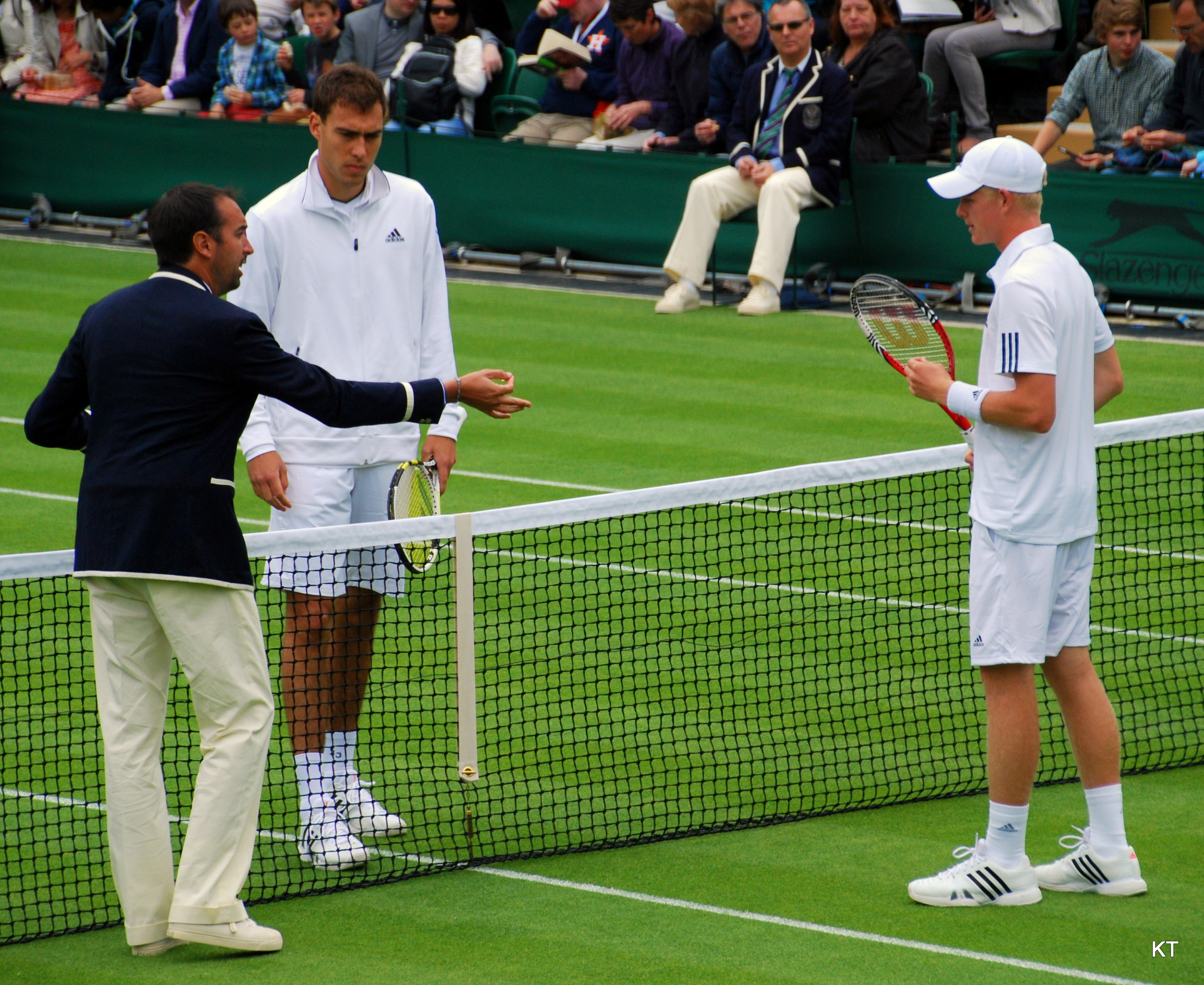
Jerzy at the 2013 Wimbledon Championships

At Wimbledon, he defeated Kyle Edmund, Radek Štěpánek and Nicolás Almagro for a spot in the round of 16 and Jürgen Melzer for a spot in his first career Grand Slam quarterfinal. He then beat fellow Pole Łukasz Kubot in straight sets, becoming the first Polish man to reach a Grand Slam semifinal. There, he was beaten by No. 2 and eventual champion Andy Murray in four sets.

He did not reach quarterfinals in his next few tournaments, falling to Fernando Verdasco by retirement in Hamburg Open and Rafael Nadal in two tight sets at the Rogers Cup. Janowicz actually served for the first set. His next result was a straight-set loss to James Blake in the Cincinnati Open first round.

Jerzy performed disappointingly in the US Open, falling to world No. 247 Máximo González in straight sets, suffering from a back injury. His back injury caused him to withdraw from next few tournaments. He returned in October to reach the quarterfinals at the Stockholm Open, where he lost to Ernests Gulbis in three sets, a player he had beaten in the previous year's Wimbledon in a long five-set match. Then he traveled to Valencia, where he reached the quarterfinals as well, losing to eventual runner-up David Ferrer.

Janowicz's last tournament of the year was the Paris Masters, where he had made his breakthrough the previous year. He won his opening meeting with Santiago Giraldo, but did not defend points due to his loss to top seed Rafael Nadal. Janowicz finished the season at No. 21.

=== 2014: Foot injury, and out of top 50 ===
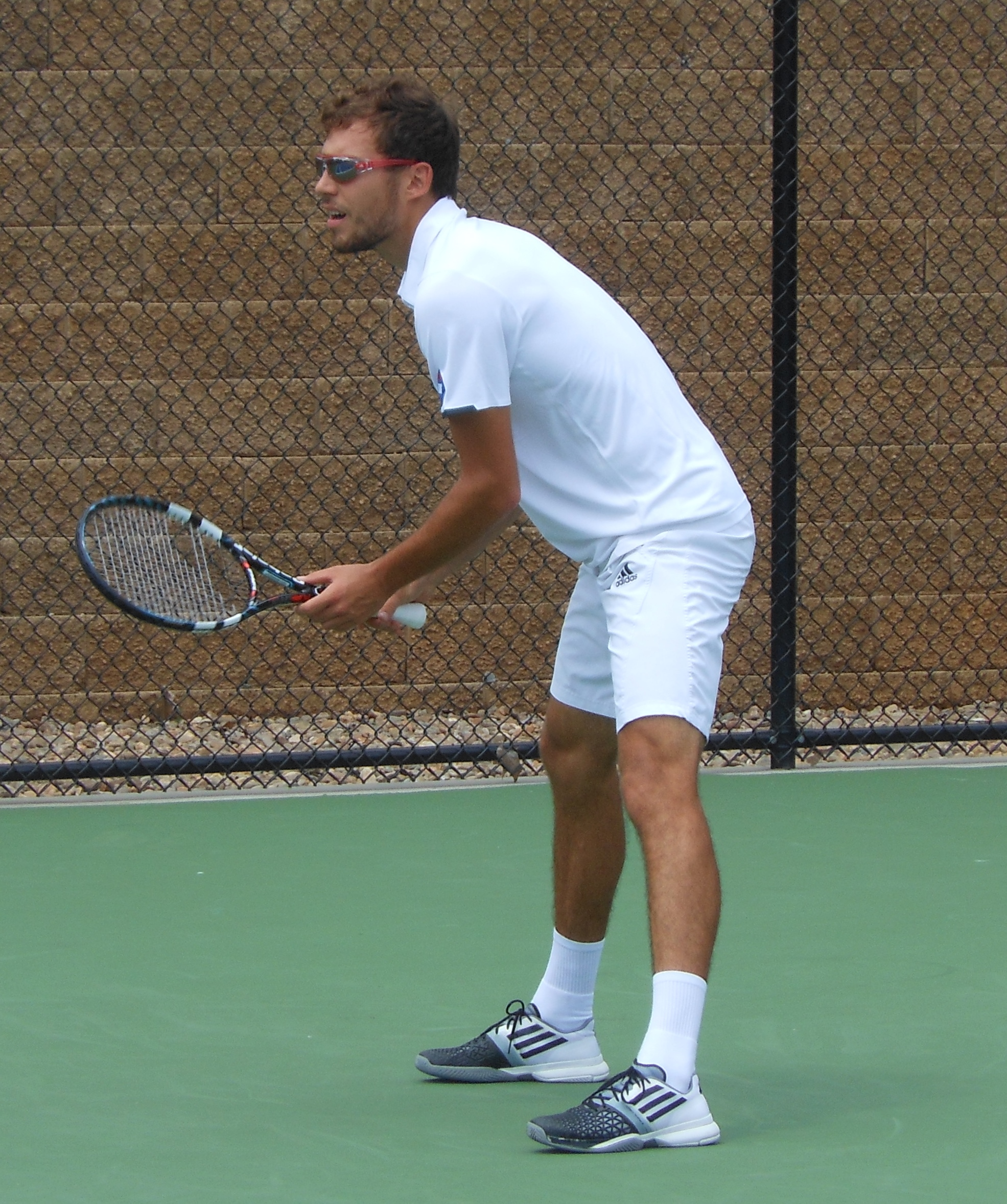
Jerzy at the 2014 Winston-Salem Open

Janowicz was to partner Agnieszka Radwańska in the Hopman Cup, the annual international mixed-team tournament in Perth, Western Australia, but was unable to do so due to a foot injury. He was replaced in the draw by Davis Cup teammate Grzegorz Panfil. Janowicz started his season at Sydney International, where he was seeded second, but lost his first match in the second round to Alexandr Dolgopolov. At the Australian Open, he beat Jordan Thompson in the first round and Pablo Andújar in the second round, then lost to Florian Mayer in the third round. After the match, Janowicz revealed that he had been playing with a broken bone in his foot, which was diagnosed during the off season. Janowicz continued at the Open Sud de France, where he won his second-round match against Adrian Mannarino and quarterfinal match against Édouard Roger-Vasselin. He then lost in the semifinals against Richard Gasquet in a tight match.

At ABN AMRO World Tennis Tournament in Rotterdam, Janowicz beat the previous year's finalist Julien Benneteau in the first round and Tommy Haas in the second round. He was defeated by Tomáš Berdych in the quarterfinals. Janowicz was due to play at Open 13 in Marseille, where he made it to the previous year's quarterfinals, but withdrew from the event to recover from a case of sinusitis. Next, Janowicz played at the BNP Paribas Open in Indian Wells, California, where he lost to Alejandro Falla in the second round. Similarly, he was defeated by Roberto Bautista Agut in the second round at the Sony Open Tennis ATP World Tour Masters 1000 in Miami. Additionally, he made an early exit at the Monte Carlo Rolex Masters, where he failed to make it past the first round, going down in straight sets against the French veteran Michaël Llodra. After early losses in Barcelona, Madrid, and Rome, Janowicz concentrated on getting ready for the French Open. At Roland Garros, Janowicz defeated Víctor Estrella Burgos and Jarkko Nieminen, then lost to Jo-Wilfried Tsonga in the third round.

Before Wimbledon, Janowicz played at Halle Open in Germany and at the Boodles Challenge in Buckinghamshire, England. At Wimbledon, he defeated Somdev Devvarman and Lleyton Hewitt, then lost to Tommy Robredo in five sets. This third-round loss to Robredo would mean a loss of 610 ranking points, and a significant drop in ranking, bringing him down to No. 51. Following Wimbledon, Janowicz competed at the Swedish Open in Båstad, where he was forced to retire in the first round due to a left foot injury. Subsequently, he entered the German Open Tennis Championships in Hamburg, where he was defeated by Alexandr Dolgopolov in the second round.

Janowicz began his US Open Series campaign at the Rogers Cup in Toronto, where he fell to Canadian wildcard Peter Polansky. At the Western & Southern Open, he defeated qualifier Teymuraz Gabashvili and Grigor Dimitrov, then lost to Julien Benneteau in the third round. After Cincinnati, Janowicz continued at Winston-Salem Open, where he defeated Carlos Berlocq, João Sousa, Édouard Roger-Vasselin, David Goffin, and Sam Querrey, then lost to Lukáš Rosol in the final despite having two championship points in the third set. Janowicz won his first career match at the US Open, defeating Dušan Lajović, then lost to 18th seed Kevin Anderson in four sets. He next participated at the Moselle Open in France, where he defeated Adrian Mannarino and Jarkko Nieminen, then lost to Gaël Monfils in the quarterfinals. He continued at the China Open, where he was defeated by Andy Murray in the first round. At the Shanghai Rolex Masters, he defeated Édouard Roger-Vasselin, then lost to Andy Murray in the second round. Janowicz ended the season at the Paris Masters, where he lost a three-set match against Sam Querrey. He ended the season ranked No. 43, finishing with a top-50 ranking for the third time in succession.

=== 2015: Hopman Cup title ===
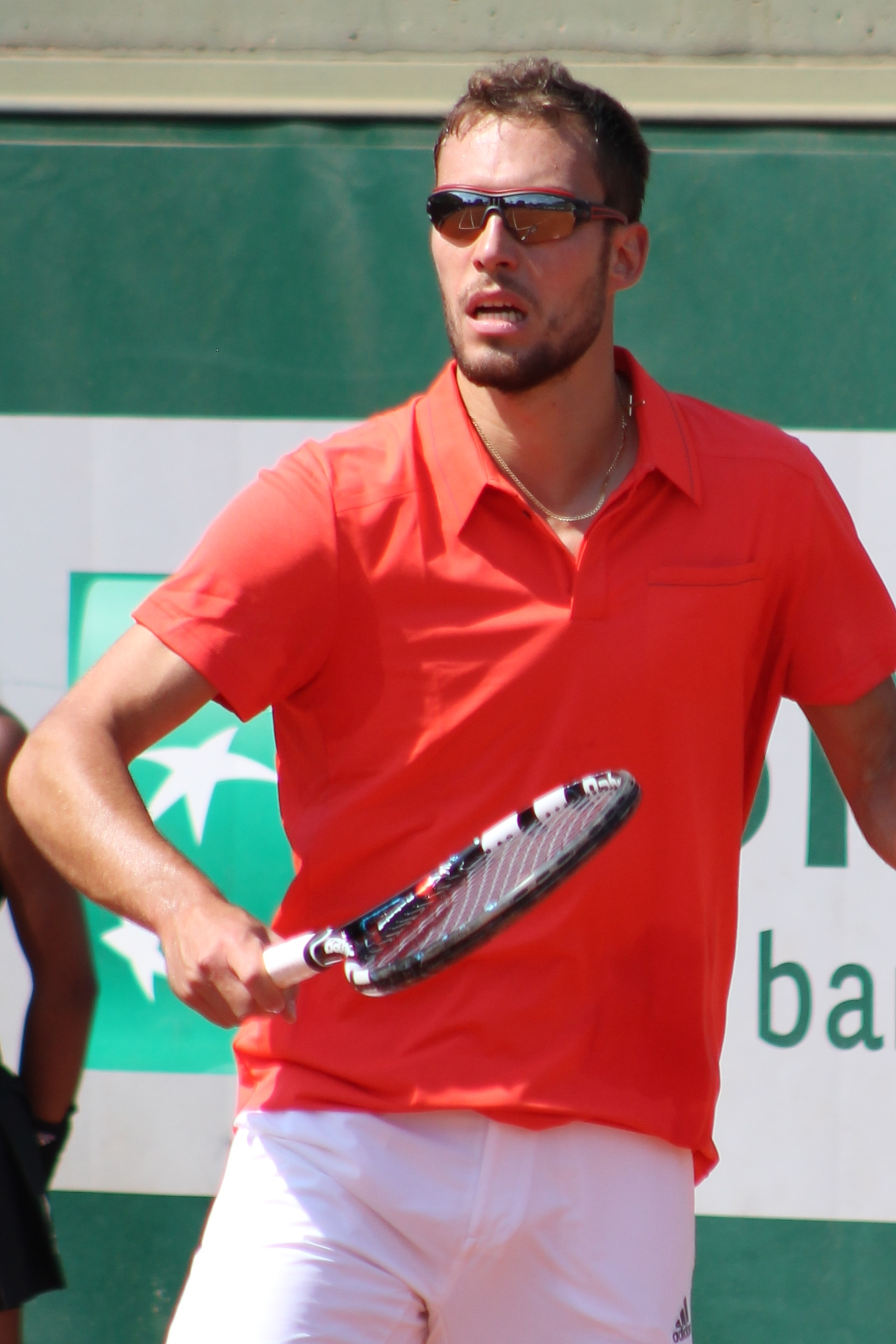
Janowicz at the 2015 French Open

Janowicz started 2015 season by teaming up with Agnieszka Radwańska to win the Hopman Cup, Poland's first title in the event. Janowicz and Radwańska claimed their first Hopman Cup title after they beat the top-seeded USA team 2–1 in a final mixed doubles match over the Americans Serena Williams and John Isner. Janowicz continued at the Sydney International, where he defeated Nick Kyrgios, then lost to Leonardo Mayer in the second round. At the Australian Open Janowicz defeated Hiroki Moriya in his opening match, followed by a defeat of 17th-seeded Gaël Monfils in the second round, coming back from two sets to one down to make the third round for the third year in a row. In the third round, Janowicz lost to 12th seeded Feliciano López.

Janowicz continued at Open Sud de France in Montpellier where he defeated Dustin Brown, Benoît Paire, Gilles Simon and João Sousa to make his third ATP final. In the final against Richard Gasquet, Janowicz was forced to retire due to a viral infection.

At Indian Wells Masters, Janowicz was defeated by Diego Schwartzman in the first round. The following week Janowicz defeated Édouard Roger-Vasselin and Roberto Bautista Agut, then lost to David Goffin in the third round of the Miami Masters. After early losses at ATP tournaments in Monte Carlo, Madrid, and Rome Janowicz participated at Roland Garros. He defeated Maxime Hamou, then lost to Leonardo Mayer in the second round.

Janowicz started the grass season with the Stuttgart Open tournament, where he defeated Dustin Brown, then lost to Philipp Kohlschreiber in the second round. At Halle Open, Janowicz defeated Pablo Cuevas and Alejandro Falla to make his third ATP 500 quarterfinal against Kei Nishikori. After a three set battle, Janowicz lost to Nishikori. The following week he continued at Wimbledon, losing in the first round against Marsel İlhan in four sets.

At the Swedish Open, Janowicz defeated Andrea Arnaboldi, then lost to Steve Darcis in the second round. Janowicz continued at the German Open Tennis Championships in Hamburg where he defeated Taro Daniel, then lost to Pablo Cuevas in three sets. After a first round loss at Rogers Cup, Janowicz continued at Cincinnati Masters where he defeated Gaël Monfils and Jared Donaldson, then lost to Alexandr Dolgopolov in the third round. Following a first round loss at the US Open, Janowicz entered for the first time in his career St. Petersburg Open, where he defeated Benoît Paire, then lost to Lucas Pouille in the second round. Jerzy Janowicz ended the season ranked 57th.

=== 2016: Knee injury and Rio Summer Olympics ===
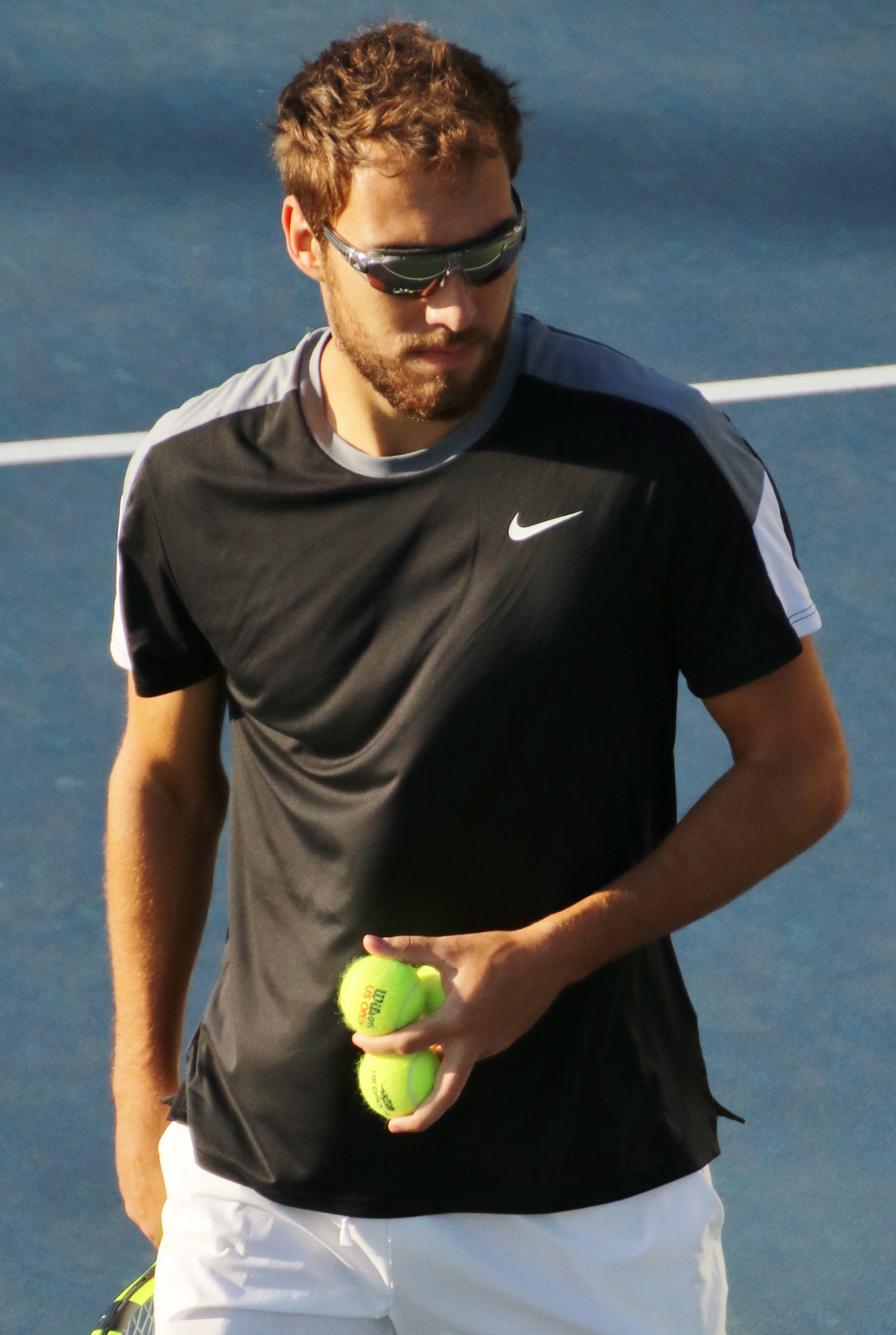
Jerzy Janowicz at the 2016 US Open

Jerzy Janowicz began his season at the Australian Open where he faced John Isner in the first round. He lost in straight sets. Subsequently, due to an ongoing struggle with a knee injury he was forced to withdraw from all of the tournaments in February.

In March, Janowicz was originally expected to play Poland's first Davis Cup World Group tie, but two days before the event he had to undergo tests on his injured knee. In the end, he was forced to miss the tie, and Poland lost to Argentina 3–2. Due to the injury, Janowicz missed both the Masters 1000 events in Indian Wells and Miami. The knee injury was another in a long line of injuries for Janowicz. A back injury initially stopped his climb toward the top of the tennis world in 2013. A foot injury followed in 2014. With the knee injury and unable to play during the first six months of the season, Janowicz managed to stay on the edge of the top 100 ATP ranking while maintaining his frozen ranking of No. 94.

In July Janowicz participated at the Open Castilla y León ATP Challenger Tournament in Segovia, Spain, where he lost to Luca Vanni in the first round. Following the match Janowicz stated: "I have been out for eight months and I haven't touched the racket for five months". He also added that he hoped of not injuring his knee again during the match.

In August, Janowicz competed at the 2016 Summer Olympics in Rio de Janeiro, Brazil, where he lost to Gilles Müller in the first round. Janowicz came back to the ATP tour starting with the US Open. In the opening match, he lost to Novak Djokovic, but managed to take a set off the defending champion before falling in a competitive match on Arthur Ashe Stadium. "It's never easy to play against Djokovic. It doesn't matter where or when or what shape I'm in", said Janowicz. "I was just trying to play my best tennis. I was actually a little bit unlucky because I had quite a few chances to take the first set."

Following US Open, Janowicz returned to the ATP Challenger Tour. He decided to primarily play in Challengers to gain match play and rebuild confidence in his game. "My rehab was long because I got injured during last year's US Open and then tried to play through it at the end of the season, which was quite stupid on my part", he said. "The doctors said it wouldn't be easy to come back and there was a chance I might not be able to, but I was still hoping to get better. Now, I'm just trying to get back in shape again." To improve his game Janowicz chose to compete at the Challenger event in Genova, Italy. Showing that his knee can withstand plenty of time on court, he prevailed in a long three-set match over Lorenzo Sonego. He then defeated No. 2 seed Horacio Zeballos, Gianluca Mager, Carlos Berlocq and Nicolás Almagro to win his first tournament of the season. Next Janowicz participated in the Pekao Szczecin Open Challenger tournament in his homeland Poland and then competed at the Open d'Orléans in France, where he was a finalist last year. He ended the season with the ATP Challenger tournament in Mons, Belgium, and year-end ranking of No. 280.

=== 2017: 100th match win ===
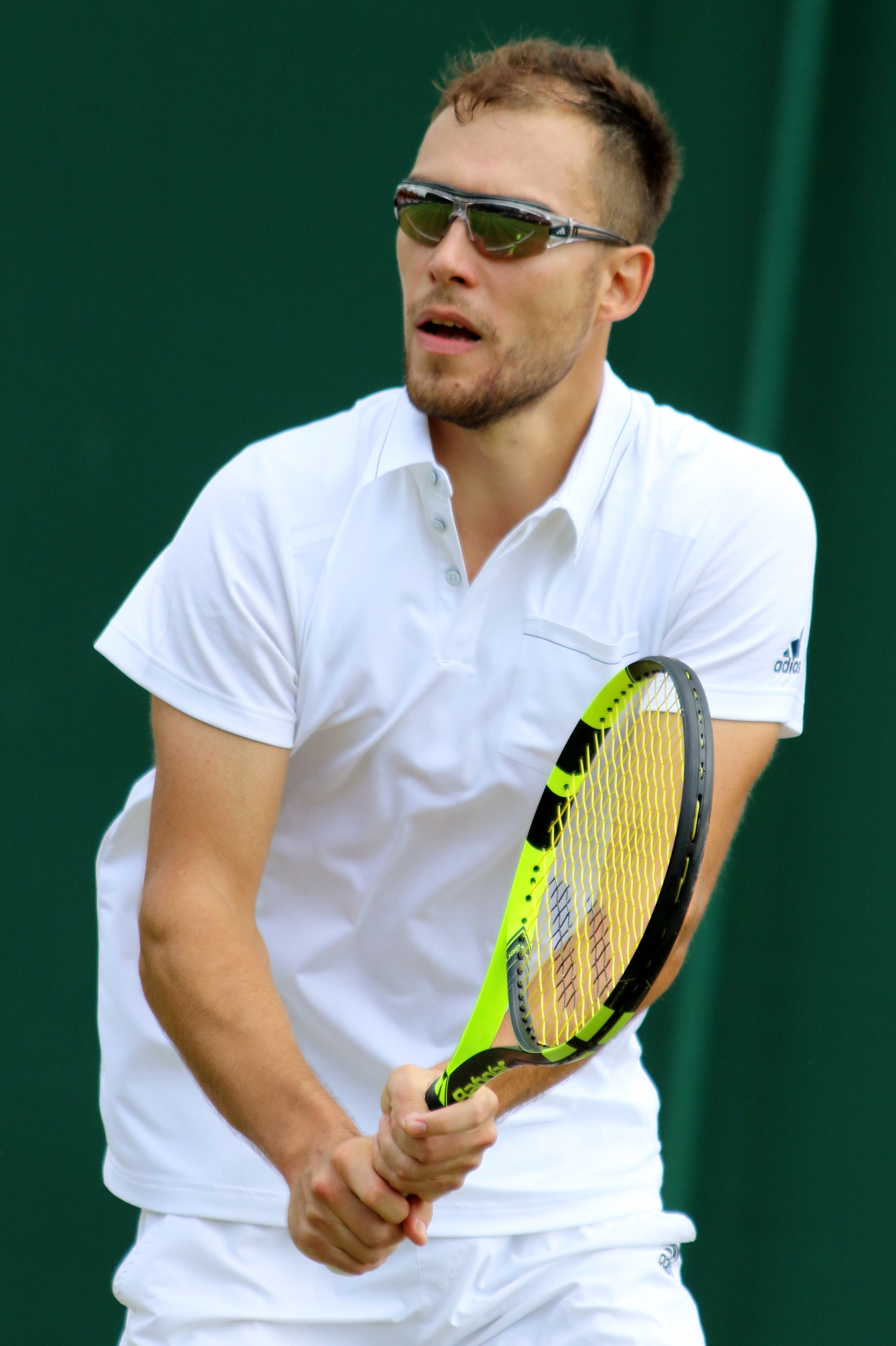
Janowicz at Wimbledon, 2017

At the start of the season Janowicz hired a new coach, former Austrian Davis Cup captain, Günter Bresnik.

Before the Australian Open, Janowicz participated at ATP Auckland Open in New Zealand. At the first Grand Slam of the year Janowicz faced seventh seed Marin Čilić in the first round. Both players produced an extraordinarily high level of tennis in the first two sets, with Janowicz hitting 23 winners and just nine unforced errors, while Cilic struck 27 winners and only 15 unforced errors. Janowicz required just a single break of serve late in each set to take a commanding two-set lead, but ultimately Cilic rallied from two sets down to prevail in five sets. Janowicz continued at Australian Open with his doubles partner Marcin Matkowski. The Polish team defeated Fabio Fognini and Fernando Verdasco but lost to the top-seeded French team of Pierre-Hugues Herbert and Nicolas Mahut in the second round. Following Australian Open Janowicz competed at the Open BNP Paribas Banque de Bretagne Challenger Tournament in France as a wild card. Next he played at the ATP Sofia Open, where he lost a tight three-set second-round match to the 2017 Australian Open semifinalist Grigor Dimitrov.

In February Janowicz claimed his sixth ATP Challenger career title at the Trofeo Faip–Perrel in Bergamo, Italy. Janowicz, who entered the main draw with a wild card, eased past Frenchman Quentin Halys in two sets. Janowicz continued at Wrocław Open, where he lost to Jürgen Melzer in the second round. He then participated at the Jalisco Open Challenger Tour event in Guadalajara, Mexico where he lost to Denis Shapovalov in the semifinal. Janowicz played his only clay-court World Tour tournament at the 2017 French Open, where he lost to Taro Daniel in the first round.

Janowicz began his grass-court season with a quarterfinal run at the Stuttgart Open. En route to the last eight, he defeated Andrey Kuznetsov and second seed Grigor Dimitrov. In the quarterfinals, he was defeated by Benoît Paire in straight sets. He continued with the Aegon International. At Wimbledon he defeated Denis Shapovalov and Lucas Pouille but lost to Benoît Paire in the third round.

In September, Janowicz reached the quarterfinals at the Pekao Szczecin Open, the oldest tennis tournament in Poland. He continued at Stockholm Open where he defeated Pierre-Hugues Herbert to face Grigor Dimitrov for the third time this season. Dimitrov drilled nine aces and did not drop serve defeating Janowicz in a tight two set match.

In November Janowicz competed at the Bauer Watertechnology Cup in Eckental, where he was seeded 7th. He defeated top seeded Ruben Bemelmans and Matthias Bachinger, then lost to Maximilian Marterer in the final. Next Janowicz made a winning start to Slovak Open, a Challenger event in Bratislava, defeating Norbert Gombos and Bernard Tomic, then lost to Mikhail Kukushkin in the quarterfinals. As a result, Janowicz ended the season ranked No. 122.

=== 2019: Knee surgery and back to training ===
Janowicz did not play since November 2017 due to knee injury. In April 2019, the doctors approved his return to training. Preparation began in Poland and Austria as he looked to return to competitive action. When he returned to playing on the tour Janowicz had a protected ranking of 123 in the world. He accepted a wildcard into the Sopot Open but later withdrew. According to TennisWorldUSA, he planned to return at the start of the 2020 season.

=== 2020: Return from knee surgery ===
At the start of the season Janowicz received a wild card to the 2020 Open de Rennes, returning to the tour for the first time since the Bratislava Open in November 2017. He spent the offseason in Tenerife with his coach Gunter Bresnik, working hard on his game and preparing for his long-awaited return. In February Janowicz reached the final at the Teréga Open Pau–Pyrénées in France. In the semifinal he defeated top seed Jiří Veselý before falling to Ernests Gulbis in the final.

=== 2021: Single exhibition match ===
He played a single match in 2021. In the friendly exhibition match in Zielona Góra, Poland between Poland and Czechia, he beat Jiří Lehečka 3–6, 6–3, [10–8].

=== 2022: Comeback ===
In May Janowicz received a wildcard to the 2022 Poznań Open Challenger tournament in Poland.

=== Davis Cup ===
In 2009, Janowicz played a major role in Poland's 3–2 Davis Cup win over Great Britain at Liverpool's Echo Arena. Janowicz defeated Daniel Evans but lost to world No. 4 Andy Murray. In 2013 Jerzy Janowicz won the decisive fourth rubber for Poland with Slovenia to secure a Europe/Africa Zone Group I second-round tie against South Africa. Janowicz fended off early resistance to defeat Grega Žemlja in straight sets at Centennial Hall in Wrocław. Earlier Janowicz won with Blaž Kavčič, with the final tie result at 3–2 to Poland.

== Playing style ==
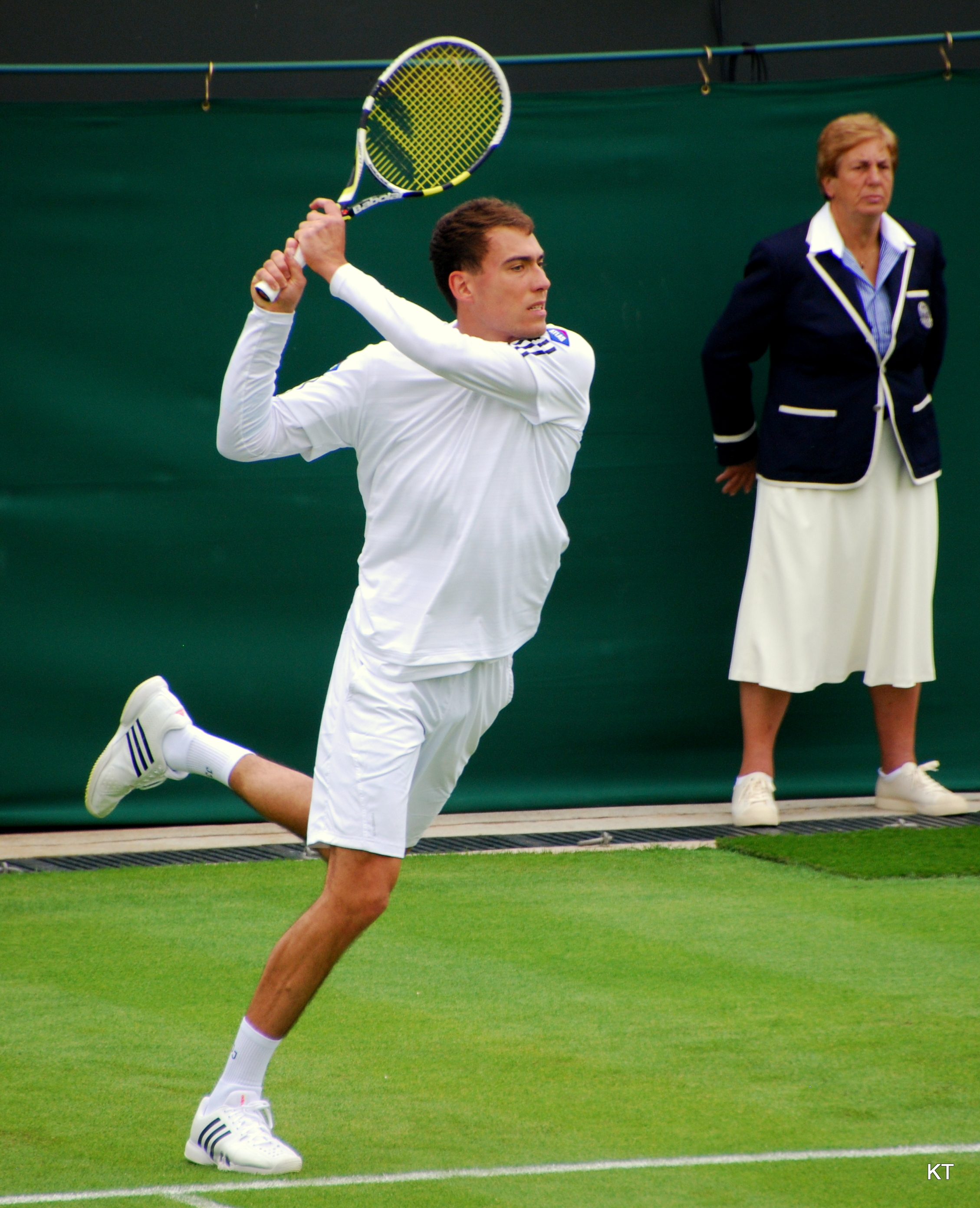
Jerzy Janowicz is known for his powerful groundstrokes

Janowicz possesses one of the hardest serves in the world, hitting a first serve generally between 130 and 140 mph and often hitting a second serve from 115 to 120 mph. His ball toss is extremely high, even for a man who is 6 feet 8, producing a high trajectory. Janowicz also moves remarkably well considering how big he is, and hits powerful groundstrokes from the back of the court and has an excellent drop shot. He has a double-handed backhand, and is known to hit hard and constantly mix up his game by hitting numerous drop shots, slices and spins.

== ATP 1000 tournaments finals ==
=== Singles: 1 (runner-up) ===
Result	Year	Tournament	Surface	Opponent	Score
Loss	2012	Paris Masters	Hard (i)	(Spain) David Ferrer	4–6, 3–6

=== Doubles: 1 (runner-up) ===
Result	Year	Tournament	Surface	Partner	Opponents	Score
Loss	2013	BNP Paribas Open	Hard	(Philippines) Treat Huey	(United States) Bob Bryan (United States) Mike Bryan	3–6, 6–3, [6–10]

== ATP Tour finals ==
=== Singles: 3 (3 runner-ups) ===
Legend Grand Slam (0–0) ATP Finals (0–0) ATP 1000 (0–1) ATP 500 / International Gold (0–0) ATP 250 / International (0–2)	Finals by surface Hard (0–3) Clay (0–0) Grass (0–0)	Finals by setting Outdoor (0–1) Indoor (0–2)

Result	W–L	Date	Tournament	Tier	Surface	Opponent	Score
Loss	0–1	Nov 2012	Paris Masters, France	ATP 1000	Hard (i)	(Spain) David Ferrer	4–6, 3–6
Loss	0–2	Aug 2014	Winston-Salem Open, US	ATP 250	Hard	(Czech Republic) Lukáš Rosol	6–3, 6–7^{(3–7)}, 5–7
Loss	0–3	Feb 2015	Open Sud de France, France	ATP 250	Hard (i)	(France) Richard Gasquet	0–3 ret.

=== Doubles: 1 (runner-up) ===
Legend Grand Slam (0–0) ATP Finals (0–0) ATP 1000 (0–1) ATP 500 (0–0) ATP 250 (0–0)	Finals by surface Hard (0–1) Clay (0–0) Grass (0–0)	Finals by setting Outdoor (0–1) Indoor (0–0)

Result	W–L	Date	Tournament	Tier	Surface	Partner	Opponents	Score
Loss	0–1	Mar 2013	BNP Paribas Open, US	ATP 1000	Hard	(Philippines) Treat Conrad Huey	(United States) Bob Bryan (United States) Mike Bryan	3–6, 6–3, [6–10]

== National and international representation ==
=== Team competition ===
==== Hopman Cup: 1 (title) ====
Result	W–L	Date	Team competition	Surface	Partner/Team	Opponents	Score
Win	1–0	Jan 2015	Hopman Cup, Perth	Hard	(Poland) Agnieszka Radwańska	(United States) Serena Williams (United States) John Isner	2–1

== ATP Challenger Tour and ITF Futures finals ==
=== Singles: 23 (13 titles, 10 runner-ups) ===
Legend ATP Challenger Tour (6–6) ITF Futures (7–4)	Finals by surface Hard (4–5) Clay (8–3) Carpet (1–2)

Result	W–L	Date	Tournament	Tier	Surface	Opponent	Score
Win	1–0	Mar 2008	Liechtenstein F3, Vaduz	Futures	Carpet	(Italy) Andrea Stoppini	7–6^{(7–4)}, 6–4
Win	2–0	Aug 2008	Poland F5, Olsztyn	Futures	Clay	(Poland) Marcin Gawron	6–4, 6–2
Win	3–0	Sep 2008	Poland F7, Wrocław	Futures	Clay	(Poland) Marcin Gawron	7–6^{(7–3)}, 6–2
Loss	3–1	May 2009	Czech Republic F1, Teplice	Futures	Clay	(Czech Republic) Michal Tabara	3–6, 2–6
Win	4–1	May 2009	Czech Republic F2, Most	Futures	Clay	(Czech Republic) Michal Tabara	6–4, 2–6, 7–6^{(7–3)}
Win	5–1	Feb 2010	Azerbaijan F2, Baku	Futures	Hard	(Russia) Mikhail Ledovskikh	6–4, 7–6^{(7–3)}
Win	6–1	Jun 2010	Poland F3, Koszalin	Futures	Clay	(Chile) Adrián García	6–7^{(2–7)}, 6–3, 6–3
Loss	6–2	Jun 2010	Poland F4, Gilwice	Futures	Clay	(Czech Republic) Dušan Lojda	6–7^{(3–7)}, 6–7^{(4–7)}
Win	1–0	Sep 2010	Trophée des Alpilles, France	Challenger	Hard (i)	(France) Édouard Roger-Vasselin	3–6, 7–6^{(10–8)}, 7–6^{(8–6)}
Win	7–2	Oct 2010	Belarus F3, Minsk	Futures	Hard (i)	(Belarus) Aliaksandr Bury	7–6^{(8–6)}, 6–3
Loss	7–3	Oct 2010	Belarus F4, Minsk	Futures	Hard (i)	(Belarus) Sergey Betov	6–4, 6–7^{(6–8)}, 7–6^{(7–3)}
Loss	1–1	Nov 2010	Salzburg Indoors, Austria	Challenger	Hard (i)	(Republic of Ireland) Conor Niland	6–7^{(5–7)}, 7–6^{(7–2)}, 3–6
Loss	1–2	Jul 2011	Poznań Open, Poland	Challenger	Clay	(Portugal) Rui Machado	3–6, 3–6
Loss	7–4	Jan 2012	Great Britain F3, Birkenhead	Futures	Hard	(Belgium) Yannick Mertens	6–7^{(5–7)}, 6–2, 2–6
Loss	1–3	Feb 2012	Wolfsburg Challenger, Germany	Challenger	Carpet	(Netherlands) Igor Sijsling	6–4, 3–6, 6–7^{(9-11)}
Win	2–3	May 2012	Roma Open, Italy	Challenger	Clay	(Luxembourg) Gilles Müller	7–6^{(7–3)}, 6–3
Win	3–3	Jul 2012	The Hague Open, Netherlands	Challenger	Clay	(Netherlands) Matwé Middelkoop	6–2, 6–2
Win	4–3	Jul 2012	Poznań Open, Poland	Challenger	Clay	(France) Jonathan Dasnières de Veigy	6–3, 6–3
Loss	4–4	Oct 2015	Open d'Orléans, France	Challenger	Hard	(Germany) Jan-Lennard Struff	7–5, 4–6, 3–6
Win	5–4	Sep 2016	AON Open Challenger, Italy	Challenger	Clay	(Spain) Nicolás Almagro	7–6^{(7–5)}, 6–4
Win	6–4	Feb 2017	Trofeo Faip–Perrel, Italy	Challenger	Hard (i)	(France) Quentin Halys	6–4, 6–4
Loss	6–5	Nov 2017	Eckental Bauer Cup, Germany	Challenger	Carpet	(Germany) Maximilian Marterer	6–7^{(8–10)}, 6–3, 3–6
Loss	6–6	Mar 2020	Open Pau–Pyrénées, France	Challenger	Hard (i)	(Latvia) Ernests Gulbis	3–6, 4–6

=== Doubles: 4 (4 titles) ===
Legend ATP Challenger Tour (2–0) ITF Futures (2–0)	Finals by surface Hard (1–0) Clay (3–0)

Result	W–L	Date	Tournament	Tier	Surface	Partner	Opponents	Score
Win	1–0	Aug 2008	Poland F5, Olsztyn	Futures	Clay	(Poland) Mateusz Kowalczyk	(Poland) Andrzej Grusiecki (Poland) Andriej Kapaś	6–1, 6–4
Win	2–0	May 2009	Poland F1, Katowice	Futures	Clay	(Poland) Mateusz Kowalczyk	(Russia) Denis Matsukevich (Russia) Valery Rudnev	6–3, 6–3
Win	1–0	May 2012	Tunis Open, Tunisia	Challenger	Clay	(Estonia) Jürgen Zopp	(United States) Nicholas Monroe (Germany) Simon Stadler	7–6^{(7–1)}, 6–3
Win	2–0	Oct 2012	Mons Ethias Trophy, Belgium	Challenger	Hard	(Poland) Tomasz Bednarek	(France) Michaël Llodra (France) Édouard Roger-Vasselin	7–5, 4–6, [10–2]

== Performance timelines ==
Key
W	F	SF	QF	#R	RR	Q#	P#	DNQ	A	Z#	PO	G	S	B	NMS	NTI	P	NH

(W) winner; (F) finalist; (SF) semifinalist; (QF) quarterfinalist; (#R) rounds 4, 3, 2, 1; (RR) round-robin stage; (Q#) qualification round; (P#) preliminary round; (DNQ) did not qualify; (A) absent; (Z#) Davis/Fed Cup Zonal Group (with number indication) or (PO) play-off; (G) gold, (S) silver or (B) bronze Olympic/Paralympic medal; (NMS) not a Masters tournament; (NTI) not a Tier I tournament; (P) postponed; (NH) not held; (SR) strike rate (events won / competed); (W–L) win–loss record.
To avoid confusion and double counting, these charts are updated at the conclusion of a tournament or when the player's participation has ended.

=== Singles ===
Current through 2021 Australian Open.

Tournament	2008	2009	2010	2011	2012	2013	2014	2015	2016	2017	2018–19	2020	2021	SR	W–L	Win %
Grand Slam tournaments
Australian Open	A	A	A	Q2	A	3R	3R	3R	1R	1R	A	A	A	0 / 5	6–5	55%
French Open	A	A	A	Q2	Q3	3R	3R	2R	A	1R	A	A	A	0 / 4	5–4	56%
Wimbledon	A	A	A	Q3	3R	SF	3R	1R	A	3R	A	NH	A	0 / 5	11–5	69%
US Open	A	Q3	Q2	Q1	1R	1R	2R	1R	1R	A	A	A	A	0 / 5	1–5	17%
Win–loss	0–0	0–0	0–0	0–0	2–2	9–4	7–4	3–4	0–2	2–3	0–0	0–0	0–0	0 / 19	23–19	55%
ATP World Tour Masters 1000
Indian Wells Masters	A	A	A	A	A	3R	2R	1R	A	A	A	NH	A	0 / 3	1–3	25%
Miami Masters	A	A	A	A	A	2R	2R	3R	A	A	A	NH	A	0 / 3	2–3	40%
Monte-Carlo Masters	A	A	A	A	A	1R	1R	1R	A	A	A	NH	A	0 / 3	0–3	0%
Madrid Masters	A	A	A	A	A	2R	1R	1R	A	Q1	A	NH	A	0 / 3	1–3	25%
Rome Masters	A	A	A	A	A	QF	1R	1R	A	A	A	A	A	0 / 3	3–3	50%
Canada Masters	A	A	A	A	A	3R	1R	1R	A	A	A	NH	A	0 / 3	2–3	40%
Cincinnati Masters	A	A	A	A	Q2	1R	3R	3R	A	A	A	A	A	0 / 3	4–3	57%
Shanghai Masters	A	A	A	A	A	A	2R	A	A	A	A	NH	A	0 / 1	1–1	50%
Paris Masters	A	A	A	A	F	3R	1R	Q2	A	A	A	A	A	0 / 3	6–3	67%
Win–loss	0–0	0–0	0–0	0–0	5–1	8–8	3–9	4–7	0–0	0–0	0–0	0–0	0–0	0 / 25	20–25	44%
National representation
Summer Olympics	A	Not Held			A	Not Held			1R	Not Held			A	0 / 1	0–1	0%
Davis Cup	Z1	Z1	Z1	Z1	Z2	WG	Z1	WG2	A	A	A	WG2	A	0 / 0	22–10	69%
Career statistics
Tournaments	1	2	2	1	4	20	24	22	3	3	0	0	0	82		
Titles / Finals	0–0	0–0	0–0	0–0	0–1	0–0	0–1	0–1	0–0	0–0	0–0	0–0	0–0	0–3		
Overall win–loss	1–2	2–4	1–3	2–3	14–4	27–20	24–26	24–24	0–3	6–6	0–0	1–0	0–0	102–95		
Win %	33%	33%	25%	40%	78%	57%	48%	50%	0%	50%	–	100%	–	52%		
Year-end ranking	339	319	161	221	26	21	43	57	280	123	–	503	507			

=== Doubles ===
Tournament	2012	2013	2014	2015	2016	2017	...	SR	W–L	Win %
Grand Slam tournaments
Australian Open	A	2R	A	A	2R	2R	A	0 / 3	3–3	50%
French Open	A	QF	A	1R	A	A	A	0 / 2	3–2	60%
Wimbledon	Q1	A	A	A	A	A	A	0 / 0	0–0	–
US Open	A	1R	A	1R	A	A	A	0 / 2	0–2	0%
Win–loss	0–0	4–3	0–0	0–2	1–1	1–1	0–0	0 / 7	6–7	46%
National representation
Summer Olympics	A	Not Held			A	Not Held		0 / 0	0–0	0%
ATP World Tour Masters 1000
Indian Wells Masters	A	F	1R	A	A	A	A	0 / 2	4–2	67%
Miami Masters	A	1R	A	A	A	A	A	0 / 1	0–1	0%
Monte-Carlo Masters	A	1R	A	A	A	A	A	0 / 1	0–1	0%
Canada Masters	A	2R	A	A	A	A	A	0 / 1	1–1	50%
Cincinnati Masters	A	2R	A	A	A	A	A	0 / 1	1–1	50%
Win–loss	0–0	6–5	0–1	0–0	0–0	0–0	0–0	0 / 6	6–6	50%
Career statistics
Titles–Finals	0–0	0–1	0–0	0–0	0–0	0–0	0–0	0–1		
Overall win–loss	0–0	13–13	0–2	0–3	1–1	1–1	0–0	15–20		
Year-end ranking	268	52	–	–	574	452	–	43%		

== Junior Grand Slam finals ==
=== Singles: 2 (2 runner-ups) ===
Result	No.	Date	Tournament	Surface	Opponent	Score
Loss	1.	Sep 2007	US Open	Hard	(Lithuania) Ričardas Berankis	3–6, 4–6
Loss	2.	Jun 2008	French Open	Clay	(Chinese Taipei) Yang Tsung-hua	3–6, 6–7^{(5–7)}

== ITF junior results ==
=== Singles: 7 (3–4) ===
Legend
Grand Slam (0–2)
Grade A (0–0)
Grade B (0–0)
Grade (3–2)

Result	No.	Date	Location	Surface	Opponent	Score
Win	1.	Nov 2006	Riyadh, Saudi Arabia	Hard	(United States) David Nguyen	6–4, 6–3
Loss	1.	Nov 2006	Riyadh, Saudi Arabia	Hard	(Portugal) Martin Trueva	6–3, 3–6, 5–7
Win	2.	Jan 2007	New Delhi, India	Hard	(Thailand) Kittiphong Wachiramanowong	3–6, 6–4, 6–3
Win	3.	May 2007	Sankt Pölten, Austria	Clay	(Australia) Mark Verryth	6–2, 6–1
Loss	2.	Jul 2007	Essen, Germany	Clay	(Mexico) César Ramírez	6–4, 1–6, 1–2 ret.
Loss	3.	Sep 2007	US Open, New York	Hard	(Lithuania) Ričardas Berankis	3–6, 4–6
Loss	4.	Jun 2008	French Open, Paris	Clay	(Chinese Taipei) Yang Tsung-hua	3–6, 6–7^{(5–7)}

=== Doubles: 1 (title) ===
Legend
Grand Slam (0–0)
Grade A (0–0)
Grade B (0–0)
Grade (1–0)

Result	No.	Date	Location	Surface	Partner	Opponents	Score
Win	1.	Jun 2007	Halle, Germany	Grass	(Poland) Mateusz Szmigiel	(Ecuador) Patricio Alvarado (Czech Republic) Jiri Kosler	walkover

== Record against other top players ==
=== Head-to-head vs. players who reached the top 10 in their careers ===
Player	Ranking	Record	W%	Hardcourt	Clay	Grass	Carpet	Last match
(Australia) Lleyton Hewitt	1	1–0	100%	0–0	0–0	1–0	0–0	Win (7–5, 6–4, 6–7^{(7–9)}, 4–6, 6–3) at 2014 Wimbledon Championships
(United Kingdom) Andy Murray	1	1–4	20%	1–3	0–0	0–1	0–0	Loss (5–7, 2–6) at 2014 Shanghai Masters
(Serbia) Novak Djokovic	1	0–1	0%	0–1	0–0	0–0	0–0	Loss (3–6, 7–5, 2–6, 1–6) at 2016 US Open
(Switzerland) Roger Federer	1	0–1	0%	0–0	0–1	0–0	0–0	Loss (4–6, 6–7^{(2–7)}) at 2013 Rome
(Spain) Rafael Nadal	1	0–2	0%	0–2	0–0	0–0	0–0	Loss (5–7, 4–6) at 2013 Paris Masters
(Germany) Tommy Haas	2	1–0	100%	1–0	0–0	0–0	0–0	Win (6–4, 6–4) at 2014 Rotterdam
(Argentina) David Nalbandian	3	1–0	100%	1–0	0–0	0–0	0–0	Win (7–6^{(7–4)}, 4–6, 6–3) at 2013 Indian Wells
(Switzerland) Stanislas Wawrinka	3	0–1	0%	0–0	0–1	0–0	0–0	Loss (3–6, 7–6^{(7–2)}, 3–6, 3–6) at 2013 French Open
(Spain) David Ferrer	3	0–2	0%	0–2	0–0	0–0	0–0	Loss (4–6, 6–4, 0–6) at 2013 Valencia
(United States) James Blake	4	0–1	0%	0–1	0–0	0–0	0–0	Loss (1–6, 5–7) at 2013 Cincinnati
(France) Jo-Wilfried Tsonga	5	1–1	50%	0–0	1–1	0–0	0–0	Loss (4–6, 4–6, 3–6) at 2014 French Open
(Czech Republic) Tomáš Berdych	5	0–3	0%	0–2	0–1	0–0	0–0	Loss (7–6^{(11–9)}, 2–6, 4–6) at 2014 Rotterdam
(France) Gilles Simon	6	1–0	100%	1–0	0–0	0–0	0–0	Win (6–4, 7–5) at 2012 Paris Masters
(France) Richard Gasquet	7	1–3	25%	0–3	1–0	0–0	0–0	Loss (0–3 ret.) at 2015 Montpellier
(Spain) Fernando Verdasco	7	0–1	0%	0–0	0–1	0–0	0–0	Loss (5–7, 0–4 ret.) at 2013 Hamburg
(Bulgaria) Grigor Dimitrov	8	2–3	40%	1–0	0–1	0–0	0–0	Loss (5–7, 6–7^{(5–7)}) at 2017 Stockholm
(Czech Republic) Radek Štěpánek	8	1–0	100%	0–0	0–0	1–0	0–0	Win (6–2, 5–3 ret.) at 2013 Wimbledon Championships
(Serbia) Janko Tipsarević	8	1–0	100%	1–0	0–0	0–0	0–0	Win (3–6, 6–1, 4–1 ret.) at 2012 Paris Masters
(Austria) Jürgen Melzer	8	1–1	50%	0–0	0–1	1–0	0–0	Loss (4–6, 6–7^{(1–7)}) at 2014 Barcelona
(Croatia) Marin Čilić	8	1–2	33%	1–2	0–0	0–0	0–0	Loss (6–4, 6–4, 2–6, 2–6, 3–6) at 2017 Australian Open
(United States) John Isner	8	0–1	0%	0–1	0–0	0–0	0–0	Loss (3–6, 6–7^{(7–9)}, 3–6) at 2016 Australian Open
(Spain) Nicolás Almagro	9	1–1	50%	0–1	0–0	1–0	0–0	Win (7–6^{(8–6)}, 6–3, 6–4) at 2013 Wimbledon Championships
(Latvia) Ernests Gulbis	10	2–4	33%	0–3	1–1	1–0	0–0	Loss (3–6, 4–6) at 2020 Pau Challenger

=== Wins over top-10 players ===
- Janowicz' match record against players who were, at the time the match was played, ranked in the top 10.

#	Player	Ranking	Event	Surface	Round	Score	JJR
2012
1.	(United Kingdom) Andy Murray	3	Paris Masters, France	Hard (i)	3R	5–7, 7–6^{(7–4)}, 6–2	69
2.	(Serbia) Janko Tipsarević	9	Paris Masters, France	Hard (i)	QF	3–6, 6–1, 4–1 ret.	69
2013
3.	(France) Jo-Wilfried Tsonga	8	Italian Open, Italy	Clay	2R	6–4, 7–6^{(7–5)}	24
4.	(France) Richard Gasquet	9	Italian Open, Italy	Clay	3R	3–6, 7–6^{(7–2)}, 6–4	24
2014
5.	(Bulgaria) Grigor Dimitrov	8	Cincinnati Open, United States	Hard	2R	6–4, 3–6, 6–3	65

== Personal life ==
Since 2013 he is dating fellow Polish tennis player, Marta Domachowska. On 24 December 2018 they announced her pregnancy via Instagram and in 2019 their son was born.
