= 2012 Open Sud de France =

- Date: 28 January – 5 February 2012
- Edition: 25th
- Category: World Tour 250
- Draw: 28S / 16D
- Prize money: €398,250
- Surface: Hard / indoor
- Location: Montpellier, France
- Venue: Arena Montpellier

Champions

Singles
- (Czech Republic) Tomáš Berdych

Doubles
- (France) Nicolas Mahut / (France) Édouard Roger-Vasselin
← 2010 ·	Open Sud de France	· 2013 →

The 2012 Open Sud de France was a men's tennis tournament played on indoor hard courts. It was the 25th edition of the Open Sud de France, and was part of the ATP World Tour 250 Series of the 2012 ATP World Tour. It took place at the Arena Montpellier in Montpellier, France, from 28 January to 5 February 2012. It was the first edition to be held in January and the second held in Montpellier.

== Finals ==
=== Singles ===
(Czech Republic) Tomáš Berdych defeated (France) Gaël Monfils, 6–2, 4–6, 6–3

- It was Berdych's 1st title of the year and 7th of his career.

=== Doubles ===
(France) Nicolas Mahut / (France) Édouard Roger-Vasselin defeated (Australia) Paul Hanley / (United Kingdom) Jamie Murray, 6–4, 7–6^{(7–4)}

== Singles main-draw entrants ==
=== Seeds ===
Country	Player	Rank	Seed
CZE	Tomáš Berdych	7	1
FRA	Gilles Simon	14	2
FRA	Gaël Monfils	15	3
FRA	Richard Gasquet	18	4
ESP	Feliciano López	19	5
GER	Florian Mayer	21	6
GER	Philipp Kohlschreiber	41	7
FIN	Jarkko Nieminen	49	8

- Rankings as of January 16, 2012

=== Other entrants ===
The following players received wildcards into the singles main draw:

- (Russia) Nikolay Davydenko
- (France) Paul-Henri Mathieu
- (France) Guillaume Rufin

The following players received entry from the qualifying draw:

- (Spain) Roberto Bautista Agut
- (France) Marc Gicquel
- (France) Florent Serra
- (France) Maxime Teixeira

== Doubles main-draw entrants ==
=== Seeds ===
Country	Player	Country	Player	Rank^{1}	Seed
GBR	Colin Fleming	GBR	Ross Hutchins	70	1
CZE	František Čermák	CZE	Lukáš Dlouhý	78	2
AUS	Paul Hanley	GBR	Jamie Murray	84	3
GER	Philipp Marx	CAN	Adil Shamasdin	130	4

- Rankings are as of January 16, 2012

=== Other entrants ===
The following pairs received wildcards into the doubles main draw:

- (France) Kenny de Schepper / (France) Fabrice Martin
- (France) Gaël Monfils / (France) Daryl Monfils

The following pair received entry as alternates:

- (Russia) Nikolay Davydenko / (Russia) Igor Kunitsyn

=== Withdrawals ===
- (Spain) Feliciano López (injury)
