= 2010 Open Sud de France – Doubles =

Doubles
- 2010 Open Sud de France

Final
- Champions: (Australia) Stephen Huss; (United Kingdom) Ross Hutchins
- Runners-up: (Spain) Marc López; (Argentina) Eduardo Schwank
- Score: 6–2, 4–6, [10–7]

Details
- Draw: 16
- Seeds: 4

Events
Singles	Doubles
← 2009 ·	Open Sud de France	· 2012 →

Julien Benneteau and Nicolas Mahut were the defending champions, however Benneteau was injured (left wrist).
As a result, Mahut competed with Arnaud Clément. They were eliminated by Gaël Monfils and Josselin Ouanna in the first round.
Stephen Huss and Ross Hutchins won the tournament after defeating Marc López and Eduardo Schwank 6–2, 4–6, [10–7] in the final.

== Seeds ==
1. (India) Mahesh Bhupathi / (Belarus) Max Mirnyi (quarterfinals)
2. (Sweden) Robert Lindstedt / (Romania) Horia Tecău (first round)
3. (South Africa) Wesley Moodie / (Belgium) Dick Norman (quarterfinals)
4. (Spain) Marc López / (Argentina) Eduardo Schwank (final)

== Draw ==
=== Key ===
- Q = Qualifier
- WC = Wild card
- LL = Lucky loser
- Alt = Alternate
- SE = Special exempt
- PR = Protected ranking
- ITF = ITF entry
- JE = Junior exempt
- w/o = Walkover
- r = Retired
- d = Defaulted
- SR = Special ranking

=== Draw ===
First round

Quarterfinals

Semifinals

Final

1
- (India) M Bhupathi
- (Belarus) M Mirnyi
7^{7}
7^{7}

- (United States) T Rettenmaier
- (Serbia) D Vemić
6^{3}
6^{3}

1
- (India) M Bhupathi
- (Belarus) M Mirnyi
6
3
[12]

- (France) É Roger-Vasselin
- (France) G Simon
1
2

- (Australia) S Huss
- (United Kingdom) R Hutchins
3
6
[14]

- (Australia) S Huss
- (United Kingdom) R Hutchins
6
6

- (Australia) S Huss
- (United Kingdom) R Hutchins
6
6

3
- (South Africa) W Moodie
- (Belgium) D Norman
4
6
[10]

WC
- (France) G Monfils
- (France) J Ouanna
3
4

- (Spain) M Granollers
- (Spain) A Montañés
6
1
[4]

3
- (South Africa) W Moodie
- (Belgium) D Norman
4
4

- (France) A Clément
- (France) N Mahut
2
6^{5}

WC
- (France) G Monfils
- (France) J Ouanna
6
6

WC
- (France) G Monfils
- (France) J Ouanna
6
7^{7}

- (Australia) S Huss
- (United Kingdom) R Hutchins
6
4
[10]

WC
- (France) A Mannarino
- (France) B Paire
6^{8}
3

4
- (Spain) M López
- (Argentina) E Schwank
2
6
[7]

- (United States) E Butorac
- (Curaçao) J-J Rojer
7^{10}
6

- (United States) E Butorac
- (Curaçao) J-J Rojer
4
6
[9]

- (Israel) J Erlich
- (Australia) J Kerr
4
7^{7}
[6]

4
- (Spain) M López
- (Argentina) E Schwank
6
3
[11]

4
- (Spain) M López
- (Argentina) E Schwank
6
6^{5}
[10]

4
- (Spain) M López
- (Argentina) E Schwank
7^{7}
3
[10]

- (Sweden) J Brunström
- (Netherlands) R Haase
3
4

- (Jamaica) D Brown
- (Netherlands) R Wassen
6^{2}
6
[2]

- (Jamaica) D Brown
- (Netherlands) R Wassen
6
6

- (Jamaica) D Brown
- (Netherlands) R Wassen
4
6
[10]

- (Thailand) Sa Ratiwatana
- (Thailand) So Ratiwatana
7^{7}
7^{7}

- (Thailand) Sa Ratiwatana
- (Thailand) So Ratiwatana
6
3
[8]

2
- (Sweden) R Lindstedt
- (Romania) H Tecău
6^{5}
6^{4}
