= 2010 Open Sud de France – Singles =

Singles
- 2010 Open Sud de France

Final
- Champion: (France) Gaël Monfils
- Runner-up: (Croatia) Ivan Ljubičić
- Score: 6–2, 5–7, 6–1

Details
- Draw: 28
- Seeds: 8

Events
Singles	Doubles
- Open Sud de France

Ivan Ljubičić was the defending champion but lost in the final against Gaël Monfils, 6–2, 5–7, 6–1.

== Seeds ==
The top four seeds received a bye into the second round.

1. (Russia) Nikolay Davydenko (quarterfinals)
2. (France) Jo-Wilfried Tsonga (semifinals)
3. (France) Gaël Monfils (champion)
4. (Croatia) Ivan Ljubičić (final)
5. (United States) John Isner (quarterfinals)
6. (Spain) Albert Montañés (semifinals)
7. (France) Richard Gasquet (second round)
8. (Argentina) David Nalbandian (second round)

== Draw ==
Key

- Q = Qualifier
- WC = Wild card
- LL = Lucky loser
- Alt = Alternate
- ITF = ITF entry
- PR = Protected ranking
- SR = Special ranking
- SE = Special exempt
- JE = Junior exempt
- JR = Junior Accelerator Programme entrant
- CO = College Accelerator Programme entrant
- NG = Next Gen Accelerator Program entrant
- w/o = Walkover
- r = Retired
- d = Defaulted

=== Finals ===
Semifinals
6	(Spain) Albert Montañés	3	6^{4}
4	(Croatia) Ivan Ljubičić	6	7^{7}
3	(France) Gaël Monfils	7^{7}	2	6
2	(France) Jo-Wilfried Tsonga	6^{2}	6	4

Final
4	(Croatia) Ivan Ljubičić	2	7	1
3	(France) Gaël Monfils	6	5	6

=== Top half ===
First round
Q	(Germany) M Zverev	7^{9}	7^{7}
(Netherlands) R Haase	6^{7}	6^{5}
(Belgium) O Rochus	3^{r}
(France) M Llodra	2
(France) A Clément	4	4
6	(Spain) A Montañés	6	6
Q	(France) R Jouan	7^{7}	3	4
(United States) T Dent	6^{5}	6	6
(France) F Serra	7^{7}	5	1
(Finland) J Nieminen	6^{4}	7	6
(Germany) J Reister	7^{10}	3	3
7	(France) R Gasquet	6^{8}	6	6

Second round
1	(Russia) N Davydenko	7	6
Q	(Germany) M Zverev	5	3
(France) M Llodra	4	6^{5}
6	(Spain) A Montañés	6	7^{7}
4	(Croatia) I Ljubičić	7	6
(United States) T Dent	5	4
(Finland) J Nieminen	4	7^{8}	6
7	(France) R Gasquet	6	6^{6}	2

Quarterfinals
1	(Russia) N Davydenko	6	6^{3}	6^{4}
6	(Spain) A Montañés	3	7^{7}	7^{7}
4	(Croatia) I Ljubičić	4	6	7^{8}
(Finland) J Nieminen	6	3	6^{6}

Semifinals
6	(Spain) A Montañés	3	6^{4}
4	(Croatia) I Ljubičić	6	7^{7}

=== Bottom half ===
First round
5	(United States) J Isner	7	6
WC	(France) B Paire	5	2
(Slovakia) L Lacko	3	7^{7}	4
Q	(France) A Mannarino	6	6^{4}	6
Q	(Belgium) S Darcis	6	7
(Argentina) E Schwank	2	5
8/WC	(Argentina) D Nalbandian	6	6
(Spain) M Granollers	4	4
WC	(France) N Mahut	4	4
(France) G Simon	6	6
(Portugal) F Gil	6	2	7
(France) É Roger-Vasselin	4	6	5

Second round
5	(United States) J Isner	7^{7}	6^{5}	6
Q	(France) A Mannarino	6^{5}	7^{7}	3
Q	(Belgium) S Darcis	4	4
3	(France) G Monfils	6	6
8/WC	(Argentina) D Nalbandian	6	6^{5}	5
(France) G Simon	3	7^{7}	7
(Portugal) F Gil	3	4
2	(France) J-W Tsonga	6	6

Quarterfinals
5	(United States) J Isner	6	4	4
3	(France) G Monfils	3	6	6
(France) G Simon	3	7^{7}	3
2	(France) J-W Tsonga	6	6^{0}	6

Semifinals
3	(France) G Monfils	7^{7}	2	6
2	(France) J-W Tsonga	6^{2}	6	4

== Qualifying ==
=== Seeds ===
1. (Germany) Mischa Zverev (qualified)
2. (Jamaica) Dustin Brown (second round)
3. (France) Adrian Mannarino (qualified)
4. (Belgium) Steve Darcis (qualified)
5. (France) Marc Gicquel (qualifying competition)
6. (Australia) Peter Luczak (qualifying competition)
7. (France) Josselin Ouanna (first round)
8. (Netherlands) Thomas Schoorel (qualifying competition)

=== Qualifiers ===
1. (Germany) Mischa Zverev
2. (France) Romain Jouan
3. (France) Adrian Mannarino
4. (Belgium) Steve Darcis

=== Draw ===
==== First qualifier ====
First round
1	(Germany) Mischa Zverev	6	7
(France) Florian Reynet	4	5
WC	(Hungary) Márton Fucsovics	6^{3}	3
(France) Augustin Gensse	7^{7}	6
(Lithuania) Laurynas Grigelis	4	7^{8}	4
(Portugal) João Sousa	6	6^{6}	6
(France) Dorian Descloix	6^{6}	3
6	(Australia) Peter Luczak	7^{8}	6

Second round
1	(Germany) Mischa Zverev	6	4	7^{7}
(France) Augustin Gensse	4	6	6^{4}
(Portugal) João Sousa	1	3
6	(Australia) Peter Luczak	6	6

Qualifying competition
1	(Germany) Mischa Zverev	6	6
6	(Australia) Peter Luczak	1	1

==== Second qualifier ====
First round
2	(Jamaica) Dustin Brown	6	6
(Spain) David Marrero	2	4
(Germany) Sami Reinwein	6	3	2
(France) Vincent Millot	3	6	6
(Italy) Andrea Agazzi	3	6	6
WC	(Russia) Dmitri Sitak	6	4	3
(France) Romain Jouan	7	3	6
7	(France) Josselin Ouanna	5	6	4

Second round
2	(Jamaica) Dustin Brown	5	3
(France) Vincent Millot	7	6
(Italy) Andrea Agazzi	3	4
(France) Romain Jouan	6	6

Qualifying competition
(France) Vincent Millot	7^{7}	2	4
(France) Romain Jouan	6^{4}	6	6

==== Third qualifier ====
First round
3	(France) Adrian Mannarino	6	6
(France) Frederic Jeanclaude	3	2
(Germany) Simon Stadler	6	6
(Serbia) Danilo Petrović	0	2
(Monaco) Benjamin Balleret	2	6^{8}
(France) Mathieu Rodrigues	6	7^{10}
(Spain) Adrián Menéndez Maceiras	6^{3}	7^{7}	3
8	(Netherlands) Thomas Schoorel	7^{7}	6^{1}	6

Second round
3	(France) Adrian Mannarino	6	6
(Germany) Simon Stadler	0	3
(France) Mathieu Rodrigues	7^{7}	5	6^{4}
8	(Netherlands) Thomas Schoorel	6^{2}	7	7^{7}

Qualifying competition
3	(France) Adrian Mannarino	6	6
8	(Netherlands) Thomas Schoorel	2	2

==== Fourth qualifier ====
First round
4	(Belgium) Steve Darcis	6	6
WC	(France) Julien Maes	3	0
(France) Olivier Charroin	1	3
(Andorra) Laurent Recouderc	6	6
(Canada) Frank Dancevic	2	3
(Belgium) David Goffin	6	6
(France) Fabrice Martin	2	3
5	(France) Marc Gicquel	6	6

Second round
4	(Belgium) Steve Darcis	7^{7}	6
(Andorra) Laurent Recouderc	6^{2}	3
(Belgium) David Goffin	3	4
5	(France) Marc Gicquel	6	6

Qualifying competition
4	(Belgium) Steve Darcis	7^{7}	6
5	(France) Marc Gicquel	6^{3}	4
