= 2012 Open Sud de France – Doubles =

Doubles
- 2012 Open Sud de France

Final
- Champions: (France) Nicolas Mahut (France) Édouard Roger-Vasselin
- Runners-up: (Australia) Paul Hanley (United Kingdom) Jamie Murray
- Score: 6–4, 7–6^{(7–4)}

Details
- Draw: 16
- Seeds: 4

Events
Singles	Doubles
← 2010 ·	Open Sud de France	· 2013 →

Stephen Huss and Ross Hutchins were the defending champions but decided not to participate. However Huss chose not to compete and Hutchins teamed up with Colin Fleming. The French pair formed by Nicolas Mahut and Édouard Roger-Vasselin beat in the final the 3rd seeded Paul Hanley and Jamie Murray with the score 6–4, 7–6^{(7–4)}.

== Seeds ==
1. (United Kingdom) Colin Fleming / (United Kingdom) Ross Hutchins (quarterfinals)
2. (Czech Republic) František Čermák / (Czech Republic) Lukáš Dlouhý (first round)
3. (Australia) Paul Hanley / (United Kingdom) Jamie Murray (final)
4. (Germany) Philipp Marx / (Canada) Adil Shamasdin (first round)

== Draw ==
=== Key ===
- Q = Qualifier
- WC = Wild card
- LL = Lucky loser
- Alt = Alternate
- SE = Special exempt
- PR = Protected ranking
- ITF = ITF entry
- JE = Junior exempt
- w/o = Walkover
- r = Retired
- d = Defaulted
- SR = Special ranking

=== Draw ===
First round
1	(United Kingdom) C Fleming (United Kingdom) R Hutchins	6	6
(Italy) S Bolelli (Spain) A Ramos	1	2
(France) N Mahut (France) É Roger-Vasselin	6	7
(France) A Mannarino (France) G Simon	3	5
4	(Germany) P Marx (Canada) A Shamasdin	6^{5}	1
(Philippines) TC Huey (United Kingdom) K Skupski	7^{7}	6
(Sweden) J Brunström (Finland) J Nieminen	4	6^{9}
(Belgium) O Rochus (Slovakia) I Zelenay	6	7^{11}
WC	(France) K de Schepper (France) F Martin	6	6
(Italy) F Cipolla (Russia) M Elgin	4	2
(Germany) M Emmrich (Sweden) A Siljeström	6^{8}	6	[7]
3	(Australia) P Hanley (United Kingdom) J Murray	7^{10}	3	[10]
Alt	(Russia) N Davydenko (Russia) I Kunitsyn	6	6
WC	(France) G Monfils (France) D Monfils	2	1
(Germany) D Brown (Croatia) L Zovko	7^{7}	6^{4}	[11]
2	(Czech Republic) F Čermák (Czech Republic) L Dlouhý	6^{5}	7^{7}	[9]

Quarterfinals
1	(United Kingdom) C Fleming (United Kingdom) R Hutchins	5	5
(France) N Mahut (France) É Roger-Vasselin	7	7
(Philippines) TC Huey (United Kingdom) K Skupski	6	6
(Belgium) O Rochus (Slovakia) I Zelenay	3	3
WC	(France) K de Schepper (France) F Martin	6^{6}	2
3	(Australia) P Hanley (United Kingdom) J Murray	7^{8}	6
Alt	(Russia) N Davydenko (Russia) I Kunitsyn	3	5
(Germany) D Brown (Croatia) L Zovko	6	7

Semifinals
(France) N Mahut (France) É Roger-Vasselin	6	6
(Philippines) TC Huey (United Kingdom) K Skupski	2	2
3	(Australia) P Hanley (United Kingdom) J Murray	6	3	[10]
(Germany) D Brown (Croatia) L Zovko	3	6	[5]

Final
(France) N Mahut (France) É Roger-Vasselin	6	7^{7}
3	(Australia) P Hanley (United Kingdom) J Murray	4	6^{4}
