= 2012 Open Sud de France – Singles =

Singles
- 2012 Open Sud de France

Final
- Champion: (Czech Republic) Tomáš Berdych
- Runner-up: (France) Gaël Monfils
- Score: 6–2, 4–6, 6–3

Details
- Draw: 28
- Seeds: 8

Events
Singles	Doubles
- Open Sud de France

Gaël Monfils was the last champion at the 2010 edition.
Tomáš Berdych won the final 6–2, 4–6, 6–3 against Gaël Monfils.

== Seeds ==
The top four seeds received a bye into the second round.

1. (Czech Republic) Tomáš Berdych (champion)
2. (France) Gilles Simon (semifinals)
3. (France) Gaël Monfils (final)
4. (France) Richard Gasquet (quarterfinals)
5. (Spain) Feliciano López (second round)
6. (Germany) Florian Mayer (second round)
7. (Germany) Philipp Kohlschreiber (semifinals)
8. (Finland) Jarkko Nieminen (quarterfinals)

== Draw ==
Key

- Q = Qualifier
- WC = Wild card
- LL = Lucky loser
- Alt = Alternate
- ITF = ITF entry
- PR = Protected ranking
- SR = Special ranking
- SE = Special exempt
- JE = Junior exempt
- JR = Junior Accelerator Programme entrant
- CO = College Accelerator Programme entrant
- NG = Next Gen Accelerator Program entrant
- w/o = Walkover
- r = Retired
- d = Defaulted

=== Finals ===
Semifinals
1	(Czech Republic) Tomáš Berdych	6	6
7	(Germany) Philipp Kohlschreiber	3	4
3	(France) Gaël Monfils	4	7^{7}	6
2	(France) Gilles Simon	6	6^{4}	4

Final
1	(Czech Republic) Tomáš Berdych	6	4	6
3	(France) Gaël Monfils	2	6	3

=== Top half ===
First round
(Germany) T Kamke	3	3
Q	(France) F Serra	6	6
(Spain) A Ramos	3	2
(France) N Mahut	6	6
(Luxembourg) G Müller	6^{3}	3
6	(Germany) F Mayer	7^{7}	6
(France) S Robert	2	1
WC	(Russia) N Davydenko	6	6
(France) É Roger-Vasselin	7	6
Q	(Spain) R Bautista Agut	5	2
(Belgium) O Rochus	1	4
7	(Germany) P Kohlschreiber	6	6

Second round
1	(Czech Republic) T Berdych	6	6
Q	(France) F Serra	0	2
(France) N Mahut	7^{7}	6
6	(Germany) F Mayer	6^{3}	3
4	(France) R Gasquet	6	6
WC	(Russia) N Davydenko	3	4
(France) É Roger-Vasselin	4	5
7	(Germany) P Kohlschreiber	6	7

Quarterfinals
1	(Czech Republic) T Berdych	6	6
(France) N Mahut	3	4
4	(France) R Gasquet	2	6	3
7	(Germany) P Kohlschreiber	6	3	6

Semifinals
1	(Czech Republic) T Berdych	6	6
7	(Germany) P Kohlschreiber	3	4

=== Bottom half ===
First round
8	(Finland) J Nieminen	6	3	6
Q	(France) M Teixeira	3	6	4
WC	(France) P-H Mathieu	6	6
(Germany) C-M Stebe	4	4
(United States) M Russell	6	7
(France) A Mannarino	3	5
5	(Spain) F López	6	7^{9}
(Russia) I Kunitsyn	4	6^{7}
WC	(France) G Rufin	6	7^{8}
(Canada) V Pospisil	4	6^{6}
Q	(France) M Gicquel	6	4	5
(Italy) F Cipolla	1	6	7

Second round
8	(Finland) J Nieminen	7^{7}	6
WC	(France) P-H Mathieu	6^{4}	1
(United States) M Russell	3	3
3	(France) G Monfils	6	6
5	(Spain) F López	6^{5}	3
WC	(France) G Rufin	7^{7}	6
(Italy) F Cipolla	3	2
2	(France) G Simon	6	6

Quarterfinals
8	(Finland) J Nieminen	3	3
3	(France) G Monfils	6	6
WC	(France) G Rufin	6^{6}	7^{7}	2
2	(France) G Simon	7^{8}	6^{2}	6

Semifinals
3	(France) G Monfils	4	7^{7}	6
2	(France) G Simon	6	6^{4}	4

== Qualifying ==
=== Seeds ===
1. (Italy) Simone Bolelli (qualifying competition)
2. (France) Kenny de Schepper (second round)
3. (Spain) Pablo Carreño Busta (qualifying competition)
4. (France) Marc Gicquel (qualified)
5. (France) Florent Serra (qualified)
6. (France) Augustin Gensse (first round)
7. (France) Maxime Teixeira (qualified)
8. (Belgium) David Goffin (first round)

=== Qualifiers ===
1. (France) Maxime Teixeira
2. (Spain) Roberto Bautista Agut
3. (France) Florent Serra
4. (France) Marc Gicquel

== Qualifying draw ==
=== First qualifier ===
First round
(France) Pierre-Hugues Herbert	7^{7}	7^{8}
(France) Jérôme Inzerillo	6^{2}	6^{6}
(France) Fabrice Martin	6	6
(France) Josselin Ouanna	3	4
(Russia) Mikhail Elgin	6^{6}	1
7	(France) Maxime Teixeira	7^{8}	6

Second round
1	(Italy) Simone Bolelli	6	6
(France) Pierre-Hugues Herbert	4	4
(France) Fabrice Martin	6^{3}	5
7	(France) Maxime Teixeira	7^{7}	7

Qualifying competition
1	(Italy) Simone Bolelli	5	3
7	(France) Maxime Teixeira	7	6

=== Second qualifier ===
First round
(Germany) Peter Gojowczyk	3	1
(Spain) Roberto Bautista Agut	6	6
(Belgium) Niels Desein	4	6	3
(Germany) Mischa Zverev	6	1	6
(France) Romain Jouan	6	6
6	(France) Augustin Gensse	4	3

Second round
2	(France) Kenny de Schepper	5	7^{7}	6^{5}
(Spain) Roberto Bautista Agut	7	6^{5}	7^{7}
(Germany) Mischa Zverev	3	2
(France) Romain Jouan	6	6

Qualifying competition
(Spain) Roberto Bautista Agut	3	6	6
(France) Romain Jouan	6	3	2

=== Third qualifier ===
First round			Second round					Qualifying competition
			3	(Spain) Pablo Carreño Busta	4	6	7^{7}
(France) Dorian Descloix	2	5		(Republic of Ireland) Conor Niland	6	2	6^{5}
(Republic of Ireland) Conor Niland	6	7						3	(Spain) Pablo Carreño Busta	4	2
(Spain) Íñigo Cervantes Huegun	6	7						5	(France) Florent Serra	6	6
(Lithuania) Laurynas Grigelis	3	5		(Spain) Íñigo Cervantes Huegun	2	3
			5	(France) Florent Serra	6	6

=== Fourth qualifier ===
First round
(France) Vincent Millot	6	6
(Belgium) Clément Maas	2	1
(France) Albano Olivetti	6	4	6^{4}
(France) Jonathan Dasnières de Veigy	4	6	7^{7}
(Netherlands) Igor Sijsling	6	6
8	(Belgium) David Goffin	3	3

Second round
4	(France) Marc Gicquel	7	6
(France) Vincent Millot	5	2
(France) Jonathan Dasnières de Veigy	6	6
(Netherlands) Igor Sijsling	1	3

Qualifying competition
4	(France) Marc Gicquel	6	6
(France) Jonathan Dasnières de Veigy	3	3
