= 2010 Open Sud de France =

- Date: 25–31 October 2010
- Edition: 24th
- Category: World Tour 250 Series
- Draw: 28S / 16D
- Prize money: €575,250
- Surface: Hard / indoor
- Location: Montpellier, France
- Venue: Arena Montpellier

Champions

Singles
- (France) Gaël Monfils

Doubles
- (Australia) Stephen Huss / (United Kingdom) Ross Hutchins
← 2009 ·	Open Sud de France	· 2012 →

The 2010 Open Sud de France was a men's tennis tournament played on indoor hard courts. It was the 24th edition of the Open Sud de France, and was part of the World Tour 250 Series of the 2010 ATP World Tour. It was held at the Arena Montpellier in Montpellier, France, from 25 October through 31 October 2010. It was the first edition to be held under the new title and the first in Montpellier, after Lyon lost the tournament. The tournament marked the first time since 1993 that top level professional tennis was played in the city.

Gaël Monfils won the singles title.

== ATP entrants ==
=== Seeds ===
Country	Player	Rank^{1}	Seed
RUS	Nikolay Davydenko	11	1
FRA	Jo-Wilfried Tsonga	13	2
FRA	Gaël Monfils	15	3
CRO	Ivan Ljubičić	17	4
USA	John Isner	20	5
ESP	Albert Montañés	23	6
FRA	Richard Gasquet	28	7
ARG	David Nalbandian	31	8

- Seeds are based on the rankings of October 18, 2010.

=== Other entrants ===
The following players received wildcards into the singles main draw:

- (France) Nicolas Mahut
- (Argentina) David Nalbandian
- (France) Benoît Paire

The following players received entry from the qualifying draw:

- (Belgium) Steve Darcis
- (France) Romain Jouan
- (France) Adrian Mannarino
- (Germany) Mischa Zverev

== Finals ==
=== Singles ===
(France) Gaël Monfils defeated (Croatia) Ivan Ljubičić, 6–2, 5–7, 6–1

- It was Monfils' 1st title of the year and 3rd of his career.

=== Doubles ===
(Australia) Stephen Huss / (United Kingdom) Ross Hutchins defeated (Spain) Marc López / (Argentina) Eduardo Schwank, 6–2, 4–6, [10–7]
