= Daryl Monfils =

French tennis player

- Country (sports): France
- Born: 1 March 1993 (age 32); Paris, France
- Plays: Right-handed (two-handed backhand)
- College: VCU
- Prize money: $1,650

Singles
- Career record: 0–0 (at ATP Tour level, Grand Slam level, and in Davis Cup)
- Career titles: 0

Doubles
- Career record: 0–1 (at ATP Tour level, Grand Slam level, and in Davis Cup)
- Career titles: 0
- Last updated on: 20 February 2017.

Daryl Monfils (born 1 March 1993) is a French tennis player.

Monfils made his ATP main draw debut at the 2012 Open Sud de France in the doubles draw partnering his brother Gaël Monfils in which they lost in the first round.
