= Gaël Monfils =

French tennis player (born 1986)

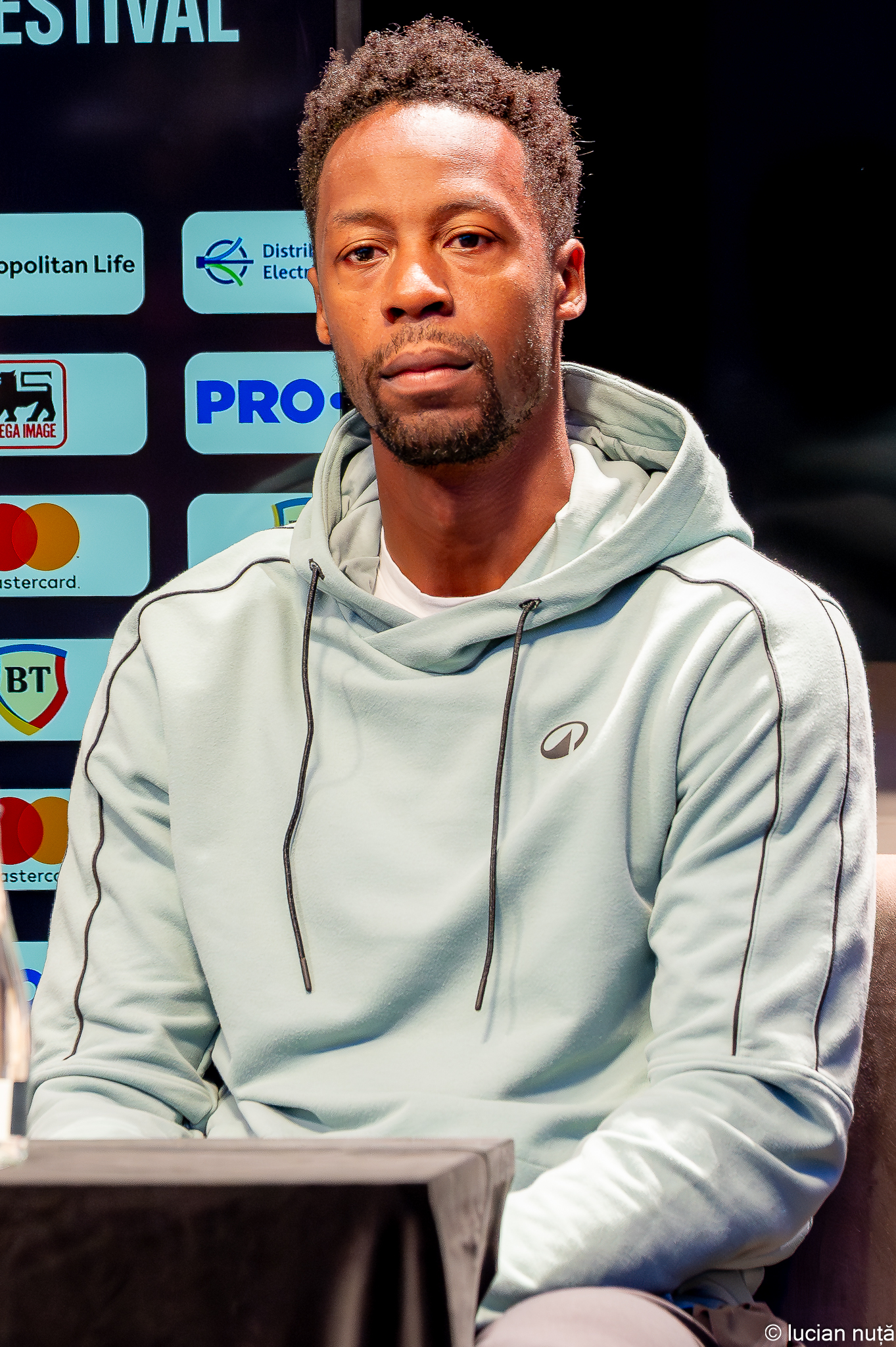
- Monfils in 2026
- Full name: Gaël Sébastien Monfils
- Country (sports): France
- Residence: Geneva, Switzerland
- Born: 1 September 1986 (age 40) Paris, France
- Height: 1.93 m (6 ft 4 in)
- Turned pro: 2004
- Retired: 5 October 2026
- Plays: Right handed (two-handed backhand)
- Coach: Mikael Tillström (2015–2020, 2023–2026) Previous coaches: Thierry Champion (2004–2006); Tarik Benhabiles (2007–2008); Roger Rasheed (2008–2011); Patrick Chamagne (2011–2013); Jan de Witt (2015); Liam Smith (2019–2020); Richard Ruckelshausen (2021–2023); Günter Bresnik (2021–2023)
- Prize money: US $25,067,477: 25th all-time in earnings

Singles
- Career record: 588–359 (62.1%)
- Career titles: 13
- Highest ranking: No. 6 (7 November 2016)

Grand Slam singles results
- Australian Open: QF (2016, 2022)
- French Open: SF (2008)
- Wimbledon: 4R (2018)
- US Open: SF (2016)

Other tournaments
- Tour Finals: RR (2016)
- Olympic Games: QF (2008, 2016)

Doubles
- Career record: 29–86 (25.2%)
- Career titles: 0
- Highest ranking: No. 155 (8 August 2011)

Grand Slam doubles results
- Australian Open: 1R (2006)
- French Open: 2R (2007)
- US Open: 1R (2005)

Other doubles tournaments
- Olympic Games: 2R (2020, 2024)

Mixed doubles
- Career record: 2–4

Grand Slam mixed doubles results
- Australian Open: 2R (2006)
- French Open: 2R (2008)
- US Open: SF (2026)
- Spouse: Elina Svitolina (m. 2021; div. 2026)

Gaël Sébastien Monfils (French pronunciation: [ɡaɛl mɔ̃fis]; born 1 September 1986) is a French former professional tennis player. He was ranked as high as world No. 6 by the Association of Tennis Professionals (ATP), achieved in November 2016. Monfils won 13 ATP Tour singles titles, out of 35 finals contested. His best singles results at the majors were two semifinals, at the 2008 French Open and the 2016 US Open.

Monfils was named the ATP Newcomer of the Year in 2005. He reached at least one ATP Tour singles final every year for 19 consecutive seasons from 2005 to 2023, and is one of five players in the Open Era to do so for 19 or more seasons. In 2025, Monfils became the oldest ATP Tour champion since the Tour's establishment in 1990. He retired from the sport in 2026.

== Early life ==
Gaël Sébastien Monfils was born on 1 September 1986 in Paris, where he was raised. His father, Rufin Monfils, is from Guadeloupe and is a former pro football player and France Telecom employee. His mother, Sylvette Cartesse, is from Martinique and worked as a nurse.

== Career ==
=== 2002–2004: Juniors ===
Monfils played his first junior match in January 2002 at the age of 15 at a grade 4 tournament in Sweden. Through his 2002–2004 junior career, he compiled a singles win–loss record of 83–22, reaching the No. 1 junior combined world ranking in February 2004. Over the course of the same year, he won the boys' singles titles at the Australian Open, the French Open and Wimbledon. He was also crowned International Tennis Federation youth world champion. His win streak at junior majors ended at the US Open with a third-round loss to Viktor Troicki. Also in 2002, Monfils finished runner-up at the Dutch Junior Open and won the German Junior Open. He ended the year ranked as the No. 4 junior in the world and also represented France in the Junior Davis Cup.

In 2003, Monfils got off to a positive start and earned his first career ATP point at the France Futures No. 13 by reaching the second round. He also reached the second round at the France Futures No. 14, Egypt Futures No. 2 and the Spain Futures No. 28. In that year, he played a total of nine Futures events. This included a showing in the doubles final at the Spain Futures No. 27. In junior events, he was a finalist at Orange Bowl (losing to Marcos Baghdatis) and USTA International4 Winter Championships (losing to Sebastian Rieschick). He reached the quarterfinals of the Australian Open juniors tournament (losing to Florin Mergea) and won the doubles title at the Victorian Junior Championships (with Josselin Ouanna). He was No. 21 in the junior rankings at the end of the year.

In 2004, the French teenager finished as the world's No. 1 junior, winning the first three of four junior Grand Slam events (Australian Open, French Open and Wimbledon). He improved his ATP Entry Ranking by over 700 positions. In October, he made his ATP debut as a wildcard entrant at the Moselle Open in Metz and, after winning his first ATP match against Xavier Malisse, reached the quarterfinals in which he lost to countryman Richard Gasquet. He qualified for the 2004 Paris Masters and reached the second round, beating former Top 10 player Thomas Enqvist before falling to world No. 3, Lleyton Hewitt. He won junior titles at the Australian Open, French Open (defeating Alex Kuznetsov) and Wimbledon. He did not drop a set in Australia and lost one set each at the French Open and Wimbledon. He reached the third round at the US Open (losing to Viktor Troicki). He also won the LTA International Junior Championship in Roehampton (defeating Andy Murray). He was the runner-up at the Australian Hardcourt Junior Championships (losing to Mischa Zverev) and was 31–2 in junior events. In April, he reached his first Futures final at the Italy Futures No. 4. A week later, he won his first title at the Great Britain Futures No. 1 (defeating Alex Bogdanović). He reached the quarterfinals of the Grenoble Challenger. He went 14–6 in Futures and 3–5 in Challengers in 2004.

In doubles, Monfils reached the final at the France Futures No. 7 (with Ouanna). He reached the semifinals at the Australian Open and the quarterfinals at the French Open (with Ouanna).

==== Junior Grand Slam performance – Singles ====
Australian Open: W (2004)
French Open: W (2004)
Wimbledon: W (2004)
US Open: 3R (2004)

==== Junior Grand Slam performance – Doubles ====
Australian Open: SF (2004)
French Open: QF (2004)
Wimbledon: A (-)
US Open: A (-)

=== 2004: Turned pro, ATP Tour debut and quarterfinal ===
Monfils officially turned pro in 2004 at the age of 17. He solely played ITF Futures events from early 2003 to mid 2004 winning two titles.

Monfils made his ATP Tour debut at the 2004 Open de Moselle after receiving a wildcard into the main draw, where he defeated 2nd seed Xavier Malisse in the first round for his first ever tour win. He followed this up with another victory over Olivier Patience in the second round to reach the quarterfinals where he lost to fellow wildcard and junior and eventual finalist Richard Gasquet, in straight sets. Three weeks later, he qualified for the 2004 Paris Masters, his first Masters 1000 tournament. There, he defeated fellow qualifier and former world No. 4, Thomas Enqvist, in the first round before losing in the second round to second seed and world No. 3, Lleyton Hewitt, in straight sets.

Monfils ended 2004 with a year-end ranking of world No. 239, a remarkable jump from his ranking of No. 925 at the start of the year.

=== 2005: First ATP Tour title ===
After having turned pro the previous year, the young Frenchman then made one of the biggest moves into the top 50 from the previous season, climbing 200 ranking spots and capturing his first ATP title whilst also reaching two additional finals. In the first six months, he won Challenger titles in Besançon and Tunis, defeating Christophe Rochus and Fabrice Santoro, respectively. He would then reach the fourth round at the Miami Masters during this time (losing to Dominik Hrbatý), as well as the third round of Wimbledon, before losing to Mario Ančić. Monfils compiled a 10–14 record in ATP Tour-level play and 12–1 in Challengers through July.

In the last three months, he went 15–8, highlighted by his first career clay title at the Sopot Open, defeating Florian Mayer in the final. Monfils then struggled with a 2–5 mark, before reaching the final in two of the last three indoor tournaments of the season, both in his native country in Metz (losing to Ivan Ljubičić) and Lyon (losing to Andy Roddick). He went 11–4 in tie-breaks and 1–2 vs. top 10 opponents, defeating world No. 10, Gastón Gaudio, in his first match of the season in Doha. Monfils compiled records of 12–10 on hard courts, 6–7 on clay, 5–2 on carpet and 2–3 on grass. He finished the year as the No. 3 Frenchman, behind only world No. 16, Richard Gasquet, and world No. 26, Sébastien Grosjean.

=== 2006: Top 25 ===
In his first tournament of 2006, Doha, he reached the final, but lost in two sets to world No. 1, Roger Federer. In a surprising event in Las Vegas, there was a paddle tennis tournament held by the Tennis Channel. Monfils was given a wildcard into the doubles event, but became more interested and inquired about getting a singles wildcard into the main draw. However, he received an entry into the qualifying singles (which he won). Monfils competed in the main draw of this paddle tennis tournament and surprised everyone when he ousted world No. 1 paddle tennis player Scott Freedman and eventually went on to win the whole tournament.

In May, Monfils reached the semifinals of the Rome Masters, before losing to eventual champion Rafael Nadal, in straight sets. En route to the semifinals, Monfils defeated former world No. 1, Andy Roddick. He then entered the Hamburg Masters event, where he lost in straight sets to fellow teenager Andy Murray in the first round. After that, he faced Murray once more, this time in the first round of the French Open. After a tough five–set battle, Monfils emerged victorious. Monfils then proceeded to play Belgian Dick Norman in the second round. Once again, the match went to five sets, and Monfils got the better of his opponent. He then faced his toughest opponent yet, American James Blake. Blake was the favourite for the win, as the eighth seed, while Monfils was seeded 25th. However, Monfils defeated Blake in another five-set match. He described this run as a marathon. Blake said of Monfils that 'he was the fastest man on the tour'. The fourth round was Monfils' last, as he lost to Novak Djokovic in straight sets.

As a result of his progress at the French Open, Monfils moved up five positions to reach a then career high of No. 23. This also made him the number-one player in France, two positions ahead of Sébastien Grosjean. Monfils then entered the Stella Artois Championships, where he won his first-round match against Jürgen Melzer. He then played the American Bobby Reynolds and won in straight sets. His third-round encounter with Ivan Ljubičić was the third time he faced the world No. 4. Monfils triumphed in straight sets. His quarterfinal draw was with James Blake, whom he had met earlier at the French Open. This time Blake succeeded. After having lost a set, Monfils retired as a result of a back injury. This injury effectively ruled him out of the Nottingham Open the following week.

At Wimbledon, Monfils suffered a surprising first-round exit when defeated by Igor Kunitsyn. Monfils won the first set, but ended up losing the next three.

=== 2007: 50 career singles wins ===
At the 2007 Australian Open, Monfils lost to his compatriot Richard Gasquet in the third round in four sets. Monfils had a good run in Poertschach as a warm-up for the French Open, but lost in the final against Juan Mónaco of Argentina in straight sets. He lost in the third round of the French Open to David Nalbandian in a four-set match. At Wimbledon, Monfils reached the third round without dropping a set, where he lost to Nikolay Davydenko, the sixth seed, in straight sets. In July, Monfils made it to the semifinals of the 2007 Legg Mason Tennis Classic, before losing to American John Isner in three tiebreaks. Monfils withdrew from the 2007 US Open with a hamstring injury. He also was forced to withdraw from the 2008 Australian Open due to the same injury.

=== 2008: French Open semifinals ===
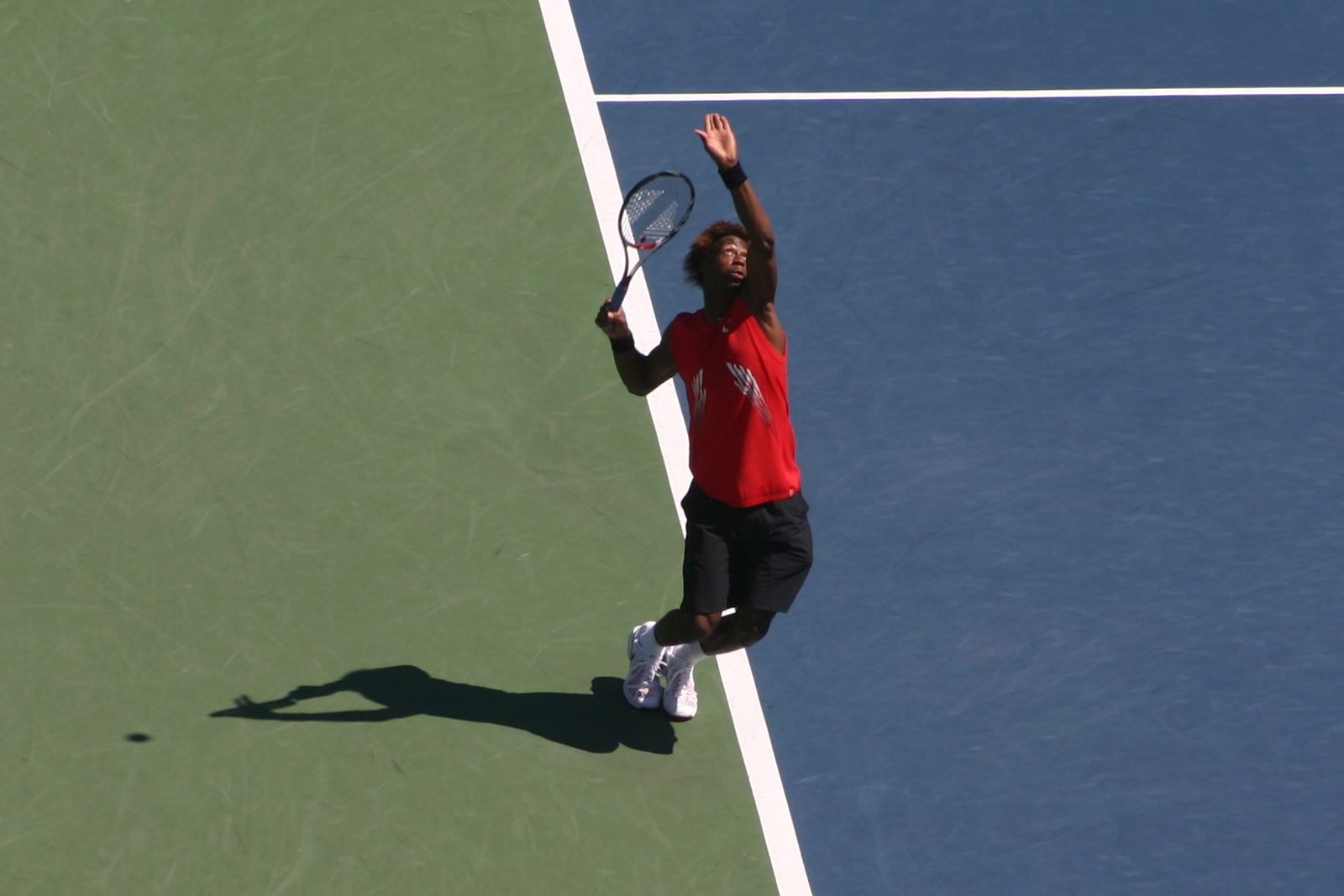
Monfils at the 2008 US Open

At the 2008 French Open, Monfils reached a semifinals berth for the first time at any Grand Slam, becoming the first Frenchman to reach the semifinals since 2001. Monfils was defeated by top seed Roger Federer in four sets. A shoulder injury forced Monfils to withdraw from Wimbledon shortly before he was due to play his first-round match. Monfils was selected by France to play at the Olympics in Beijing, where he lost to third seed Novak Djokovic in the quarterfinals. At the 2008 US Open, Monfils lost in the fourth round to Mardy Fish in straight sets, after having previously defeated former world No. 3 David Nalbandian, also in straight sets. At the Thailand Open, Monfils reached the semifinals, losing to Jo-Wilfried Tsonga in two sets. Monfils lost in the final of the BA-CA Tennis Trophy in straight sets to Philipp Petzschner in the final.

=== 2009: Top 10, second ATP Tour title and first Masters final ===
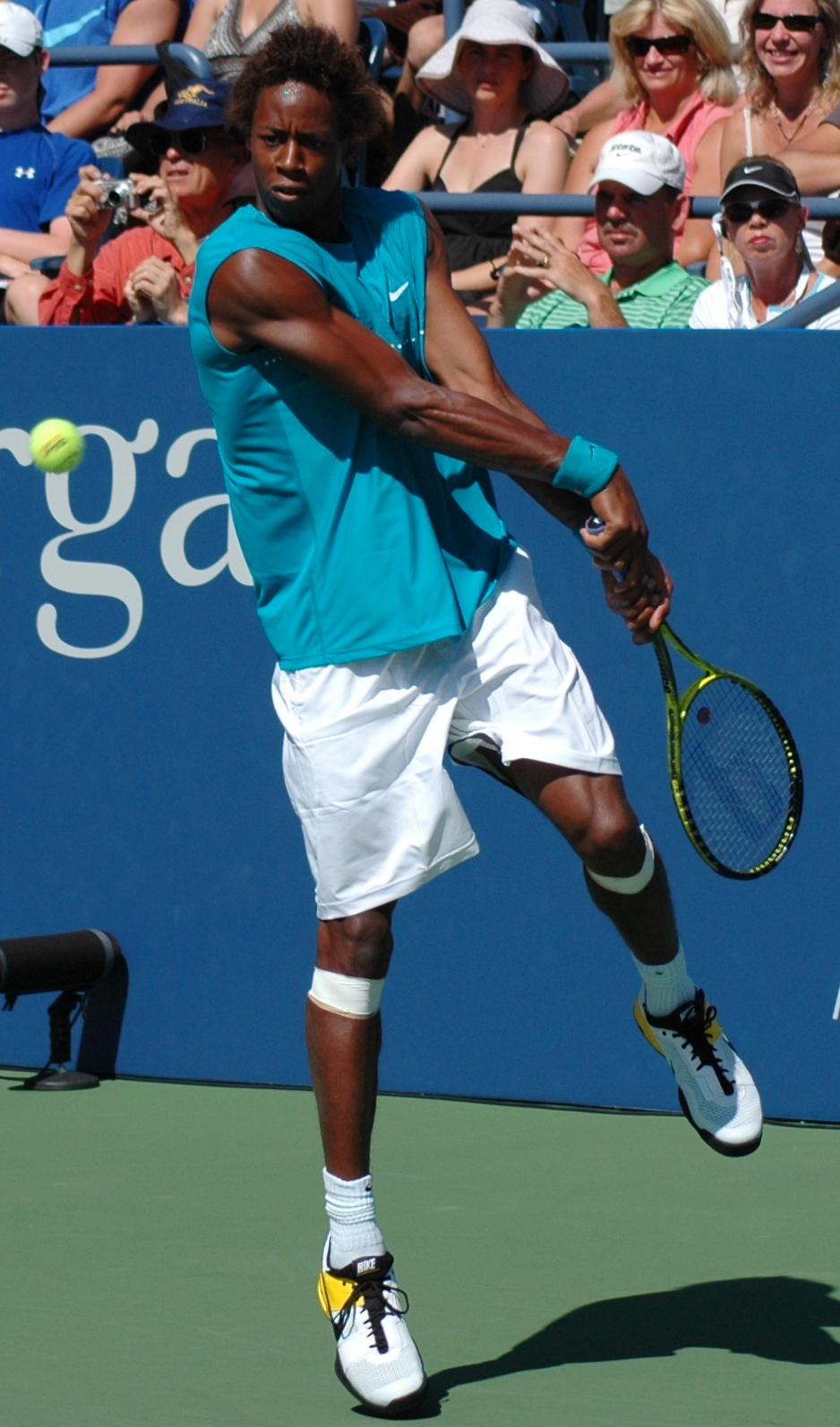
Monfils at the 2009 US Open

Monfils played his first tournament at the Qatar Open and caused a two-set upset in the quarterfinals against Rafael Nadal. Monfils lost to finalist Andy Roddick in three sets, after being up a break in the first set and losing it. At the 2009 Australian Open, Monfils lost to fellow Frenchman Gilles Simon in the fourth round, retiring due to a wrist injury. At the Abierto Mexicano, Monfils lost in the final to Nicolás Almagro. Monfils competed at the Monte Carlo Masters, losing in the first round to Janko Tipsarević in straight sets.

His recent knee injury, caused by Osgood-Schlatter disease, resulted in his withdrawal from both the Rome Masters and the Madrid Masters. However, he competed at the French Open and easily won his first-round match against Bobby Reynolds. He then completed another straight-set victory in the second round by overcoming Victor Crivoi. In the third round, Monfils beat Jürgen Melzer in four sets. Against Melzer, Monfils made one of the most spectacular plays of the tournament, hitting a diving shot back to Melzer, sliding to save another point of Melzer and then putting the point away. He then played a much-anticipated fourth-round match against Andy Roddick, who made 28 unforced errors en route to losing to Monfils in straight sets. Monfils then lost, as in the previous year, to Roger Federer, this time in the quarterfinals.

Monfils withdrew from Wimbledon due to a wrist injury. Monfils returned to competition at the Canadian Masters. In his first-round match, he defeated Marat Safin. He then lost to qualifier Juan Carlos Ferrero in his second match, ending his Masters tournament campaign. At the 2009 US Open, he lost to world No. 3 Rafael Nadal in the fourth round in four sets. However, Monfils would bounce back from that defeat by winning the Open de Moselle. As the No. 1 seed, he ended up facing Philipp Kohlschreiber in the final and won in two sets. Despite suffering from jetlag, Monfils also made the quarterfinals at the Malaysian Open, held in Kuala Lumpur, where he was beaten in straight sets by Nikolay Davydenko.

At the Japan Open, Monfils reached the semifinal stage, losing to eventual champion Jo-Wilfried Tsonga. His next tournament was the Shanghai Masters, losing against Ivan Ljubičić in the third round. He lost the first set and then was forced to retire with a back injury. At the 2009 Paris Masters, Monfils made his first Masters final, where was defeated by Novak Djokovic.

=== 2010: Third career title ===
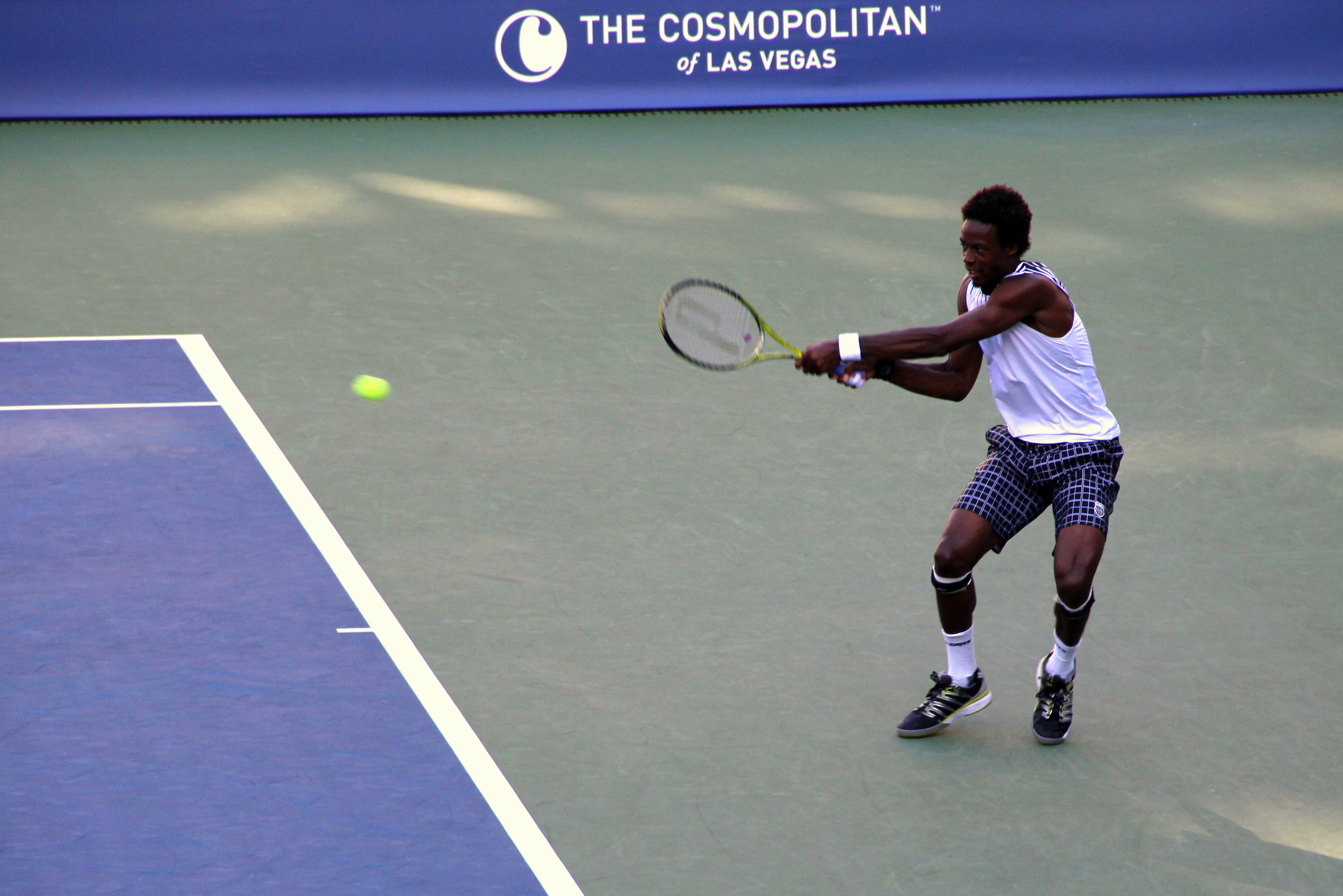
Monfils at the 2010 US Open

Monfils began his season at the Brisbane International, where he was seeded third. He lost to defending champion, Czech Radek Štěpánek in the semifinals. He withdrew from the Sydney International in Australia, citing a shoulder injury. At the 2010 Australian Open, Monfils lost in the round of 32 to John Isner in four sets. Monfils was the first seed at the SA Tennis Open, where he lost in the semifinals to Feliciano López. He then played in the World Tennis Tournament in Rotterdam, where he fell in the quarterfinals to the eventual runner-up, Russian Mikhail Youzhny in three sets. Monfils also fell in the quarterfinals at the 2010 Open 13 in Marseille, France, as the third seed to Julien Benneteau in straight sets.

At the Indian Wells Masters, seeded 12th, after receiving a bye in the first round, Monfils lost to Simon Greul in three sets. Monfils withdrew from three consecutive Masters 1000 events – the Sony Ericsson Open, the Monte Carlo Masters and the Rome Masters. He was set to return at the Estoril Open and receive a wildcard, but withdrew due to a stomach injury. He finally made his return at the Madrid Masters and reached the quarterfinals without losing a set, where he lost to third seed Rafael Nadal. He then played at the Open de Nice Côte d'Azur in France, where he lost in the quarterfinals to Potito Starace. His next tournament was the French Open, where he had reached the quarterfinals the year before. He was up two sets and a break, before being upset by Fabio Fognini in a match over two days.

Starting his grass-court season, Monfils lost in the second round at the Eastbourne Championships to Rainer Schüttler in three sets. Playing at Wimbledon for the first time since 2007, he won his first match in straight sets against Leonardo Mayer, and his second round match in four sets against Karol Beck. He eventually lost to grass-court specialist and former Wimbledon champion, Lleyton Hewitt, in straight sets. At the 2010 MercedesCup, he reached his first final of the year by beating Daniel Gimeno-Traver, in three sets. He was forced to retire in the final against Albert Montañés.

At the 2010 US Open, he lost to Novak Djokovic in three sets in windy conditions. It was his first quarterfinals at a major besides the French Open. He is also the first Frenchman to make the US Open quarterfinals since Arnaud Clément in 2000. Monfils was runner-up at the Japan Open, losing to Rafael Nadal in two sets. At the Open Sud de France, Monfils won his third tournament, defeating Ivan Ljubičić in three sets. Monfils was seeded 12th at the 2010 Paris Masters and successfully reached the final for the second consecutive year, this time also scoring three top 10 wins (Fernando Verdasco in third round, Andy Murray in the quarterfinals and Roger Federer in the semifinals) en route to doing so. In the final, he was defeated by Robin Söderling.

=== 2011: 200 career singles wins ===
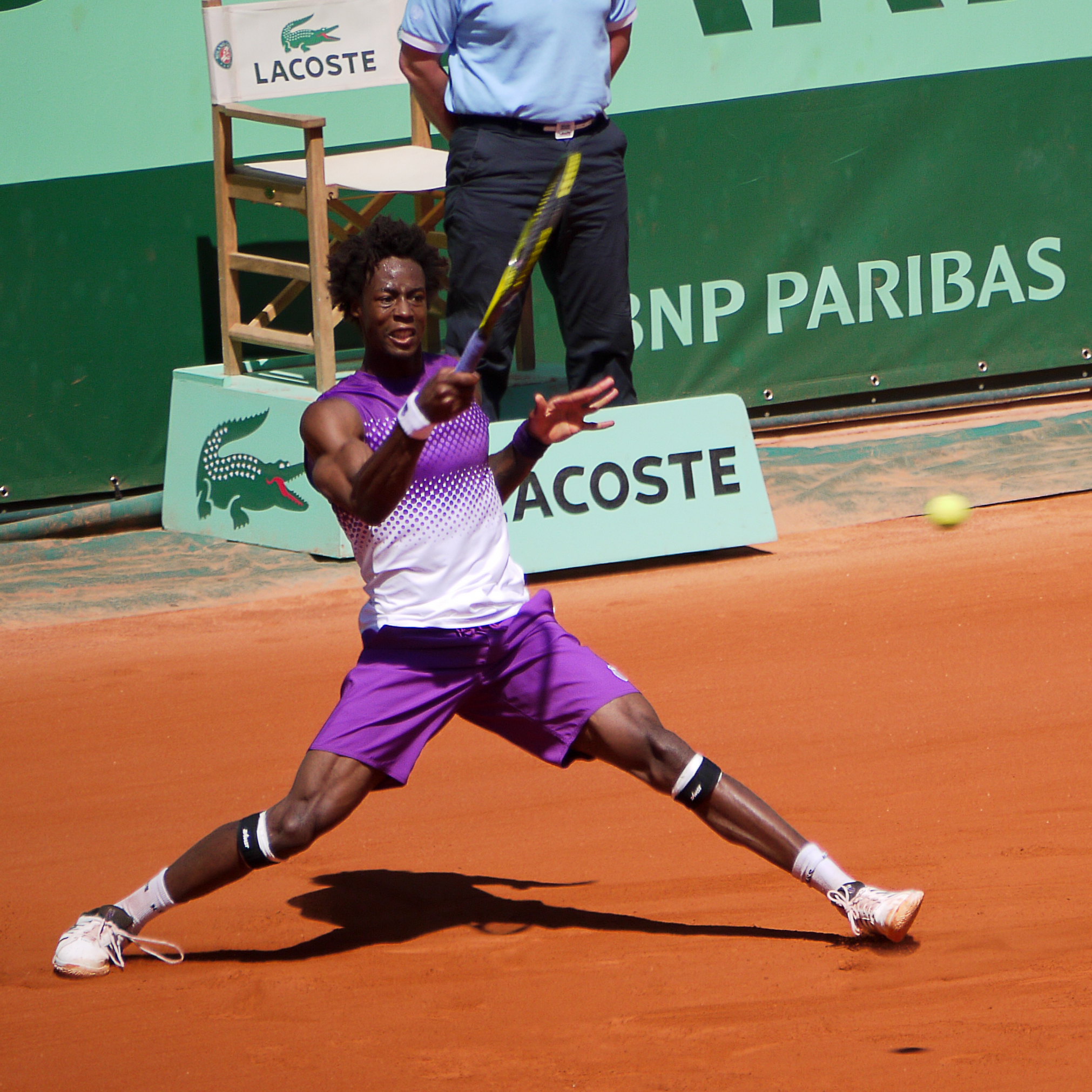
Monfils at the 2011 French Open

Monfils started 2011 at the AAMI Kooyong Classic where, in the final, he lost to Lleyton Hewitt. Following the 2011 Australian Open, Monfils next played in San Jose. He was able to reach the semifinals, before he had to withdraw with a left wrist injury that had been affecting him since January.

At the 2011 French Open, Monfils defeated seventh seed David Ferrer in five sets to reach the quarterfinals. In the quarterfinals, he lost to Roger Federer in straight sets. Monfils entered Wimbledon as the ninth seed. He defeated Matthias Bachinger and Grega Žemlja before falling in the third round to Łukasz Kubot of Poland in four sets.

At the Washington Tennis Classic, he reached the finals with victories over Ryan Sweeting, Dmitry Tursunov, Janko Tipsarević and John Isner. In the final, he lost in straight sets to Radek Štěpánek. He reached the quarterfinals of both the Canadian Masters and the Cincinnati Masters, where he lost to Novak Djokovic. In July, he reached his career-high ranking of world No. 7. At the 2011 US Open, he lost in the second round to Juan Carlos Ferrero in a hard-fought five set match. Monfils then won his fourth career title in October at the Stockholm Open by beating Jarkko Nieminen in the final. It was Nieminen's 11th ATP Tour-level final and Monfils' 15th.

=== 2012: Setbacks and injuries ===
Monfils began 2012 reaching the final of the Qatar Open. On his way to the final, he beat Rui Machado, Benjamin Becker, Viktor Troicki and Rafael Nadal. In the final, Monfils faced Jo-Wilfried Tsonga, who had received a walkover after Roger Federer withdrew from the tournament due to a back problem. Monfils proceeded to lose the final in straight sets. At the 2012 Australian Open, Monfils progressed to the third round before bowing out to Mikhail Kukushkin in five sets. Monfils was suffering from a back injury he received in the previous round. In his next tournament, Montpellier, Monfils reached the final, losing to Tomáš Berdych in three sets. This brought his finals record to just 4 titles out of 17 finals.

He reached the third round of the 2012 Madrid Masters, again losing to Berdych. He did not play on tour after Nice from May to September due to a knee injury. The comeback came in September in Metz, where he reached the quarterfinals, but lost to Andreas Seppi in three sets. After 2 more tournaments, Monfils withdrew from the 2012 Japan Open in October, citing pain in his right knee and ended his season early.

=== 2013: Return to top 40 ===
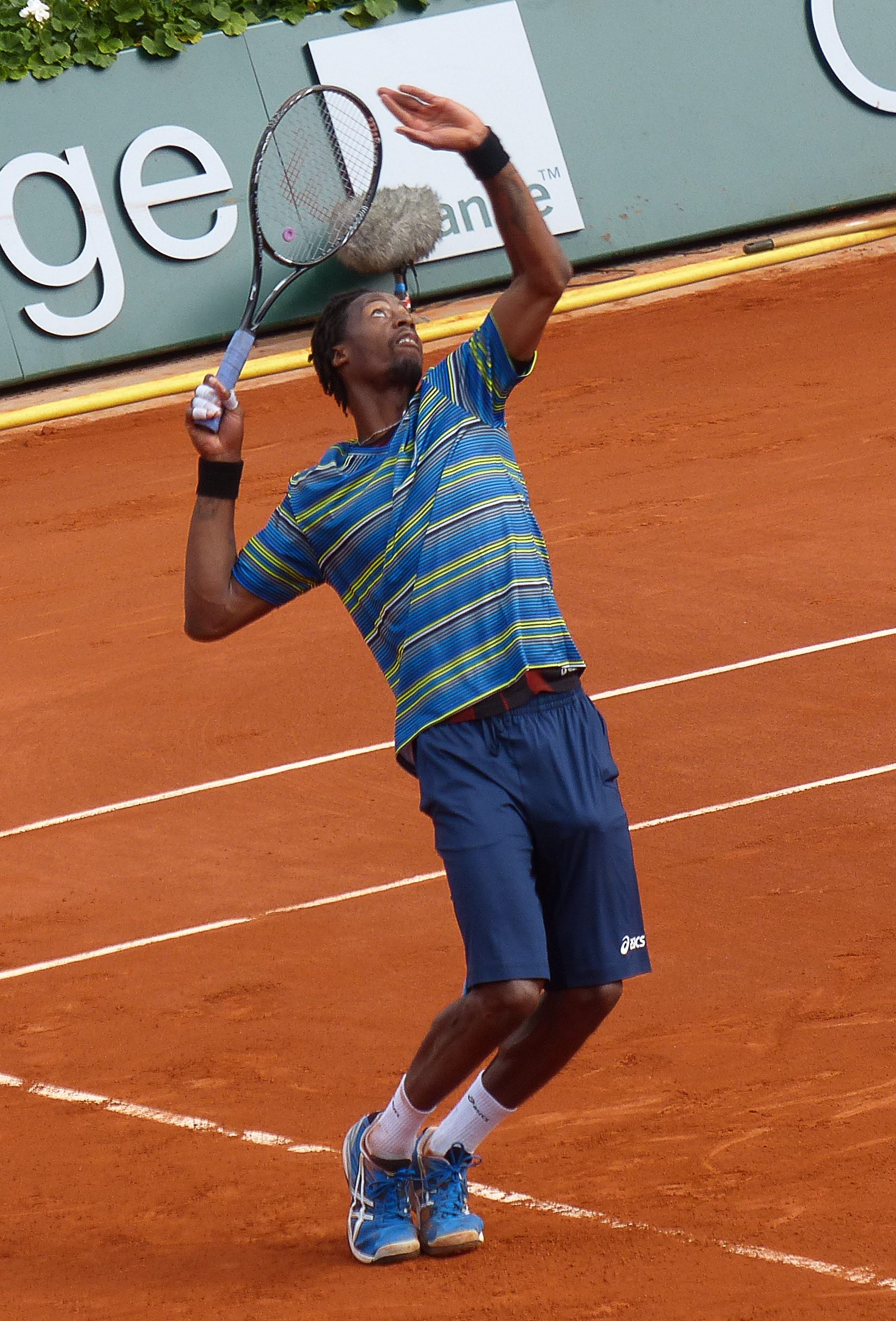
Monfils at the 2013 French Open

Monfils attempted another comeback with the beginning of the 2013 season in Doha, where he was able to reach the quarterfinals. He reached the semifinals in Auckland, being eliminated by David Ferrer. He made it to the third round of the Australian Open, but was defeated there by compatriot Gilles Simon.

He then played in Montpellier, where he was defeated in the second round by Richard Gasquet. He received a wildcard into Rotterdam, but was defeated in the first round by Juan Martín del Potro. He received a wildcard for the 2013 French Open after a good clay season with a win at the Bordeaux Challenger and a final at the Nice ATP tournament, he upset Berdych in the first round of the French Open, who was seeded fifth. He continued his quest by defeating Ernests Gulbis in round two. In the third round he faced Tommy Robredo. Monfils won the first two sets, but lost the last three. During the match, Monfils had four match points, but could not win any of them. Monfils reached the final in Winston-Salem, but bowed out to Austria's Jürgen Melzer in the second set due to an unspecified injury, securing the championship for Melzer. Just three days later on 27 August, Monfils defeated 105th-ranked Adrian Ungur of Romania in the first round of the US Open but lost to John Isner in the second round.

At the 2013 Shanghai Masters in October, Monfils upset fifth seed Roger Federer in the third round before losing to world No. 2, defending and eventual champion Novak Djokovic in the quarterfinals.

=== 2014: 300 career singles wins ===
Monfils reached his third final in Doha and lost to Rafael Nadal in three sets. He was once again beaten by Nadal in the third round of the 2014 Australian Open.

Monfils bounced back by winning Montpellier, defeating Richard Gasquet. He hurt his wrist in a match against Grigor Dimitrov and did not play again until the 2014 French Open, where he made it to the quarterfinals, before losing to Andy Murray.

At the 2014 US Open, Monfils reached the quarterfinals for a second time and just narrowly missed reaching his second Grand Slam semifinal when he lost to Roger Federer in five sets, despite leading by two sets to love and holding two match points against his serve in the fourth set.

In the Davis Cup final held in Lille, Monfils won the second match against Roger Federer in straight sets. France however, went on to become the tournament runners-up, losing to Switzerland 3–1.

=== 2015: Return to top 15 ===
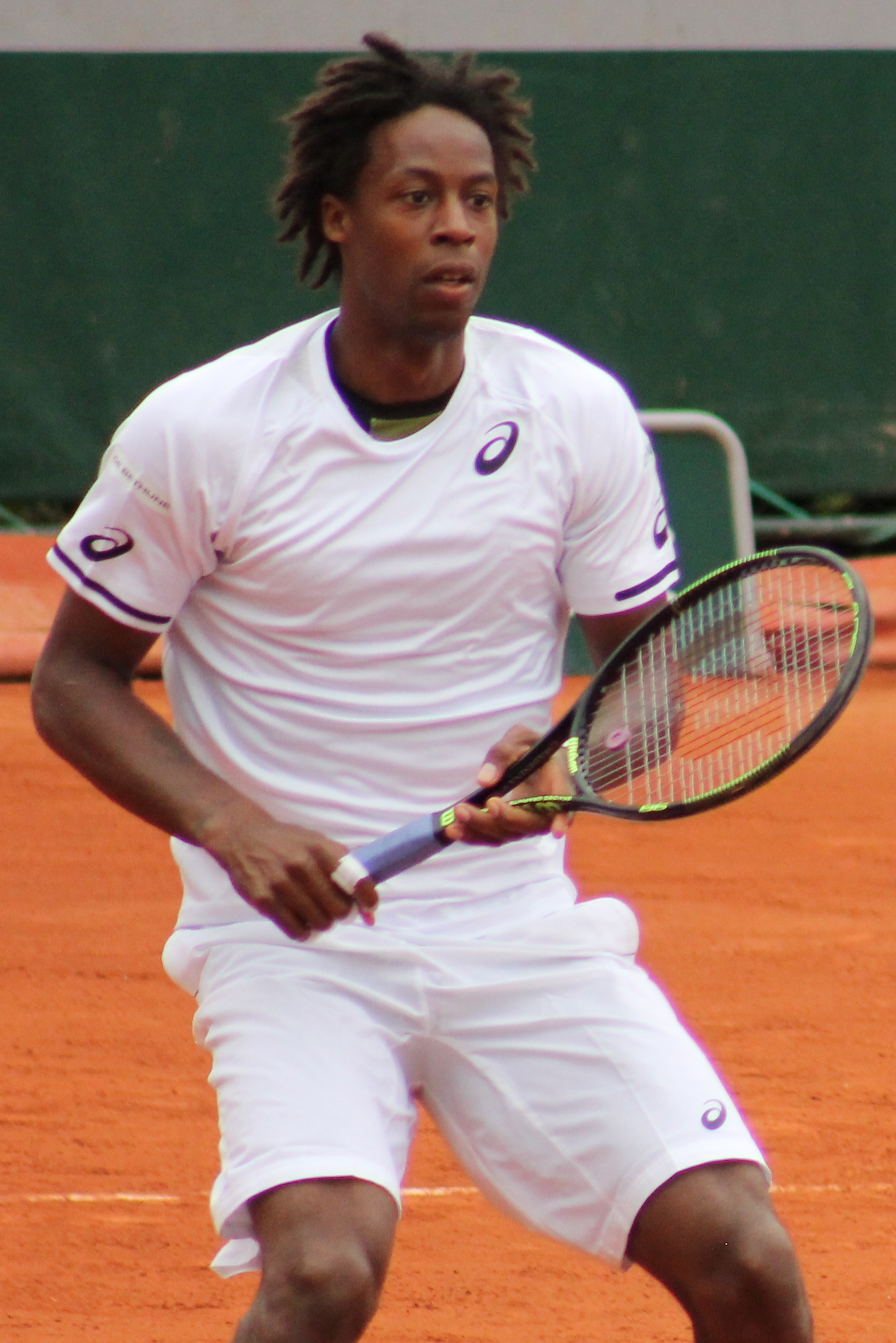
Monfils at the 2015 French Open

Monfils played his first tournament at the 2015 Australian Open. He defeated Lucas Pouille in five sets in the first round, before being ousted against Jerzy Janowicz in another five-setter.

He reached the final of the Open 13 in Marseille, that of which saw him lose to Gilles Simon.

For his season debut on clay at the Monte Carlo Masters, he successively beat Andrey Kuznetsov, Roger Federer and Grigor Dimitrov but lost to Tomáš Berdych in the semifinals.

At the 2015 French Open, he defeated Édouard Roger-Vasselin in the first round and Diego Schwartzman in the second round in five sets but his best performance remains the third round match against Pablo Cuevas. As Cuevas led two sets to one and was serving up two breaks in the fourth set, he faced a different Monfils, galvanized by the crowd, who came back and won in five sets. Monfils then lost in the round of 16 to Roger Federer in four sets.

The grass season started well for Monfils as he reached the semifinals of the Mercedes Cup in Stuttgart, losing only to Rafael Nadal. Unfortunately, he injured himself in the quarterfinals of Halle and could not finish his match against Andreas Seppi. He was however, able to participate at Wimbledon, defeating Pablo Carreño Busta and Adrian Mannarino before again losing to Gilles Simon in the third round in five sets.

Due to injuries, his performance in America over the next few months was poor and ultimately saw him retire in the middle of his first-round match of the 2015 US Open against Illya Marchenko. He also announced the end of his collaboration with his coach Jan de Witt, who was later replaced by Mikael Tillström.

His last tournament of the year was the Paris Masters. After leading by one set and 4–0, he was knocked out in the first round by compatriot Benoît Paire. He said after the match he got disturbed when the crowd started to whistle at his opponent. In his own words, Monfils defined 2015 as a "year of regrets" where he "regressed, wasted a year because of certain choices".

=== 2016: US Open semifinals, world No. 6 ===
Monfils started the season by entering the 2016 Australian Open where he was seeded 23rd, Monfils took advantage of a draw which opened up in his section to reach the singles quarterfinals of the Australian Open for the first time. There, he lost to the thirteenth seed Milos Raonic in four sets. His good form continued going into the Rotterdam Open, where he reached his first final of 2016, defeating Ernests Gulbis, Borna Ćorić, Alexander Zverev and Philipp Kohlschreiber en route before losing to Martin Kližan in three sets.

In March, Monfils reached the quarterfinals of two ATP World Tour Masters 1000 tournaments – Indian Wells and Miami, losing to Raonic and Kei Nishikori respectively. Monfils then reached a third career ATP World Tour Masters 1000 final and second final of 2016 in Monte Carlo, that of which saw him defeat countryman and world No. 9, Jo-Wilfried Tsonga, in the semifinals en route, before ultimately losing in the final to the eight-time Monte Carlo Masters champion, Rafael Nadal, in three sets. Monfils then looked to again replicate this form at the next two clay-court ATP World Tour Masters 1000 tournaments – the 2016 Madrid Masters and the 2016 Rome Masters. He caught a viral infection during his stay in Madrid and, as a result, ended up losing in the second round to Pablo Cuevas. This viral infection ultimately saw Monfils withdraw from the 2016 French Open as well. Prior to that however, he lost in the first round of the 2016 Rome Masters to Thomaz Bellucci.

Still feeling sick, Monfils would not play again until Wimbledon. In an attempt to recover, he lost his first-round match with compatriot Jérémy Chardy in five sets.

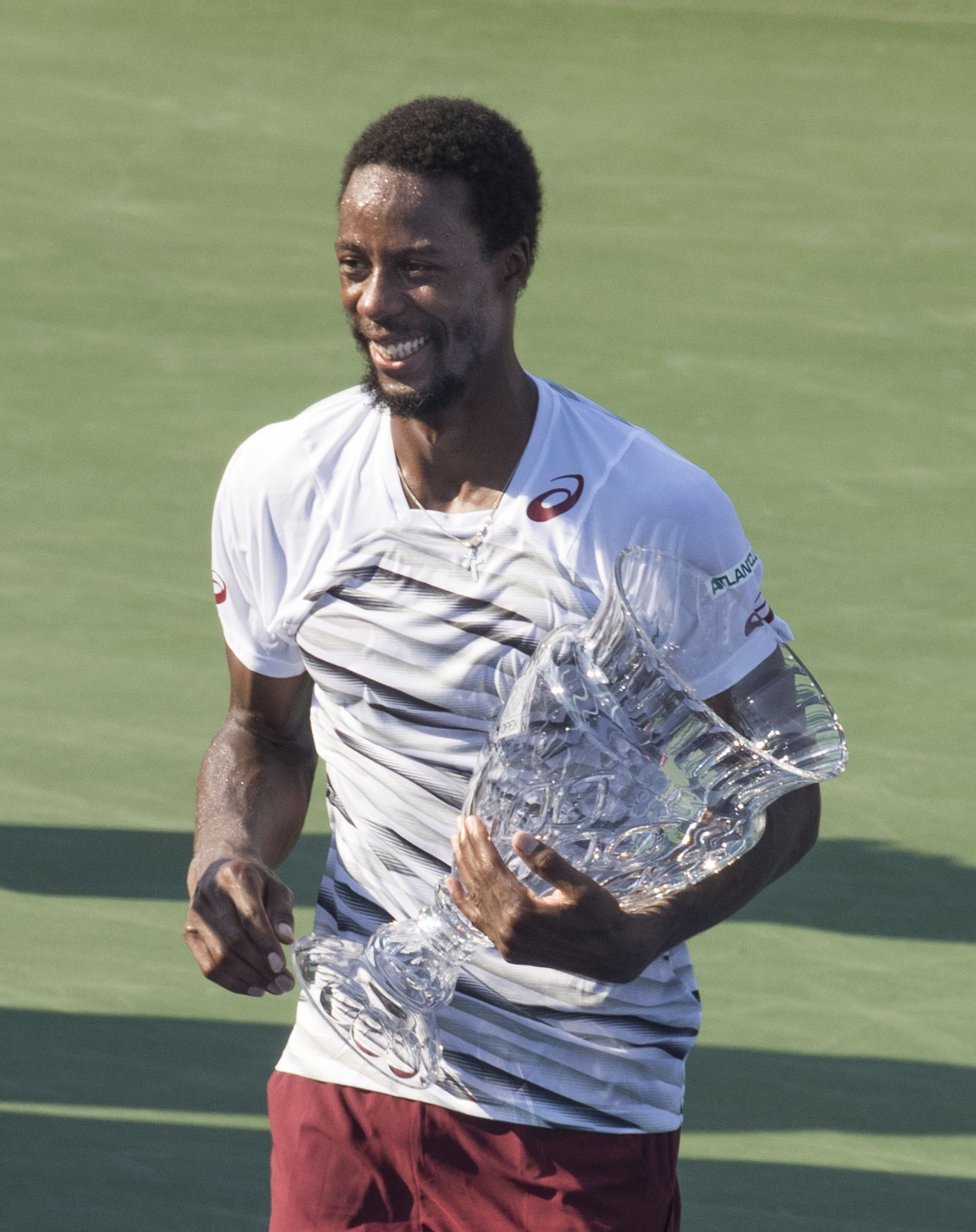
Monfils with the 2016 Washington Open trophy

Monfils earned his first ever ATP World Tour 500 Series singles title in July, in the second week after Wimbledon, defeating Croatian Ivo Karlović in the final in three sets on the hard courts of the Washington Open, after fighting from a set and a break down with Karlović serving for the championship in the second set, and moments later, saving a championship point in the tiebreak. The win was Monfils' first ATP World Tour singles title in over two years, although he had previously reached at least one final every year since 2005. All of his previous ATP World Tour singles titles came under the ATP World Tour 250 Series category, despite the fact that he had already reached at least 3 finals each across all categories, except Grand Slams and Tour Finals.

The following week, Monfils reached the semifinals of the Canadian Masters after dispatching 2016 Wimbledon singles finalist Milos Raonic in the quarterfinals, to set up a match against world No. 1 Novak Djokovic, to whom he lost in straight sets, ending his career-best win streak of 9 consecutive matches.

In the second week of August, since Richard Gasquet withdrew from the 2016 Olympics tennis tournament because of an injury to his back, Monfils would pair up with Jo-Wilfried Tsonga in the men's doubles draw. In the men's singles draw of the same tournament, Monfils reached the quarterfinals and lost to eventual bronze medalist Kei Nishikori, despite having three match point chances in the deciding set.

In late August, Monfils entered the US Open seeded tenth and reached the semifinals without dropping a set, defeating prominent past and present players on the tour Gilles Müller, Jan Šátral, Nicolás Almagro, Marcos Baghdatis and Lucas Pouille en route. He eventually lost a controversial match to Djokovic in four sets. The controversy came due to Monfils soft balling many shots and appearing that he was not giving the match his all. As a result, Monfils was jeered by the crowd and criticized by John McEnroe, who claimed that he was "unprofessional".

In the first week of October, Monfils entered and was seeded second at the 2016 Japan Open, another ATP World Tour 500 Series tournament, where he also reached the semifinals without dropping a set, after again beating Ivo Karlović in the quarterfinals to set up a tie against eventual champion Nick Kyrgios, whom he lost to in two very competitive and entertaining sets. Monfils then entered the Shanghai Masters seeded sixth and received a bye into the second round, where he defeated Kevin Anderson in straight sets. In the third round, he then faced David Goffin. Despite winning the first set and leading by a double break in the second set, he lost the next five games and was forced to play a decider, where he lost 2–6. However, the run guaranteed him to match his career-high ranking of No. 7 once again.

The following week Monfils entered the 2016 Stockholm Open, where he was seeded first. After receiving a first-round bye, he was upset by Gastão Elias in straight sets. The loss resulted in his ranking dropping down one spot, back to No. 8.

Despite missing the penultimate week of the 2016 season, Monfils became the sixth person to qualify for the 2016 ATP World Tour Finals. This year marked his debut at the season-ending event. After falling to Raonic and losing a three-set match to Dominic Thiem, Monfils withdrew from the tournament with an injury. Goffin was brought in to replace Monfils for one match.

=== 2017: 400 career singles wins ===
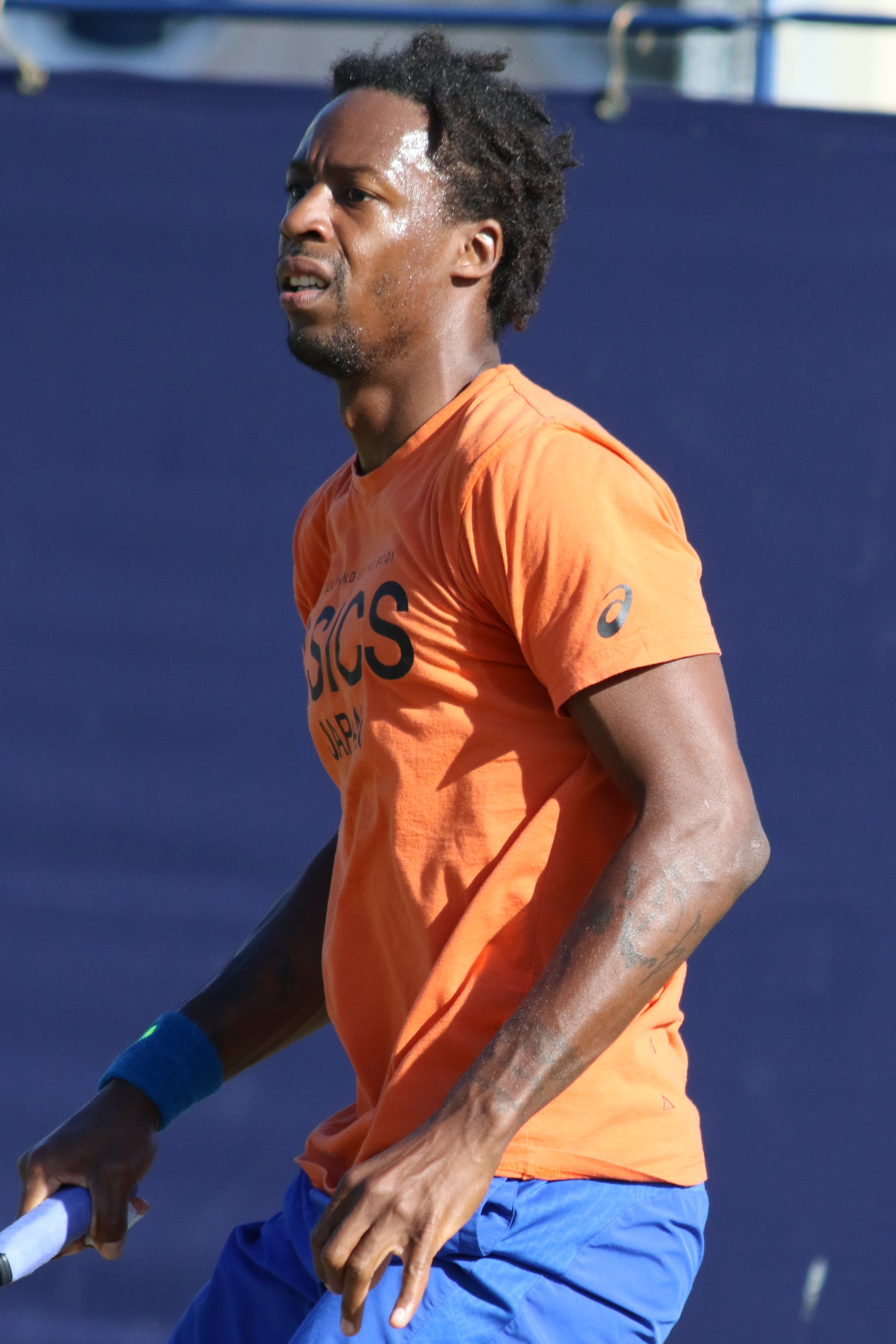
Monfils at the 2017 Eastbourne International

For the whole of 2017, Monfils only managed to progress beyond the round of 16 of the singles main draw in just three ATP World Tour tournaments – the 2017 Open 13 (losing in the quarterfinals to Richard Gasquet), the Dubai Tennis Championships (losing in the quarterfinals to Fernando Verdasco) and the Eastbourne International (losing in the final to Novak Djokovic). In his second round match against fifth seed Kei Nishikori at the Canadian Masters, Monfils saved four match points in the final set tie-break to advance to the third round; he lost his third-round match against No. 12 seed Roberto Bautista Agut in three tight sets, losing the last two on tie-breaks. His victory against Nishikori at the Canadian Masters marked the first time in seven years that Monfils had come from a set down to defeat a Top 10 opponent and it was just the third time in his career (3–62) that he had done so. Monfils saw his year-end position in the ATP singles rankings slip to world No. 46 as he struggled with his fitness in 2017. He was forced to withdraw from six tournaments because of various ailments and concluded his season after losing in the third round of the 2017 US Open, citing a right knee injury.

=== 2018: Wimbledon fourth round ===
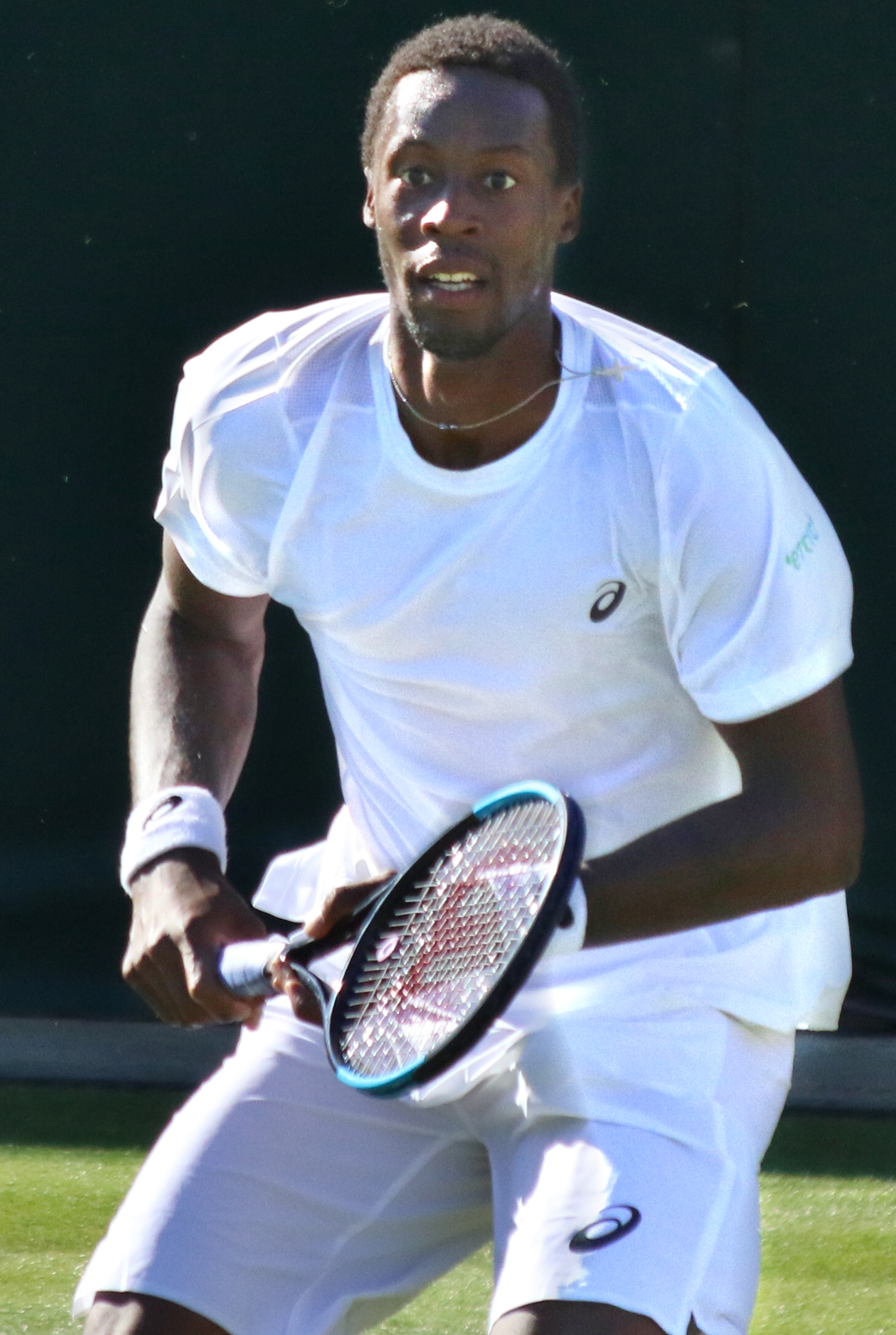
Monfils at the 2018 Wimbledon Championships

Monfils won his seventh ATP World Tour singles title at the Qatar Open. He had lost his previous three Qatar Open singles finals. Appearing in the 2018 edition of the tournament as an unseeded wildcard, he advanced to final via walkover after top seed Dominic Thiem had to withdraw from their match in the semifinals because of illness. In the final, he defeated Andrey Rublev in 61 minutes. In his next tournament, the Australian Open, Monfils lost to the No. 14 seed Novak Djokovic in four sets in the second round. Monfils then made the semifinals of the 2018 Argentina Open, upsetting seventh seed Pablo Cuevas in the first round, before being handily defeated by Dominic Thiem in the semifinals. Continuing his South American swing, Monfils played two stunning matches during the 2018 Rio Open. In round one, Monfils completed a significant comeback to beat Horacio Zeballos, saving one match point in the process with a booming forehand. In round two, the Frenchman pulled off an even bigger stunner, defeating top seed and world No. 3, Marin Čilić, in a match that stretched over two days due to inclement weather. The match was halted at 6–3, 6–6^{(7–7)} in Monfils' favor, a stoppage that surprised many. Monfils lost to Diego Schwartzman, the eventual champion, in the quarterfinals. Later in the year, Monfils finally made the fourth round of Wimbledon for the first time in his career, losing to Kevin Anderson.

=== 2019: Eighth career title, top 10 return ===
At the 2019 Australian Open, Monfils fell in the second round to Taylor Fritz. Monfils won the eighth ATP Tour singles title of his career at the Rotterdam Open, defeating Stan Wawrinka in a three-set final.

At the Madrid Open, the fifteenth seeded Monfils failed to convert two match points when he was leading 6–5 in the third and final set of his third round match against the No. 4 seed Roger Federer; Monfils eventually lost the match.

At the French Open, Monfils lost in the fourth round to Dominic Thiem. At Wimbledon he retired in the first round against countryman Ugo Humbert.

One of the highlights of his year was when he reached the quarterfinals of the US Open as the 13th seed after battling past Denis Shapovalov in the third round and dispatching Pablo Andújar only losing a maximum of two games in each set. He lost in a five-set battle to the 24th seed Matteo Berrettini. Monfils finished the year in the top 10 at world No. 10 since February 2017.

=== 2020: Two titles, loss of form ===
At the 2020 Australian Open, Monfils lost in the fourth round to Dominic Thiem. Monfils won the ninth ATP Tour singles title at the Open Sud de France, defeating Vasek Pospisil in straight sets. Monfils won his second title of the year at the Rotterdam Open, successfully defending his title by defeating Félix Auger-Aliassime in the final. This marked the first time Monfils has won two ATP Tour titles in a season.

At the French Open, Monfils lost in the first round to Alexander Bublik.

=== 2021: Olympics, 500 career wins ===
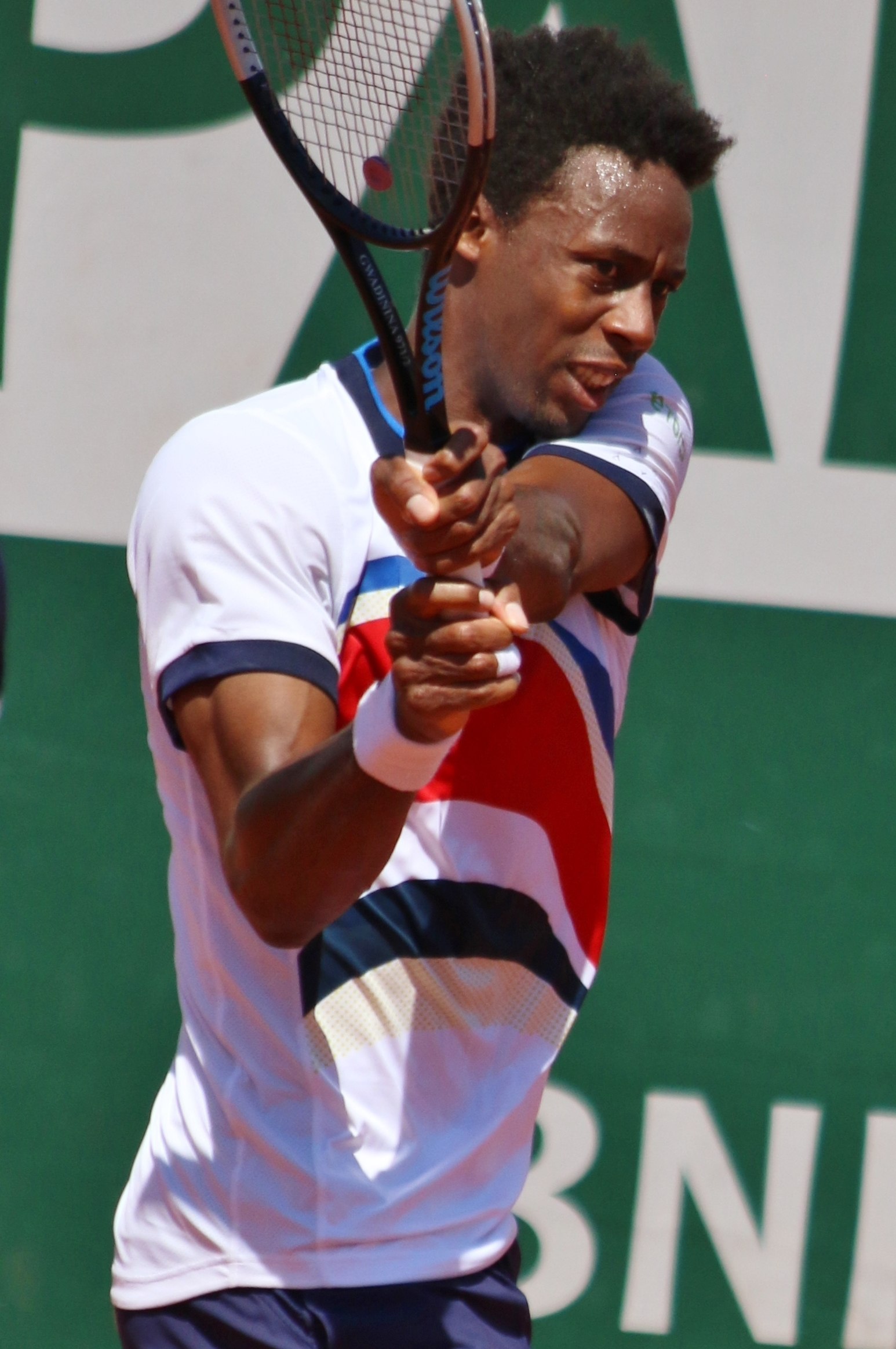
Monfils at the 2021 French Open

Monfils also lost in the first round of the 2021 Australian Open, to Emil Ruusuvuori in five sets. He picked up his first win in over a year in Lyon, beating lucky loser Thiago Seyboth Wild in straight sets. In Belgrade's second tournament, Monfils lost to qualifier Roberto Carballés Baena in a third set tiebreak.

At the French Open, Monfils defeated Albert Ramos-Viñolas in four sets, after saving a set point in the second set tie-break. In the second round, he lost to Mikael Ymer. Following the clay-court season, Monfils quickly turned to the grass. At the 2021 Halle Open, Monfils continued to struggle as he lost in the opening round to Lloyd Harris. Following this, Monfils quickly turned to the next event of the Eastbourne International. He lost in the opening round again, this time to qualifier Max Purcell.

At the Canada Masters 1000, Monfils made his first quarterfinal appearance of the year, after defeating John Millman and Frances Tiafoe. He lost to John Isner in straight sets. In the next Masters at the 2021 Western & Southern Open in Cincinnati, he defeated Alex de Minaur to reach the last 16, and the 500th win in his career on the ATP Tour marking an important milestone. Monfils became the 11th active player to reach 500 singles match wins.

Monfils made his first semifinal of the year at the 2021 Moselle Open. As the third seed, he defeated lucky loser Philipp Kohlschreiber in the second round to reach his second tour-level quarterfinal of the season and eighth seed Nikoloz Basilashvili to make the semifinals. He lost in the semifinals to second seed Pablo Carreño Busta in straight sets. One week later at the 2021 Sofia Open, seeded second, he made his first ATP Tour final in 18 months but lost to top seed and defending champion, Jannik Sinner, in straight sets. He continued his good form, reaching the round of 16 in Indian Wells, Vienna and at home in Paris, where he registered the fastest forehand ever at 190 km/h.

=== 2022: Major quarterfinal, injuries ===
As the top seed, Monfils won his eleventh title at the first Adelaide International tournament without dropping a set, beating Juan Manuel Cerúndolo, sixth seed Tommy Paul, Thanasi Kokkinakis and second seed Karen Khachanov. Monfils pulled out of the second tournament with a neck injury against lucky loser Thiago Monteiro, after being a break down in the third set.

At the Australian Open, Monfils defeated Federico Coria, Alexander Bublik, 16th seed Cristian Garín and Miomir Kecmanović (all in straight sets) to reach his first quarterfinal at the Australian Open since 2016, and first quarterfinal at any major since the 2019 US Open. There, he lost to Matteo Berrettini, in five sets.

After skipping the start of the clay season, Monfils played his first clay tournament of the year at the Madrid Open. Following his Madrid Masters exit, Monfils underwent a heel surgery as he missed the 2022 French Open and the entire grass season. After being out for three months, Monfils returned to action at the Montreal Masters. In his first tournament back following a lengthy absence, Monfils sustained a foot injury in his match against Jack Draper. He ended his season on 31 October 2022.

=== 2023: French record with 356 hardcourt wins ===
Monfils came back from a four months hiatus at the Indian Wells Open in Indian Wells using a protected ranking. He lost to Jordan Thompson in straight sets in the first round. In the next Masters 1000 2023 Miami Open also using a protected ranking, he retired in the first round against compatriot Ugo Humbert. At the French Open, he won his first round match coming from two breaks down in the fifth set over Sebastian Baez to win his first match since his return and at a Major since the Australian Open in January 2022.

He reached the quarterfinals at the Canadian Open defeating Christopher Eubanks, fourth seed Stefanos Tsitsipas and lucky loser Aleksandar Vukic. He lost to seventh seed and eventual champion Jannik Sinner. He made his debut at the 2023 Laver Cup, participating in team Europe using protected ranking.

At the 2023 Stockholm Open he defeated Marton Fucsovics and recorded his 356th hardcourt win over qualifier Filip Misolic, the most of any French player, breaking the record set by Richard Gasquet. In the quarterfinals he defeated compatriot and second seed Adrian Mannarino and in the semifinals Laslo Djere to reach a final for the 19th successive season. He won the title over qualifier and first time ATP finalist Pavel Kotov becoming the oldest champion in the history of the tournament and the 11th player to win the trophy twice, with a 12-year gap between titles being the biggest in history. As a result, he climbed 50 spots in the top 90. He was also the lowest ranked player to ever win this event, and just the fourth above the age of 37 to win an ATP title since 1990, joining Roger Federer, Ivo Karlovic and Feliciano Lopez.

=== 2024: Most major wins for a French player ===
He reached his first semifinal of the season as a wildcard, at the Qatar Open in Doha, defeating Botic van de Zandschulp, Zhang Zhizhen and compatriot and third seed Ugo Humbert becoming the oldest semifinalist at the tournament at 37 years old. As a result, he returned to the top 55 in the rankings. He lost to 18 year old Czech player Jakub Mensik.

At the Masters 1000 Indian Wells Open, he defeated Max Purcell, eighth seed Hubert Hurkacz and 28th seed Cameron Norrie to reach the fourth round. As a result, he moved back to the top 50 in the rankings. At the next Masters, the Miami Open, he reached the third round again defeating 33rd seed Jordan Thompson. It was his 550th win of his career, becoming only the second Frenchman in the Open Era to reach that milestone behind Richard Gasquet (with 600 wins) and the eighth active man (behind Djokovic, Nadal, Murray, Gasquet, Cilic, Wawrinka and Verdasco). It was also his 20th Masters 1000 win after turning 35 years old joining Federer, Karlovic and Isner in sharing the feat (since 1990).

Following a round of 16 showing at the 2024 Estoril Open, he returned to the top 40 in the rankings on 8 April 2024. He recorded his 122nd major win at the French Open, the most of any French player at the major level, with a win over Thiago Seyboth Wild.

Following another round of 16 at the Cincinnati Open, where he defeated world No. 3, Carlos Alcaraz, his first top 5 season win and ninth career top 3 victory, as well as his biggest in more than two years, he again returned to the top 45 in the rankings. At 37 years and 9 months old, he became the fourth oldest man to beat a top 3 player after Ken Rosewall, Jimmy Connors and Roger Federer and second oldest this century, after Federer.

=== 2025: Oldest ATP champion, retirement announcement ===
At 38-years-old, Monfils recorded a straight sets win over ninth seed Jan-Lennard Struff, becoming the oldest quarterfinalist at the 2025 ASB Classic in Auckland since Roger Taylor in 1970. Next, he defeated lucky loser Facundo Diaz Acosta to reach the semifinals, dropping only five points behind his first serve, becoming the oldest semifinalist since 1970. With his 73rd ATP Tour semifinal (second after Novak Djokovic) win over qualifier Nishesh Basavareddy, Monfils became the second-oldest finalist (after Ivo Karlovic in Pune 2019) since the ATP Tour was established in 1990. Monfils defeated qualifier Zizou Bergs, becoming the oldest champion on the ATP Tour and also the oldest-ever men's singles title winner since 43-years-old Ken Rosewall in 1977 in Hong Kong.

Monfils became the only player ever not to face a break point in a five-set match at a Slam (since records started in 1991) when he won against compatriot and 30th seed Giovanni Mpetshi Perricard in the first round at the 2025 Australian Open. The match had three tiebreaks, lasted close to four hours and marked the 21st consecutive season Monfils has won at least one major match. Next, he defeated Daniel Altmaier in straight sets. He then went on to defeat fourth seed Taylor Fritz, for his first top 10 win at a major since 2014, to reach the fourth round. He became the third-oldest player (behind Rosewall twice) to defeat a top-five opponent at a major in the history of the ATP rankings (since 1973) and with Federer the only one to reach the fourth round at age 38 or older since the tournament field expanded to 128 players when it moved to Melbourne Park in 1988.

At the 2025 Miami Open, Monfils became the second oldest player to win a match at the tournament after Jimmy Connors, defeating Fabian Marozsan. He backed that up with a three-set win over 26th seed Jiri Lehecka, saving a match point and Jaume Munar to reach the fourth round becoming the second oldest player to win three matches at the 1000-level after Ivo Karlovic in Indian Wells in 2019.

At the French Open, Monfils won his first round encounter with Hugo Dellien in a five-set thriller, however then lost out to Jack Draper in four sets.

Going into the grass season, Monfils showed poor form as he lost in the first round in Stuttgart and at Queen’s, to Alex Michelsen and Mackenzie McDonald respectively. At Wimbledon, while he recorded a top 20 win over Ugo Humbert in five sets, he lost out to Márton Fucsovics in another five-set thriller in the second round.

Monfils failed to win any matches in North America. At the Washington Open, he lost to Wu Yibing in the first round. He also partnered with Nick Kyrgios in doubles, however they lost out to Édouard Roger-Vasselin & Hugo Nys, the eventual runners up, in straights. He lost to Marcelo Tomas Barrios Vera at the Canadian Open and Roman Safiullin in five sets at the US Open.

He then picked up an injury in his first round encounter at the Chengdu Open with Alexander Shevchenko, and subsequently retired at the beginning of the third set. This brought his 2025 season to an end.

On 1 October 2025, Monfils announced that he would be retiring at the end of the 2026 season.

=== 2026: Final year ===
Monfils began the season defending his title at the 2026 ASB Classic in Auckland, where he lost in 3 sets to Fábián Marozsán in the first round. This pushed his ranking to outside the top 100.

At the Australian Open, Monfils lost to qualifier Dane Sweeny in 4 sets.

In Acapulco, at the Mexican Open, through wildcard entry, Monfils won his first match of the season against Damir Džumhur in straights, however then lost out to 6th seed Valentin Vacherot, again, in straights. In his farewell speech, he thanked Juan Martín del Potro, who was present at the event.

Monfils was given wildcard entry into Indian Wells, describing it as a "huge opportunity". He won his first round against qualifier Alexis Galarneau. Against Auger-Aliassime, Monfils won the first set in a tiebreaker, however proceeded to lose the next two, bringing his Sunshine Double campaign to an end.

Moving into the clay season, Monfils entered Monte Carlo as a wildcard, beating Tallon Griekspoor in 3 sets in the first round, however then losing out in straights to Alexander Bublik. In Madrid, Monfils lost in the first round to Camilo Ugo Carabelli in straights.

== Post-retirement ==
In November 2026, a month after his retirement from playing, Monfils was appointed captain of the French Davis Cup team.

== Playing style ==
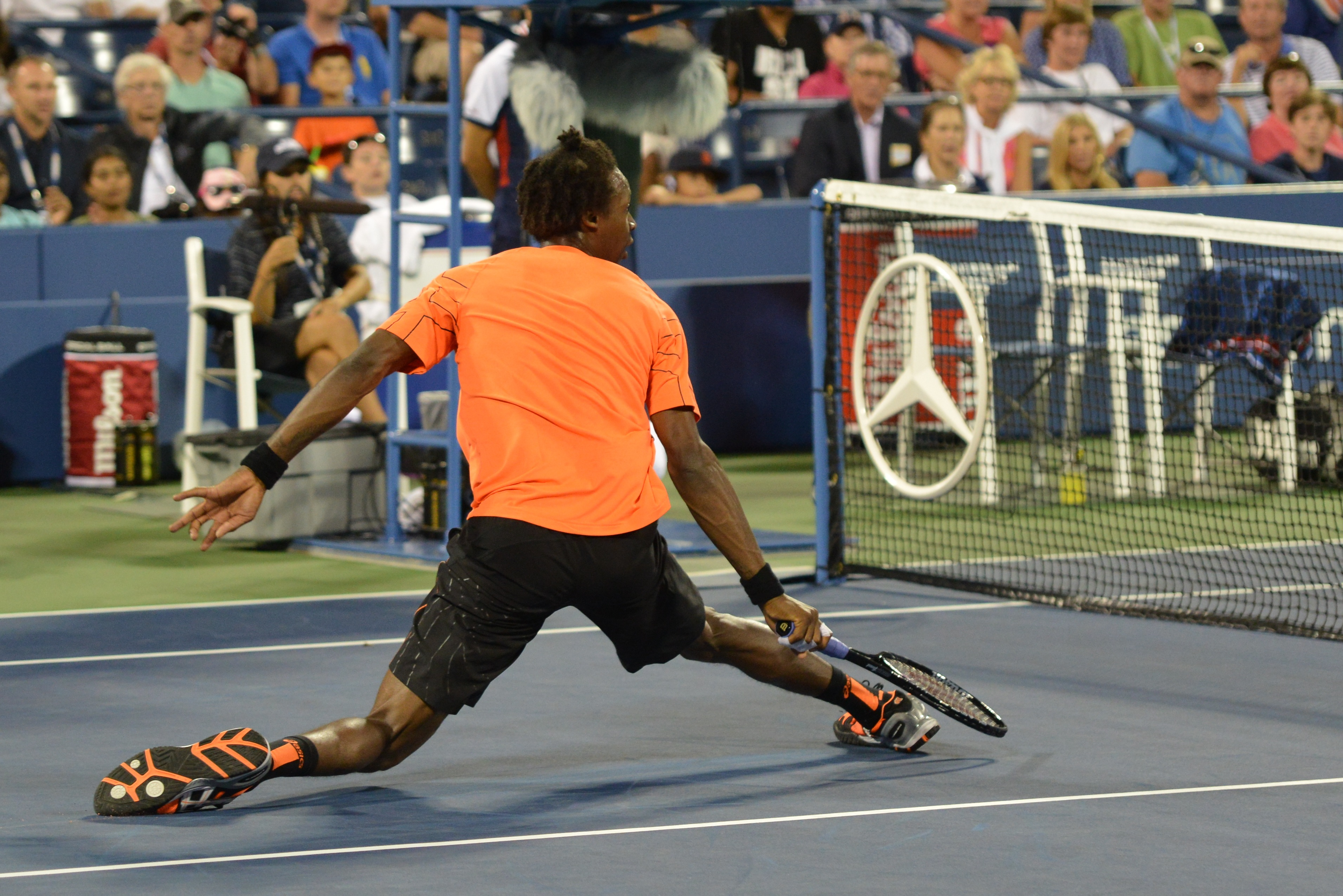
Monfils sliding towards the net at the 2013 US Open

Monfils is usually described as a baseliner who uses placement and consistency to beat his opponents. He is well known for his athleticism and his court coverage, regularly using slides to retrieve balls, even on hard courts. His ability to go from defense to offense quickly can take his opponents by surprise. Monfils occasionally demonstrates that he is capable of generating tremendous pace on his groundstrokes off both wings, especially his forehand that can reach 199 km/h. He has garnered a reputation for showmanship and high-risk shotmaking throughout his career.

Monfils uses a semi-western grip forehand and a combination of continental/semi-western on his backhand. He possesses a strong, accurate serve capable of reaching 230 km/h, although his main focus is on consistency and placement, sometimes at the expense of power.

Monfils was coached by countryman and former ATP pro Thierry Champion (since September 2004) but they parted company in September 2006. Nevertheless, his fitness trainer is still Rémi Barbarin. He announced a partnership with a new coach, Tarik Benhabiles, in May 2007. However, for the 2008 season, Monfils hired Roger Rasheed as his coach. In 2011, Monfils parted ways with Rasheed and announced that his fitness coach, Patrick Chamagne would take the reins as his new full-time coach. That lasted until 2013. As of the 2015 French Open, Monfils shares coach Jan De Witt with fellow countryman Gilles Simon. On 15 November 2012, Monfils split with his coach.

In February 2025, Monfils confirmed that he would quit tennis if he suffered an injury setback in the course of the 2025 season, just after he became the oldest player to win an ATP Tour title in Auckland at age 38 years and four months old.

== Equipment and apparel ==
Monfils was sponsored by Nike for clothes and shoes but changed to K-Swiss in 2010. In 2013 he switched to ASICS for clothes and shoes. He was sponsored by Head for racquets but changed to Prince in 2009 and Wilson in 2012. At the start of the 2022 season, Monfils switched his apparel and racquet sponsors to the French brand Decathlon's tennis line, Artengo. He is now using their TR960 Control Tour racquet.

== Personal life ==
Monfils is nicknamed "La Monf", or occasionally "Sliderman" due to his unusual sliding technique, especially on clay surfaces. He has a younger brother, Daryl, who plays tennis. Gaël and Daryl played doubles together in the 2012 Open Sud de France, losing in the first round.

Monfils was considered an athletic prodigy at school and won the French under-13 and under-14 100m championships. It was only his love for tennis that stopped him from going on to compete at a higher level. His coach is on record as saying that Monfils could have made the Olympic 100m final, such was his talent.

Monfils appeared in the music video for "Hello" by Martin Solveig and Dragonette.

Monfils was married to WTA tennis player Elina Svitolina. They publicly announced their relationship in 2019, their engagement on 3 April 2021, were married on 16 July, and announced their divorce via a joint Instagram post on 19 October 2026. They have a daughter, Skaï.

== Career statistics ==
=== Grand Slam performance timeline ===
Key
W	F	SF	QF	#R	RR	Q#	DNQ	A	NH

(W) winner; (F) finalist; (SF) semifinalist; (QF) quarterfinalist; (#R) rounds 4, 3, 2, 1; (RR) round-robin stage; (Q#) qualification round; (DNQ) did not qualify; (A) absent; (NH) not held; (SR) strike rate (events won / competed); (W–L) win–loss record.
To avoid confusion and double counting, these charts are updated at the conclusion of a tournament or when the player's participation has ended.

Current after the 2026 French Open.

Tournament	2004	2005	2006	2007	2008	2009	2010	2011	2012	2013	2014	2015	2016	2017	2018	2019	2020	2021	2022	2023	2024	2025	2026	SR	W–L	Win %
Australian Open	A	2R	1R	3R	A	4R	3R	3R	3R	3R	3R	2R	QF	4R	2R	2R	4R	1R	QF	A	2R	4R	1R	0 / 20	37–20	65%
French Open	Q1	1R	4R	3R	SF	QF	2R	QF	A	3R	QF	4R	A	4R	3R	4R	1R	2R	A	2R	2R	2R	1R	0 / 19	40–18	69%
Wimbledon	A	3R	1R	3R	A	A	3R	3R	A	A	2R	3R	1R	3R	4R	1R	NH	2R	A	A	3R	2R	A	0 / 14	20–14	59%
US Open	A	1R	2R	A	4R	4R	QF	2R	A	2R	QF	1R	SF	3R	2R	QF	A	3R	A	2R	2R	1R	2R	0 / 18	34–18	66%
Win–loss	0–0	3–4	4–4	6–3	8–2	10–3	9–4	9–4	2–1	5–3	11–4	6–4	9–3	10–4	7–4	8–4	3–2	4–4	4–1	2–1	5–4	5–4	1–3	0 / 71	131–70	65%

=== ATP 1000 tournaments ===
==== Singles: 3 (3 runner-ups) ====
Result	Year	Tournament	Surface	Opponent	Score
Loss	2009	Paris Masters	Hard (i)	(Serbia) Novak Djokovic	2–6, 7–5, 6–7^{(3–7)}
Loss	2010	Paris Masters	Hard (i)	(Sweden) Robin Söderling	1–6, 6–7^{(1–7)}
Loss	2016	Monte-Carlo Masters	Clay	(Spain) Rafael Nadal	5–7, 7–5, 0–6

Awards
Preceded by Florian Mayer	ATP Newcomer of the Year; 2005	Succeeded by Benjamin Becker
Preceded by —	ITF Junior World Champion; 2004	Succeeded by (United States) Donald Young
