= 2000 State Farm Women's Tennis Classic – Singles =

Tennis tournament

Singles
- 2000 State Farm Women's Tennis Classic

Final
- Champion: none
- Runner-up: (United States) Lindsay Davenport and (Switzerland) Martina Hingis
- Score: Cancelled due to rain

Details
- Draw: 28 (3WC/4Q)
- Seeds: 8

Events
Singles	Doubles
State Farm Women's Tennis Classic	· 2001 →

The final match between Lindsay Davenport and Martina Hingis was finally cancelled due to rain. Both players received an equal prize money of US$43,500 for reaching the final.

== Seeds ==
The first four seeds received a bye into the second round.

1. (Switzerland) Martina Hingis (final, suspended)
2. (United States) Lindsay Davenport (final, suspended)
3. (France) Mary Pierce (semifinals)
4. (France) Julie Halard-Decugis (second round)
5. (Spain) Conchita Martínez (first round)
6. (Russia) Anna Kournikova (semifinals)
7. (France) Sandrine Testud (quarterfinals)
8. (Austria) Barbara Schett (second round)

== Draw ==
=== Key ===
- Q = Qualifier
- WC = Wild card
- LL = Lucky loser
- Alt = Alternate
- SE = Special exempt
- PR = Protected ranking
- ITF = ITF entry
- JE = Junior exempt
- w/o = Walkover
- r = Retired
- d = Defaulted
- SR = Special ranking

=== Finals ===
Semifinals
1	(Switzerland) Martina Hingis	6	6
3	(France) Mary Pierce	4	3
6	(Russia) Anna Kournikova	2	2
2	(United States) Lindsay Davenport	6	6

Final
1	(Switzerland) Martina Hingis
2	(United States) Lindsay Davenport	s

=== Top half ===
First round
(United States) C Rubin	6	6
WC	(Zimbabwe) C Black	3	3
(Germany) A Huber	6^{1}	2
(United States) A Frazier	7^{7}	6
(Belgium) D Van Roost	6	3	2
7	(France) S Testud	3	6	6
Q	(Federal Republic of Yugoslavia) S Načuk	6	6
(Slovakia) H Nagyová	2	0
WC	(Croatia) M Lučić	4	4
WC	(United States) M Shaughnessy	6	6
(France) N Dechy	3	6	6
5	(Spain) C Martínez	6	3	4

Second round
1	(Switzerland) M Hingis	6	6
(United States) C Rubin	3	3
(United States) A Frazier	5	0
7	(France) S Testud	7	6
3	(France) M Pierce	6	6
Q	(Federal Republic of Yugoslavia) S Načuk	0	1
WC	(United States) M Shaughnessy	3	6	1
(France) N Dechy	6	4	6

Quarterfinals
1	(Switzerland) M Hingis	6	6
7	(France) S Testud	4	2
3	(France) M Pierce	6	6
(France) N Dechy	3	2

Semifinals
1	(Switzerland) M Hingis	6	6
3	(France) M Pierce	4	3

=== Bottom half ===
First round
6	(Russia) A Kournikova	6	6
Q	(Russia) A Jidkova	2	1
(Russia) E Likhovtseva	3	6	5
Q	(Austria) S Plischke	6	2	7
(United States) L Raymond	2	3
(Japan) A Sugiyama	6	6
8	(Austria) B Schett	6	7
Q	(United States) H Parkinson	4	5
(United States) M Seles	6	7^{7}
(Croatia) S Talaja	1	6^{1}
(United States) J Capriati	6	6
(United States) A Stevenson	3	0

Second round
6	(Russia) A Kournikova	6	6
Q	(Austria) S Plischke	1	1
(Japan) A Sugiyama	6	6
4	(France) J Halard-Decugis	4	2
8	(Austria) B Schett	6^{9}	1
(United States) M Seles	7^{11}	6
(United States) J Capriati	6	2	3
2	(United States) L Davenport	3	6	6

Quarterfinals
6	(Russia) A Kournikova	6	6
(Japan) A Sugiyama	4	2
(United States) M Seles	4	4
2	(United States) L Davenport	6	6

Semifinals
6	(Russia) A Kournikova	2	2
2	(United States) L Davenport	6	6
