= 2011 Roger Federer tennis season =

Statistics for Swiss tennis player

- Calendar prize money: $6,369,576

Singles
- Season record: 64–12
- Calendar titles: 4
- Year-end ranking: No. 3
- Ranking change from previous year: ▼1

Grand Slam & significant results
- Australian Open: SF
- French Open: F
- Wimbledon: QF
- US Open: SF
- Other tournaments
- Tour Finals: W

Doubles
- Season record: 5–2 (71.43%)
- Calendar titles: 0
- Year-end ranking: No. 135
- Ranking change from previous year: ▲192

Davis Cup
- Davis Cup: WG PO (adv. to 2012 WG)
- Last updated on: 12 December 2011.

Roger Federer's 2011 tennis season brought no Major victories but was not entirely unsuccessful. He turned 30 and it marked a decline in his standing in the sport. It was the first year since 2002 that he did not win a major title, and, with the ascendance of Novak Djokovic to world No. 1, his ranking dropped from 2 to 3 behind Rafael Nadal. However, this season had some high points. In the French Open semifinals, Federer defeated Djokovic and ended his 41-match win streak. He ended the year well by winning three straight titles, including a title at the Paris Masters, and he successfully defended his title at the year-end ATP Championships.

== Year summary ==
=== Australian Open and early hard court season ===
Federer began the year ranked as the world no. 2 according to the Association of Tennis Professionals rankings. Federer once again started his year with an exhibition tournament in Abu Dhabi. He beat Robin Söderling in his opening match, before losing to Rafael Nadal in his second match. Federer then got his competitive season underway in Doha. In the first two rounds, Federer beat two qualifiers. The first match was memorable, as Federer pulled off another "tweener", a shot between the legs. Federer defeated Viktor Troicki in the quarterfinals and Jo-Wilfried Tsonga in the semifinals, both in straight sets. Federer then went on to beat Nikolay Davydenko in straight sets for his third title in Doha and the 67th of his career.

At the Australian Open, Federer beat Lukáš Lacko in the first round. In the next round, he faced Gilles Simon. Federer won the first two sets easily, but Simon fought back to win the next two sets, before Federer came back to win the last set, tying up the match. Against Xavier Malisse in the third round, Federer set another record, as he defeated the Belgian in straight sets, surpassing Stefan Edberg's record for the number of matches won at the Australian Open in the open era, winning his 57th Australian Open match. In the fourth round, Federer beat Tommy Robredo and equalled Jimmy Connors' record of 27 consecutive Grand Slam quarterfinals. He defeated Stanislas Wawrinka in the quarterfinal, and in a repeat of the 2008 Australian Open semifinals, Djokovic once again defeated Federer in a tight and exciting match. His loss at the 2011 Australian Open marked the first time that he did not hold a Grand Slam title since his first Grand Slam title at the 2003 Wimbledon Championships.

Next, he participated in the Dubai Tennis Championships, a tournament from which he had been absent for two years. In the first round, he beat Somdev Devvarman, and beat Marcel Granollers in the second round, also in straight sets. In the quarterfinals, he beat Sergiy Stakhovsky, and in the semifinals, he beat Richard Gasquet, successfully reaching his second final of the season without dropping a set. He was then beaten by Novak Djokovic in straight sets.

Federer's next tournament was the Indian Wells Masters in California. He received a bye in the first round and defeated Igor Andreev in the second round. In the third round, he beat Juan Ignacio Chela. In the fourth round, he faced American wildcard Ryan Harrison and won yet again in straight sets. In the quarterfinals, he won over his compatriot and occasional doubles partner Wawrinka. In the semifinals, he once again faced Djokovic, but succumbed to him, losing the match in three sets and losing his no. 2 ranking. Federer also entered the men's doubles draw at Indian Wells, partnering with Wawrinka. In the first round, they defeated second seeds Daniel Nestor and Max Mirnyi in straight sets. In the second round, they faced the French duo of Julien Benneteau and Richard Gasquet and defeated them in a tiebreak. They then defeated Mark Knowles and Michal Mertiňák in the quarterfinals, and defeated defending champions Rafael Nadal and Marc López in the semifinals. In the final, they lost to Alexandr Dolgopolov and Xavier Malisse in three tight sets.

Federer next participated in the Sony Ericsson Open in Miami. He received a bye in the first round and defeated Radek Štěpánek in the second in straight sets. In the third round, he faced Juan Mónaco and won in two tight sets. In the fourth round, Federer beat Olivier Rochus in straight sets. He advanced to the semifinals when Gilles Simon retired at three games down. He went on to face Nadal, but lost in straight sets.

=== Clay court season and French Open ===
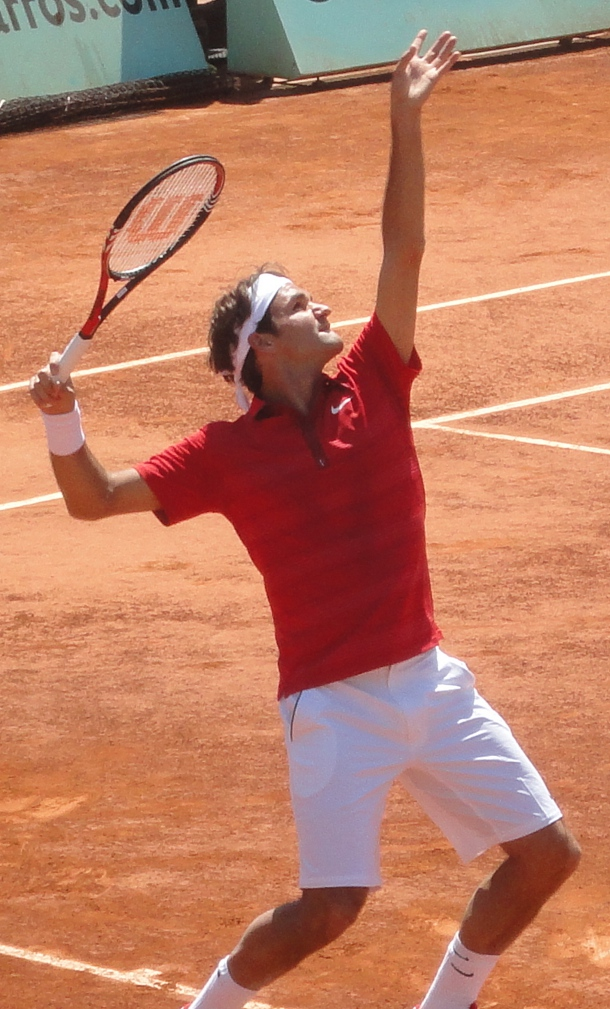
Federer snapped Novak Djokovic's 43 match winning streak in the French Open semifinals, handing the young Serb his first loss of the season.

Federer's first tournament in the 2011 clay-court season was the Monte-Carlo Rolex Masters. After a bye in the first round, he defeated German Philipp Kohlschreiber. He then faced Marin Čilić, whom he defeated. He was then defeated in the quarterfinals by Austrian Jürgen Melzer.

After receiving a bye in the first round at the Madrid Masters, he faced Feliciano López in the second round, narrowly winning in three tight sets. He then beat Xavier Malisse and Robin Söderling without dropping a set, before losing to eventual runner-up Rafael Nadal.

Federer next played in the Rome Masters. He was seeded third behind Nadal and Djokovic and faced Jo-Wilfried Tsonga in the second round, defeating him in straight sets. He next faced Richard Gasquet, but fell to the Frenchman, after losing a deciding third-set tiebreak.

Federer next played in the French Open at Roland Garros, where he opened against Feliciano López in the first round and won in straight sets. He followed up this win with another win in straight sets over wildcard Maxime Teixeira. He then went on to face the 29th seed Janko Tipsarević and dispatched him easily. He then faced compatriot and 14th seed Stanislas Wawrinka and defeated him in straight sets, to stay as one of the few players left in the tournament without a dropped set. He next faced ninth seed and home favorite Gaël Monfils, whom he defeated in straight sets with a tie-break in the third set. Federer faced Djokovic in the semifinals, where he ended Djokovic's perfect 2011 undefeated record in four sets. Federer faced Nadal in the final for a fourth time, but lost to him in four sets.

=== Grass court season and Wimbledon ===
Federer was scheduled to play in the 2011 Gerry Weber Open in Germany, but withdrew, citing a need to rest ahead of Wimbledon. Federer entered Wimbledon as the third seed, his lowest since the 2002 championships. He defeated Mikhail Kukushkin in the first round in straight sets, after Kukushkin brought him to a first-set tiebreak. He then defeated Adrian Mannarino and David Nalbandian in the second and third rounds, respectively, in straight sets. He then faced Mikhail Youzhny. After losing the first-set tiebreak on an unforced error, he recovered in the next three sets to take the match. Federer entered his 29th straight Grand Slam quarterfinal match with a positive record against his opponent, Jo-Wilfried Tsonga. He started strong in the first set, locking up the set in less than half an hour, but Tsonga responded, as the two went to a tiebreak in the second, which Federer won. Tsonga then began to work his way around Federer and broke him down, taking the next three sets by breaking Federer and holding serve. Despite a statistically stunning game (64 winners to just 11 unforced errors), Federer simply could not respond and lost a close match in five sets, making this the first time in the season that Federer did not make a Grand Slam semifinal. It was also the first time in 179 matches (and only the third time overall) that Federer lost a match after winning the first two sets.

=== US Open Series and US Open ===
To open the US Open Series, Federer participated in the Rogers Cup in Montreal, where he had finished as runner-up the previous year to Andy Murray. He moved through to the third round after defeating wildcard Vasek Pospisil in straight sets. In the third round, he lost his second consecutive match to Tsonga (the first being in the quarterfinals of Wimbledon). Federer battled with Tsonga in the first set to a tiebreak, which Tsonga won. He then recovered by winning the second set and leveling the match at one set all, but Tsonga broke him down quickly in the third set to clinch a spot in the quarterfinals. He consequently held a slim 4–3 head-to-head count against Tsonga, after losing their last two meetings. His early exit from the tournament left Novak Djokovic, the eventual champion, as the sole Big Four player left in the main draw, as Murray and Nadal were both upset in the second round by unseeded players.

Federer entered the Cincinnati Masters as the defending champion, winning the title last year over Mardy Fish. In the second round, he faced Juan Martín del Potro, a player who won his last two meetings against Federer at the 2009 US Open final and the 2009 ATP World Tour Finals. Federer defeated del Potro in a highly anticipated match. He then defeated James Blake, who had defeated him in the quarterfinals of the 2008 Summer Olympics, in the next round. He faced Tomáš Berdych, who had defeated him in the quarterfinals of the 2010 Wimbledon Championships and had won two out of their last three meetings, in the quarterfinals. After a shaky start and a plethora of unforced errors, Federer lost the match, hence failing to defend his title.

Federer next participated in the 2011 US Open, where he finished last year as a semifinalist after a momentous loss to Djokovic. He started off in the first round with a win against Santiago Giraldo, then breezed past Dudi Sela in straight sets. He next faced 27th-seeded Marin Čilić. After winning the first set and dropping the second after Čilić took a break in the otherwise tight set, Federer cruised through the remainder of the match and defeated Čilić. He cruised past Argentine Juan Mónaco in a late-night match in straight sets, dropping only three games during his victory. He was set up to meet Jo-Wilfried Tsonga, against whom he had lost their previous two encounters. Federer went through the first two sets rather smoothly and held a resurgent Tsonga at bay in the third, defeating him in straight sets. He played Novak Djokovic in the semifinals in a rematch of their Roland Garros semifinal match, where Federer had snapped Djokovic's 43-match winning streak and perfect season start. Federer started strong, winning the first two very close sets in dramatic fashion, but began to show small cracks in his game and lost the next two sets. Both players traded excellent points and service games in those sets. In the deciding set, both Federer and Djokovic held serve until Federer managed to break Djokovic and serve for the match. Despite holding two match points, Federer, in a repeat of last year's US Open match, failed to convert on those match points and Djokovic broke back. As a result, Djokovic gained momentum and won four games in a row to defeat Federer in a very close match. Federer recorded his fourth season loss to Djokovic, losing yet another opportunity to win his first major since the 2010 Australian Open. His loss to Djokovic also marked the second time that season and in his career that he lost a match after winning the first two sets.

=== European Indoor Season ===
Federer pulled out of the 2011 Shanghai Masters, citing nagging injuries. As a result, he lost 600 ranking points, which contributed to his drop from world no. 3 to no. 4. This marked the first time that he was outside of the top 3 since the 2003 Wimbledon Championships.

Federer's next tournament was the Swiss Indoors Basel, which opened nearly one and a half months after his last major tournament at the Davis Cup and two months after his last ATP tournament, the US Open. As the defending champion and the world no. 4, Federer was seeded third behind Djokovic and Murray, and faced Italian Potito Starace. After a shaky start, he defeated Starace in straight sets. He then faced Jarkko Nieminen, who was fresh off a victory over Thomaz Bellucci. Federer blew through the first set, but a few mistakes in the second allowed Nieminen to take the set, bringing it to a tiebreak set. Federer eventually closed the match out with a tally. He then played against Andy Roddick, against whom he has a prolific rivalry, and routed him quickly in a win. In the semifinals, he met Wawrinka for the fourth time in the season. Wawrinka brought Federer to a first-set tiebreak, but Federer won the tiebreak and then took the second set to win the match. Federer played Kei Nishikori in his eighth Basel final, after Nishikori upset the no. 1 seed Djokovic in the semifinals. Federer pulled a quick victory over Nishikori to claim his second consecutive title, his fifth title at Basel, and his second title of the year.

After Basel, Federer won the BNP Paribas Masters in Paris for the first time in his career. He opened up against Frenchman Adrian Mannarino and finished the match in under an hour, winning in straight sets. He next played against Frenchman Richard Gasquet, whom he played last in the Rome Masters, and made short work of him as well. Federer then faced Juan Mónaco, whom he had met at the US Open, in the quarterfinals. After a tight second set, he sealed the match, marking his 800th career match. He next faced Tomáš Berdych in the semifinals, and avenged his loss in Cincinnati with a win in 80 minutes. His win over Berdych made him the first man in the Open Era to reach the final of each of the nine Masters 1000 tournaments. He recorded a straight sets win in 86 minutes over hometown favourite Tsonga in the final to claim his first Paris Masters 1000 trophy. It was his fourth season win over Tsonga, his third title of the year and his second title in two weeks. With his straight sets win, he became the fourth person in history to finish the Paris Masters without dropping a set.

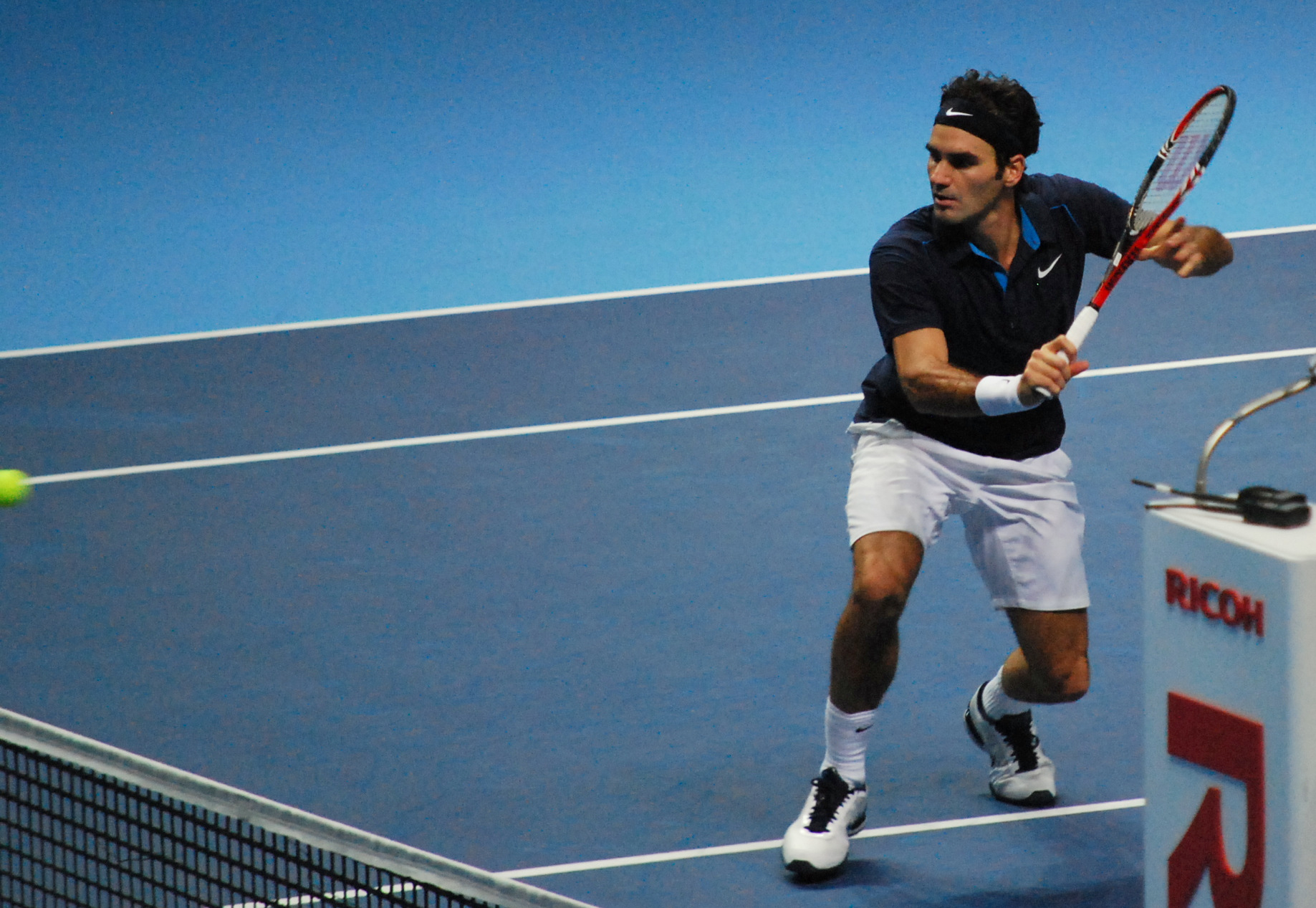
Federer captured a record shattering sixth Year-End Championship.

Federer finished the ATP season by participating in the 2011 ATP World Tour Finals. He was the fourth player to qualify to the Finals this year, and has qualified for the tenth time. He was drawn into Group B, which included Tsonga, debutant Mardy Fish, and arch-rival Rafael Nadal. In his opening round robin match against Tsonga, Federer opened the match with a quick first set. Tsonga came back to life in the second set and evened things out by winning the second set, forcing a deciding set. Federer, who had never won a deciding third set against Tsonga, found a break opportunity late in the set and converted it to win his seventh season match against Tsonga with a score. In his next match against Nadal, Federer won 10 of the last 11 games in the match to rout him in exactly one hour, securing his spot in the semifinals in his 26th meeting with Nadal. Federer therefore brought his win–loss record against Nadal to 9–17 and his indoor record against Nadal to 4–0. In his final round robin match, Federer played Fish for the first time in the season. He defeated Fish after dropping the second set. Federer faced the runner-up from Group B, David Ferrer, and defeated him soundly in a straight sets win. Federer advanced to his 100th career final with his win over Ferrer. In the final, he played Tsonga for the eighth time this season in their second consecutive final. After skating past Tsonga with a break in the first set, he was unable to serve out the match in the second, giving up a break to Tsonga. He then held match point at, but Tsonga saved it with a forehand winner and brought the match to a tiebreak. Federer held a slight lead late in the tiebreak, but ended up dropping the set due to backhand errors. Federer then rebounded by picked up a break in the deciding set and wrapped up the match with a tally, claiming his 70th career title and a record 6th ATP World Tour Finals title. He finished the season with a 17-match win streak, which includes three titles won in a matter of four weeks.

=== Davis Cup ===
Federer participated in the Davis Cup Europe/Africa Zone Group I Portugal vs. Switzerland match-up in Bern, where he and Wawrinka teamed up to qualify Switzerland for the World Group Playoffs by sweeping Portugal, 5–0. Federer first played Rui Machado in a singles draw. After dropping the first set, he won the next three to bring Switzerland's score to 2–0. He then teamed up with Wawrinka, also his gold medal-winning doubles partner at the 2008 Summer Olympics, to defeat Frederico Gil and Leonardo Tavares in straight sets, sealing a victory for Switzerland. His final match was scheduled to be a dead rubber against Frederico Gil, but the schedule was changed so that he would not have to play.

Federer led the Swiss team to the World Group play-offs Australia vs. Switzerland match-up in Sydney. Switzerland entered the match-up with an 0–4 win–loss record versus the Australians. Federer played Lleyton Hewitt in the second rubber, following Wawrinka's surprising loss to Bernard Tomic. Federer dropped the first set, after Hewitt capitalized on the only break of serve in the set, but Federer regained momentum after winning a second-set tiebreak and finished the match strong, levelling the match-up score at 1–1. In the doubles rubber, Federer and Wawrinka faced off against Hewitt and Chris Guccione and started off strong with a first-set win. However, in a surprise upset, Hewitt and Guccione ran away with the match, gaining momentum after winning the second set on a contested break point that was won by the Australians earlier in the set. Federer dropped to 11–6 in Davis Cup doubles with the loss to Hewitt and Guccione. Federer played Bernard Tomic in the fourth rubber, which might have decided the match-up in favor of the Australians. Federer jumped out to a two-set lead after a closely fought second set, but Tomic took the third set to extend the match to four sets. Federer eventually prevailed, levelling the match-up at 2–2. The deciding rubber between Wawrinka and Hewitt, played to five sets and over four hours, decided the matchup in favor of the Swiss, and Switzerland advanced to the 2012 Davis Cup World Group.

== All matches ==
=== Singles matches ===
Tournament	Match	Round	Opponent	Rank	Result	Score
Qatar ExxonMobil Open; Doha, Qatar; ATP 250; Hard, outdoor January 3, 2011	918	1R	(Netherlands) Thomas Schoorel	168	Win	7–6^{(7–3)}, 6–3
Qatar ExxonMobil Open; Doha, Qatar; ATP 250; Hard, outdoor January 3, 2011	919	2R	(Switzerland) Marco Chiudinelli	117	Win	7–6^{(7–5)}, 7–5
Qatar ExxonMobil Open; Doha, Qatar; ATP 250; Hard, outdoor January 3, 2011	920	QF	(Serbia) Viktor Troicki	28	Win	6–2, 6–2
Qatar ExxonMobil Open; Doha, Qatar; ATP 250; Hard, outdoor January 3, 2011	921	SF	(France) Jo-Wilfried Tsonga	13	Win	6–3, 7–6^{(7–2)}
Qatar ExxonMobil Open; Doha, Qatar; ATP 250; Hard, outdoor January 3, 2011	922	F	(Russia) Nikolay Davydenko	22	Win (1)	6–3, 6–4
Australian Open; Melbourne, Australia; Grand Slam; Hard, outdoor January 16, 2011	923	1R	(Slovakia) Lukáš Lacko	97	Win	6–1, 6–1, 6–3
Australian Open; Melbourne, Australia; Grand Slam; Hard, outdoor January 16, 2011	924	2R	(France) Gilles Simon	34	Win	6–2, 6–3, 4–6, 4–6, 6–3
Australian Open; Melbourne, Australia; Grand Slam; Hard, outdoor January 16, 2011	925	3R	(Belgium) Xavier Malisse	45	Win	6–3, 6–3, 6–1
Australian Open; Melbourne, Australia; Grand Slam; Hard, outdoor January 16, 2011	926	4R	(Spain) Tommy Robredo	52	Win	6–3, 3–6, 6–3, 6–2
Australian Open; Melbourne, Australia; Grand Slam; Hard, outdoor January 16, 2011	927	QF	(Switzerland) Stanislas Wawrinka	19	Win	6–1, 6–3, 6–3
Australian Open; Melbourne, Australia; Grand Slam; Hard, outdoor January 16, 2011	928	SF	(Serbia) Novak Djokovic	3	Loss	6–7^{(3–7)}, 5–7, 4–6
Dubai Tennis Championships; Dubai, United Arab Emirates; ATP 500; Hard, outdoor February 21, 2011	929	1R	(India) Somdev Devvarman	79	Win	6–3, 6–3
Dubai Tennis Championships; Dubai, United Arab Emirates; ATP 500; Hard, outdoor February 21, 2011	930	2R	(Spain) Marcel Granollers	53	Win	6–3, 6–4
Dubai Tennis Championships; Dubai, United Arab Emirates; ATP 500; Hard, outdoor February 21, 2011	931	QF	(Ukraine) Sergiy Stakhovsky	43	Win	6–3, 6–4
Dubai Tennis Championships; Dubai, United Arab Emirates; ATP 500; Hard, outdoor February 21, 2011	932	SF	(France) Richard Gasquet	28	Win	6–2, 7–5
Dubai Tennis Championships; Dubai, United Arab Emirates; ATP 500; Hard, outdoor February 21, 2011	933	F	(Serbia) Novak Djokovic	3	Loss (1)	3–6, 3–6
BNP Paribas Open; Indian Wells, California, USA; ATP 1000; Hard, outdoor March 8, 2011	–	1R	Bye			
BNP Paribas Open; Indian Wells, California, USA; ATP 1000; Hard, outdoor March 8, 2011	934	2R	(Russia) Igor Andreev	96	Win	7–5, 7–6^{(7–4)}
BNP Paribas Open; Indian Wells, California, USA; ATP 1000; Hard, outdoor March 8, 2011	935	3R	(Argentina) Juan Ignacio Chela	32	Win	6–0, 6–2
BNP Paribas Open; Indian Wells, California, USA; ATP 1000; Hard, outdoor March 8, 2011	936	4R	(United States) Ryan Harrison	152	Win	7–6^{(7–4)}, 6–3
BNP Paribas Open; Indian Wells, California, USA; ATP 1000; Hard, outdoor March 8, 2011	937	QF	(Switzerland) Stanislas Wawrinka	14	Win	6–3, 6–4
BNP Paribas Open; Indian Wells, California, USA; ATP 1000; Hard, outdoor March 8, 2011	938	SF	(Serbia) Novak Djokovic	3	Loss	3–6, 6–3, 2–6
Sony Ericsson Open; Miami, Florida, USA; ATP 1000; Hard, outdoor March 23, 2011	–	1R	Bye			
Sony Ericsson Open; Miami, Florida, USA; ATP 1000; Hard, outdoor March 23, 2011	939	2R	(Czech Republic) Radek Štěpánek	68	Win	6–3, 6–3
Sony Ericsson Open; Miami, Florida, USA; ATP 1000; Hard, outdoor March 23, 2011	940	3R	(Argentina) Juan Mónaco	35	Win	7–6^{(7–4)}, 6–4
Sony Ericsson Open; Miami, Florida, USA; ATP 1000; Hard, outdoor March 23, 2011	941	4R	(Belgium) Olivier Rochus	89	Win	6–3, 6–1
Sony Ericsson Open; Miami, Florida, USA; ATP 1000; Hard, outdoor March 23, 2011	942	QF	(France) Gilles Simon	25	Win	3–0, RET
Sony Ericsson Open; Miami, Florida, USA; ATP 1000; Hard, outdoor March 23, 2011	943	SF	(Spain) Rafael Nadal	1	Loss	3–6, 2–6
Monte-Carlo Rolex Masters; Monte-Carlo, Monaco; ATP 1000; Clay, outdoor April 10, 2011	–	1R	Bye			
Monte-Carlo Rolex Masters; Monte-Carlo, Monaco; ATP 1000; Clay, outdoor April 10, 2011	944	2R	(Germany) Philipp Kohlschreiber	32	Win	6–2, 6–1
Monte-Carlo Rolex Masters; Monte-Carlo, Monaco; ATP 1000; Clay, outdoor April 10, 2011	945	3R	(Croatia) Marin Čilić	22	Win	6–4, 6–3
Monte-Carlo Rolex Masters; Monte-Carlo, Monaco; ATP 1000; Clay, outdoor April 10, 2011	946	QF	(Austria) Jürgen Melzer	9	Loss	4–6, 4–6
Mutua Madrileña Madrid Open; Madrid, Spain; ATP 1000; Clay, outdoor May 1, 2011	–	1R	Bye			
Mutua Madrileña Madrid Open; Madrid, Spain; ATP 1000; Clay, outdoor May 1, 2011	947	2R	(Spain) Feliciano López	39	Win	7–6^{(15–13)}, 6–7^{(1–7)}, 7–6^{(9–7)}
Mutua Madrileña Madrid Open; Madrid, Spain; ATP 1000; Clay, outdoor May 1, 2011	948	3R	(Belgium) Xavier Malisse	49	Win	6–4, 6–3
Mutua Madrileña Madrid Open; Madrid, Spain; ATP 1000; Clay, outdoor May 1, 2011	949	QF	(Sweden) Robin Söderling	5	Win	7–6^{(7–2)}, 6–4
Mutua Madrileña Madrid Open; Madrid, Spain; ATP 1000; Clay, outdoor May 1, 2011	950	SF	(Spain) Rafael Nadal	1	Loss	7–5, 1–6, 3–6
Internazionali BNL d'Italia; Rome, Italy; ATP 1000; Clay, outdoor May 8, 2011	–	1R	Bye			
Internazionali BNL d'Italia; Rome, Italy; ATP 1000; Clay, outdoor May 8, 2011	951	2R	(France) Jo-Wilfried Tsonga	18	Win	6–4, 6–2
Internazionali BNL d'Italia; Rome, Italy; ATP 1000; Clay, outdoor May 8, 2011	952	3R	(France) Richard Gasquet	16	Loss	6–4, 6–7^{(2–7)}, 6–7^{(4–7)}
French Open; Paris, France; Grand Slam; Clay, outdoor May 17, 2011	953	1R	(Spain) Feliciano López	41	Win	6–3, 6–4, 7–6^{(7–3)}
French Open; Paris, France; Grand Slam; Clay, outdoor May 17, 2011	954	2R	(France) Maxime Teixeira	181	Win	6–3, 6–0, 6–2
French Open; Paris, France; Grand Slam; Clay, outdoor May 17, 2011	955	3R	(Serbia) Janko Tipsarević	32	Win	6–1, 6–4, 6–3
French Open; Paris, France; Grand Slam; Clay, outdoor May 17, 2011	956	4R	(Switzerland) Stanislas Wawrinka	14	Win	6–3, 6–2, 7–5
French Open; Paris, France; Grand Slam; Clay, outdoor May 17, 2011	957	QF	(France) Gaël Monfils	9	Win	6–4, 6–3, 7–6^{(7–3)}
French Open; Paris, France; Grand Slam; Clay, outdoor May 17, 2011	958	SF	(Serbia) Novak Djokovic	2	Win	7–6^{(7–5)}, 6–3, 3–6, 7–6^{(7–5)}
French Open; Paris, France; Grand Slam; Clay, outdoor May 17, 2011	959	F	(Spain) Rafael Nadal	1	Loss (2)	5–7, 6–7^{(3–7)}, 7–5, 1–6
Wimbledon Championships; London, Great Britain; Grand Slam; Grass, outdoor June 20, 2011	960	1R	(Kazakhstan) Mikhail Kukushkin	61	Win	7–6^{(7–4)}, 6–4, 6–2
Wimbledon Championships; London, Great Britain; Grand Slam; Grass, outdoor June 20, 2011	961	2R	(France) Adrian Mannarino	55	Win	6–2, 6–3, 6–2
Wimbledon Championships; London, Great Britain; Grand Slam; Grass, outdoor June 20, 2011	962	3R	(Argentina) David Nalbandian	23	Win	6–4, 6–2, 6–4
Wimbledon Championships; London, Great Britain; Grand Slam; Grass, outdoor June 20, 2011	963	4R	(Russia) Mikhail Youzhny	17	Win	6–7^{(5–7)}, 6–3, 6–3, 6–3
Wimbledon Championships; London, Great Britain; Grand Slam; Grass, outdoor June 20, 2011	964	QF	(France) Jo-Wilfried Tsonga	19	Loss	6–3, 7–6^{(7–3)}, 4–6, 4–6, 4–6
Davis Cup Europe/Africa Zone Group I, Second Round; Portugal vs. Switzerland; Bern, Switzerland; Davis Cup; Hard, indoor July 8, 2011	965	RR	(Portugal) Rui Machado	93	Win	5–7, 6–3, 6–4, 6–2
Rogers Cup; Montreal, Canada; ATP 1000; Hard, outdoor August 8, 2011	–	1R	Bye			
Rogers Cup; Montreal, Canada; ATP 1000; Hard, outdoor August 8, 2011	966	2R	(Canada) Vasek Pospisil	155	Win	7–5, 6–3
Rogers Cup; Montreal, Canada; ATP 1000; Hard, outdoor August 8, 2011	967	3R	(France) Jo-Wilfried Tsonga	16	Loss	6–7^{(3–7)}, 6–4, 1–6
Western & Southern Financial Group Masters; Cincinnati, United States; ATP 1000; Hard, outdoor August 15, 2011	–	1R	Bye			
Western & Southern Financial Group Masters; Cincinnati, United States; ATP 1000; Hard, outdoor August 15, 2011	968	2R	(Argentina) Juan Martín del Potro	19	Win	6–3, 7–5
Western & Southern Financial Group Masters; Cincinnati, United States; ATP 1000; Hard, outdoor August 15, 2011	969	3R	(United States) James Blake	84	Win	6–4, 6–1
Western & Southern Financial Group Masters; Cincinnati, United States; ATP 1000; Hard, outdoor August 15, 2011	970	QF	(Czech Republic) Tomáš Berdych	9	Loss	2–6, 6–7^{(3–7)}
US Open; New York City, United States; Grand Slam; Hard, outdoor August 29, 2011	971	1R	(Colombia) Santiago Giraldo	54	Win	6–4, 6–3, 6–2
US Open; New York City, United States; Grand Slam; Hard, outdoor August 29, 2011	972	2R	(Israel) Dudi Sela	93	Win	6–3, 6–2, 6–2
US Open; New York City, United States; Grand Slam; Hard, outdoor August 29, 2011	973	3R	(Croatia) Marin Čilić	28	Win	6–3, 4–6, 6–4, 6–2
US Open; New York City, United States; Grand Slam; Hard, outdoor August 29, 2011	974	4R	(Argentina) Juan Mónaco	36	Win	6–1, 6–2, 6–0
US Open; New York City, United States; Grand Slam; Hard, outdoor August 29, 2011	975	QF	(France) Jo-Wilfried Tsonga	11	Win	6–4, 6–3, 6–3
US Open; New York City, United States; Grand Slam; Hard, outdoor August 29, 2011	976	SF	(Serbia) Novak Djokovic	1	Loss	7–6^{(9–7)}, 6–4, 3–6, 2–6, 5–7
Davis Cup World Group play-offs Australia vs. Switzerland; Sydney, Australia; Davis Cup; Grass, outdoor September 16, 2011	977	RR	(Australia) Lleyton Hewitt	199	Win	5–7, 7–6^{(7–5)}, 6–2, 6–3
Davis Cup World Group play-offs Australia vs. Switzerland; Sydney, Australia; Davis Cup; Grass, outdoor September 16, 2011	978	RR	(Australia) Bernard Tomic	59	Win	6–2, 7–5, 3–6, 6–3
Swiss Indoors Basel; Basel, Switzerland; ATP 500; Hard, indoor October 30, 2011	979	1R	(Italy) Potito Starace	54	Win	7–6^{(7–3)}, 6–4
Swiss Indoors Basel; Basel, Switzerland; ATP 500; Hard, indoor October 30, 2011	980	2R	(Finland) Jarkko Nieminen	66	Win	6–1, 4–6, 6–3
Swiss Indoors Basel; Basel, Switzerland; ATP 500; Hard, indoor October 30, 2011	981	QF	(United States) Andy Roddick	15	Win	6–3, 6–2
Swiss Indoors Basel; Basel, Switzerland; ATP 500; Hard, indoor October 30, 2011	982	SF	(Switzerland) Stanislas Wawrinka	19	Win	7–6^{(7–5)}, 6–2
Swiss Indoors Basel; Basel, Switzerland; ATP 500; Hard, indoor October 30, 2011	983	F	(Japan) Kei Nishikori	32	Win (2)	6–1, 6–3
BNP Paribas Masters; Paris, France; ATP 1000; Hard, indoor November 7, 2011	–	1R	Bye			
BNP Paribas Masters; Paris, France; ATP 1000; Hard, indoor November 7, 2011	984	2R	(France) Adrian Mannarino	85	Win	6–2, 6–3
BNP Paribas Masters; Paris, France; ATP 1000; Hard, indoor November 7, 2011	985	3R	(France) Richard Gasquet	16	Win	6–2, 6–4
BNP Paribas Masters; Paris, France; ATP 1000; Hard, indoor November 7, 2011	986	QF	(Argentina) Juan Mónaco	34	Win	6–3, 7–5
BNP Paribas Masters; Paris, France; ATP 1000; Hard, indoor November 7, 2011	987	SF	(Czech Republic) Tomáš Berdych	7	Win	6–4, 6–3
BNP Paribas Masters; Paris, France; ATP 1000; Hard, indoor November 7, 2011	988	F	(France) Jo-Wilfried Tsonga	8	Win (3)	6–1, 7–6^{(7–3)}
ATP World Tour Finals; London, England; Year-end Championships; Hard, indoor November 20, 2011	989	RR	(France) Jo-Wilfried Tsonga	6	Win	6–2, 2–6, 6–4
ATP World Tour Finals; London, England; Year-end Championships; Hard, indoor November 20, 2011	990	RR	(Spain) Rafael Nadal	2	Win	6–3, 6–0
ATP World Tour Finals; London, England; Year-end Championships; Hard, indoor November 20, 2011	991	RR	(United States) Mardy Fish	8	Win	6–1, 3–6, 6–3
ATP World Tour Finals; London, England; Year-end Championships; Hard, indoor November 20, 2011	992	SF	(Spain) David Ferrer	5	Win	7–5, 6–3
ATP World Tour Finals; London, England; Year-end Championships; Hard, indoor November 20, 2011	993	F	(France) Jo-Wilfried Tsonga	6	Win (4)	6–3, 6–7^{(6–8)}, 6–3

=== Doubles matches ===
Tournament	Match	Round	Partner	Opponent/Rank	Result	Score
BNP Paribas Open; Indian Wells, California, USA; ATP 1000; Hard, outdoor March 8, 2011	190	1R	(Switzerland) Stanislas Wawrinka	(Canada) Daniel Nestor / #3 (Belarus) Max Mirnyi / #6	Win	6–1, 6–2
BNP Paribas Open; Indian Wells, California, USA; ATP 1000; Hard, outdoor March 8, 2011	191	2R	(Switzerland) Stanislas Wawrinka	(France) Julien Benneteau / #39 (France) Richard Gasquet / #368	Win	6–3, 4–6, [12–10]
BNP Paribas Open; Indian Wells, California, USA; ATP 1000; Hard, outdoor March 8, 2011	192	QF	(Switzerland) Stanislas Wawrinka	(The Bahamas) Mark Knowles / #27 (Slovakia) Michal Mertiňák / #25	Win	6–1, 7–5
BNP Paribas Open; Indian Wells, California, USA; ATP 1000; Hard, outdoor March 8, 2011	193	SF	(Switzerland) Stanislas Wawrinka	(Spain) Marc López / #14 (Spain) Rafael Nadal / #58	Win	7–5, 6–3
BNP Paribas Open; Indian Wells, California, USA; ATP 1000; Hard, outdoor March 8, 2011	194	F	(Switzerland) Stanislas Wawrinka	(Ukraine) Alexandr Dolgopolov / #191 (Belgium) Xavier Malisse / #213	Loss	4–6, 7–6^{(7–5)}, [7–10]
Davis Cup Europe/Africa Zone Group I, Second Round; Portugal vs. Switzerland; Bern, Switzerland; Davis Cup; Hard, indoor July 8, 2011	195	RR	(Switzerland) Stanislas Wawrinka	(Portugal) Frederico Gil / #207 (Portugal) Leonardo Tavares / #162	Win	6–3, 6–4, 6–4
Davis Cup World Group play-offs Australia vs. Switzerland; Sydney, Australia; Davis Cup; Grass, outdoor September 16, 2011	196	RR	(Switzerland) Stanislas Wawrinka	(Australia) Lleyton Hewitt / #513 (Australia) Chris Guccione / #141	Loss	6–2, 4–6, 2–6, 6–7^{(5–7)}

== 2011 Tournament Schedule ==
=== Singles schedule ===
Date	Tournament	Location	Category	Surface	2010 Result	2010 Points	New Points	Outcome
3 January 2011– 8 January 2011	Qatar ExxonMobil Open	Doha (QAT)	ATP World Tour 250	Hard	SF	~~90~~	250	Winner (defeated Nikolay Davydenko, 6–3, 6–4)
17 January 2011– 30 January 2011	Australian Open	Melbourne (AUS)	Grand Slam	Hard	W	2000	720	Semifinals (lost to Novak Djokovic, 6–7^{(3–7)}, 5–7, 4–6)
21 February 2011– 27 February 2011	Dubai Duty Free Tennis Championships	Dubai (UAE)	ATP World Tour 500	Hard	A	N/A	300	Final (lost to Novak Djokovic, 3–6, 3–6)
7 March 2011– 20 March 2011	BNP Paribas Open	Indian Wells (USA)	ATP World Tour Masters 1000	Hard	R32	45	360	Semifinals (lost to Novak Djokovic, 3–6, 6–3, 2–6)
21 March 2011– 3 April 2011	Sony Ericsson Open	Miami (USA)	ATP World Tour Masters 1000	Hard	R16	90	360	Semifinals (lost to Rafael Nadal, 3–6, 2–6)
10 April 2011– 17 April 2011	Monte-Carlo Rolex Masters	Monte Carlo (MON)	ATP World Tour Masters 1000	Clay	A	N/A	180	Quarterfinals (lost to Jürgen Melzer, 4–6, 4–6)
25 April 2011– 1 May 2011	Estoril Open	Estoril (POR)	ATP World Tour 250	Clay	SF	~~90~~	N/A	Absent
2 May 2011– 8 May 2011	Mutua Madrileña Madrid Open	Madrid (ESP)	ATP World Tour Masters 1000	Clay	F	600	360	Semifinals (lost to Rafael Nadal, 7–5, 1–6, 3–6)
9 May 2011– 15 May 2011	Internazionali BNL d'Italia	Rome (ITA)	ATP World Tour Masters 1000	Clay	R32	10	90	Third Round (lost to Richard Gasquet, 6–4, 6–7^{(2–7)}, 6–7^{(4–7)})
23 May 2011– 5 June 2011	French Open	Paris (FRA)	Grand Slam	Clay	QF	360	1200	Final (lost to Rafael Nadal, 5–7, 6–7^{(3–7)}, 7–5, 1–6)
6 June 2011– 12 June 2011	Gerry Weber Open	Halle (GER)	ATP World Tour 250	Grass	F	150	N/A	Withdrew
20 June 2011– 3 July 2011	The Championships, Wimbledon	Wimbledon (GBR)	Grand Slam	Grass	QF	360	360	Quarterfinals (lost to Jo-Wilfried Tsonga, 6–3, 7–6^{(7–3)}, 4–6, 4–6, 4–6)
8 July 2011– 10 July 2011	Davis Cup Europe/Africa Zone Group I, 2R: Switzerland vs. Portugal	Bern (SUI)	Davis Cup	Hard (i)	N/A	N/A	N/A	Switzerland def. Portugal 5–0, Switzerland advanced to WG Playoffs
8 August 2011– 14 August 2011	Rogers Cup	Montreal (CAN)	ATP World Tour Masters 1000	Hard	F	600	90	Third Round (lost to Jo-Wilfried Tsonga, 6–7^{(3–7)}, 6–4, 1–6)
15 August 2011– 21 August 2011	Western & Southern Open	Cincinnati (USA)	ATP World Tour Masters 1000	Hard	W	1000	180	Quarterfinals (lost to Tomáš Berdych, 2–6, 6–7^{(3–7)})
29 August 2011– 12 September 2011	US Open	New York (USA)	Grand Slam	Hard	SF	720	720	Semifinals (lost to Novak Djokovic, 7–6^{(9–7)}, 6–4, 3–6, 2–6, 5–7)
16 September 2011– 18 September 2011	Davis Cup World Group play-offs: Australia vs. Switzerland	Sydney (AUS)	Davis Cup	Grass	A	N/A	~~15~~	Switzerland def. Australia 3–2, Switzerland advanced to 2012 WG
10 October 2011– 16 October 2011	Shanghai Rolex Masters	Shanghai (CHN)	ATP World Tour Masters 1000	Hard	F	600	0	Withdrew
17 October 2011- 23 October 2011	If Stockholm Open	Stockholm (SWE)	ATP World Tour 250	Hard (i)	W	250	N/A	Absent
30 October 2011– 6 November 2011	Swiss Indoors Basel	Basel (SUI)	ATP World Tour 500	Hard (i)	W	500	500	Winner (defeated Kei Nishikori, 6–1, 6–3)
7 November 2011– 13 November 2011	BNP Paribas Masters	Paris (FRA)	ATP World Tour Masters 1000	Hard (i)	SF	360	1000	Winner (defeated Jo-Wilfried Tsonga, 6–1, 7–6^{(7–3)})
20 November 2011– 27 November 2011	Barclays ATP World Tour Finals	London (GBR)	ATP World Tour Finals	Hard (i)	W	1500	1500	Winner (defeated Jo-Wilfried Tsonga, 6–3, 6–7^{(6–8)}, 6–3)
Total year-end points						9145	8170	▼975 difference

=== Doubles schedule ===
Date	Championship	Location	Category	Surface	2010 Result	2010 Points	New Points	Outcome
7 March 2011– 20 March 2011	BNP Paribas Open	Indian Wells (USA)	ATP World Tour Masters 1000	Hard	DNP	N/A	600	Final (lost to Dolgopolov/Malisse, 4–6, 7–6^{(7–5)}, [7–10])
9 May 2011– 15 May 2011	Internazionali BNL d'Italia	Rome (ITA)	ATP World Tour Masters 1000	Clay	QF	180	N/A	Did not play doubles
6 June 2011– 12 June 2011	Gerry Weber Open	Halle (GER)	ATP World Tour 250	Grass	R16	0	N/A	Withdrew
8 July 2011– 10 July 2011	Davis Cup Europe/Africa Zone Group I, 2R: Switzerland vs. Portugal	Bern (SUI)	Davis Cup	Hard (i)	N/A	N/A	N/A	Switzerland def. Portugal 5–0, Switzerland advanced to WG Playoffs
16 September 2011– 18 September 2011	Davis Cup World Group play-offs: Australia vs. Switzerland	Sydney (AUS)	Davis Cup	Grass	A	N/A	0	Switzerland def. Australia 3–2, Switzerland advanced to 2012 WG
Total year-end points						180	600	▲420 difference

== Yearly Records ==
=== Head-to-Head matchups ===
Ordered by number of wins

- (France) Jo-Wilfried Tsonga 6–2
- (Switzerland) Stanislas Wawrinka 4–0
- (Argentina) Juan Mónaco 3–0
- (Croatia) Marin Čilić 2–0
- (Spain) Feliciano López 2–0
- (Belgium) Xavier Malisse 2–0
- (France) Adrian Mannarino 2–0
- (France) Gilles Simon 2–0
- (France) Richard Gasquet 2–1
- (Russia) Igor Andreev 1–0
- (United States) James Blake 1–0
- (Argentina) Juan Ignacio Chela 1–0
- (Switzerland) Marco Chiudinelli 1–0
- (Russia) Nikolay Davydenko 1–0
- (Argentina) Juan Martín del Potro 1–0
- (India) Somdev Devvarman 1–0
- (Spain) David Ferrer 1–0
- (United States) Mardy Fish 1–0
- (Colombia) Santiago Giraldo 1–0
- (Spain) Marcel Granollers 1–0
- (United States) Ryan Harrison 1–0
- (Australia) Lleyton Hewitt 1–0
- (Germany) Philipp Kohlschreiber 1–0
- (Kazakhstan) Mikhail Kukushkin 1–0
- (Slovakia) Lukáš Lacko 1–0
- (Portugal) Rui Machado 1–0
- (France) Gaël Monfils 1–0
- (Argentina) David Nalbandian 1–0
- (Finland) Jarkko Nieminen 1–0
- (Japan) Kei Nishikori 1–0
- (Canada) Vasek Pospisil 1–0
- (Spain) Tommy Robredo 1–0
- (Belgium) Olivier Rochus 1–0
- (Netherlands) Thomas Schoorel 1–0
- (Israel) Dudi Sela 1–0
- (Sweden) Robin Söderling 1–0
- (Ukraine) Sergiy Stakhovsky 1–0
- (Italy) Potito Starace 1–0
- (Czech Republic) Radek Štěpánek 1–0
- (United States) Andy Roddick 1–0
- (France) Maxime Teixeira 1–0
- (Serbia) Janko Tipsarević 1–0
- (Australia) Bernard Tomic 1–0
- (Serbia) Viktor Troicki 1–0
- (Russia) Mikhail Youzhny 1–0
- (Czech Republic) Tomáš Berdych 1–1
- (Spain) Rafael Nadal 1–3
- (Serbia) Novak Djokovic 1–4
- (Austria) Jürgen Melzer 0–1

=== Finals ===
==== Singles: 6 (4–2) ====
Legend
Grand Slam (0–1)
ATP World Tour Finals (1–0)
ATP World Tour Masters 1000 (1–0)
ATP World Tour 500 Series (1–1)
ATP World Tour 250 Series (1–0)

Titles by surface
Hard (4–1)
Clay (0–1)

Titles by surface
Outdoors (1–2)
Indoors (3–0)

Outcome	No.	Date	Tournament	Surface	Opponent	Score
Winner	67.	8 January 2011	Qatar Open, Qatar (3)	Hard	(Russia) Nikolay Davydenko	6–3, 6–4
Runner-up	29.	26 February 2011	Dubai Tennis Championships, UAE (2)	Hard	(Serbia) Novak Djokovic	3–6, 3–6
Runner-up	30.	5 June 2011	French Open, Paris, France (4)	Clay	(Spain) Rafael Nadal	5–7, 6–7^{(3–7)}, 7–5, 1–6
Winner	68.	6 November 2011	Swiss Indoors, Switzerland (5)	Hard (i)	(Japan) Kei Nishikori	6–1, 6–3
Winner	69.	13 November 2011	Paris Masters, France	Hard (i)	(France) Jo-Wilfried Tsonga	6–1, 7–6^{(7–3)}
Winner	70.	27 November 2011	Year-End Championships, London, UK (6)	Hard (i)	(France) Jo-Wilfried Tsonga	6–3, 6–7^{(6–8)}, 6–3

==== Doubles: 1 (0–1) ====
Legend
ATP Masters Series /
ATP World Tour Masters 1000 (0–1)

Titles by surface
Hard (0–1)

Titles by surface
Outdoors (0–1)

Outcome	No.	Date	Tournament	Surface	Partner	Opponents	Score
Runner-up	5.	19 March 2011	Indian Wells Masters, USA	Hard	(Switzerland) Stanislas Wawrinka	(Ukraine) Alexandr Dolgopolov (Belgium) Xavier Malisse	4–6, 7–6^{(7–5)}, [7–10]

==== Exhibitions: 1 (0–1) ====
Outcome	No.	Date	Tournament	Surface	Opponent	Score	Draw
Runner-up	2.	1 January 2011	Mubadala World Tennis Championship, Abu Dhabi	Hard	(Spain) Rafael Nadal	6–7^{(4–7)}, 6–7^{(3–7)}	6

=== Earnings ===
Event	Prize money	Year-to-date
Qatar ExxonMobil Open	$177,000	$177,000
Australian Open	A$420,000	
Dubai Duty Free Tennis Championships	$181,500	
BNP Paribas Open	$149,450	
BNP Paribas Open (doubles)	$48,850	
Sony Ericsson Open	$149,450	
Monte-Carlo Rolex Masters	€53,500	
Mutua Madrileña Madrid Open	€133,000	
Internazionali BNL d'Italia	€27,750	
French Open	€600,000	
The Championships, Wimbledon	£137,500	
Rogers Cup	$31,280	
Western & Southern Open	$62,240	
US Open	$450,000	
Swiss Indoors Basel	€318,000	
BNP Paribas Masters	€454,000	$4,739,576
Barclays ATP World Tour Finals	$1,630,000	$6,369,576
		$6,369,576

=== Awards ===
- Stefan Edberg Sportsmanship Award
  - Record seventh award in career
- ATPWorldTour.com Fans' Favourite
  - Record ninth consecutive award in career

== See also ==
- 2011 Rafael Nadal tennis season
- 2011 Novak Djokovic tennis season
