= 2000 State Farm Women's Tennis Classic =

Tennis tournament

- Date: February 28 – March 5
- Edition: 1st
- Category: Tier II
- Draw: 28S / 16D
- Prize money: $535,000
- Surface: Hard / outdoor
- Location: Scottsdale, Arizona . U.S.

Champions

Singles
- N/A

Doubles
- N/A
State Farm Women's Tennis Classic	· 2001 →

The 2000 State Farm Women's Tennis Classic was a women's tennis tournament played on outdoor hard courts in Scottsdale, Arizona in the United States that was part of Tier II category of the 2000 WTA Tour. It was the inaugural edition of the tournament and ran from February 28 through March 5, 2000. The tournament finals were not played due to rain. The singles finalists, first-seeded Martina Hingis and second-seeded Lindsay Davenport each earned $43,500 prize money for reaching the final and shared the winner's ranking points.

== Finals ==
=== Singles ===
(United States) Lindsay Davenport vs. (Switzerland) Martina Hingis final not played

=== Doubles ===
The doubles competition was halted at the semifinal stage
