= 2000 State Farm Women's Tennis Classic – Doubles =

Tennis tournament

Doubles
- 2000 State Farm Women's Tennis Classic

Final
- Champion: none
- Runner-up: 3 pairs
- Score: Cancelled due to rain

Details
- Draw: 16 (1WC/2Q)
- Seeds: 4

Events
Singles	Doubles
- State Farm Women's Tennis Classic

The tournament was cancelled due to rain, while the semifinals were being held.

== Seeds ==
1. (United States) Lisa Raymond / (Australia) Rennae Stubbs (first round, retired)
2. (United States) Lindsay Davenport / (Russia) Anna Kournikova (semifinals, suspended)
3. (Switzerland) Martina Hingis / (France) Mary Pierce (semifinals, suspended)
4. (France) Julie Halard-Decugis / (Japan) Ai Sugiyama (first round)

== Draw ==
Key

- Q = Qualifier
- WC = Wild card
- LL = Lucky loser
- Alt = Alternate
- ITF = ITF entry
- PR = Protected ranking
- SR = Special ranking
- SE = Special exempt
- JE = Junior exempt
- JR = Junior Accelerator Programme entrant
- CO = College Accelerator Programme entrant
- NG = Next Gen Accelerator Program entrant
- w/o = Walkover
- r = Retired
- d = Defaulted

=== Draw ===
First round
1	(United States) L Raymond (Australia) R Stubbs	7	5	0^{r}
Q	(South Africa) N de Villiers (South Africa) J Steck	5	7	1
(Slovenia) T Križan (Slovenia) K Srebotnik	6^{3}	2
(Zimbabwe) C Black (Kazakhstan) I Selyutina	7^{7}	6
4	(France) J Halard-Decugis (Japan) A Sugiyama	7^{9}	3	6^{7}
(Belgium) E Callens (Belgium) D Van Roost	6^{7}	6	7^{9}
(Italy) R Grande (Russia) E Likhovtseva	1	7	5
(United States) D Graham (Japan) N Miyagi	6	5	7
(United States) C Rubin (France) S Testud	2	1
WC	(United States) J Capriati (United States) M Seles	6	6
Q	(Australia) A Molik (United States) A Stevenson	4	2
3	(Switzerland) M Hingis (France) M Pierce	6	6
(Spain) V Ruano Pascual (United States) M Shaughnessy	6	6
(Germany) A Huber (France) É Loit	1	4
(United States) K Po (Austria) B Schett	1	2
2	(United States) L Davenport (Russia) A Kournikova	6	6

Quarterfinals
Q	(South Africa) N de Villiers (South Africa) J Steck	2	0
(Zimbabwe) C Black (Kazakhstan) I Selyutina	6	6
(Belgium) E Callens (Belgium) D Van Roost	7	2	6
(United States) D Graham (Japan) N Miyagi	5	6	2
WC	(United States) J Capriati (United States) M Seles	0	5
3	(Switzerland) M Hingis (France) M Pierce	6	7
(Spain) V Ruano Pascual (United States) M Shaughnessy	4	2
2	(United States) L Davenport (Russia) A Kournikova	6	6

Semifinals
(Zimbabwe) C Black (Kazakhstan) I Selyutina	6	6
(Belgium) E Callens (Belgium) D Van Roost	1	2
3	(Switzerland) M Hingis (France) M Pierce
2	(United States) L Davenport (Russia) A Kournikova	s

Final
(Zimbabwe) C Black (Kazakhstan) I Selyutina
s
