= 2011 Gerry Weber Open – Singles Qualifying =

This article displays the qualifying draw of the 2011 Gerry Weber Open.

== Players ==
=== Seeds ===
1. (France) Florent Serra (qualified)
2. (Russia) Konstantin Kravchuk (first round)
3. (Belgium) Ruben Bemelmans (qualified)
4. (Netherlands) Igor Sijsling (second round)
5. (Switzerland) Marco Chiudinelli (second round)
6. (Japan) Yuichi Sugita (second round)
7. (Australia) Peter Luczak (second round)
8. (Russia) Andrey Kuznetsov (first round)

=== Qualifiers ===
1. (France) Florent Serra
2. (Germany) Cedrik-Marcel Stebe
3. (Belgium) Ruben Bemelmans
4. (Czech Republic) Jan Hernych

== Qualifying draw ==
=== First qualifier ===
First Round
1	(France) Florent Serra	7	6
(Switzerland) Alexander Sadecky	6^{3}	3
WC	(Austria) Thomas Muster	1	6	4
(Ukraine) Sergei Bubka	6	4	6
(Germany) Dominik Meffert	6	6
(France) Romain Jouan	4	2
(Australia) James Lemke	6^{3}	2
5	(Switzerland) Marco Chiudinelli	7	6

Second Round
1	(France) Florent Serra	7	6
(Ukraine) Sergei Bubka	6^{2}	4
(Germany) Dominik Meffert	3	7	7
5	(Switzerland) Marco Chiudinelli	6	6^{5}	6^{10}

Qualifying Competition
1	(France) Florent Serra	6	3	6
(Germany) Dominik Meffert	2	6	3

=== Second qualifier ===
First Round
2	(Russia) Konstantin Kravchuk	7	2	3
(Germany) Cedrik-Marcel Stebe	5	6	6
(Romania) Marius Copil	3	2
(Germany) Sebastian Rieschick	6	6
(Argentina) Leonardo Mayer	6	6
(Italy) Riccardo Ghedin	1	2
(Germany) Benedikt Dorsch	6^{5}	4
6	(Japan) Yuichi Sugita	7	6

Second Round
(Germany) Cedrik-Marcel Stebe	7	6
(Germany) Sebastian Rieschick	6^{3}	3
(Argentina) Leonardo Mayer	3	6	6
6	(Japan) Yuichi Sugita	6	2	4

Qualifying Competition
(Germany) Cedrik-Marcel Stebe	6^{6}	7	7
(Argentina) Leonardo Mayer	7	5	6^{4}

=== Third qualifier ===
First Round
3	(Belgium) Ruben Bemelmans	6	6
(Germany) Simon Stadler	4	4
(Russia) Denis Matsukevich	3	2
(Germany) Dieter Kindlmann	6	6
(Germany) Andre Begemann	6	6
WC	(Croatia) Filip Veger	1	2
(Thailand) Danai Udomchoke	0	7	5
7	(Australia) Peter Luczak	6	6^{3}	7

Second Round
3	(Belgium) Ruben Bemelmans	6	6
(Germany) Dieter Kindlmann	4	3
(Germany) Andre Begemann	6	6
7	(Australia) Peter Luczak	3	4

Qualifying Competition
3	(Belgium) Ruben Bemelmans	6	6
(Germany) Andre Begemann	4	2

=== Fourth qualifier ===
First Round
4	(Netherlands) Igor Sijsling	7	6
WC	(Germany) Julian Lenz	5	4
(Serbia) Dušan Lajović	6	1	1
(Czech Republic) Jan Hernych	4	6	6
WC	(Germany) Kevin Krawietz	4	1
(Spain) Iván Navarro	6	6
(Bosnia and Herzegovina) Amer Delić	2	6	6
8	(Russia) Andrey Kuznetsov	6	4	3

Second Round
4	(Netherlands) Igor Sijsling	6^{3}	6	5
(Czech Republic) Jan Hernych	7	3	7
(Spain) Iván Navarro	6	6^{3}	6^{3}
(Bosnia and Herzegovina) Amer Delić	3	7	7

Qualifying Competition
(Czech Republic) Jan Hernych	1	6	6
(Bosnia and Herzegovina) Amer Delić	6	3	2
