= 2001 State Farm Women's Tennis Classic =

Tennis tournament

- Date: February 26 – March 4
- Edition: 2nd
- Category: Tier II
- Draw: 28S / 16D
- Prize money: $565,000
- Surface: Hard / outdoor
- Location: Scottsdale, Arizona . U.S.

Champions

Singles
- (United States) Lindsay Davenport

Doubles
- (United States) Lisa Raymond / (Australia) Rennae Stubbs
- State Farm Women's Tennis Classic

The 2001 State Farm Women's Tennis Classic was a women's tennis tournament played on outdoor hard courts in Scottsdale, Arizona in the United States and was part of Tier II of the 2001 WTA Tour. It was the second edition of the tournament and ran from February 26 through March 4, 2001. First-seeded Lindsay Davenport won the singles title and earned $90,000 first-prize money.

== Finals ==
=== Singles ===
(United States) Lindsay Davenport defeated (United States) Meghann Shaughnessy 6–2, 6–3

- It was Davenport's 2nd singles title of the year and the 32nd of her career.

=== Doubles ===
(United States) Lisa Raymond / (Australia) Rennae Stubbs defeated (Belgium) Kim Clijsters / (United States) Meghann Shaughnessy by walkover

- It was Raymond's 2nd title of the year and the 22nd of her career. It was Stubbs' 2nd title of the year and the 26th of her career.
