= 2001 State Farm Women's Tennis Classic – Doubles =

Tennis tournament

Doubles
- 2001 State Farm Women's Tennis Classic

Final
- Champions: (United States) Lisa Raymond (Australia) Rennae Stubbs
- Runners-up: (Belgium) Kim Clijsters (United States) Meghann Shaughnessy
- Score: Walkover

Details
- Draw: 16
- Seeds: 4

Events
Singles	Doubles
- State Farm Women's Tennis Classic

In the 2001 State Farm Women's Doubles Tennis Classic, Lisa Raymond and Rennae Stubbs won the final on a walkover against Kim Clijsters and Meghann Shaughnessy.

== Seeds ==
Champion seeds are indicated in bold text while text in italics indicates the round in which those seeds were eliminated.

1. (United States) **Lisa Raymond** / (Australia) **Rennae Stubbs (champions)**
2. (Zimbabwe) Cara Black / (Russia) Elena Likhovtseva (first round)
3. (Belgium) Els Callens / (United States) Katie Schlukebir (first round)
4. (Canada) Sonya Jeyaseelan / (United States) Kimberly Po (first round)

== Draw ==
Key

- Q = Qualifier
- WC = Wild card
- LL = Lucky loser
- Alt = Alternate
- ITF = ITF entry
- PR = Protected ranking
- SR = Special ranking
- SE = Special exempt
- JE = Junior exempt
- JR = Junior Accelerator Programme entrant
- CO = College Accelerator Programme entrant
- NG = Next Gen Accelerator Program entrant
- w/o = Walkover
- r = Retired
- d = Defaulted

First round
1	(United States) **L Raymond** (Australia) **R Stubbs**	**6**	**6**
(United States) L Osterloh (United States) A Stevenson	4	3
Q	(United States) **J Craybas** (United States) **M Middleton**	**6**	**6**
(Chinese Taipei) J Lee (Indonesia) W Prakusya	3	4
3	(Belgium) E Callens (United States) K Schlukebir	1	4
(Czech Republic) **K Hrdličková** (Slovenia) **T Pisnik**	**6**	**6**
WC	(Russia) E Bovina (Bulgaria) P Nola	2	1
(United States) **J Capriati** (United States) **M Seles**	**6**	**6**
(Japan) **S Asagoe** (Japan) **Y Yoshida**	**7^{7}**	**6**
(United States) E deLone (Australia) N Pratt	6^{1}	2
(Belgium) **J Henin** (Spain) **M Serna**	**7^{7}**	**6**
4	(Canada) S Jeyaseelan (United States) K Po	6^{2}	2
(Russia) A Jidkova (Russia) N Petrova	6^{2}	2
(Belgium) **K Clijsters** (United States) **M Shaughnessy**	**7^{7}**	**6**
(Spain) **A Ortuño** (Venezuela) **M Vento**	**7^{7}**	**6**
2	(Zimbabwe) C Black (Russia) E Likhovtseva	6^{5}	4

Quarterfinals
1	(United States) **L Raymond** (Australia) **R Stubbs**	**6**	**6**
Q	(United States) J Craybas (United States) M Middleton	1	1
(Czech Republic) **K Hrdličková** (Slovenia) **T Pisnik**	**7^{7}**	**7^{7}**
(United States) J Capriati (United States) M Seles	6^{4}	6^{5}
(Japan) **S Asagoe** (Japan) **Y Yoshida**	2	**6**	**7**
(Belgium) J Henin (Spain) M Serna	**6**	3	5
(Belgium) **K Clijsters** (United States) **M Shaughnessy**	**6**	**6**
(Spain) A Ortuño (Venezuela) M Vento	0	4

Semifinals
1	(United States) **L Raymond** (Australia) **R Stubbs**	4	**6**	**6**
(Czech Republic) K Hrdličková (Slovenia) T Pisnik	**6**	2	4
(Japan) S Asagoe (Japan) Y Yoshida	2	2
(Belgium) **K Clijsters** (United States) **M Shaughnessy**	**6**	**6**

Final
1	(United States) **Lisa Raymond** (Australia) **Rennae Stubbs**	**w/o**
(Belgium) Kim Clijsters (United States) Meghann Shaughnessy
