= 2011 Rafael Nadal tennis season =

Statistics for Spanish tennis player

- Full name: Rafael "Rafa" Nadal Parera
- Country: Spain
- Calendar prize money: $7,668,214

Singles
- Season record: 69–15
- Calendar titles: 3
- Year-end ranking: No. 2
- Ranking change from previous year: ▼1

Grand Slam & significant results
- Australian Open: QF
- French Open: W
- Wimbledon: F
- US Open: F

Doubles
- Season record: 9–5
- Calendar titles: 1

Davis Cup
- Davis Cup: W
- Injuries: hamstring injury
- Last updated on: October 11, 2013.

The 2011 Rafael Nadal tennis season officially began on January 2 with the start of the 2011 ATP World Tour.

== Calendar ==
The January–June tournaments listed on Nadal's calendar at his official site as of 4 January 2011.

Tournament	Country	Type
2011 Capitala World Tennis Championship	Abu Dhabi, UAE	Exhibition
2011 Qatar ExxonMobil Open	Doha, Qatar	ATP World Tour 250 series
2011 Australian Open	Melbourne, Australia	Grand Slam
2011 Davis Cup		Team events
2011 BNP Paribas Open	Indian Wells, United States	ATP World Tour Masters 1000
2011 Sony Ericsson Open	Miami, United States	ATP World Tour Masters 1000
2011 Davis Cup		Team events
2011 Monte-Carlo Rolex Masters	Monte-Carlo, Monaco	ATP World Tour Masters 1000
2011 Barcelona Open Banco Sabadell	Barcelona, Spain	ATP World Tour 500 series
2011 Mutua Madrileña Madrid Open	Madrid, Spain	ATP World Tour Masters 1000
2011 Internazionali BNL d'Italia	Rome, Italy	ATP World Tour Masters 1000
2011 French Open	Paris, France	Grand Slam
2011 Aegon Championships	London, United Kingdom	ATP World Tour 250 series
2011 Wimbledon Championships	London, United Kingdom	Grand Slam
2011 Rogers Cup	Montreal, Canada	ATP World Tour Masters 1000
2011 Western & Southern Financial Group Masters	Cincinnati, United States	ATP World Tour Masters 1000
2011 US Open	New York City, United States	Grand Slam
2011 Davis Cup		Team events
2011 Rakuten Japan Open Tennis Championships	Tokyo, Japan	ATP World Tour 500 series
2011 Shanghai Rolex Masters	Shanghai, China	ATP World Tour Masters 1000
2011 BNP Paribas Masters	Paris, France	ATP World Tour Masters 1000
2011 Barclays World Tour Finals	London, England	World Tour Finals
2011 Davis Cup		Team events

== Year summary ==
=== All matches ===
==== Singles ====
Tournament	Match	Round	Opponent (seed or key)	Rank	Result	Score
Qatar ExxonMobil Open; Doha, Qatar; ATP 250; Hard, outdoor 3 – 8 January 2011
Qatar ExxonMobil Open; Doha, Qatar; ATP 250; Hard, outdoor 3 – 8 January 2011	1 / 574	1R	(Slovakia) Karol Beck	103	Win	6–3, 6–0
Qatar ExxonMobil Open; Doha, Qatar; ATP 250; Hard, outdoor 3 – 8 January 2011	2 / 575	2R	(Slovakia) Lukáš Lacko	89	Win	7–6^{(7–3)}, 0–6, 6–3
Qatar ExxonMobil Open; Doha, Qatar; ATP 250; Hard, outdoor 3 – 8 January 2011	3 / 576	QF	(Latvia) Ernests Gulbis (5)	24	Win	7–6^{(7–3)}, 6–3
Qatar ExxonMobil Open; Doha, Qatar; ATP 250; Hard, outdoor 3 – 8 January 2011	4 / 577	SF	(Russia) Nikolay Davydenko (4)	22	Loss	3–6, 2–6
Australian Open; Melbourne, Australia; Grand Slam tournament Hard, outdoor 17 – 30 January 2011
Australian Open; Melbourne, Australia; Grand Slam tournament Hard, outdoor 17 – 30 January 2011	5 / 578	1R	(Brazil) Marcos Daniel	93	Win	6–0, 5–0, retired
Australian Open; Melbourne, Australia; Grand Slam tournament Hard, outdoor 17 – 30 January 2011	6 / 579	2R	(United States) Ryan Sweeting (Q)	116	Win	6–2, 6–1, 6–1
Australian Open; Melbourne, Australia; Grand Slam tournament Hard, outdoor 17 – 30 January 2011	7 / 580	3R	(Australia) Bernard Tomic (WC)	199	Win	6–2, 7–5, 6–3
Australian Open; Melbourne, Australia; Grand Slam tournament Hard, outdoor 17 – 30 January 2011	8 / 581	4R	(Croatia) Marin Čilić (15)	15	Win	6–2, 6–4, 6–3
Australian Open; Melbourne, Australia; Grand Slam tournament Hard, outdoor 17 – 30 January 2011	9 / 582	QF	(Spain) David Ferrer (7)	7	Loss	4–6, 2–6, 3–6
Davis Cup, World Group; Charleroi, Belgium; Davis Cup; Hard, indoor 4 – 6 March 2011
Davis Cup, World Group; Charleroi, Belgium; Davis Cup; Hard, indoor 4 – 6 March 2011	10 / 583	1R; R2	(Belgium) Ruben Bemelmans	144	Win	6–2, 6–4, 6–2
Davis Cup, World Group; Charleroi, Belgium; Davis Cup; Hard, indoor 4 – 6 March 2011	11 / 584	1R; R4	(Belgium) Olivier Rochus	115	Win	6–4, 6–2
BNP Paribas Open; Indian Wells, United States; ATP 1000; Hard, outdoor 7 – 20 March 2011
BNP Paribas Open; Indian Wells, United States; ATP 1000; Hard, outdoor 7 – 20 March 2011	–	1R	Bye			
BNP Paribas Open; Indian Wells, United States; ATP 1000; Hard, outdoor 7 – 20 March 2011	12 / 585	2R	(South Africa) Rik de Voest (Q)	162	Win	6–0, 6–2
BNP Paribas Open; Indian Wells, United States; ATP 1000; Hard, outdoor 7 – 20 March 2011	13 / 586	3R	(United States) Ryan Sweeting (Q)	105	Win	6–3, 6–1
BNP Paribas Open; Indian Wells, United States; ATP 1000; Hard, outdoor 7 – 20 March 2011	14 / 587	4R	(India) Somdev Devvarman (Q)	84	Win	7–5, 6–4
BNP Paribas Open; Indian Wells, United States; ATP 1000; Hard, outdoor 7 – 20 March 2011	15 / 588	QF	(Croatia) Ivo Karlović (PR)	239	Win	5–7, 6–1, 7–6^{(9–7)}
BNP Paribas Open; Indian Wells, United States; ATP 1000; Hard, outdoor 7 – 20 March 2011	16 / 589	SF	(Argentina) Juan Martín del Potro (PR)	90	Win	6–4, 6–4
BNP Paribas Open; Indian Wells, United States; ATP 1000; Hard, outdoor 7 – 20 March 2011	17 / 590	F	(Serbia) Novak Djokovic (3)	3	Loss (1)	6–4, 3–6, 2–6
Sony Ericsson Open; Miami, United States; ATP 1000; Hard, outdoor 21 March – 3 April 2011
Sony Ericsson Open; Miami, United States; ATP 1000; Hard, outdoor 21 March – 3 April 2011	–	1R	Bye			
Sony Ericsson Open; Miami, United States; ATP 1000; Hard, outdoor 21 March – 3 April 2011	18 / 591	2R	(Japan) Kei Nishikori	62	Win	6–4, 6–4
Sony Ericsson Open; Miami, United States; ATP 1000; Hard, outdoor 21 March – 3 April 2011	19 / 592	3R	(Spain) Feliciano López	41	Win	6–3, 6–3
Sony Ericsson Open; Miami, United States; ATP 1000; Hard, outdoor 21 March – 3 April 2011	20 / 593	4R	(Ukraine) Alexandr Dolgopolov (21)	23	Win	6–1, 6–2
Sony Ericsson Open; Miami, United States; ATP 1000; Hard, outdoor 21 March – 3 April 2011	21 / 594	QF	(Czech Republic) Tomáš Berdych (7)	7	Win	6–2, 3–6, 6–3
Sony Ericsson Open; Miami, United States; ATP 1000; Hard, outdoor 21 March – 3 April 2011	22 / 595	SF	(Switzerland) Roger Federer (3)	3	Win	6–3, 6–2
Sony Ericsson Open; Miami, United States; ATP 1000; Hard, outdoor 21 March – 3 April 2011	23 / 596	F	(Serbia) Novak Djokovic (2)	2	Loss (2)	6–4, 3–6, 6–7^{(4–7)}
Monte-Carlo Rolex Masters; Monte Carlo, Monaco; ATP 1000; Clay, outdoor 11 – 17 April 2011
Monte-Carlo Rolex Masters; Monte Carlo, Monaco; ATP 1000; Clay, outdoor 11 – 17 April 2011	–	1R	Bye			
Monte-Carlo Rolex Masters; Monte Carlo, Monaco; ATP 1000; Clay, outdoor 11 – 17 April 2011	24 / 597	2R	(Finland) Jarkko Nieminen	59	Win	6–2, 6–2
Monte-Carlo Rolex Masters; Monte Carlo, Monaco; ATP 1000; Clay, outdoor 11 – 17 April 2011	25 / 598	3R	(France) Richard Gasquet (13)	18	Win	6–2, 6–4
Monte-Carlo Rolex Masters; Monte Carlo, Monaco; ATP 1000; Clay, outdoor 11 – 17 April 2011	26 / 599	QF	(Croatia) Ivan Ljubičić	40	Win	6–1, 6–3
Monte-Carlo Rolex Masters; Monte Carlo, Monaco; ATP 1000; Clay, outdoor 11 – 17 April 2011	27 / 600	SF	(United Kingdom) Andy Murray (3/WC)	4	Win	6–4, 2–6, 6–1
Monte-Carlo Rolex Masters; Monte Carlo, Monaco; ATP 1000; Clay, outdoor 11 – 17 April 2011	28 / 601	W	(Spain) David Ferrer (4)	6	Win (1)	6–4, 7–5
Barcelona Open Banco Sabadell; Barcelona, Spain; ATP 500; Clay, outdoor 18 – 24 April 2011
Barcelona Open Banco Sabadell; Barcelona, Spain; ATP 500; Clay, outdoor 18 – 24 April 2011	–	1R	Bye			
Barcelona Open Banco Sabadell; Barcelona, Spain; ATP 500; Clay, outdoor 18 – 24 April 2011	29 / 602	2R	(Spain) Daniel Gimeno Traver	60	Win	6–1, 6–1
Barcelona Open Banco Sabadell; Barcelona, Spain; ATP 500; Clay, outdoor 18 – 24 April 2011	30 / 603	3R	(Colombia) Santiago Giraldo	54	Win	6–3, 6–1
Barcelona Open Banco Sabadell; Barcelona, Spain; ATP 500; Clay, outdoor 18 – 24 April 2011	31 / 604	QF	(France) Gaël Monfils (7)	9	Win	6–2, 6–2
Barcelona Open Banco Sabadell; Barcelona, Spain; ATP 500; Clay, outdoor 18 – 24 April 2011	32 / 605	SF	(Croatia) Ivan Dodig	56	Win	6–3, 6–2
Barcelona Open Banco Sabadell; Barcelona, Spain; ATP 500; Clay, outdoor 18 – 24 April 2011	33 / 606	W	(Spain) David Ferrer (4)	6	Win (2)	6–2, 6–4
Mutua Madrid Open; Madrid, Spain; ATP 1000; Clay, outdoor 2 – 8 May 2011
Mutua Madrid Open; Madrid, Spain; ATP 1000; Clay, outdoor 2 – 8 May 2011	–	1R	Bye			
Mutua Madrid Open; Madrid, Spain; ATP 1000; Clay, outdoor 2 – 8 May 2011	34 / 607	2R	(Cyprus) Marcos Baghdatis	24	Win	6–1, 6–3
Mutua Madrid Open; Madrid, Spain; ATP 1000; Clay, outdoor 2 – 8 May 2011	–	3R	(Argentina) Juan Martín del Potro	32	Walkover	N/A
Mutua Madrid Open; Madrid, Spain; ATP 1000; Clay, outdoor 2 – 8 May 2011	35 / 608	QF	(France) Michaël Llodra	27	Win	6–2, 6–2
Mutua Madrid Open; Madrid, Spain; ATP 1000; Clay, outdoor 2 – 8 May 2011	36 / 609	SF	(Switzerland) Roger Federer (3)	3	Win	5–7, 6–1, 6–3
Mutua Madrid Open; Madrid, Spain; ATP 1000; Clay, outdoor 2 – 8 May 2011	37 / 610	F	(Serbia) Novak Djokovic (2)	2	Loss (3)	5–7, 4–6
Internazionali BNL d'Italia; Rome, Italy; ATP 1000; Clay, outdoor 9 – 15 May 2011
Internazionali BNL d'Italia; Rome, Italy; ATP 1000; Clay, outdoor 9 – 15 May 2011	–	1R	Bye			
Internazionali BNL d'Italia; Rome, Italy; ATP 1000; Clay, outdoor 9 – 15 May 2011	38 / 611	2R	(Italy) Paolo Lorenzi (Q)	148	Win	6–7^{(5–7)}, 6–4, 6–0
Internazionali BNL d'Italia; Rome, Italy; ATP 1000; Clay, outdoor 9 – 15 May 2011	39 / 612	3R	(Spain) Feliciano López	40	Win	6–4, 6–2
Internazionali BNL d'Italia; Rome, Italy; ATP 1000; Clay, outdoor 9 – 15 May 2011	40 / 613	QF	(Croatia) Marin Čilić	23	Win	6–1, 6–3
Internazionali BNL d'Italia; Rome, Italy; ATP 1000; Clay, outdoor 9 – 15 May 2011	41 / 614	SF	(France) Richard Gasquet (16)	16	Win	7–5, 6–1
Internazionali BNL d'Italia; Rome, Italy; ATP 1000; Clay, outdoor 9 – 15 May 2011	42 / 615	F	(Serbia) Novak Djokovic (2)	2	Loss (4)	4–6, 4–6
French Open; Paris, France; Grand Slam tournament Clay, outdoor 23 May – 5 June 2011
French Open; Paris, France; Grand Slam tournament Clay, outdoor 23 May – 5 June 2011	43 / 616	1R	(United States) John Isner	39	Win	6–4, 6–7^{(2–7)}, 6–7^{(2–7)}, 6–2, 6–4
French Open; Paris, France; Grand Slam tournament Clay, outdoor 23 May – 5 June 2011	44 / 617	2R	(Spain) Pablo Andújar	48	Win	7–5, 6–3, 7–6^{(7–4)}
French Open; Paris, France; Grand Slam tournament Clay, outdoor 23 May – 5 June 2011	45 / 618	3R	(Croatia) Antonio Veić (Q)	227	Win	6–1, 6–3, 6–0
French Open; Paris, France; Grand Slam tournament Clay, outdoor 23 May – 5 June 2011	46 / 619	4R	(Croatia) Ivan Ljubičić	37	Win	7–5, 6–3, 6–3
French Open; Paris, France; Grand Slam tournament Clay, outdoor 23 May – 5 June 2011	47 / 620	QF	(Sweden) Robin Söderling (5)	5	Win	6–4, 6–1, 7–6^{(7–3)}
French Open; Paris, France; Grand Slam tournament Clay, outdoor 23 May – 5 June 2011	48 / 621	SF	(United Kingdom) Andy Murray (4)	4	Win	6–4, 7–5, 6–4
French Open; Paris, France; Grand Slam tournament Clay, outdoor 23 May – 5 June 2011	49 / 622	W	(Switzerland) Roger Federer (3)	3	Win (3)	7–5, 7–6^{(7–3)}, 5–7, 6–1
Aegon Championships; London, United Kingdom; ATP 250; Grass, outdoor 6 – 12 June 2011
Aegon Championships; London, United Kingdom; ATP 250; Grass, outdoor 6 – 12 June 2011	–	1R	Bye			
Aegon Championships; London, United Kingdom; ATP 250; Grass, outdoor 6 – 12 June 2011	50 / 623	2R	(Australia) Matthew Ebden (Q)	168	Win	6–4, 6–4
Aegon Championships; London, United Kingdom; ATP 250; Grass, outdoor 6 – 12 June 2011	51 / 624	3R	(Czech Republic) Radek Štěpánek	57	Win	6–3, 5–7, 6–1
Aegon Championships; London, United Kingdom; ATP 250; Grass, outdoor 6 – 12 June 2011	52 / 625	QF	(France) Jo-Wilfried Tsonga (5)	19	Loss	7–6^{(7–3)}, 4–6, 1–6
The Championships, Wimbledon; London, United Kingdom; Grand Slam tournament Grass, outdoor 20 June – 3 July 2011
The Championships, Wimbledon; London, United Kingdom; Grand Slam tournament Grass, outdoor 20 June – 3 July 2011	53 / 626	1R	(United States) Michael Russell	90	Win	6–4, 6–2, 6–2
The Championships, Wimbledon; London, United Kingdom; Grand Slam tournament Grass, outdoor 20 June – 3 July 2011	54 / 627	2R	(United States) Ryan Sweeting	69	Win	6–3, 6–2, 6–4
The Championships, Wimbledon; London, United Kingdom; Grand Slam tournament Grass, outdoor 20 June – 3 July 2011	55 / 628	3R	(Luxembourg) Gilles Müller (WC)	92	Win	7–6^{(8–6)}, 7–6^{(7–5)}, 6–0
The Championships, Wimbledon; London, United Kingdom; Grand Slam tournament Grass, outdoor 20 June – 3 July 2011	56 / 629	4R	(Argentina) Juan Martín del Potro (24)	21	Win	7–6^{(8–6)}, 3–6, 7–6^{(7–4)}, 6–4
The Championships, Wimbledon; London, United Kingdom; Grand Slam tournament Grass, outdoor 20 June – 3 July 2011	57 / 630	QF	(United States) Mardy Fish (10)	9	Win	6–3, 6–3, 5–7, 6–4
The Championships, Wimbledon; London, United Kingdom; Grand Slam tournament Grass, outdoor 20 June – 3 July 2011	58 / 631	SF	(United Kingdom) Andy Murray (4)	4	Win	5–7, 6–2, 6–2, 6–4
The Championships, Wimbledon; London, United Kingdom; Grand Slam tournament Grass, outdoor 20 June – 3 July 2011	59 / 632	F	(Serbia) Novak Djokovic (2)	2	Loss (5)	4–6, 1–6, 6–1, 3–6
Rogers Cup; Montreal, Canada; ATP 1000; Hard, outdoor 8 – 14 August 2011
Rogers Cup; Montreal, Canada; ATP 1000; Hard, outdoor 8 – 14 August 2011	–	1R	Bye			
Rogers Cup; Montreal, Canada; ATP 1000; Hard, outdoor 8 – 14 August 2011	60 / 633	2R	(Croatia) Ivan Dodig	41	Loss	6–1, 6–7^{(5–7)}, 6–7^{(5–7)}
Western & Southern Open; Cincinnati, United States; ATP 1000; Hard, outdoor 15 – 21 August 2011
Western & Southern Open; Cincinnati, United States; ATP 1000; Hard, outdoor 15 – 21 August 2011	–	1R	Bye			
Western & Southern Open; Cincinnati, United States; ATP 1000; Hard, outdoor 15 – 21 August 2011	61 / 634	2R	(France) Julien Benneteau (Q)	112	Win	6–4, 7–5
Western & Southern Open; Cincinnati, United States; ATP 1000; Hard, outdoor 15 – 21 August 2011	62 / 635	3R	(Spain) Fernando Verdasco	21	Win	7–6^{(7–5)}, 6–7^{(4–7)}, 7–6^{(11–9)}
Western & Southern Open; Cincinnati, United States; ATP 1000; Hard, outdoor 15 – 21 August 2011	63 / 636	QF	(United States) Mardy Fish (7)	7	Loss	3–6, 4–6
US Open; New York City, United States; Grand Slam tournament Hard, outdoor 29 August – 11 September 2011
US Open; New York City, United States; Grand Slam tournament Hard, outdoor 29 August – 11 September 2011	64 / 637	1R	(Kazakhstan) Andrey Golubev	98	Win	6–3, 7–6^{(7–1)}, 7–5
US Open; New York City, United States; Grand Slam tournament Hard, outdoor 29 August – 11 September 2011	65 / 638	2R	(France) Nicolas Mahut	99	Win	6–2, 6–2, retired
US Open; New York City, United States; Grand Slam tournament Hard, outdoor 29 August – 11 September 2011	66 / 639	3R	(Argentina) David Nalbandian	76	Win	7–6^{(7–5)}, 6–1, 7–5
US Open; New York City, United States; Grand Slam tournament Hard, outdoor 29 August – 11 September 2011	67 / 640	4R	(Luxembourg) Gilles Müller	68	Win	7–6^{(7–1)}, 6–1, 6–2
US Open; New York City, United States; Grand Slam tournament Hard, outdoor 29 August – 11 September 2011	68 / 641	QF	(United States) Andy Roddick (21)	21	Win	6–2, 6–1, 6–3
US Open; New York City, United States; Grand Slam tournament Hard, outdoor 29 August – 11 September 2011	69 / 642	SF	(United Kingdom) Andy Murray (4)	4	Win	6–4, 6–2, 3–6, 6–2
US Open; New York City, United States; Grand Slam tournament Hard, outdoor 29 August – 11 September 2011	70 / 643	F	(Serbia) Novak Djokovic (1)	1	Loss (6)	2–6, 4–6, 7–6^{(7–3)}, 1–6
Davis Cup, World Group; Córdoba, Spain; Davis Cup; Clay, outdoor 16 – 18 September 2011
Davis Cup, World Group; Córdoba, Spain; Davis Cup; Clay, outdoor 16 – 18 September 2011	71 / 644	SF; R1	(France) Richard Gasquet	15	Win	6–3, 6–0, 6–1
Davis Cup, World Group; Córdoba, Spain; Davis Cup; Clay, outdoor 16 – 18 September 2011	72 / 645	SF; R4	(France) Jo-Wilfried Tsonga	10	Win	6–0, 6–2, 6–4
Japan Open Tennis Championships; Tokyo, Japan; ATP 500; Hard, outdoor 3 – 9 October 2011
Japan Open Tennis Championships; Tokyo, Japan; ATP 500; Hard, outdoor 3 – 9 October 2011	73 / 646	1R	(Japan) Go Soeda (WC)	118	Win	6–3, 6–2
Japan Open Tennis Championships; Tokyo, Japan; ATP 500; Hard, outdoor 3 – 9 October 2011	74 / 647	2R	(Canada) Milos Raonic	30	Win	7–5, 6–3
Japan Open Tennis Championships; Tokyo, Japan; ATP 500; Hard, outdoor 3 – 9 October 2011	75 / 648	QF	(Colombia) Santiago Giraldo	53	Win	7–6^{(8–6)}, 6–3
Japan Open Tennis Championships; Tokyo, Japan; ATP 500; Hard, outdoor 3 – 9 October 2011	76 / 649	SF	(United States) Mardy Fish (4)	8	Win	7–5, 6–1
Japan Open Tennis Championships; Tokyo, Japan; ATP 500; Hard, outdoor 3 – 9 October 2011	77 / 650	F	(United Kingdom) Andy Murray (2)	4	Loss (7)	6–3, 2–6, 0–6
Shanghai Rolex Masters; Shanghai, China; ATP 1000; Hard, outdoor 10 – 16 October 2011
Shanghai Rolex Masters; Shanghai, China; ATP 1000; Hard, outdoor 10 – 16 October 2011	–	1R	Bye			
Shanghai Rolex Masters; Shanghai, China; ATP 1000; Hard, outdoor 10 – 16 October 2011	78 / 651	2R	(Spain) Guillermo García López	53	Win	6–3, 6–2
Shanghai Rolex Masters; Shanghai, China; ATP 1000; Hard, outdoor 10 – 16 October 2011	79 / 652	3R	(Germany) Florian Mayer (15)	23	Loss	6–7^{(5–7)}, 3–6
Barclays ATP World Tour Finals; London, United Kingdom; ATP Finals; Hard, indoor 21 – 27 November 2011
Barclays ATP World Tour Finals; London, United Kingdom; ATP Finals; Hard, indoor 21 – 27 November 2011	80 / 653	RR	(United States) Mardy Fish (8)	8	Win	6–2, 3–6, 7–6^{(7–3)}
Barclays ATP World Tour Finals; London, United Kingdom; ATP Finals; Hard, indoor 21 – 27 November 2011	81 / 654	RR	(Switzerland) Roger Federer (4)	4	Loss	3–6, 0–6
Barclays ATP World Tour Finals; London, United Kingdom; ATP Finals; Hard, indoor 21 – 27 November 2011	82 / 655	RR	(France) Jo-Wilfried Tsonga (6)	6	Loss	6–7^{(2–7)}, 6–4, 3–6
Davis Cup, World Group; Seville, Spain; Davis Cup; Clay, indoor 2 – 4 December 2011
Davis Cup, World Group; Seville, Spain; Davis Cup; Clay, indoor 2 – 4 December 2011	83 / 656	W R1	(Argentina) Juan Mónaco	26	Win	6–1, 6–1, 6–2
Davis Cup, World Group; Seville, Spain; Davis Cup; Clay, indoor 2 – 4 December 2011	84 / 657	W R4	(Argentina) Juan Martín del Potro	11	Win	1–6, 6–4, 6–1, 7–6^{(7–0)}

Source (ATP)

==== Doubles ====
Tournament	Match	Round	Opponents (seed or key)	Ranks	Result	Score
Qatar ExxonMobil Open; Doha, Qatar; ATP 250; Hard, outdoor 3 – 8 January 2011; Partner: (Spain) Marc López
Qatar ExxonMobil Open; Doha, Qatar; ATP 250; Hard, outdoor 3 – 8 January 2011; Partner: (Spain) Marc López	1 / 136	1R	(Spain) David Marrero / (Spain) Pere Riba	#40 / #108	Win	6–3, 7–5
Qatar ExxonMobil Open; Doha, Qatar; ATP 250; Hard, outdoor 3 – 8 January 2011; Partner: (Spain) Marc López	2 / 137	QF	(Kuwait) Mohammad Al-Ghareeb / (Qatar) Mubarak Zaid (WC)	– / –	Win	6–2, 6–0
Qatar ExxonMobil Open; Doha, Qatar; ATP 250; Hard, outdoor 3 – 8 January 2011; Partner: (Spain) Marc López	3 / 138	SF	(Russia) Teymuraz Gabashvili / (Germany) Philipp Kohlschreiber	#237 / #197	Win	6–4, 6–4
Qatar ExxonMobil Open; Doha, Qatar; ATP 250; Hard, outdoor 3 – 8 January 2011; Partner: (Spain) Marc López	4 / 139	W	(Italy) Daniele Bracciali / (Italy) Andreas Seppi	#58 / #86	Win (1)	6–3, 7–6^{(7–4)}
BNP Paribas Open; Indian Wells, United States; ATP 1000; Hard, outdoor 7 – 20 March 2011; Partner: (Spain) Marc López
BNP Paribas Open; Indian Wells, United States; ATP 1000; Hard, outdoor 7 – 20 March 2011; Partner: (Spain) Marc López	5 / 140	1R	(Poland) Mariusz Fyrstenberg / (Poland) Marcin Matkowski (4)	#10 / #9	Win	7–6^{(7–5)}, 7–6^{(7–2)}
BNP Paribas Open; Indian Wells, United States; ATP 1000; Hard, outdoor 7 – 20 March 2011; Partner: (Spain) Marc López	6 / 141	2R	(Croatia) Marin Čilić / (Croatia) Ivo Karlović	#208 / #320	Win	6–4, 6–4
BNP Paribas Open; Indian Wells, United States; ATP 1000; Hard, outdoor 7 – 20 March 2011; Partner: (Spain) Marc López	7 / 142	QF	(Czech Republic) Lukáš Dlouhý / (Australia) Paul Hanley	#11 / #33	Win	7–5, 6–7^{(3–7)}, [10–7]
BNP Paribas Open; Indian Wells, United States; ATP 1000; Hard, outdoor 7 – 20 March 2011; Partner: (Spain) Marc López	8 / 143	SF	(Switzerland) Roger Federer / (Switzerland) Stanislas Wawrinka	#335 / #500	Loss	5–7, 3–6
Aegon Championships; London, United Kingdom; ATP 250; Grass, outdoor 6 – 12 June 2011; Partner: (Spain) Marc López
Aegon Championships; London, United Kingdom; ATP 250; Grass, outdoor 6 – 12 June 2011; Partner: (Spain) Marc López	9 / 144	1R	(Brazil) Thomaz Bellucci / (Brazil) André Sá	#340 / #68	Win	7–6^{(8–6)}, 6–2
Aegon Championships; London, United Kingdom; ATP 250; Grass, outdoor 6 – 12 June 2011; Partner: (Spain) Marc López	10 / 145	2R	(Sweden) Robert Lindstedt / (Romania) Horia Tecău (7)	#16 / #13	Loss	6–7^{(3–7)}, retired
Rogers Cup; Montreal, Canada; ATP 1000; Hard, outdoor 8 – 14 August 2011; Partner: (Spain) Marc López
Rogers Cup; Montreal, Canada; ATP 1000; Hard, outdoor 8 – 14 August 2011; Partner: (Spain) Marc López	11 / 146	1R	(Czech Republic) Tomáš Berdych / (Germany) Florian Mayer	#220 / #136	Loss	3–6, 6–7^{(5–7)}
Western & Southern Open; Cincinnati, United States; ATP 1000; Hard, outdoor 15 – 21 August 2011; Partner: (Spain) Marc López
Western & Southern Open; Cincinnati, United States; ATP 1000; Hard, outdoor 15 – 21 August 2011; Partner: (Spain) Marc López	12 / 147	1R	(Serbia) Janko Tipsarević / (Serbia) Viktor Troicki	#61 / #78	Win	7–6^{(7–4)}, 6–7^{(2–7)}, [10–5]
Western & Southern Open; Cincinnati, United States; ATP 1000; Hard, outdoor 15 – 21 August 2011; Partner: (Spain) Marc López	13 / 148	2R	(India) Mahesh Bhupathi / (India) Leander Paes (3)	#6 / #8	Loss	4–6, 2–6
Shanghai Rolex Masters; Shanghai, China; ATP 1000; Hard, outdoor 10 – 16 October 2011; Partner: (Spain) Marc López
Shanghai Rolex Masters; Shanghai, China; ATP 1000; Hard, outdoor 10 – 16 October 2011; Partner: (Spain) Marc López	14 / 149	1R	(Germany) Christopher Kas / (Austria) Alexander Peya	#31 / #21	Loss	6–4, 4–6, [8–10]

== See also ==
- 2011 Roger Federer tennis season
- 2011 Novak Djokovic tennis season
