= 2001 State Farm Women's Tennis Classic – Singles =

Tennis tournament

Singles
- 2001 State Farm Women's Tennis Classic

Final
- Champion: (United States) Lindsay Davenport
- Runner-up: (United States) Meghann Shaughnessy
- Score: 6–2, 6–3

Details
- Draw: 28
- Seeds: 8

Events
Singles	Doubles
- State Farm Women's Tennis Classic

Lindsay Davenport won in the final 6–2, 6–3 against Meghann Shaughnessy.

== Seeds ==
A champion seed is indicated in bold text while text in italics indicates the round in which that seed was eliminated. The top five seeds received a bye to the second round.

1. (United States) **Lindsay Davenport (champion)**
2. (United States) Monica Seles (semifinals)
3. (United States) Jennifer Capriati (semifinals)
4. (France) Mary Pierce (withdrew)
5. (Belgium) Kim Clijsters (quarterfinals)
6. (Belgium) Justine Henin (first round)
7. (United States) Lisa Raymond (quarterfinals)
8. (United States) Meghann Shaughnessy (final)
9. (Russia) Elena Likhovtseva (second round)

== Draw ==
Key

- Q = Qualifier
- WC = Wild card
- LL = Lucky loser
- Alt = Alternate
- ITF = ITF entry
- PR = Protected ranking
- SR = Special ranking
- SE = Special exempt
- JE = Junior exempt
- JR = Junior Accelerator Programme entrant
- CO = College Accelerator Programme entrant
- NG = Next Gen Accelerator Program entrant
- w/o = Walkover
- r = Retired
- d = Defaulted

=== Final ===
Final
1	(United States) **Lindsay Davenport**	**6**	**6**
8	(United States) Meghann Shaughnessy	2	3

=== Top half ===
First round
(Spain) **G León García**	**6**	**6**
(Luxembourg) A Kremer	2	4
(Japan) **A Sugiyama**	**6**	**6**
(Israel) A Smashnova	2	2
Q	(Japan) S Asagoe	0	1
7	(United States) **L Raymond**	**6**	**6**
(United States) L Osterloh	5	2
LL	(Canada) **J Nejedly**	**7**	**6**
Q	(Slovenia) **T Pisnik**	**6**	**6**
(Czech Republic) K Hrdličková	2	3
(Croatia) S Talaja	3	3
9	(Russia) **E Likhovtseva**	**6**	**6**

Second round
1	(United States) **L Davenport**	**7**	**6**
(Spain) G León García	5	2
(Japan) A Sugiyama	5	**6**	2
7	(United States) **L Raymond**	**7**	3	**6**
3	(United States) **J Capriati**	**6**	**6**
LL	(Canada) J Nejedly	2	4
Q	(Slovenia) **T Pisnik**	**7^{7}**	1	**7^{7}**
9	(Russia) E Likhovtseva	6^{5}	**6**	6^{3}

Quarterfinals
1	(United States) **L Davenport**	1	**6**	**6**
7	(United States) L Raymond	**6**	0	3
3	(United States) **J Capriati**	**6**	**6**
Q	(Slovenia) T Pisnik	1	2

Semifinals
1	(United States) **L Davenport**	**6**	6^{2}	**6**
3	(United States) J Capriati	4	**7^{7}**	1

=== Bottom half ===
First round
8	(United States) **M Shaughnessy**	4	**6**	**6**
WC	(Russia) E Bovina	**6**	2	3
Q	(Russia) **N Petrova**	**6**	**6**
LL	(United States) J Craybas	3	4
(Canada) S Jeyaseelan	2	1
WC	(United States) **J Hopkins**	**6**	**6**
6	(Belgium) J Henin	6^{5}	6^{5}
(Spain) **M Serna**	**7^{7}**	**7^{7}**
(Australia) N Pratt	6^{6}	4
(United States) **K Brandi**	**7^{8}**	**6**
Q	(Bulgaria) P Nola	5	6^{6}
(Zimbabwe) **C Black**	**7**	**7^{8}**

Second round
8	(United States) **M Shaughnessy**	**7^{9}**	**6**
Q	(Russia) N Petrova	6^{7}	3
WC	(United States) J Hopkins	**7**	2	3
5	(Belgium) **K Clijsters**	5	**6**	**6**
(Spain) **M Serna**	1	**6**	**6**
(United States) K Brandi	**6**	2	4
(Zimbabwe) C Black	0	3
2	(United States) **M Seles**	**6**	**6**

Quarterfinals
8	(United States) **M Shaughnessy**	**6**	**6**
5	(Belgium) K Clijsters	2	4
(Spain) M Serna	4	3
2	(United States) **M Seles**	**6**	**6**

Semifinals
8	(United States) **M Shaughnessy**	3	**7^{7}**	**6**
2	(United States) M Seles	**6**	6^{5}	2
