= 2011 Davis Cup Europe/Africa Zone Group I =

International tennis competition

The Europe and Africa Zone is one of the three zones of regional Davis Cup competition in 2011.

In the Europe and Africa Zone there are four different groups in which teams compete against each other to advance to the next group.

== Participating teams ==
=== Seeds ===
1. Israel
2. Switzerland
3. Italy
4. South Africa

=== Other Nations ===
- Finland
- Netherlands
- Poland
- Portugal
- Slovakia
- Slovenia
- Ukraine

== Draw ==
Second Round Play-offs
Espoo, Finland (indoor hard)
Poland	2
Finland	3
Bratislava, Slovakia (indoor hard)
Ukraine	1
Slovakia	4

First Round Play-offs
bye
Poland
bye
Finland
Ukraine
bye
Slovakia
bye

First Round
1	Israel
bye
Poland
bye
3	Italy
bye
Ljubljana, Slovenia (indoor clay)
Finland	2
Slovenia	3
Kharkiv, Ukraine (indoor hard)
Ukraine	2
Netherlands	3
bye
4	South Africa
Cruz Quebrada, Portugal (clay)
Portugal	4
Slovakia	1
bye
2	Switzerland

Second Round
Ramat HaSharon, Israel (hard)
1	Israel	3
Poland	2
Arzachena, Italy (clay)
3	Italy	5
Slovenia	0
Potchefstroom, South Africa (hard)
Netherlands	1
4	South Africa	3
Bern, Switzerland (indoor hard)
Portugal	0
2	Switzerland	5

- Poland and Ukraine relegated to Group II in 2012.
- Israel, Italy, South Africa, and Switzerland advance to World Group play-off.

== First Round Matches ==
=== Slovenia vs. Finland ===
Slovenia
3
Sportno Rekeacijski Center Tivoli, Ljubljana, Slovenia
4–6 March 2011
Clay (indoor)

Finland
2

			1	2	3	4	5
1	(Slovenia) (Finland)	Grega Žemlja; Jarkko Nieminen	6; 3	3; 6	4; 6	3; 6
2	(Slovenia) (Finland)	Blaž Kavčič; Harri Heliövaara	4; 6	6; 2	6; 3	6; 4
3	(Slovenia) (Finland)	Luka Gregorc / Grega Žemlja; Harri Heliövaara / Jarkko Nieminen	6^{5} 7^{7}	6; 4	6; 4	7; 5
4	(Slovenia) (Finland)	Blaž Kavčič; Jarkko Nieminen	3; 6	4; 6	6; 4	4; 6
5	(Slovenia) (Finland)	Grega Žemlja; Micke Kontinen	2; 6	6; 3	6; 3	6; 3

=== Ukraine vs. Netherlands ===
Ukraine
2
Palace of Sports Lokomotiv, Kharkiv, Ukraine
4–6 March 2011
Hard (indoor)

Netherlands
3

			1	2	3	4	5
1	(Ukraine) (Netherlands)	Sergiy Stakhovsky; Robin Haase	6; 1	6; 4	6^{2} 7^{7}	4; 6	6; 2
2	(Ukraine) (Netherlands)	Illya Marchenko; Thiemo de Bakker	6^{3} 7^{7}	6^{6} 7^{8}	4; 6
3	(Ukraine) (Netherlands)	Sergei Bubka / Sergiy Stakhovsky; Robin Haase / Thiemo de Bakker	6^{6} 7^{8}	7^{7} 6^{5}	4; 6	6^{9} 7^{11}
4	(Ukraine) (Netherlands)	Sergiy Stakhovsky; Jesse Huta Galung	6; 1	6; 4	3; 6	6^{4} 7^{7}	6; 4
5	(Ukraine) (Netherlands)	Illya Marchenko; Robin Haase	7; 6	6; 1	6^{3} 7^{7}	4; 6	2; 6

=== Portugal vs. Slovak Republic ===
Portugal
4
Centro Desportivo Nacional do Jamor, Cruz Quebrada, Portugal
4–6 March 2011
Clay

Slovakia
1

			1	2	3	4	5
1	(Portugal) (Slovakia)	Frederico Gil; Lukáš Lacko	6; 2	6; 2	6; 1
2	(Portugal) (Slovakia)	Rui Machado; Martin Kližan	6; 4	6; 4	1; 6	2; 6	6; 4
3	(Portugal) (Slovakia)	Frederico Gil / Leonardo Tavares; Michal Mertiňák / Filip Polášek	3; 6	4; 6	6; 1	1; 6
4	(Portugal) (Slovakia)	Rui Machado; Lukáš Lacko	6; 4	3; 6	6; 4	6; 0
5	(Portugal) (Slovakia)	João Sousa; Martin Kližan	6; 2	4; 1				retired

== Second Round Matches ==
=== Israel vs. Poland ===
Israel
3
Canada Stadium, Ramat HaSharon, Israel
4–6 March 2011
Hard

Poland
2

			1	2	3	4	5
1	(Israel) (Poland)	Dudi Sela; Marcin Gawron	6; 1	6; 3	6; 4
2	(Israel) (Poland)	Amir Weintraub; Jerzy Janowicz	4; 6	6; 4	6; 2	6^{4} 7^{7}	6; 3
3	(Israel) (Poland)	Jonathan Erlich / Andy Ram; Mariusz Fyrstenberg / Marcin Matkowski	4; 6	6; 4	6; 3	6; 1
4	(Israel) (Poland)	Dudi Sela; Jerzy Janowicz	6^{5} 7^{7}	4; 6
5	(Israel) (Poland)	Amir Weintraub; Marcin Gawron						w/o

=== Italy vs. Slovenia ===
Italy
5
Circolo Tennistico Corracilvuna, Arzachena, Italy
8–10 July 2011
Clay

Slovenia
0

			1	2	3	4	5
1	(Italy) (Slovenia)	Fabio Fognini; Grega Žemlja	1; 6	6; 4	6; 4	6; 4
2	(Italy) (Slovenia)	Potito Starace; Blaž Kavčič	3; 6	6; 3	6; 2	6; 4
3	(Italy) (Slovenia)	Daniele Bracciali / Potito Starace; Blaž Kavčič / Grega Žemlja	7^{7} 6^{3}	7^{7} 6^{4}	6; 2
4	(Italy) (Slovenia)	Fabio Fognini; Aljaž Bedene	6; 2	2; 2				retired
5	(Italy) (Slovenia)	Simone Bolelli; Grega Žemlja	7; 5	6; 3

=== South Africa vs. Netherlands ===
South Africa
3
Fanie Du Toit Sports Stadium, Potchefstroom, South Africa
8–10 July 2011
Hard

Netherlands
1

			1	2	3	4	5
1	(South Africa) (Netherlands)	Rik de Voest; Robin Haase	7^{7} 6^{5}	3; 6	0; 6	4; 6
2	(South Africa) (Netherlands)	Kevin Anderson; Thomas Schoorel	6^{5} 7^{7}	6; 4	7^{7} 6^{4}	6; 1
3	(South Africa) (Netherlands)	Kevin Anderson / Rik de Voest; Robin Haase / Jesse Huta Galung	6^{4} 7^{7}	6; 2	6; 4	6; 4
4	(South Africa) (Netherlands)	Kevin Anderson; Robin Haase	6; 3	3; 6	6; 2	6; 2
5	(South Africa) (Netherlands)	Rik de Voest; Thomas Schoorel						not played

=== Portugal vs. Switzerland ===
Portugal
0
Postfinance Arena, Bern, Switzerland
8–10 July 2011
Hard (indoor)

Switzerland
5

			1	2	3	4	5
1	(Portugal) (Switzerland)	Frederico Gil; Stanislas Wawrinka	5; 7	3; 6	4; 6
2	(Portugal) (Switzerland)	Rui Machado; Roger Federer	7; 5	3; 6	4; 6	2; 6
3	(Portugal) (Switzerland)	Frederico Gil / Leonardo Tavares; Roger Federer / Stanislas Wawrinka	3; 6	4; 6	4; 6
4	(Portugal) (Switzerland)	João Sousa; Marco Chiudinelli	3; 6	4; 6
5	(Portugal) (Switzerland)	Leonardo Tavares; Stanislas Wawrinka	6^{1} 7^{7}	0; 6

== Second-round play-offs ==
=== Poland vs. Finland ===
Poland
2
Barona Areena, Espoo, Finland
16–18 September 2011
Hard (indoor)

Finland
3

			1	2	3	4	5
1	(Poland) (Finland)	Jerzy Janowicz; Henri Kontinen	4; 6	3; 6	7^{12} 6^{10}	3; 6
2	(Poland) (Finland)	Grzegorz Panfil; Jarkko Nieminen	4; 6	4; 6	4; 6
3	(Poland) (Finland)	Mariusz Fyrstenberg / Marcin Matkowski; Henri Kontinen / Jarkko Nieminen	6^{1} 7^{7}	6^{5} 7^{7}	4; 6
4	(Poland) (Finland)	Jerzy Janowicz; Harri Heliövaara	6; 3	6; 4
5	(Poland) (Finland)	Grzegorz Panfil; Henri Kontinen	7; 6	6; 4

=== Ukraine vs. Slovak Republic ===
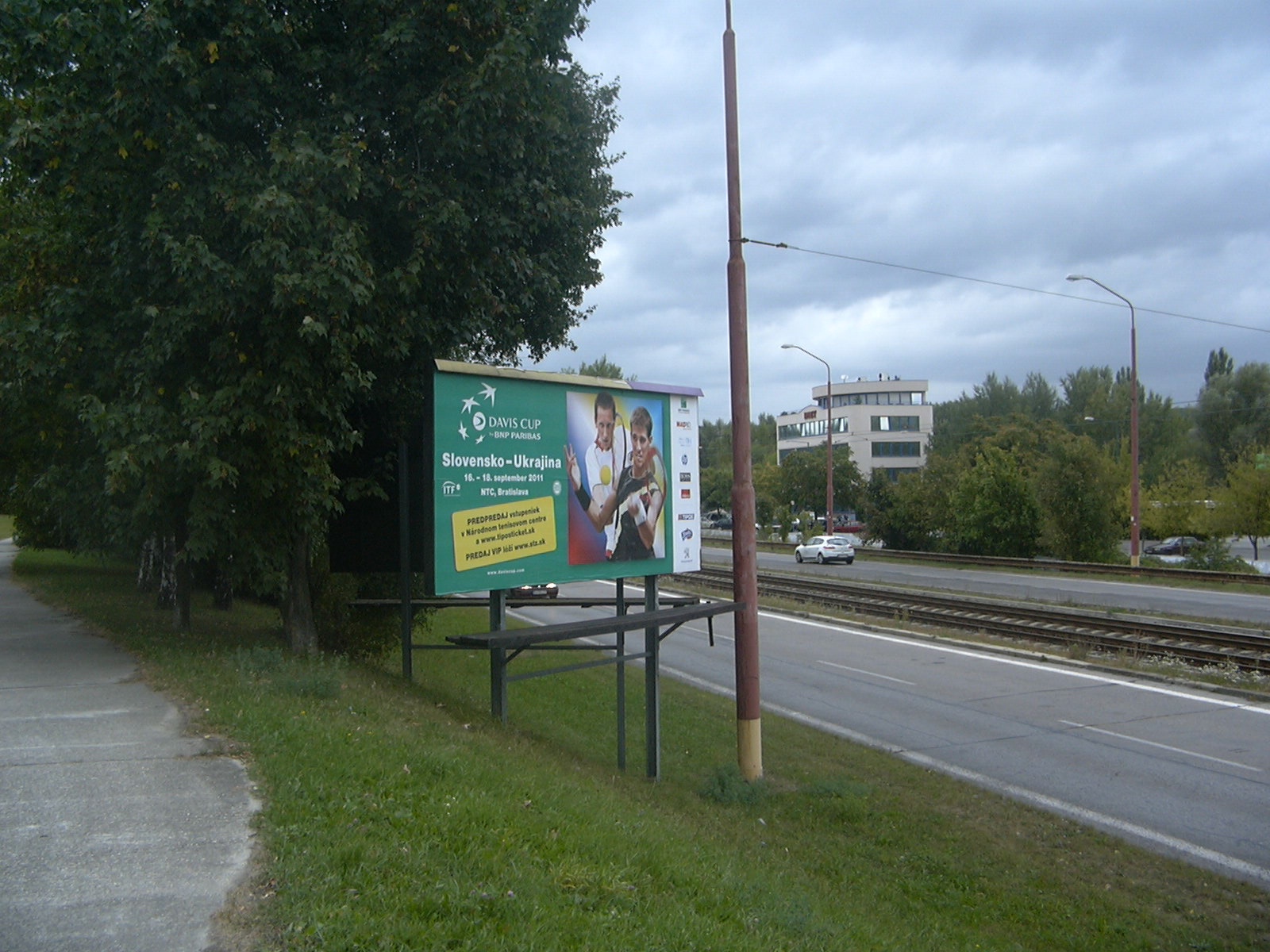
Davis Cup advertisement in Bratislava, Slovakia.

Ukraine
1
Národné tenisové centrum, Bratislava, Slovakia
16–18 September 2011
Hard (indoor)

Slovakia
4

			1	2	3	4	5
1	(Ukraine) (Slovakia)	Illya Marchenko; Martin Kližan	7^{7} 6^{4}	3; 6	1; 6	3; 6
2	(Ukraine) (Slovakia)	Sergiy Stakhovsky; Pavol Červenák	7; 5	6; 2	6; 1
3	(Ukraine) (Slovakia)	Sergei Bubka / Sergiy Stakhovsky; Filip Polášek / Igor Zelenay	5; 7	7^{7} 6^{3}	2; 6	7^{7} 6^{3}	4; 6
4	(Ukraine) (Slovakia)	Sergiy Stakhovsky; Martin Kližan	4; 6	6; 3	6^{3} 7^{7}	2; 6
5	(Ukraine) (Slovakia)	Artem Smirnov; Pavol Červenák	4; 6	4; 6
