= 2011 BNP Paribas Open =

Tennis tournament

- Date: March 7–20
- Edition: 38th (ATP) / 23rd (WTA)
- Category: World Tour Masters 1000 (ATP); Premier Mandatory (WTA)
- Prize money: $3,645,000
- Surface: Hard / outdoor
- Location: Indian Wells, California, US
- Venue: Indian Wells Tennis Garden

Champions

Men's singles
- (Serbia) Novak Djokovic

Women's singles
- (Denmark) Caroline Wozniacki

Men's doubles
- (Ukraine) Alexandr Dolgopolov / (Belgium) Xavier Malisse

Women's doubles
- (India) Sania Mirza / (Russia) Elena Vesnina
- Indian Wells Open

The 2011 BNP Paribas Open was a tennis tournament played at Indian Wells, California in the United States. It was the 38th edition of the men's event (23rd for the women), known as the Indian Wells Open, and was classified as an ATP World Tour Masters 1000 event on the 2011 ATP World Tour and a Premier Mandatory event on the 2011 WTA Tour. Both the men's and the women's events took place at the Indian Wells Tennis Garden in Indian Wells, California, United States from March 7 through March 20, 2011.

== Tournament ==
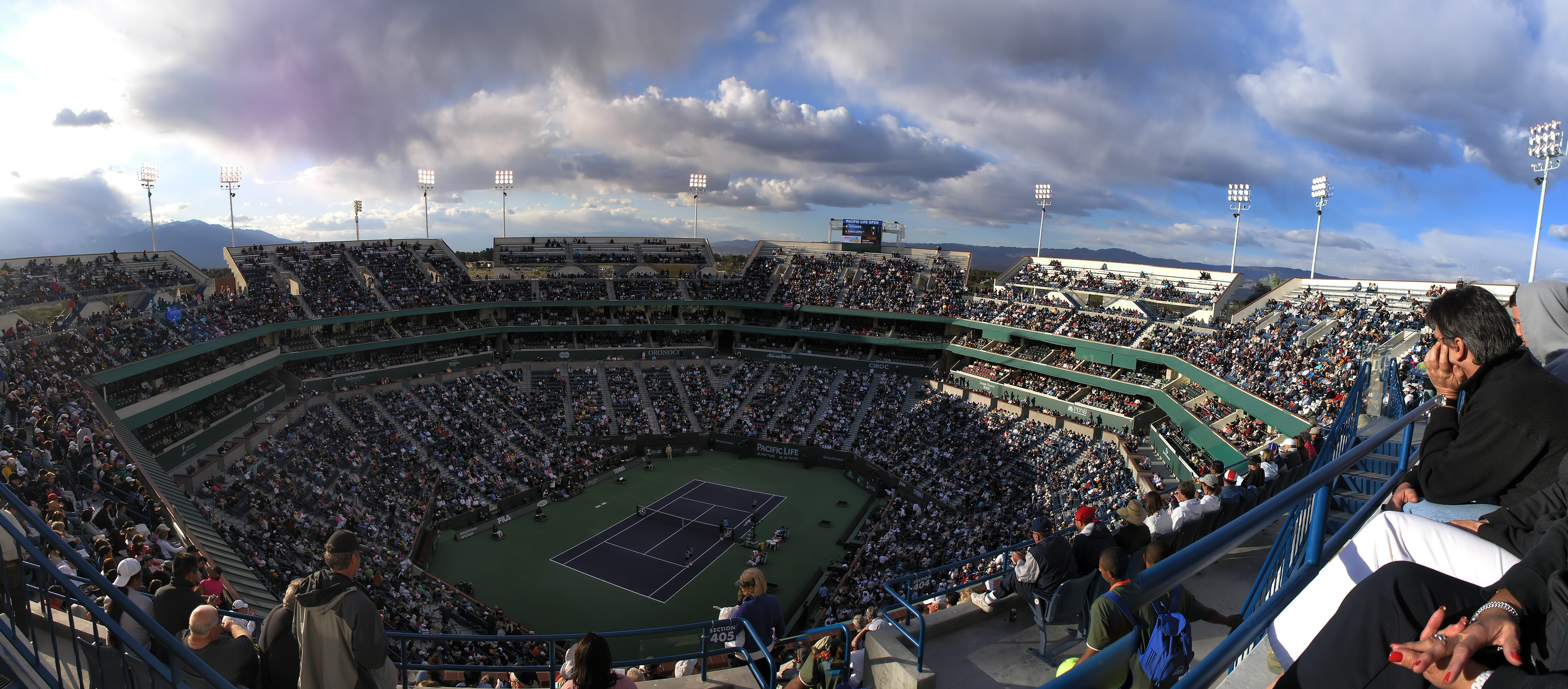
Stadium One, the main court at Indian Wells Tennis Garden, is the second largest court in the world, behind the Arthur Ashe Stadium in New York.

The 2011 BNP Paribas Open took place at the Indian Wells Tennis Garden from 7 to 20 March 2011. It was the 36th edition of the event. The tournament was jointly run by the Tennis Ventures Llc and was part of the 2011 ATP World Tour and the 2011 WTA Tour. On the ATP tour it was the first of the seasons Masters 1000 events; on the women's tour it was the season's first of four Premier Mandatory events. The tournament was conducted on eight outdoor Plexipave IW courts. This has been given a medium–slow court speed.

== Events ==
=== Men's singles ===
The semifinals were a repeat of the 2009 US Open. It was also the first time since 1995 that all four players to reach this stage were major champions. En route to the semifinal stage, Djokovic broke Nadal's record for the fewest games lost in the Masters series history in a player's first four matches, losing only 12 games (Nadal lost 13 in the 2010 Monte-Carlo Rolex Masters). The results of the matches were a reverse of the US Open as Djokovic and Nadal won.

Championship match result

(Serbia) Novak Djokovic defeated (Spain) Rafael Nadal, 4–6, 6–3, 6–2

=== Women's singles ===
Before their quarter final match, Azarenka and Wozniacki led the crowd in a spontaneous tribute to the people of Japan, leading a period of silence as they came out on court with a Japanese flag. The players wrote on the flag a message for Japan; 'Our Thoughts Are With You.' The match itself only lasted three games as Azaerenka had to retire with a hip injury.

In the semifinals Bartoli created history as she became the first French woman to reach the final in Indian Wells. Bartoli reached the final losing just four games against Wickmayer. In the other half of the draw Wozniacki was equally dominant losing three games to Sharapova.

Championship match result

(Denmark) Caroline Wozniacki defeated (France) Marion Bartoli, 6–1, 2–6, 6–3

=== Men's doubles ===
Championship match result

(Ukraine) Alexandr Dolgopolov / (Belgium) Xavier Malisse defeated (Switzerland) Roger Federer / (Switzerland) Stanislas Wawrinka, 6–4, 6–7(5), [10–7]

=== Women's doubles ===
In the first round all the seeds made it safely through apart from second seeds Peschke and Srebotnik, who lost 10–5 in a match tiebreaker. To make it worse, Srebotnik took a hit to the eye leaving her with impaired vision for the rest of the match. While King and Shevdova won their first match back as a pairing and Bethanie Mattek–Sands pulled off a spectacular 'tweener' for a winner. The second round saw the World Number Ones, Dulko and Pennetta, exit the tournament. Also exiting in the second round was the Chang and Zheng; and number seven seeds Benesova and Strycova, who lost to Sania Mirza and Elena Vesnina.

The quarterfinals witnessed Hantuchová and Radwańska losing just one game against the reigning Wimbledon and US Open champions, while the third seeds Huber and Petrova exited in straight sets to Mettek–Sands and Shaughnessy. Azarenka and Kirilenko were responsible for sending home the wild card team of Jankovic and Pavlyuchenkova in straight sets. Mirza and Vesnina lost just four games against Hantuchová and Radwańska in the semifinals, whilst Mattek–Sands and Shaughnessy received a walkover against Azarenka and Kirilenko, due to a hip injury sustained by Azarenka. In the final Mirza and Vesnina lost just five games to win the title without dropping a set throughout the tournament.

Championship match result

(India) Sania Mirza / (Russia) Elena Vesnina defeated (United States) Bethanie Mattek-Sands / (United States) Meghann Shaughnessy, 6–0, 7–5

=== Hawkeye ===
The 2011 BNP Paribas Open was the first tournament to have hawkeye technology used on more than three courts. Many tournaments before have had the technology on their show courts (usually only three courts at the Grand Slams) but the Indian Wells Tennis Garden had hawkeye on all eight of its courts.

== Points and prize money ==
=== Point distribution ===
Stage	Men's singles	Men's doubles	Women's singles	Women's doubles
Champion	1000			
Runner up	600		700	
Semifinals	360		450	
Quarterfinals	180		250	
Round of 16	90		140	
Round of 32	45	10	80	5
Round of 64	25 (10)	–	50 (5)	–
Round of 128	10	–	5	–
Qualifier	16	–	30	–
Qualifying finalist	8	–	20	–
Qualifying 1st round		–	1	–

=== Prize money ===
All money is in US dollars

Stage	Men's singles	Men's doubles	Women's singles	Women's doubles
Champion	$611,000	$200,200	$700,000	$237,000
Runner up	$298,200	$97,700	$350,000	$118,500
Semifinals	$149,450	$49,970	$150,000	$51,000
Quarterfinals	$76,195	$24,960	$64,700	$22,000
Round of 16	$40,160	$13,160	$32,000	$11,500
Round of 32	$21,495	$7,040	$18,740	$4,000
Round of 64	$11,605	–	$11,500	–
Round of 96	$7,115	–	$7,050	–
Final round qualifying	$2,120	–	$2,100	–
First round qualifying	$1,085	–	$1,050	–

== Players ==
=== Men's singles ===
==== Seeds ====
Athlete	Nationality	Ranking*	Seeding
Rafael Nadal	Spain	1	1
Roger Federer	Switzerland	2	2
Novak Djokovic	Serbia	3	3
Robin Söderling	Sweden	4	4
Andy Murray	Great Britain	5	5
David Ferrer	Spain	6	6
Tomáš Berdych	Czech Republic	7	7
Andy Roddick	United States	8	8
Fernando Verdasco	Spain	9	9
Jürgen Melzer	Austria	10	10
Nicolás Almagro	Spain	12	11
Stanislas Wawrinka	Switzerland	14	12
Mardy Fish	United States	15	13
Ivan Ljubičić	Croatia	16	14
Jo-Wilfried Tsonga	France	17	15
Viktor Troicki	Serbia	18	16
Marin Čilić	Croatia	20	17
Richard Gasquet	France	21	18
Marcos Baghdatis	Cyprus	22	19
Alexandr Dolgopolov	Ukraine	23	20
Sam Querrey	United States	24	21
Guillermo García-López	Spain	25	22
Albert Montañés	Spain	26	23
Michaël Llodra	France	27	24
Tommy Robredo	Spain	28	25
Thomaz Bellucci	Brazil	29	26
Juan Mónaco	Argentina	30	27
Gilles Simon	France	31	28
Juan Ignacio Chela	Argentina	32	29
John Isner	United States	33	30
Ernests Gulbis	Latvia	34	31
Philipp Kohlschreiber	Germany	35	32

- Rankings are as of March 7, 2011.

==== Other entrants ====
The following players received wildcards into the main draw:

- (Lithuania) Ričardas Berankis
- (United States) James Blake
- (United States) Ryan Harrison
- (Canada) Milos Raonic
- (Australia) Bernard Tomic

The following player received entry using a protected ranking into the main draw:

- (Argentina) Juan Martín del Potro

The following players received entry from the qualifying draw:

- (United States) Alex Bogomolov Jr.
- (India) Rohan Bopanna
- (Italy) Flavio Cipolla
- (South Africa) Rik de Voest
- (India) Somdev Devvarman
- (Australia) Matthew Ebden
- (Australia) Chris Guccione
- (Australia) Marinko Matosevic
- (United States) Michael Russell
- (United States) Tim Smyczek
- (United States) Ryan Sweeting
- (United States) Donald Young

==== Withdrawals ====
- (Argentina) Carlos Berlocq → replaced by (Germany) Rainer Schüttler
- (Spain) Juan Carlos Ferrero → replaced by (Russia) Teymuraz Gabashvili
- (Chile) Fernando González → replaced by (Japan) Kei Nishikori
- (Germany) Tommy Haas → replaced by (Germany) Dustin Brown
- (France) Gaël Monfils (wrist) → replaced by (Ukraine) Illya Marchenko
- (Argentina) David Nalbandian (torn hamstring & hernia) → replaced by (Turkey) Marsel İlhan
- (Ukraine) Sergiy Stakhovsky → replaced by (Germany) Björn Phau
- (Russia) Mikhail Youzhny (back) → replaced by (Germany) Mischa Zverev

=== Women's singles ===
==== Seeds ====
Athlete	Nationality	Ranking*	Seeding
Caroline Wozniacki	Denmark	1	1
Kim Clijsters	Belgium	2	2
Vera Zvonareva	Russia	3	3
Samantha Stosur	Australia	4	4
Francesca Schiavone	Italy	5	5
Jelena Janković	Serbia	6	6
Li Na	China	7	7
Victoria Azarenka	Belarus	9	8
Agnieszka Radwańska	Poland	10	9
Shahar Pe'er	Israel	12	10
Svetlana Kuznetsova	Russia	13	11
Petra Kvitová	Czech Republic	14	12
Flavia Pennetta	Italy	15	13
Kaia Kanepi	Estonia	16	14
Marion Bartoli	France	17	15
Maria Sharapova	Russia	18	16
Anastasia Pavlyuchenkova	Russia	19	17
Nadia Petrova	Russia	20	18
Ana Ivanovic	Serbia	21	19
Aravane Rezaï	France	22	20
Andrea Petkovic	Germany	23	21
Alisa Kleybanova	Russia	24	22
Yanina Wickmayer	Belgium	25	23
Maria Kirilenko	Russia	26	24
Dominika Cibulková	Slovakia	27	25
Daniela Hantuchová	Slovakia	28	26
Alexandra Dulgheru	Romania	29	27
María José Martínez Sánchez	Spain	30	28
Jarmila Groth	Australia	31	29
Tsvetana Pironkova	Bulgaria	32	30
Klára Zakopalová	Czech Republic	33	31
Julia Görges	Germany	34	32

- Rankings are as of February 28, 2011.

==== Other entrants ====
The following players received wildcards into the main draw:

- (United States) Jill Craybas
- (United States) Lauren Davis
- (United States) Vania King
- (United States) Christina McHale
- (India) Sania Mirza
- (United States) Alison Riske
- (United States) Sloane Stephens
- (United States) Coco Vandeweghe

The following player received entry using a protected ranking into the main draw:

- (Poland) Urszula Radwańska

The following players received entry from the qualifying draw:

- (Romania) Sorana Cîrstea
- (France) Alizé Cornet
- (Japan) Misaki Doi
- (Belgium) Kirsten Flipkens
- (United States) Jamie Hampton
- (Czech Republic) Lucie Hradecká
- (Spain) Nuria Llagostera Vives
- (Canada) Rebecca Marino
- (Romania) Monica Niculescu
- (Austria) Tamira Paszek
- (Spain) Laura Pous Tió
- (China) Zhang Shuai

==== Withdrawals ====
- (Ukraine) Alona Bondarenko → replaced by (Germany) Kristina Barrois
- (Belgium) Justine Henin (retired from tennis) → replaced by (Czech Republic) Renata Voráčová
- (Spain) Carla Suárez Navarro → replaced by (Slovakia) Zuzana Ondrášková
- (Thailand) Tamarine Tanasugarn → replaced by (Spain) Anabel Medina Garrigues
- (United States) Serena Williams (foot & continue to boycott event since 2001) → replaced by (Romania) Simona Halep
- (United States) Venus Williams (stomach muscle & continue to boycott event since 2001) → replaced by (Romania) Edina Gallovits-Hall
