= 2011 Gerry Weber Open =

- Date: 6–12 June
- Edition: 19th
- Category: ATP World Tour 250
- Draw: 32S / 16D
- Prize money: €663,750
- Surface: Grass
- Location: Halle, Germany
- Venue: Gerry Weber Stadion

Champions

Singles
- (Germany) Philipp Kohlschreiber

Doubles
- (India) Rohan Bopanna / (Pakistan) Aisam-ul-Haq Qureshi
- Gerry Weber Open

The 2011 Gerry Weber Open was a men's tennis tournament played on outdoor grass courts. It was the 19th edition of the event known that year as the Gerry Weber Open and was part of the ATP World Tour 250 series of the 2011 ATP World Tour. It took place at the Gerry Weber Stadion in Halle, Germany, between 6 June and 12 June 2011. Unseeded Philipp Kohlschreiber won the singles title.

== Finals ==
=== Singles ===
(Germany) Philipp Kohlschreiber defeated (Germany) Philipp Petzschner 7–6^{(7–5)}, 2–0 ret.

- It was Kohlschreiber's 1st title of the year and 3rd of his career. It was the first all-German final since Los Angeles in 2004.

=== Doubles ===
(India) Rohan Bopanna / (Pakistan) Aisam-ul-Haq Qureshi defeated (Netherlands) Robin Haase / (Canada) Milos Raonic, 7–6^{(10–8)}, 3–6, [11–9]

== Entries ==
=== Seeds ===
Country	Player	Rank^{1}	Seed
SUI	Roger Federer	3	1
CZE	Tomáš Berdych	6	2
FRA	Gaël Monfils	9	3
RUS	Mikhail Youzhny	13	4
SRB	Viktor Troicki	15	5
GER	Florian Mayer	19	6
UKR	Alexandr Dolgopolov	22	7
CAN	Milos Raonic	27	8

- Seedings are based on the rankings of May 30, 2011.

=== Other entrants ===
The following players received wildcards into the singles main draw:

- (Germany) Dustin Brown
- (Germany) Tommy Haas
- (Germany) Mischa Zverev

The following players received entry from the qualifying draw:

- (Belgium) Ruben Bemelmans
- (Czech Republic) Jan Hernych
- (France) Florent Serra
- (Germany) Cedrik-Marcel Stebe

The following players received wildcards into the singles main draw:

- (Germany) Dominik Meffert
- (Argentina) Leonardo Mayer

=== Notable withdrawals ===
- (Sweden) Robin Söderling (muscular problems)
- (Austria) Jürgen Melzer (back injury)
- (Switzerland) Roger Federer (groin injury)
- (Russia) Mikhail Youzhny (left foot injury)
