= Meghann Shaughnessy =

American tennis player (born 1979)

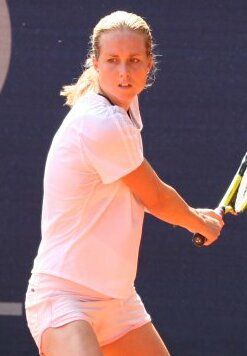
- Shaughnessy at the 2005 German Open
- Country (sports): United States
- Residence: Scottsdale, Arizona
- Born: April 13, 1979 (age 46); Richmond, Virginia
- Height: 5 ft 11 in (1.80 m)
- Turned pro: 1996
- Retired: 2014
- Plays: Right-handed (two-handed backhand)
- Prize money: $3,975,223

Singles
- Career record: 378–343
- Career titles: 6
- Highest ranking: No. 11 (September 10, 2001)

Grand Slam singles results
- Australian Open: QF (2003)
- French Open: 4R (2001)
- Wimbledon: 4R (2001)
- US Open: 4R (2003)

Doubles
- Career record: 315–185
- Career titles: 17
- Highest ranking: No. 4 (March 21, 2005)

Grand Slam doubles results
- Australian Open: SF (2006)
- French Open: SF (2005)
- Wimbledon: QF (2004, 2005, 2006)
- US Open: QF (2002, 2007, 2010)

Other doubles tournaments
- Tour Finals: W (2004)

Mixed doubles
- Career record: 22–21

Grand Slam mixed doubles results
- Australian Open: SF (2001)
- French Open: QF (2007)
- Wimbledon: QF (2007)
- US Open: F (2007)

Meghann Shaughnessy (born April 13, 1979) is an American former professional tennis player. She achieved a career-high singles ranking of world No. 11 in 2001 and won six titles on the WTA Tour. Her best doubles ranking was world No. 4, and she won 17 career doubles titles, including the WTA Championships in 2004. She is best known for her serve, which was one of the most powerful on tour, and has produced as many as 22 aces in a match.

Shaughnessy was coached and managed by Rafael Font de Mora for most of her career. She is the niece of Dan Shaughnessy, a Boston Globe sports columnist.

== Career ==
Shaughnessy made her debut on the WTA Tour in 1996 in Budapest and broke into the top 100 in 1998. In 2000, she won her first WTA singles title in Shanghai, defeating Iroda Tulyaganova in the final, and breaking into the top 50. In her breakout year of 2001, she achieved a career-high singles ranking of No. 11, won the second singles title of her career in Quebec City, and reached the finals of Hamburg and her home tournament in Scottsdale, Arizona. She also recorded wins over world No. 5 Conchita Martínez, world No. 4 Monica Seles, and world No. 2 Venus Williams.

In 2002, Shaughnessy began the season by reaching the final of Sydney, and recaptured her career-high No. 11 ranking. She also reached the quarterfinals or better of four other tournaments that year, with wins over top five players Jelena Dokić and Serena Williams. In 2003, Shaughnessy had another strong year, finishing the season in the top 20 for the second time in her career. She captured her third career singles title in Canberra and also had strong major results. She defeated Nuria Llagostera Vives, Ľudmila Cervanová, Klára Koukalová and Elena Bovina to reach her first Grand Slam quarterfinal at the Australian Open, and she reached the round of 16 at the US Open. Shaughnessy also scored an upset over world No. 2 Venus Williams, in the round of 16 of the NASDAQ-100 Open in Miami. In 2004, she produced sub-par results, finishing just inside of the top 40, with only one top five win, over Anastasia Myskina in Dubai. However, she obtained the best doubles results of her career, winning seven tournaments with partner Nadia Petrova, including the WTA Tour Championships in Los Angeles.

In 2005, Shaughnessy struggled with injuries and consistency. Her year began with a right leg injury, which forced her to withdraw from the Australian Open doubles competition, and from a tournament in Hyderabad, India. However, she showed signs of recovery in February, reaching the final of Memphis, defeating Nicole Vaidišová in the semifinals. The match featured Shaughnessy serving 22 aces in a 7–6, 7–6 win. After Memphis, Shaughnessy struggled with back injuries for the duration of the spring, not reaching another semifinal until June at the Ordina Open in 's-Hertogenbosch, Netherlands.

By July, her ranking had dropped so low that she was forced to qualify for the Palo Alto tournament. She qualified, and then surprised fifth seed Vera Zvonareva in the first round, before losing to Daniela Hantuchová in the second round. A back injury forced her to withdraw from tournaments in Carlsbad and Los Angeles. As a wildcard in New Haven, she defeated No. 9 seed Nathalie Dechy for the first time in ten attempts, before losing to doubles partner Anna-Lena Grönefeld in the second round. In the opening round of the US Open, Shaughnessy led 16-year-old Sesil Karatantcheva 6–3, 5–2 and held two match points, before losing 6–3, 5–7, 5–7.

However, on March 24, 2006, Shaughnessy beat No. 3 seed Justine Henin 7–5, 6–4 in the second round of the NASDAQ-100 Open in Miami. She then won a WTA-level event in Rabat, beating eighth seeded Martina Suchá in three sets. It was her fourth tour title. She became the first American to win a WTA-level title as well as the first to reach a WTA final in 2006. Shaughnessy afterwards reached the second round at Istanbul, beating third seeded Anna Chakvetadze in the first round. She then fell in the first round of the French Open to top-seeded Amélie Mauresmo, 4–6, 4–6.

The next year, she faced the previous year's runner-up, Svetlana Kuznetsova, in the second round of the French Open. Shaughnessy raced into a 5–0 lead in the first set, and in the sixth game held three set points on Kuznetsova's serve. However, Kuznetsova saved them all, won the game and recovered to clinch the set on a tie-break, before winning the second set 6–3.

Shaughnessy then concentrated on doubles, and regularly partnered with fellow American Bethanie Mattek-Sands. The pair reached the doubles finals of the 2011 Indian Wells Open, by successively defeating Alisa Kleybanova & Yan Zi, Raquel Kops-Jones & Abigail Spears, Liezel Huber & Nadia Petrova and Victoria Azarenka & Maria Kirilenko, but lost to Sania Mirza and Elena Vesnina in the finals.

== Personal life ==
Shaughnessy was in a relationship with her coach Rafael Font de Mora; they met when she was 13 and she moved in with him a year later. Their romantic and coaching relationship ended in 2005. However, she briefly reunited with Font De Mora as her coach during the latter part of 2006.

Shaughnessy was in a relationship with Major League Baseball player Roberto Alomar from 2004 to 2006, whom she alleged had exposed her to HIV. The lawyer of Alomar's ex-wife claimed that Alomar paid $4 million in settlements to Shaughnessy and another ex-girlfriend.

== WTA Tour finals ==
=== Singles: 10 (6 titles, 4 runner-ups) ===
Legend
Grand Slam
Tier I
Tier II (0–3)
Tier III, IV & V (6–1)

Result	No.	Date	Tournament	Surface	Opponent	Score
Win	1.	Oct 2000	China Open, Shanghai	Hard (i)	(Uzbekistan) Iroda Tulyaganova	7–6, 7–5
Loss	1.	Mar 2001	Scottsdale Tennis Classic, US	Hard	(United States) Lindsay Davenport	2–6, 3–6
Loss	2.	May 2001	Hamburg European Open, Germany	Clay	(United States) Venus Williams	3–6, 0–6
Win	2.	Sep 2001	Tournoi de Québec, Canada	Carpet (i)	(Croatia) Iva Majoli	6–1, 6–3
Loss	3.	Jan 2002	Sydney International, Australia	Hard	(Switzerland) Martina Hingis	2–6, 3–6
Win	3.	Jan 2003	Canberra International, Australia	Hard	(Italy) Francesca Schiavone	6–1, 6–1
Loss	4.	Feb 2005	National Indoor Championships, US	Hard (i)	(Russia) Vera Zvonareva	6–7^{(3–7)}, 2–6
Win	4.	May 2006	Rabat Grand Prix, Morocco	Clay	(Slovakia) Martina Suchá	6–2, 3–6, 6–3
Win	5.	Aug 2006	Forest Hills Tennis Classic, US	Hard	(Israel) Anna Smashnova	1–6, 6–0, 6–4
Win	6.	Jun 2007	Barcelona Ladies Open, Spain	Clay	(Romania) Edina Gallovits	6–3, 6–2

=== Doubles: 33 (17 titles, 16 runner-ups) ===
Legend (pre/post 2009)
WTA Tour Championships (1–0)
Tier I / Premier M & Premier 5 (5–5)
Tier II / Premier (6–6)
Tier III, IV & V / International (5–5)

Result	No.	Date	Tournament	Surface	Partner	Opponents	Score
Loss	1.	May 1999	Bol Ladies Open, Croatia	Clay	(Romania) Andreea Vanc	(Croatia) Jelena Kostanić (Czech Republic) Michaela Paštiková	5–7, 7–6^{(7–1)}, 2–6
Loss	2.	May 1999	Antwerp, Belgium	Clay	(Australia) Louise Pleming	(Italy) Laura Golarsa (Slovenia) Katarina Srebotnik	4–6, 2–6
Loss	3.	Oct 2000	Shanghai Open, China	Hard	(Italy) Rita Grande	(United States) Lilia Osterloh (Thailand) Tamarine Tanasugarn	5–7, 1–6
Win	1.	Nov 2000	Tournoi de Québec, Canada	Hard (i)	(Australia) Nicole Pratt	(Belgium) Els Callens (United States) Kimberly Po	6–3, 6–4
Loss	4.	Jan 2001	Hard Court Championships, Australia	Hard	(United States) Katie Schlukebir	(Italy) Giulia Casoni (Slovakia) Janette Husárová	6–7^{(9–11)}, 5–7
Loss	5.	Mar 2001	Scottsdale Tennis Classic, United States	Hard	(Belgium) Kim Clijsters	(United States) Lisa Raymond (Australia) Rennae Stubbs	w/o
Win	2.	May 2001	German Open, Berlin	Clay	(Belgium) Els Callens	(Zimbabwe) Cara Black (Russia) Elena Likhovtseva	6–4, 6–3
Loss	6.	Oct 2001	Stuttgart Open, Germany	Hard (i)	(Belgium) Justine Henin	(United States) Lindsay Davenport (United States) Lisa Raymond	4–6, 7–6^{(7–4)}, 5–7
Win	3.	Jan 2002	Australian Hard Court Championships	Hard	(Belgium) Justine Henin	(Sweden) Åsa Carlsson (Netherlands) Miriam Oremans	6–1, 7–6^{(8–6)}
Loss	7.	Oct 2002	Stuttgart Open, Germany	Hard (i)	(Argentina) Paola Suárez	(United States) Lindsay Davenport (United States) Lisa Raymond	2–6, 4–6
Win	4.	Oct 2003	Kremlin Cup, Russia	Carpet (i)	(Russia) Nadia Petrova	(Russia) Anastasia Myskina (Russia) Vera Zvonareva	6–3, 6–4
Loss	8.	Jan 2004	Sydney International, Australia	Hard	(Russia) Dinara Safina	(Zimbabwe) Cara Black (Australia) Rennae Stubbs	5–7, 6–3, 4–6
Win	5.	Apr 2004	Miami Open, United States	Hard	(Russia) Nadia Petrova	(Russia) Svetlana Kuznetsova (Russia) Elena Likhovtseva	6–2, 6–3
Win	6.	Apr 2004	Amelia Island Championships, US	Clay	(Russia) Nadia Petrova	(Switzerland) Myriam Casanova (Australia) Alicia Molik	3–6, 6–2, 7–5
Win	7.	May 2004	German Open	Clay	(Russia) Nadia Petrova	(Slovakia) Janette Husárová (Spain) Conchita Martínez	6–2, 2–6, 6–1
Win	8.	May 2004	Italian Open, Rome	Clay	(Russia) Nadia Petrova	(Spain) Virginia Ruano Pascual (Argentina) Paola Suárez	2–6, 6–3, 6–3
Win	9.	Jul 2004	Los Angeles Championships, US	Hard (i)	(Russia) Nadia Petrova	(Spain) Conchita Martínez (Spain) Virginia Ruano Pascual	6–7^{(2–7)}, 6–4, 6–3
Win	10.	Aug 2004	New Haven Open, US	Hard	(Russia) Nadia Petrova	(United States) Martina Navratilova (United States) Lisa Raymond	6–1, 1–6, 7–6^{(7–4)}
Win	11.	Nov 2004	WTA Finals Los Angeles	Hard	(Russia) Nadia Petrova	(Zimbabwe) Cara Black (Australia) Rennae Stubbs	7–5, 6–2
Loss	9.	Mar 2005	Indian Wells Open, US	Hard	(Russia) Nadia Petrova	(Spain) Virginia Ruano Pascual (Argentina) Paola Suárez	6–7^{(3–7)}, 1–6
Win	12.	Sep 2005	Bali Tennis Classic, Indonesia	Hard	(Germany) Anna-Lena Grönefeld	(China) Yan Zi (China) Zheng Jie	6–3, 6–3
Win	13.	Jan 2006	Australian Hard Court Championships	Hard	(Russia) Dinara Safina	(Zimbabwe) Cara Black (Australia) Rennae Stubbs	6–2, 6–3
Win	14.	Mar 2006	Mexico Open, Acapulco	Clay	(Germany) Anna-Lena Grönefeld	(Japan) Shinobu Asagoe (France) Émilie Loit	6–1, 6–3
Loss	10.	Mar 2006	Indian Wells Open, US	Hard	(Spain) Virginia Ruano Pascual	(United States) Lisa Raymond (Australia) Samantha Stosur	2–6, 5–7
Loss	11.	Apr 2006	Charleston Open, US	Hard	(Spain) Virginia Ruano Pascual	(United States) Lisa Raymond (Australia) Samantha Stosur	6–3, 1–6, 1–6
Loss	12.	Aug 2006	San Diego Open, US	Hard	(Germany) Anna-Lena Grönefeld	(Zimbabwe) Cara Black (Australia) Rennae Stubbs	2–6, 2–6
Win	15.	Jan 2007	Sydney International, Australia	Hard	(Germany) Anna-Lena Grönefeld	(France) Marion Bartoli (United States) Meilen Tu	6–3, 3–6, 7–6^{(7–2)}
Loss	13.	Feb 2010	U.S. National Indoor Championships	Hard (i)	(United States) Bethanie Mattek-Sands	(United States) Vania King (Netherlands) Michaëlla Krajicek	5–7, 2–6
Win	16.	May 2010	Warsaw Open, Poland	Clay	(Spain) Virginia Ruano Pascual	(Zimbabwe) Cara Black (China) Yan Zi	6–3, 6–4
Loss	14.	Aug 2010	New Haven Open, US	Hard	(United States) Bethanie Mattek-Sands	(Czech Republic) Květa Peschke (Slovenia) Katarina Srebotnik	5–7, 0–6
Win	17.	Feb 2011	Paris Indoors, France	Hard (i)	(United States) Bethanie Mattek-Sands	(Russia) Vera Dushevina (Russia) Ekaterina Makarova	6–4, 6–2
Loss	15.	Mar 2011	Indian Wells Open, US	Hard	(United States) Bethanie Mattek-Sands	(India) Sania Mirza (Russia) Elena Vesnina	0–6, 5–7
Loss	16.	Apr 2011	Charleston Open, US	Clay	(United States) Bethanie Mattek-Sands	(India) Sania Mirza (Russia) Elena Vesnina	4–6, 4–6
