= State Farm Women's Tennis Classic =

Women's tennis tournament

Defunct tennis tournament
- Tour: WTA Tour
- Founded: 2000
- Abolished: 2003
- Editions: 4
- Location: Scottsdale, Arizona, U.S.
- Category: Tier II
- Surface: Hard / outdoor

The State Farm Women's Tennis Classic was a women's tennis tournament held in Scottsdale, Arizona, United States from 2000 to 2003. It was played on outdoor hardcourts and was a Tier II tournament throughout its run. Despite its short time as a WTA tournament, it boasts an impressive list of winners including Serena Williams and Lindsay Davenport.

== Past finals ==
=== Singles ===
Year	Champions	Runners-up	Score
2000	(Switzerland) Martina Hingis & (United States) Lindsay Davenport (final abandoned)		N/A
2001	(United States) Lindsay Davenport	(United States) Meghann Shaughnessy	6–2, 6–3
2002	(United States) Serena Williams	(United States) Jennifer Capriati	6–2, 4–6, 6–4
2003	(Japan) Ai Sugiyama	(Belgium) Kim Clijsters	3–6, 7–5, 6–4

=== Doubles ===
Year	Champions	Runners-up	Score
2000	Final cancelled (rain)		N/A
2001	(United States) Lisa Raymond (Australia) Rennae Stubbs	(Belgium) Kim Clijsters (United States) Meghann Shaughnessy	Walkover
2002	(United States) Lisa Raymond (Australia) Rennae Stubbs	(Zimbabwe) Cara Black (Russia) Elena Likhovtseva	6–3, 5–7, 7–6
2003	(Belgium) Kim Clijsters (Japan) Ai Sugiyama	(United States) Lindsay Davenport (United States) Lisa Raymond	6–1, 6–4

== See also ==
- List of tennis tournaments
