= 2011 ATP World Tour Finals =

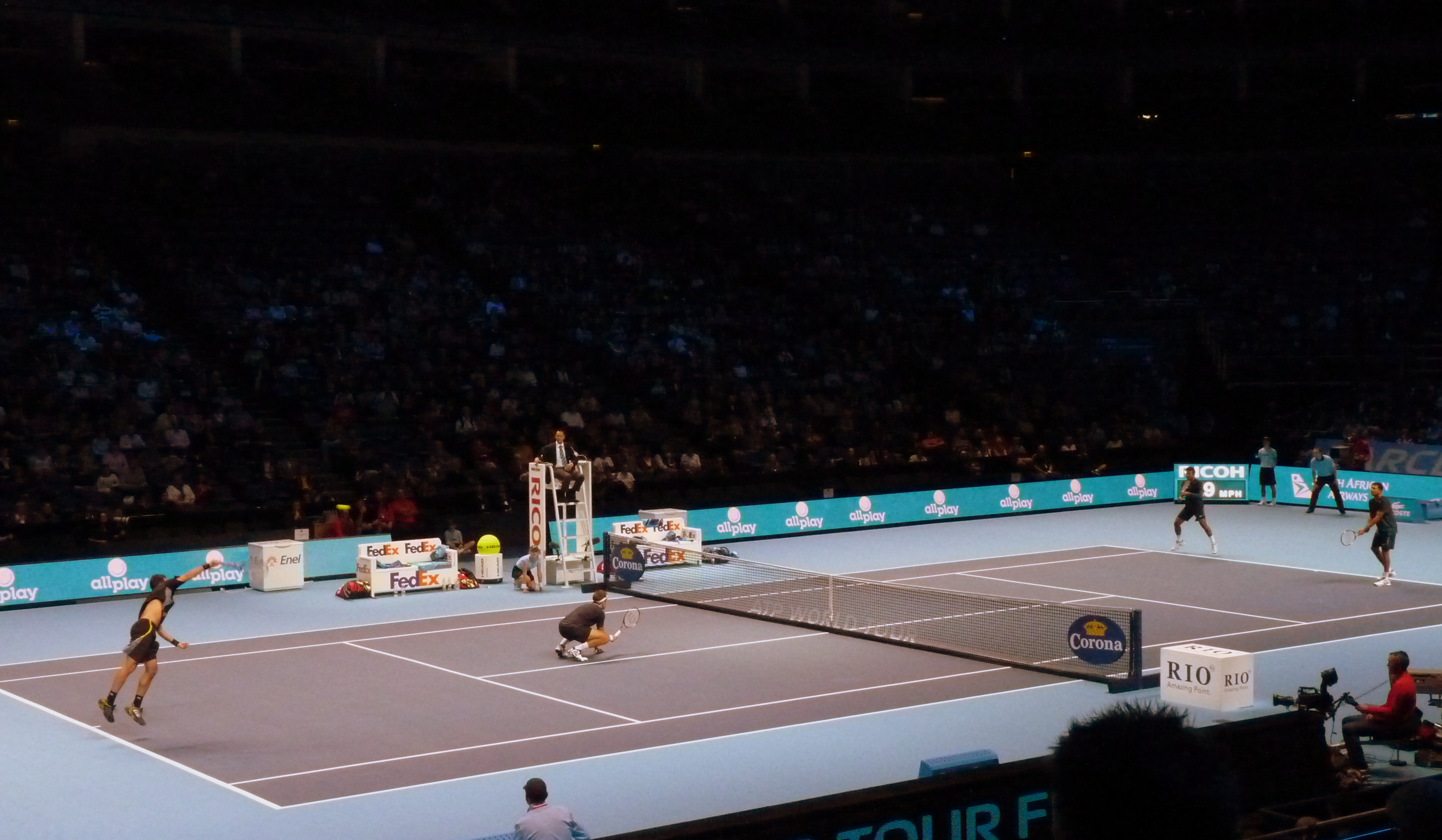
- Date: 20 – 27 November
- Edition: 42nd (singles) / 37th (doubles)
- Category: World Tour Finals
- Draw: 8S / 8D
- Prize money: $5,070,000
- Surface: Hard / indoor
- Location: London, United Kingdom
- Venue: O_{2} arena

Champions

Singles
- (Switzerland) Roger Federer

Doubles
- (Belarus) Max Mirnyi / (Canada) Daniel Nestor
- ATP World Tour Finals

The 2011 ATP World Tour Finals (also known as the 2011 Barclays ATP World Tour Finals for sponsorship reasons) was a tennis tournament that was played at the O_{2} Arena in London, United Kingdom between 20 and 27 November 2011. The defending champion in singles was Roger Federer, while the defending champions in doubles were Daniel Nestor and Nenad Zimonjić. However, they did not defend their title together because they separated after the 2010 event. Zimonjic partnered with Michaël Llodra for the season, and Nestor partnered with Max Mirnyi. Federer successfully defended his crown, winning a record-breaking sixth title, while Nestor and Mirnyi captured the doubles title.

== Finals ==
=== Singles ===
(Switzerland) Roger Federer defeated (France) Jo-Wilfried Tsonga, 6–3, 6–7^{(6–8)}, 6–3

- It was Federer's 4th title of the year and 70th of his career. It was his 6th win at the event, winning in 2003, 2004, 2006, 2007 and 2010.

=== Doubles ===
(Belarus) Max Mirnyi / (Canada) Daniel Nestor defeated (Poland) Mariusz Fyrstenberg / (Poland) Marcin Matkowski, 7–5, 6–3

== Tournament ==
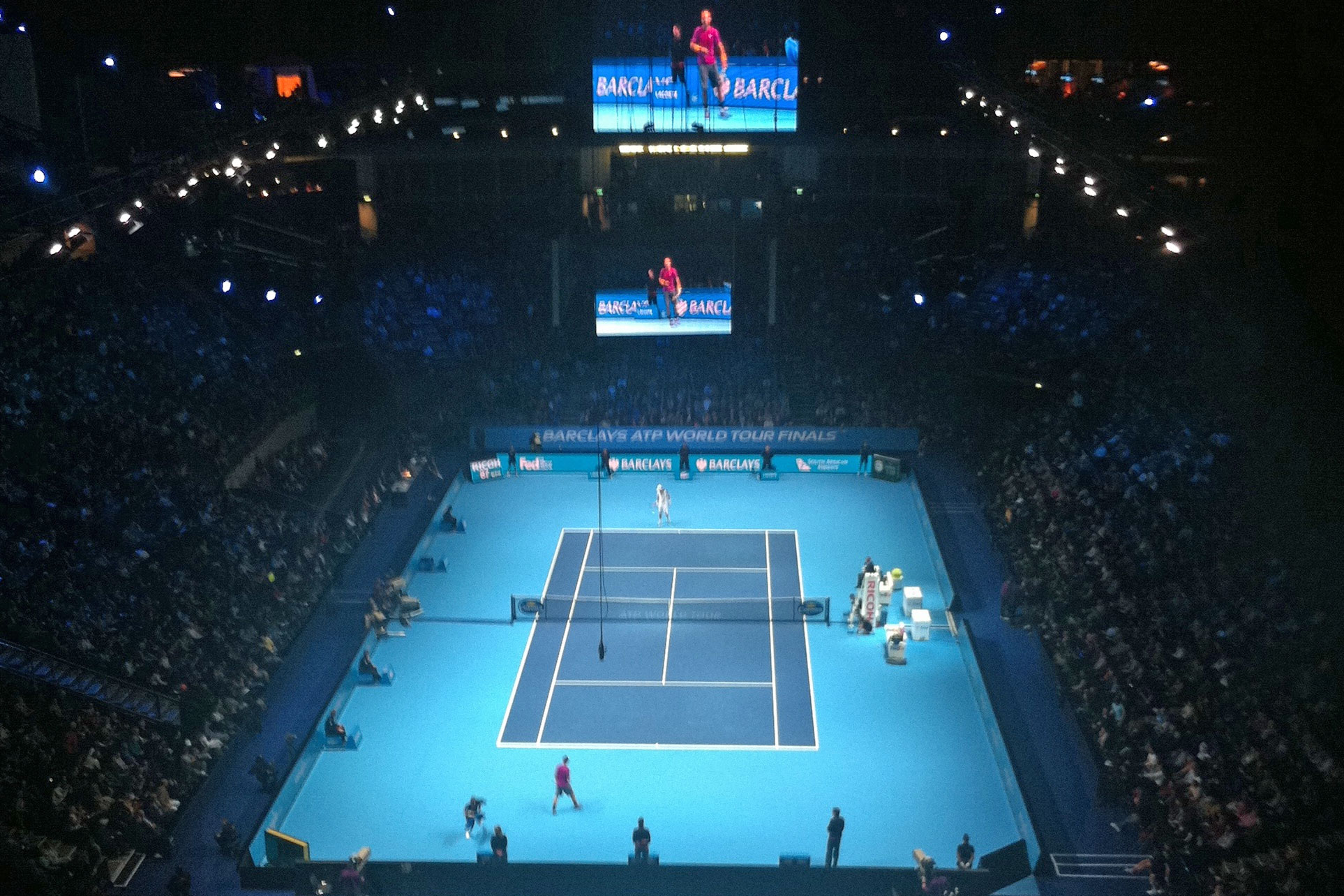
Singles play on the O_{2} Arena during the 2010 event

The 2011 ATP World Tour Finals took place from 20 to 27 November at the O_{2} Arena in London, United Kingdom. It was the 42nd edition of the tournament (37th for doubles). The tournament was run by the Association of Tennis Professionals (ATP) and was part of the 2011 ATP World Tour. The event took place on indoor hard courts. It served as the season-ending championships for players on the ATP Tour. The eight players who qualified for the event were split into two groups of four. During this stage, players competed in a round-robin format (meaning players play against all the other players in their group). The two players with the best results in each group progressed to the semifinals, where the winners of a group faced the runners-up of the other group. This stage, however, was a knock-out stage. The doubles competition used the same format.

== Points and prize money ==
Stage	Singles	Doubles^{1}	Points
Undefeated Champion	$1,630,000	$287,500	1,500
Champion	$770,000	$125,000	500
Semifinal win	$380,000	$30,000	400
Round robin per match win	$120,000	$22,500	200
Participation fee	$120,000^{2}	$65,000^{3}	–
Alternates	$70,000	$25,000	–

- ^{1} Prize money for doubles was per team.
- ^{2} Pro-rated on a per-match basis: $70,000 = 1 match, $95,000 = 2 matches, $120,000 = 3 matches
- ^{3} Pro-rated on a per-match basis: $30,000 = 1 match, $50,000 = 2 matches, $65,000 = 3 matches

== Qualification ==
The top eight players (or teams) with the most countable points accumulated in Grand Slam, ATP World Tour, and Davis Cup tournaments during the year qualified for the 2011 Barclays ATP World Tour Finals. Countable points included points earned in 2011, plus points earned at the 2010 Davis Cup final and the late-season 2010 Challengers played after the 2010 Barclays ATP World Tour Finals.

To qualify, a player who finished in the 2010 year-end top 30 must have competed in four Grand Slam tournaments and eight ATP World Tour Masters 1000 tournaments during 2011. The best four ATP World Tour 500 events in 2011 and best two ATP World Tour 250 events in 2011 counted towards the ranking. All direct acceptance players at the time of the entry deadline who did not play an event receive a 0-pointer for that event. The Monte Carlo Rolex Masters 1000 became optional in 2009, but if a player chose to participate in it, its result was counted in and the fourth-best result in an ATP 500 event was ignored (the three best ATP 500 results remained). If a player did not play enough ATP 500 events and did not have an ATP 250 or Challenger appearances with a better result, the Davis Cup was counted in the 500s table (if the player entered or achieved better results). If a player did not play enough ATP 250 or Challenger events, the World Team Championship was counted in the 250s table (if the player entered or achieved better results). If a player could not be present in all required tournament classes (i.e. because of an injury), all uncounted ATP 250 or Challenger results were eligible to be included in the 18 valid tournaments. In teams rankings, Challenger points were excluded.

A player who was out of competition for 30 or more days, due to a verified injury, was not penalized. The 2011 Barclays ATP World Tour Finals counted as an additional 19th tournament in the ranking of its eight qualifiers at season's end, while the Davis Cup Final points counted towards the next year's race.

== Qualified players ==
=== Singles ===
#	Players	Points	Tours	Date Qualified
1	Novak Djokovic (SRB)	13,475	17	15 May
2	Rafael Nadal (ESP)	9,375	18	8 June
3	Andy Murray (GBR)	7,380	17	2 September
4	Roger Federer (SUI)	6,670	17	3 September
5	David Ferrer (ESP)	4,480	21	13 October
6	Jo-Wilfried Tsonga (FRA)	3,535	23	10 November
7	Tomáš Berdych (CZE)	3,300	22	10 November
8	Mardy Fish (USA)	2,965	22	10 November

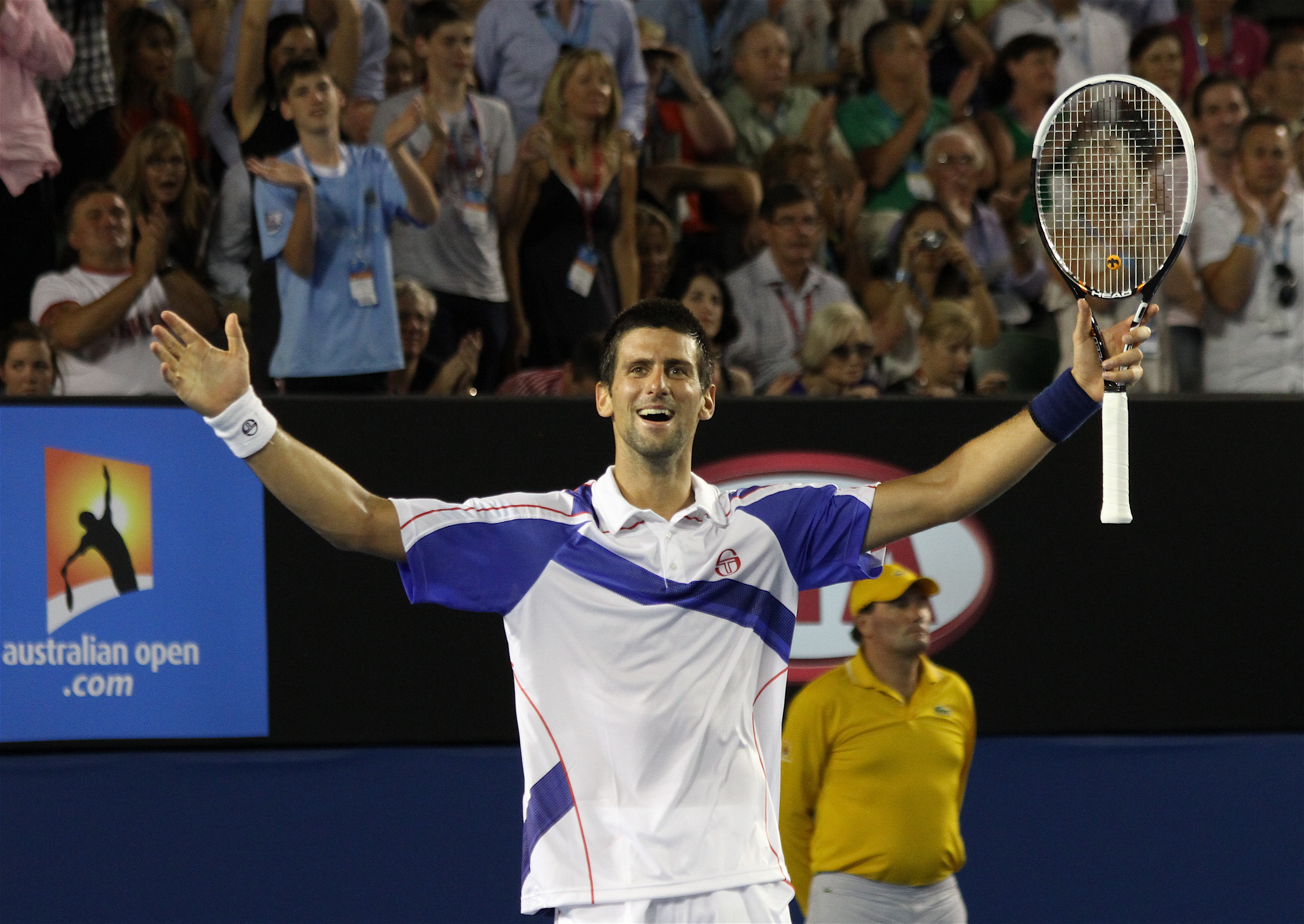
Novak Djokovic was unbeaten in the first half of the season (January–June) starting with the 2011 Australian Open

On 14 May Novak Djokovic became the first qualifier, after reaching the finals of the Rome Masters.

Novak Djokovic began the year by winning the Australian Open, his second Grand Slam title, defeating 2010 runner-up Andy Murray, 6–4, 6–2, 6–3, in the final. In February, he successfully defended his title for the second time at the Barclays Dubai Tennis Championships, defeating Roger Federer, 6–3, 6–3. The Serb closed the following month by clinching the "Sunshine double" (both hard-court Masters title in Indian Wells and Miami) for the first time since Roger Federer last did so in 2006. He defeated Rafael Nadal in both those finals in three sets, 4–6, 6–3, 6–2, and 4–6, 6–3, 7–6, respectively. It was the first time since 1995 that Indian Wells and Miami featured the same two finalists and the top 2 ranked players. His flawless season start continued onto the clay circuit with his successful defense of the 2011 Serbia Open trophy against Feliciano López, 7–6, 6–2. Djokovic went on to win his seventh title of the year in the Madrid Masters, ending defending champion Nadal's clay dominance in straight sets. At the Rome Masters, he repeated this achievement by defeating the Spaniard, 6–4, 6–4, in their fourth consecutive Masters final. His 43-match winning streak ended in the 2011 French Open, when Roger Federer—whom he had beaten three times in 2011 and who was the last to beat him in the 2010 ATP World Tour Finals—overcame him in four sets, 6–7, 3–6, 6–3, 6–7in the semifinal. Djokovic then won his first grass title and first non-Australian Grand Slam at Wimbledon, defeating Rafael Nadal, 6–4, 6–1, 1–6, 6–3, in the final. Djokovic became the 25th world no. 1, after reaching the final of Wimbledon. In the 2011 US Open Series, Djokovic finished second, after winning the 2011 Rogers Cup over American Mardy Fish, 6–2, 3–6, 6–4, and being runner-up to Andy Murray, 4–6, 0–3, after Djokovic retired due to a sore shoulder at the 2011 Western & Southern Open. He then won his third Grand Slam of the year at the 2011 US Open, after finishing runner-up twice at the Open, defeating Rafael Nadal, 6–2, 6–4, 6–7, 6–1, after defeating Roger Federer in the semifinals, coming back from two sets down and saving two match points. Djokovic also recorded the highest prize money in a single season of $11.2 million.

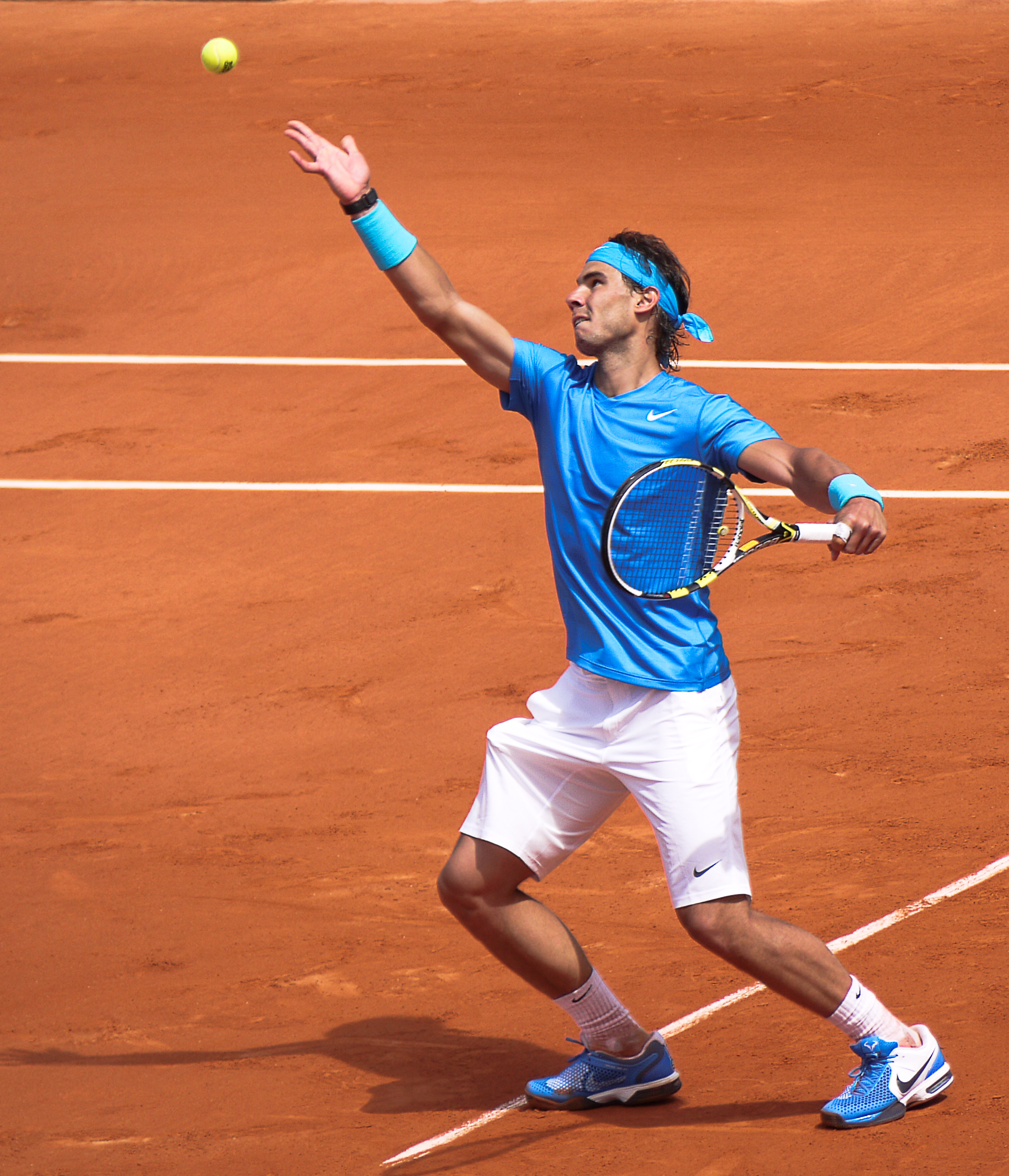
Rafael Nadal defending his Roland Garros title for the record-tying sixth time.

On 8 June after reaching the third round of the Aegon Championships, Rafael Nadal became the second to qualify.

Rafael Nadal began his season at the 2011 Qatar Open, being defeated in straight sets by defending champion Nikolay Davydenko in the semifinals. He went on to the Australian Open, where he also reached the quarterfinals, losing to compatriot David Ferrer in straight sets, which ended his chances of a "Rafa Slam". In the Indian Well-Miami Masters swing, Nadal reached the final twice, but lost both times to Novak Djokovic, both in three tight sets. Returning to the Europe for the European clay swing, Nadal headed to the 2011 Monte-Carlo Rolex Masters. Nadal took the championship over compatriot David Ferrer, 6–4, 7–5, his seventh consecutive Monte Carlo crown. Nadal continued his unbeaten clay streak going back to 2009 by winning the Torneo Godó. This tournament marked his 500th ATP victory, after beating Ivan Dodig in the semifinal. Nadal clinched the trophy for the sixth time, defeating David Ferrer for the second week in a row. Nadal saw his clay streak end as he lost to Djokovic again, this time in his home Masters at Madrid. He also lost to Djokovic at the Rome Masters. In the 2011 French Open, Nadal was forced to a five-set match for the first time in Roland Garros history in the opening round against John Isner, 6–4, 6–7, 6–7, 6–2, 6–4. He reached the final, where he overcame Roger Federer in four sets. This was his sixth French Open title, tying him with Björn Borg for the most French Open titles in the open era. At Wimbledon, Nadal lost his first Wimbledon match since 2007 in the final to Djokovic 4–6, 1–6, 6–1, 6–3. In the US Open Series, Nadal lost his first opening-round match since 2008 Rome, falling to Ivan Dodig, 6–1, 6–7, 6–7. At the US Open, Nadal once again fell to Djokovic in the final for the sixth time in the year.

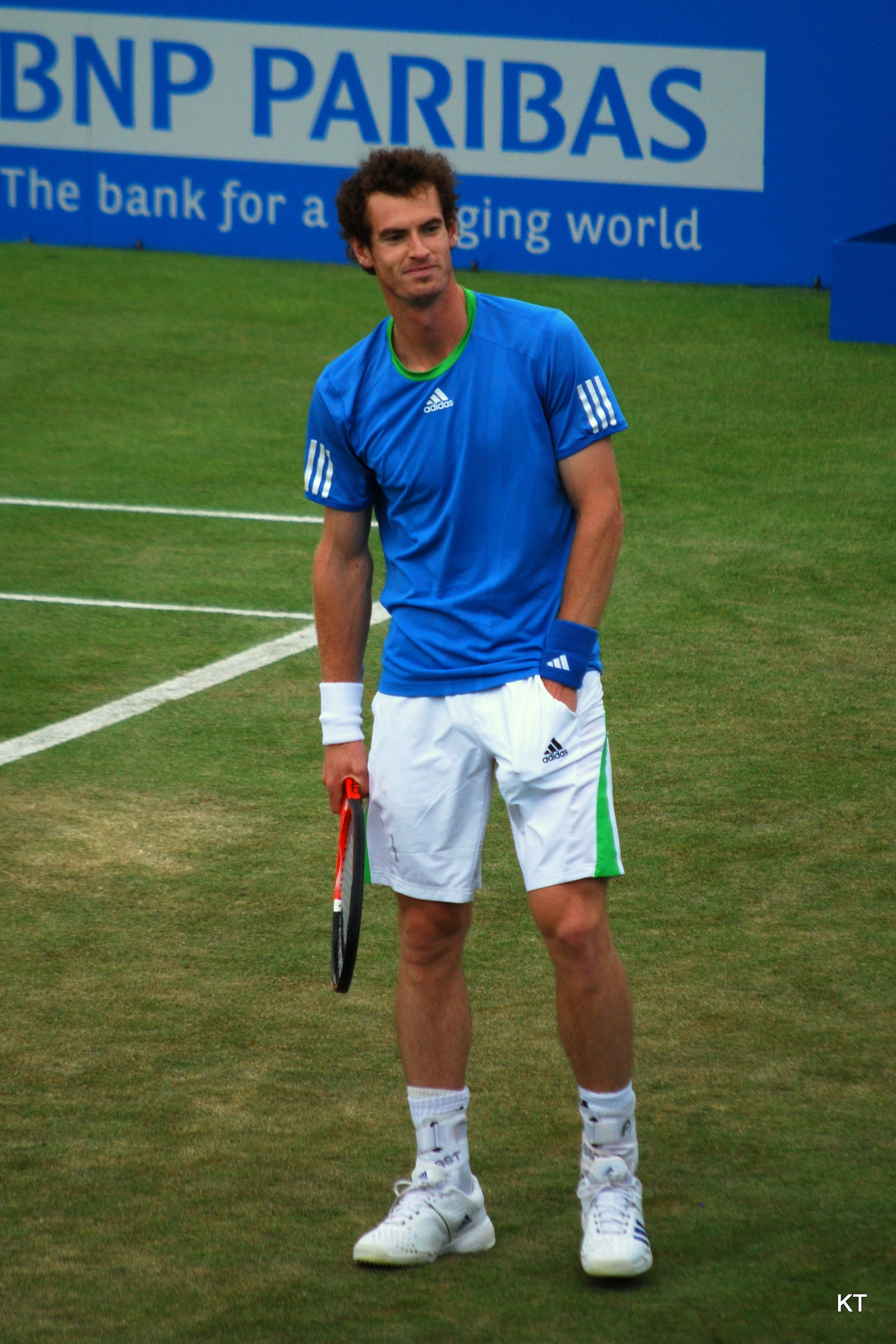
Andy Murray wins his first title of the year at Queens

On 2 September after defeating Robin Haase in the second round at the 2011 US Open, 6–7, 2–6, 6–2, 6–0, 6–4, Andy Murray was the third to qualify.

Andy Murray began the year by reaching his third Grand Slam final at the 2011 Australian Open, but once again fell in straight sets, 4–6, 2–6, 3–6, to Novak Djokovic. Murray lost his next three matches, but recovered in the clay season, reaching the semifinals of the 2011 Monte-Carlo Rolex Masters and 2011 Internazionali BNL d'Italia. He won his first title of the year at the 2011 Aegon Championships, defeating Jo-Wilfried Tsonga, 3–6, 7–6, 6–4. He won his second title of the year at the 2011 Western & Southern Open, being only the second person to defeat Djokovic in the year, 6–4, 3–0 ret., after falling in his first match in the 2011 Rogers Cup. On the Asian swing, Murray made a sweep by winning three titles in three tournaments. He first won the 2011 PTT Thailand Open, defeating Donald Young, 6–2, 6–0, in 48 minutes. He then became the first person in 2011 to win both singles and doubles in the same tournament at the 2011 Rakuten Japan Open Tennis Championships. He beat Rafael Nadal in singles 3–6, 6–2, 6–0; and partnering brother Jamie Murray he won the doubles title as well. He then completed the sweep by successfully defending his title at the 2011 Shanghai Rolex Masters, defeating David Ferrer in the final, 7–5, 6–4. At the other Grand Slams, Murray reached the semifinals of the 2011 French Open for the first time, Wimbledon, and the US Open, being the only person other than Djokovic to reach the semifinals of all four Grand Slams.

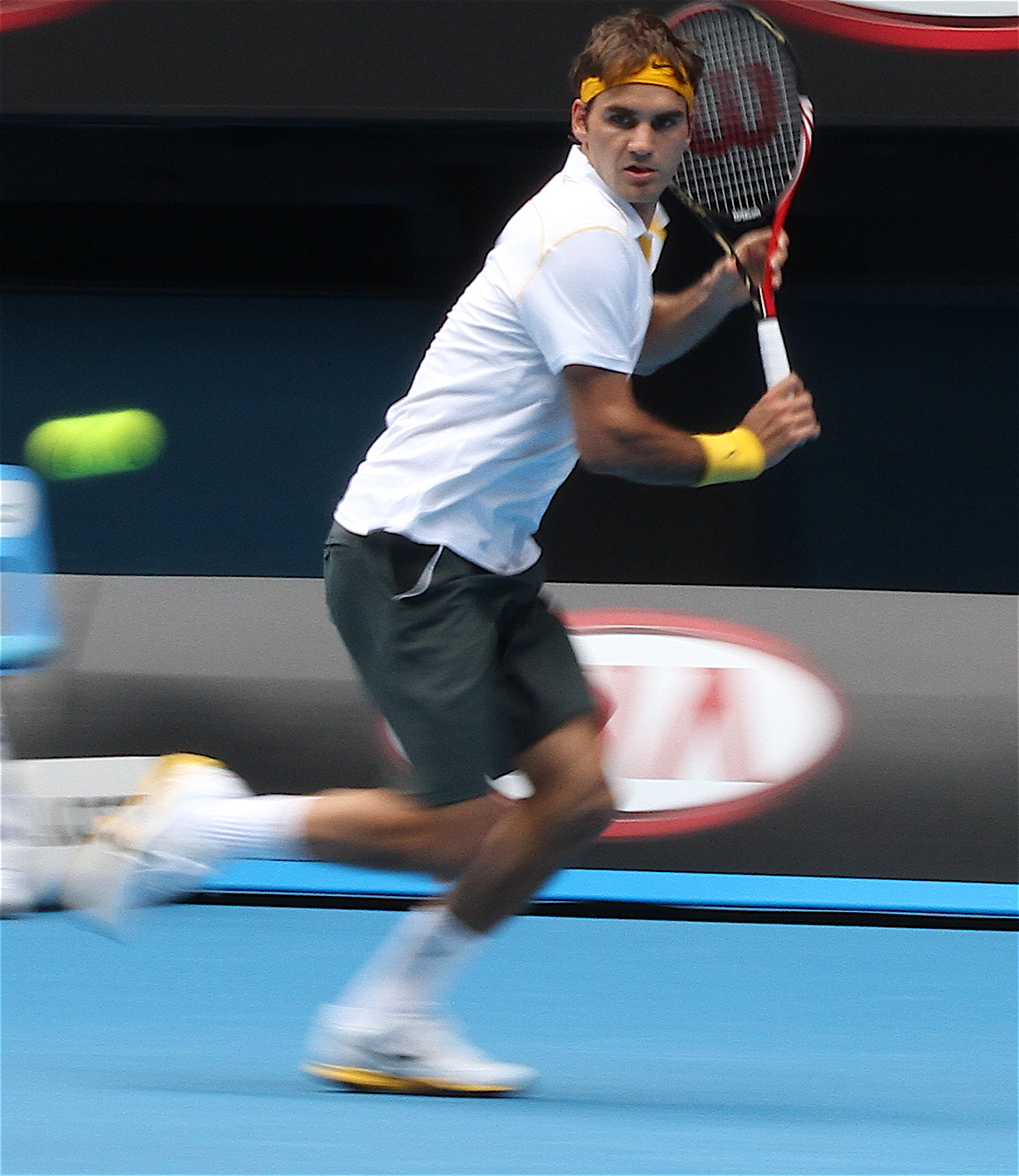
Roger Federer qualifies for the tenth time

On 3 September Roger Federer qualified for the World Tour Finals, after defeating Marin Čilić in the third round at the US Open, 6–3, 4–6, 6–4, 6–2, marking his tenth consecutive year in the finals.

Roger Federer began the year by winning the 2011 Qatar Open, defeating Nikolay Davydenko, 6–3, 6–3, without dropping a set in the tournament. This marks the 11th straight year that Federer won a singles title. Federer then reached the semifinals of the 2011 Australian Open, falling to Novak Djokovic, 6–7, 5–7, 4–6. He then reached his second final of the year at the 2011 Dubai Tennis Championships, losing to Djokovic, 3–6, 3–6. He then reached the semifinals of Indian Wells, Miami, and Madrid. At the 2011 French Open, Federer ended Djokovic's 43-match winning streak in the semifinals, 7–6, 6–3, 3–6, 7–6. However, he fell in the final to Rafael Nadal in four sets, 5–7, 6–7, 7–5, 1–6. At Wimbledon, the Swiss fell to Jo-Wilfried Tsonga in the quarterfinals, 6–3, 7–6, 4–6, 4–6, 4–6. This marks the first time that Federer fell after leading two sets to love in a Grand Slam. He then fell early in Montreal and Cincinnati. At the 2011 US Open, Federer reached the semifinals, falling to Djokovic after leading two sets to love and having two match points in the fifth set, 7–6, 6–4, 3–6, 2–6, 5–7. Federer won his second title of the year at the Swiss Indoors Basel ending his 10-month title drought. He defeated Japanese wildcard Kei Nishikori, 6–1, 6–3. The following week, Federer won his first BNP Paribas Masters title in Paris after defeating Jo-Wilfried Tsonga in straight sets, 6–1, 7–6.

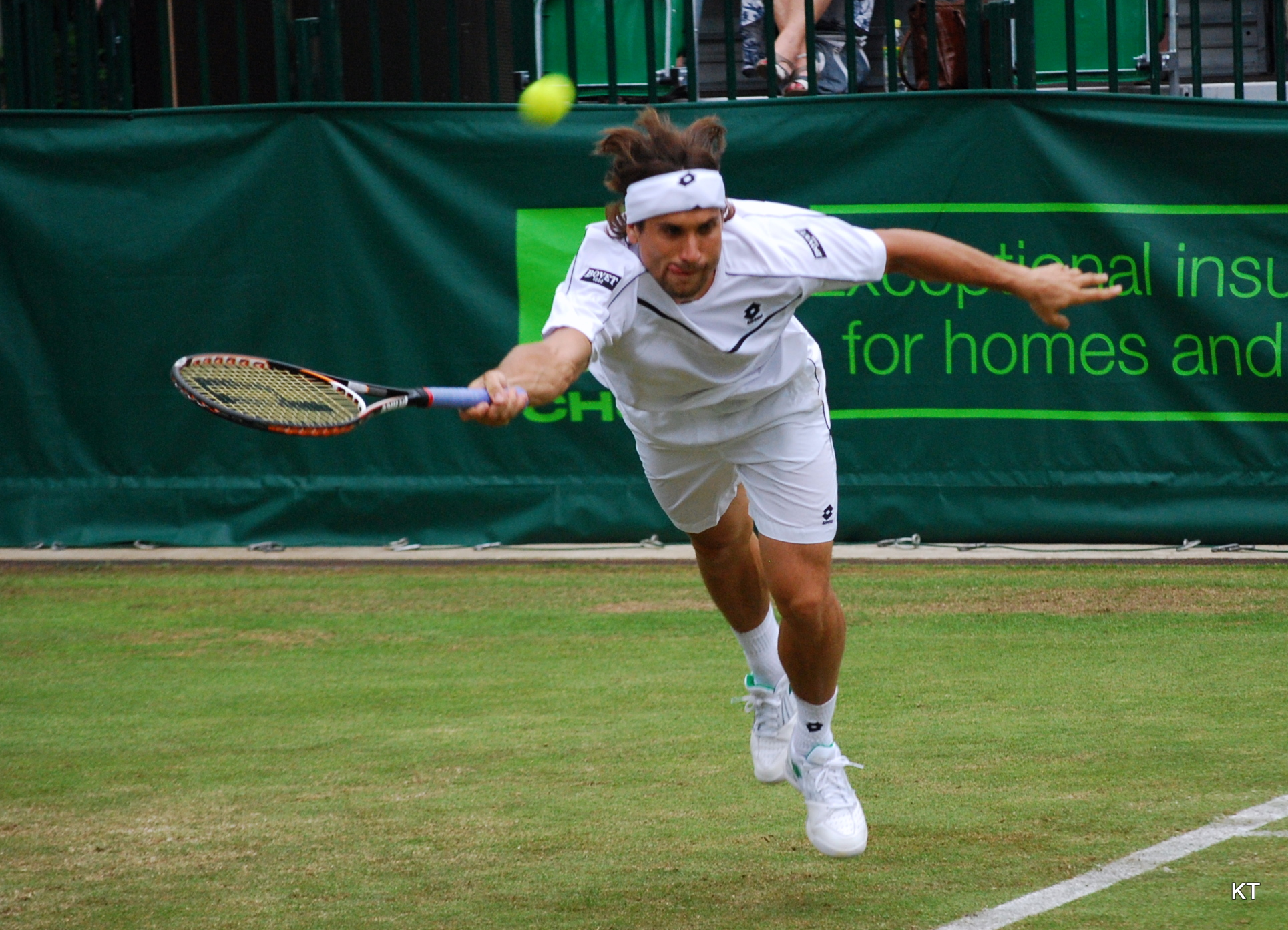
David Ferrer qualifies for the 3rd time

On 3 October David Ferrer qualified after advancing to the quarterfinals at the 2011 Shanghai Rolex Masters.

David Ferrer won two titles in the year, his first coming in the Heineken Open over David Nalbandian, 6–3, 6–2, and defending his title at the Abierto Mexicano Telcel, overcoming Nicolás Almagro, 7–6, 6–7, 6–2. He then reached his second Grand Slam semifinal and first since 2007 at the Australian Open, defeating top seed Rafael Nadal in the quarterfinals, 6–4, 6–2, 6–3, ending the seven-match winning streak of the Spaniard against him in his first straight-set win over Nadal. He then lost to Andy Murray, 6–4, 6–7, 1–6, 6–7. He also reached three other finals, at the Monte-Carlo Rolex Masters, where he lost in the final to Rafael Nadal, 4–6, 5–7, and at the Barcelona Open Banco Sabadell, 2–6, 4–6, also to Nadal. He did not lose a set approaching both finals. He also lost in the final of the Collector Swedish Open to Robin Söderling, 2–6, 2–6. Ferrer also reached the final at the 2011 Shanghai Rolex Masters, losing to Andy Murray. At the other Grand Slams, he reached the fourth round of the French Open, Wimbledon, and the US Open. This was the first time that he had reached at least the fourth round of each Grand Slam in one calendar year.

On 10 November Frenchman Jo-Wilfried Tsonga, Czech Tomáš Berdych and American Mardy Fish all qualified after Berdych defeated Janko Tipsarević, the last remaining contender, in the third round of the BNP Paribas Masters.

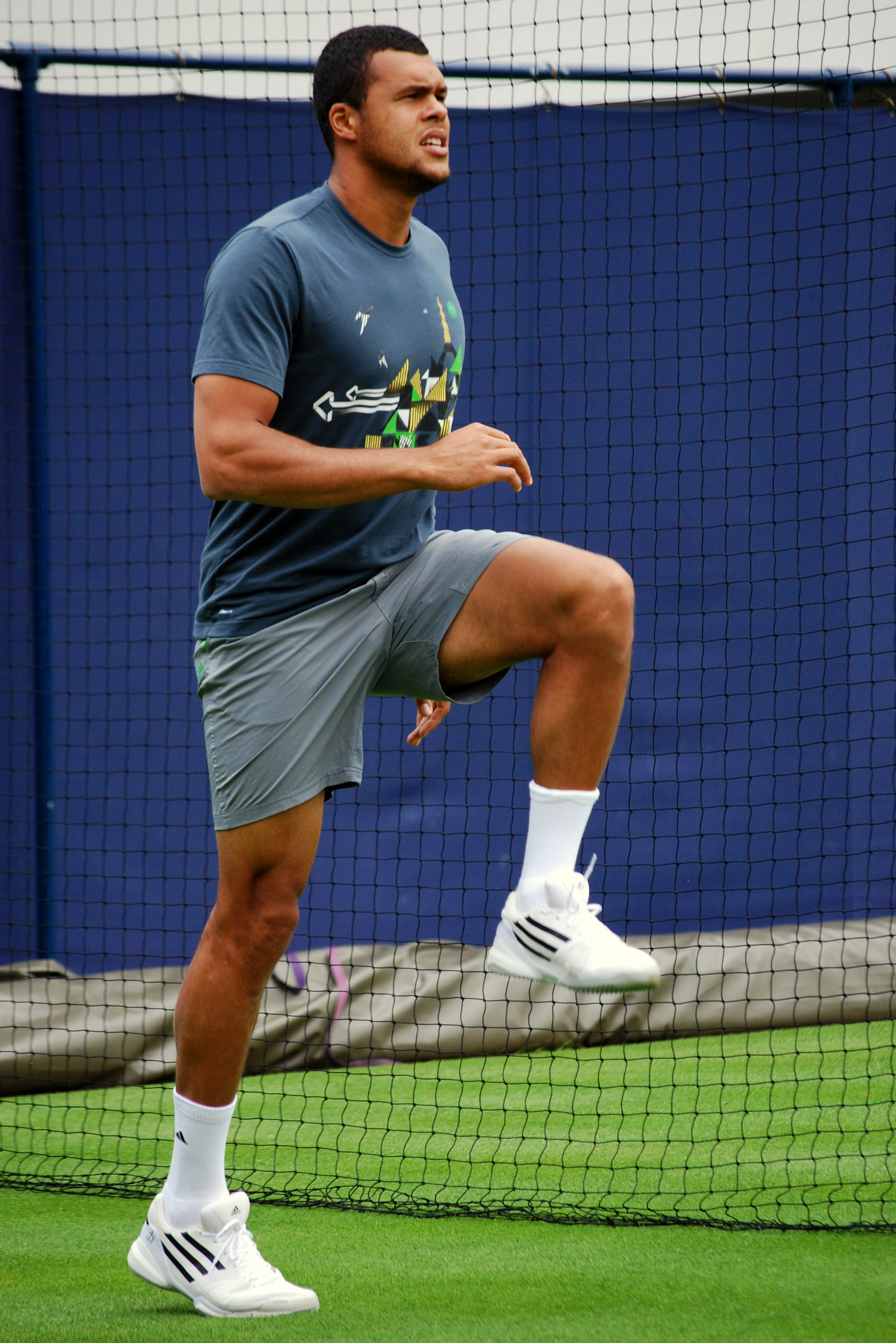
Jo-Wilfried Tsonga reaches the semifinals of Wimbledon

Jo-Wilfried Tsonga started the year having missed much of the end of the 2010 season because of injury. He reached the third round of the Australian Open and made his first final since October 2009 at the World Tennis Tournament in Rotterdam, where he lost to Robin Söderling 3–6, 6–3, 3–6. In May, he dropped out of the top 20 for the first time since January 2008. Tsonga then made his first grass-court final at the Aegon Championships in London, where he was defeated by Andy Murray, 6–3, 6–7, 4–6. He carried this form into Wimbledon, reaching the semifinals. He came from two sets to love behind to defeat Roger Federer in the quarterfinals, 3–6, 6–7, 6–4, 6–4, 6–4. At the US Open, he faced another quarterfinal against Federer, but this time was defeated. He then won two titles: his first in two years at the Open de Moselle over Ivan Ljubičić, 6–3, 6–7, 6–3 and the Erste Bank Open, this time defeating Juan Martín del Potro, 6–7, 6–3, 6–4, in the final. Jo also made the final of the 2011 BNP Paribas Masters in November for the second time, after winning in 2008. However, this time he was defeated by Roger Federer 1–6, 6–7. Tsonga was competing for the second time, having previously competed in 2008.

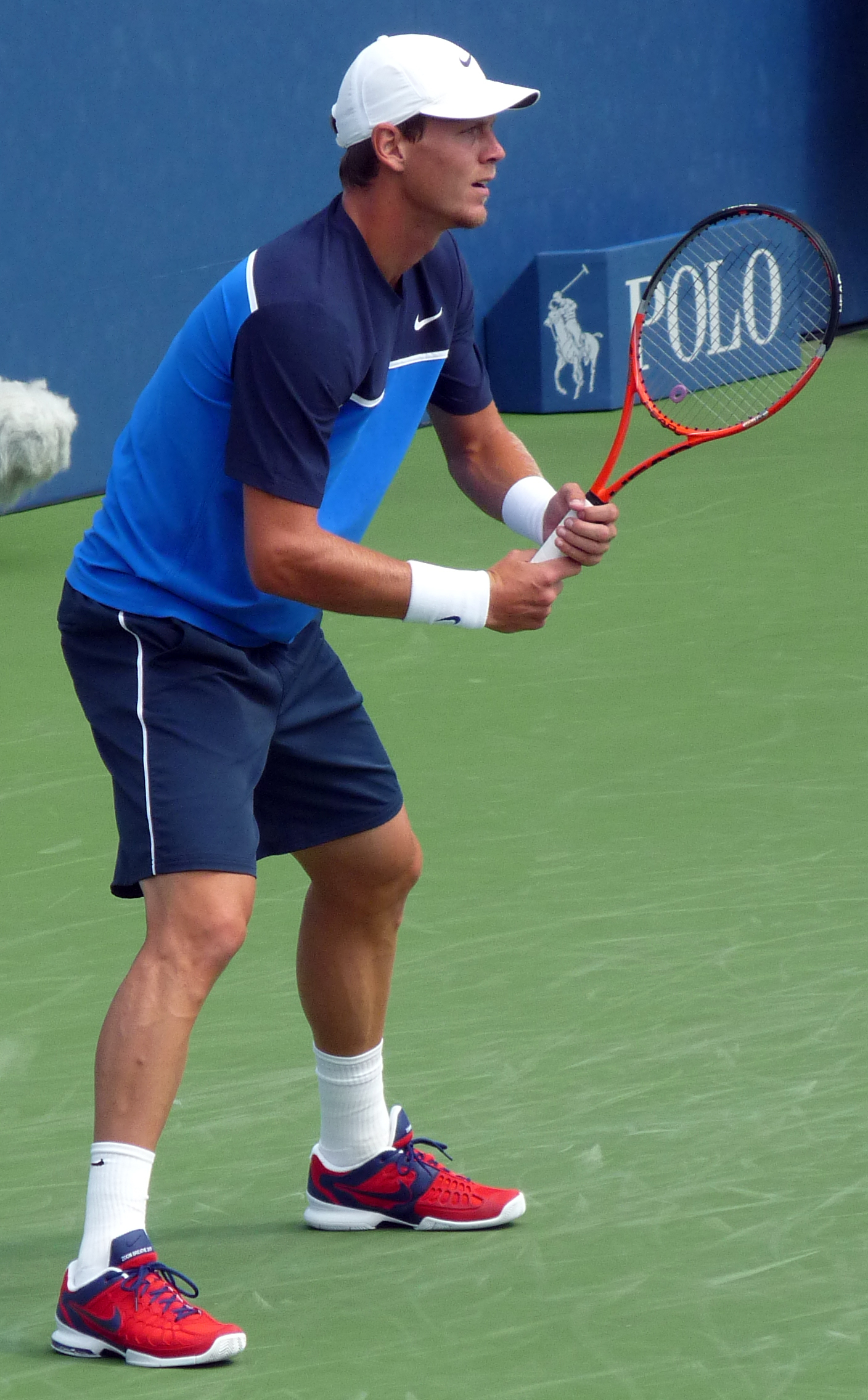
Tomáš Berdych wins the China Open

Tomáš Berdych's season was characterised by repeated appearances in Masters' quarter- and semifinals, with poorer performances at Grand Slams. He reached the quarterfinals of the Australian Open, defeated by eventual champion Novak Djokovic 1–6, 6–7, 1–6. After struggling with injuries in February, Berdych made a number of quarter- and semifinals in the clay and grass court seasons, but did not progress to any finals. At the French Open, Berdych suffered a shocking first-round loss to Stéphane Robert, 6–3, 6–3, 2–6, 2–6, 7–9, and was defeated 6–7, 4–6, 4–6 by Mardy Fish in the fourth round of Wimbledon. He also retired in the third round of the US Open against Janko Tipsarević while down 4–6, 0–5, due to a shoulder injury. Berdych reached his first final of the season at the China Open, where he faced Croatian Marin Čilić, defeating him 3–6, 6–4, 6–1. This was the sixth title of his career and his first title since the 2009 BMW Open. This was his second successive appearance at the ATP World Tour Finals.

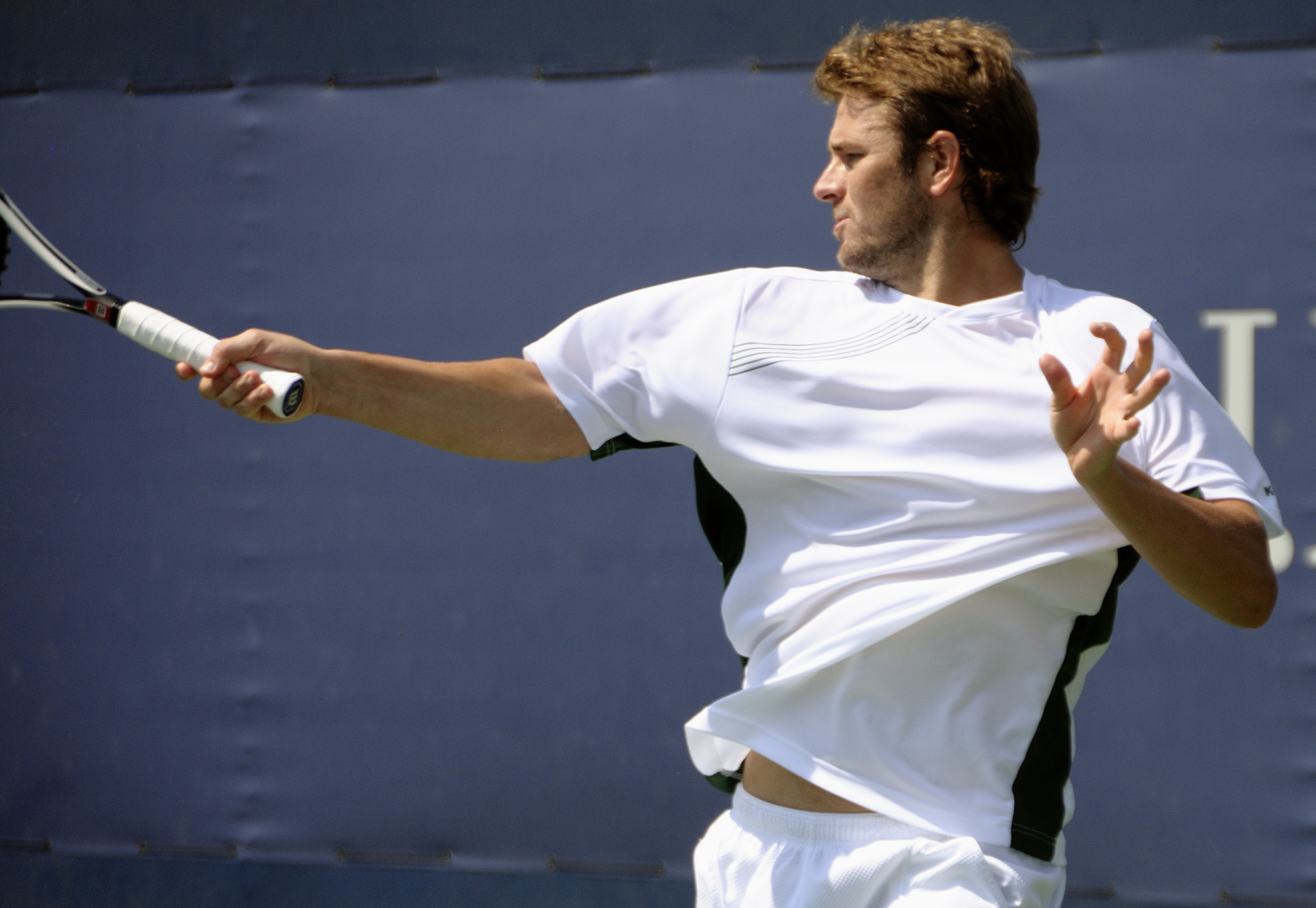
Mardy Fish enters the top 10

Mardy Fish had a breakthrough season by cracking the top 10 for the first time. He won the US Open Series by reaching three consecutive finals. His first final was at the Atlanta Tennis Championships, where he was the defending champion. He faced compatriot John Isner and defeated him 3–6, 7–6, 6–2. He then reached the final of the Farmers Classic, where he was upset by no. 84-ranked Ernests Gulbis 7–5, 4–6, 4–6. He then reached his fourth Masters final of his career at the Rogers Cup, but once again lost, this time to Novak Djokovic, 6–2, 3–6, 6–4, At the Grand Slams, he was upset by Tommy Robredo in the second round of the Australian Open 6–1, 3–6, 3–6, 3–6. He then fell in the third round of the French Open to Gilles Simon and the fourth round of the US Open to Jo-Wilfried Tsonga. He also reached his first Wimbledon quarterfinals, but lost to Rafael Nadal 3–6, 3–6, 7–5, 4–6. He was the only debutant at the event.

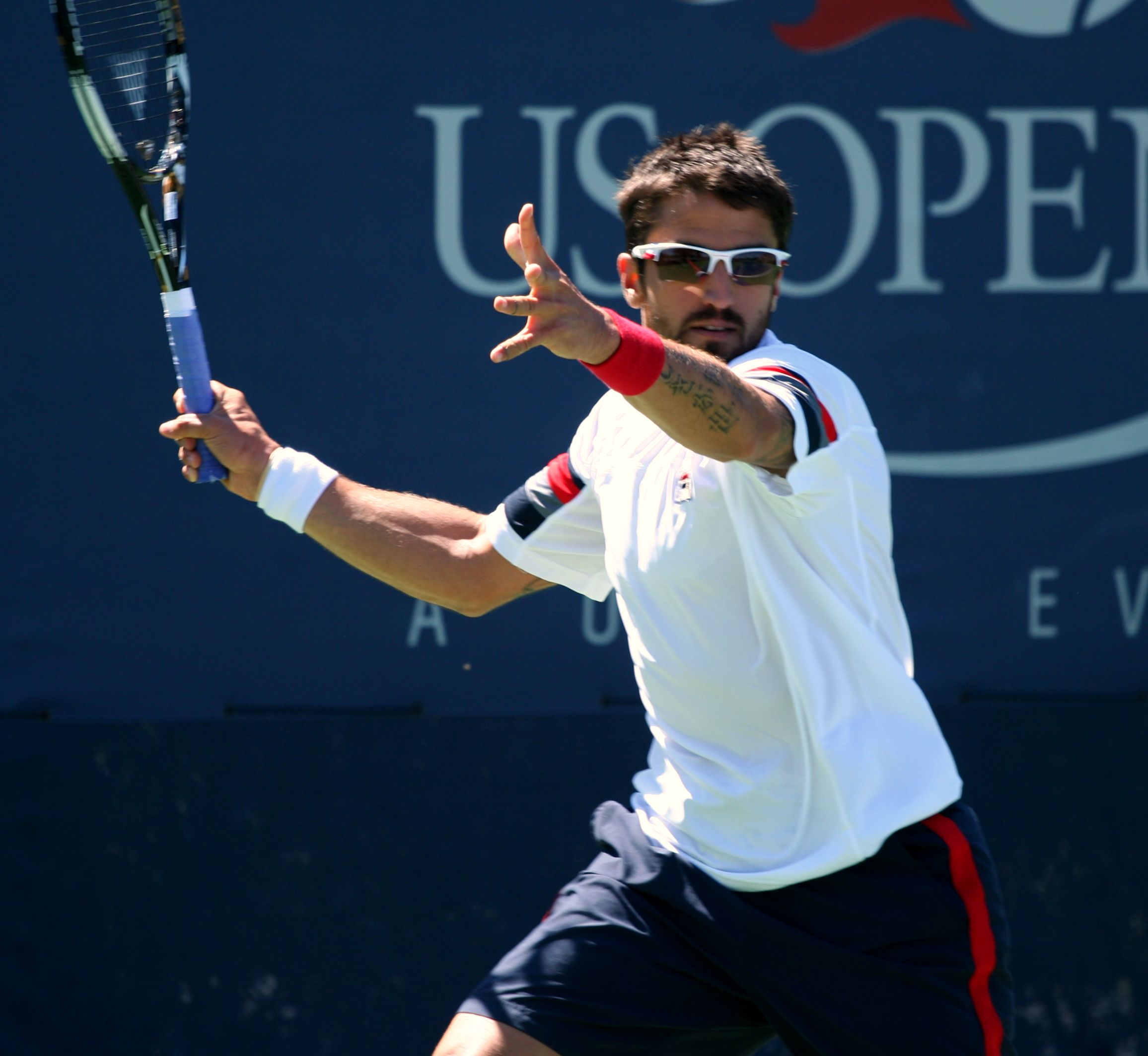
Janko Tipsarević won the all-Serbian final at the Kremlin Cup two weeks after his victory at the Malaysian Open

The first alternate for the Tour Finals was Serbian Janko Tipsarević, who had his best season so far, entering the top 10 and winning his first ATP World Tour title. He reached five finals in the year, the first coming in the Delray Beach International Tennis Championships, however he fell to Juan Martín del Potro 4–6, 4–6. He then reached the final of the Aegon International, where he faced Andreas Seppi but retired with a leg injury after being down 6–7, 6–3, 3–5 in a match delayed final. He then won his first career title at the Malaysian Open without losing a set, defeating Marcos Baghdatis 6–4, 7–5 in the final. He then won his second title at the Kremlin Cup, where he defeated compatriot Viktor Troicki 6–4, 6–2 in the first all-Serbian final. He then reached his second final in a row at the St. Petersburg Open, but this time fell to Marin Čilić 3–6, 6–3, 2–6. Tipsarević also reached his first Slam quarterfinal at the US Open where he retired against Novak Djokovic 6–7, 7–6, 0–6, 0–3 due to a thigh injury. The second alternate was Nicolás Almagro. The Spaniard had a breakthrough season, debuting in the top 10 and winning 3 titles in the year. At the South American Clay season, Almagro reached 3 consecutive final, first winning back-to-back titles at the Brasil Open defeating Alexandr Dolgopolov 6–3, 7–6 and Copa Claro over Juan Ignacio Chela 6–3, 3–6, 6–4. However he lost in the final of Abierto Mexicano Telcel to defending champion David Ferrer 6–7, 7–6, 2–6. His third title of the year came in the Open de Nice Côte d'Azur over Victor Hănescu 6–7, 6–3, 6–3. He reached his fifth final of the year at the International German Open, however he lost to Frenchman Gilles Simon 4–6, 6–4, 4–6.

=== Doubles ===
#	Player	Points	Tours	Date Qualified
1	Bob Bryan (USA); Mike Bryan (USA)	10,100	22	2 September
2	Michaël Llodra (FRA); Nenad Zimonjić (SRB)	7,300	18	2 September
3	Max Mirnyi (BLR); Daniel Nestor (CAN)	6,980	21	2 September
4	Mahesh Bhupathi (IND); Leander Paes (IND)	4,770	14	14 October
5	Rohan Bopanna (IND); Aisam-ul-Haq Qureshi (PAK)	4,650	25	6 November
6	Robert Lindstedt (SWE); Horia Tecău (ROU)	4,040	22	1 November
7	Jürgen Melzer (AUT); Philipp Petzschner (GER)	4,010	14	12 September
8	Mariusz Fyrstenberg (POL); Marcin Matkowski (POL)	3,450	25	10 November

On 2 September, the first top three teams qualified. The teams were Bob Bryan & Mike Bryan, and the newly formed teams of Nenad Zimonjić & Michaël Llodra, and Daniel Nestor & Max Mirnyi.

Bob Bryan and Mike Bryan started the year by making the final of the Medibank International Sydney losing to Dlouhý/Hanley in the final. They then made a hat-trick, winning their third Australian Open in a row and their fifth overall over Bhupathi/Paes 6–3, 6–4. They then made a good clay season reaching 4 consecutive finals winning 3 of them, the first coming in the US Men's Clay Court Championships over compatriots Isner/Querrey 6–7, 6–2, [10–5], they also won the Monte-Carlo Rolex Masters over Chela/Soares 6–3, 6–2, and finally in the Mutua Madrid Open 6–3, 6–3 over Llodra/Zimonjić. They however lost in the final of the Barcelona Open Banco Sabadell to González/Lipsky 5–7, 6–2, [12–10]. They then had a perfect grass season winning both in the Aegon Championships over Bhupathi/Paes 6–7, 7–6, [10–6] and their 11th Slam at the Wimbledon over Lindstedt/Tecău 6–3, 6–4, 7–6. They reached their 9th final of the year at the Rogers Cup to Llodra/Zimonjić 6–4, 6–7, [10–5]. At the US Open they lost in the first round of a Slam since Australian Open in 2001, they lost to Karlović/Moser 6–4, 2–6, 6–2. They then won back-to-back titles at the Erste Bank Open defeating Mirnyi/Daniel Nestor 7–6, 6–3 in the final and at the Valencia Open 500 defeating Butorac/Rojer 6–4, 7–6.

Michaël Llodra and Nenad Zimonjić paired up for the third time after an 8-year hiatus. They reached their first final at the ABN AMRO World Tennis Tournament, however they fell to the team of Melzer/Petzschner 4–6, 6–3, [5–10]. They then reached the final of the Mutua Madrid Open losing to Bryan/Bryan 3–6, 3–6. They had a good run at the US Open Series as they claimed their first titles back-to-back as a team and reached 3 consecutive finals. They won in the Legg Mason Tennis Classic in a close three setter over Lindstedt/Tecău 6–7, 7–6, [10–7] and in the Rogers Cup over Bryan/Bryan 6–4, 6–7, [10–5]. They reached their 3 final in a row at the Western & Southern Open losing to Bhupathi/Paes 6–7, 6–7. They claimed their third title of the year at the China Open once again over Lindstedt/Tecău in two tie-break sets 7–6, 7–6. They then reached their 7th final of the year at the Shanghai Rolex Masters losing to Mirnyi/Nestor 6–1, 1–6, [10–12]. They then defeated Mirnyi/Nestor in the final of the Swiss Indoors Basel 6–4, 7–5. Zimonjić also finished runner-up at the French Open Mixed Doubles with Katarina Srebotnik losing to Dellacqua/Lipsky 6–7, 6–4, [7–10].

Max Mirnyi and Daniel Nestor played for the first time this year. Their first title as a team came in the Regions Morgan Keegan Championships over Butorac/Rojer 6–2, 6–7, [10–3]. However, their major triumph came in the French Open claiming their first Slam, triumphing over surprise finalists Cabal/Schwank 7–6, 3–6, 6–4 in the final. They also reached the final of the Sony Ericsson Open falling to the Indian pair of Bhupathi/Paes 6–7, 6–2, [10–5]. They then won their second Masters 1000 title at the Shanghai Rolex Masters 3–6, 6–1, [12–10] defeating the French-Serb pair of Llodra/Zimonjić in the final. They then reached back-to-back finals at the Erste Bank Open and Swiss Indoors Basel but end up in the losing side to Bryan/Bryan 6–7, 3–6 and to Llodra/Zimonjić 4–6, 5–7, respectively. Nestor also claimed the Mixed Doubles title Australian Open with Katarina Srebotnik defeating Hanley/Chan in the final.

On 13 September 2011, after claiming the US Open, Jürgen Melzer & Philipp Petzschner were announced as the fourth qualifiers.

Jürgen Melzer and Philipp Petzschner claimed their second slam as a team at the US Open, making it the second year in a row that they have claimed a slam. At the open, they defeated the Polish team of Fyrstenberg/Matkowski in the final 6–2, 6–2. They also won titles in the ABN AMRO World Tennis Tournament over Llodra/Zimonjić 6–4, 3–6, [10–5] and their 5th career title as a team at the MercedesCup over the Spanish team of Granollers/López 6–3, 6–4 in the final. Melzer also won the Mixed Doubles title at the Wimbledon with Iveta Benešová defeating the team of Bhupathi/Vesnina 6–3, 6–2 in the final.

On 14 October, the team of Mahesh Bhupathi & Leander Paes were the fifth team to qualify after reaching the semi-finals of the Shanghai Rolex Masters.

Mahesh Bhupathi and Leander Paes, the Indian pair teamed for the first time since 2002. They won their first title of the year at their home tournament, the Aircel Chennai Open defeating Haase/Martin 6–2, 6–7, [10–7]. They then reached the final of the Australian Open losing to Bryan/Bryan 3–6, 4–6. They also reached the final of the Sony Ericsson Open where they defeated the team of Minryi/Nestor 6–7, 6–2, [10–5]. They then reached the final of the Aegon Championships where they faced Bryan/Bryan in the final but end up losing 7–6, 6–7, [6–10]. They then claimed their third total of the year at the Western & Southern Open defeating Llodra/Zimonjić in two close sets, 7–6, 7–6. Bhupathi also finished runner-up at the Mixed Doubles of Wimbledon with Elena Vesnina losing to Melzer/Benešová 3–6, 2–6.

On 1 November, the pair of Swede Robert Lindstedt & Romanian Horia Tecău were announced as sixth team to qualify.

Robert Lindstedt and Horia Tecău started the year by reaching the final of the Brisbane International but had to retire after losing the first set 6–4 against Dlouhý/Hanley. They then won their first title of the year at the Grand Prix Hassan II defeating Fleming/Zelenay 6–2, 6–1. They then finished runners-up at the UNICEF Open losing to Bracciali/Čermák 3–6, 6–2, [8–10]. They then reached their second Slam final as a team at Wimbledon, but once again fell, this time to top seeds Bryan/Bryan 3–6, 4–6, 6–7. They then claimed their second title of the year at the Collector Swedish Open defeating the Swedish pair of Aspelin/Siljeström 6–3, 6–3. They then reached the final of the Legg Mason Tennis Classic falling to the team of Llodra/Zimonjić in three tight sets 7–6, 6–7, [7–10]. They also reached the final of the China Open once again losing to Llodra/Zimonjić this time in two tie-break sets 6–7, 6–7. Tecău also won two other titles in the year with different partners, at the PBZ Zagreb Indoors with Dick Norman defeating the team of Granollers/López 6–3, 6–4 in the final. He then teamed up with compatriot Victor Hănescu to win the Abierto Mexicano Telcel over the Brazilian team of Melo/Soares 6–1, 6–3.

On 6 November, Rohan Bopanna and Aisam-ul-Haq Qureshi known as the 'Indo-Pak Express' were announced as the seventh qualifier.

Rohan Bopanna and Aisam-ul-Haq Qureshi, who were playing for the second year, had won two titles as a team in the year. Their first title came in the Gerry Weber Open, defeating Haase and Raonic 7–6, 3–6, [11–9] in the final. They then won the If Stockholm Open over Melo/Soares 6–1, 6–3 in the final. Qureshi also won another title with Oliver Marach at the PTT Thailand Open against the German team of Kohlmann/Waske in two close sets 7–6, 7–6. They then won their biggest title at the BNP Paribas Masters over the French team of Benneteau/Mahut 6–2, 6–4.

On 10 November, the Polish team of Mariusz Fyrstenberg and Marcin Matkowski secured the eighth and final team spot.

Mariusz Fyrstenberg and Marcin Matkowski were the only team not to win a title in the ATP World Tour, which meant that they needed to win the event to continue their streak since 2003 to win at least one doubles title. However, they won an ATP Challenger event at the BNP Paribas Polish Open. Their biggest triumph came in the US Open, where they reached their first Slam final as a team and as individuals, however they lost to the team of Melzer/Petzschner 6–2, 6–2.

== Contenders points breakdown ==
=== Singles ===
Rank	Athlete	Grand Slam				ATP World Tour Masters 1000								ATP 500				ATP 250		Total points	Tours
Rank	Athlete	AO	FO	W	USO	IW	MI	MA	RO	CA	CI	SH	PA	1	2	3	4	5	6	Total points	Tours
1	(Serbia) Novak Djokovic*	W 2,000	SF; 720	W 2,000	W 2,000	W 1,000	W 1,000	W 1,000	W 1,000	W 1,000	F 600	A 0	QF; 180	W 500	SF; 180	- 0	- 0	W 250	DC; 45	13,475	17
2	(Spain) Rafael Nadal*	QF; 360	W 2,000	F 1,200	F 1,200	F 600	F 600	F 600	F 600	R32; 10	QF; 180	R16; 90	A 0	W 1,000	W 500	F 300	- 0	SF; 90	QF; 45	9,375	18
3	(United Kingdom) Andy Murray*	F 1,200	SF; 720	SF; 720	SF; 720	R64; 10	R64; 10	R16; 90	SF; 360	R32; 10	W 1,000	W 1,000	QF; 180	W 500	SF; 360	R32; 0	- 0	W 250	W 250	7,380	17
4	(Switzerland) Roger Federer*	SF; 720	F 1,200	QF; 360	SF; 720	SF; 360	SF; 360	SF; 360	R16; 90	R16; 90	QF; 180	A 0	W 1,000	W 500	F 300	QF; 180	- 0	W 250		6,670	17
5	(Spain) David Ferrer*	SF; 720	R16; 180	R16; 180	R16; 180	R64; 10	QF; 180	QF; 180	A 0	A 0	R16; 90	F 600	QF; 180	F 600	W 500	F 300	SF; 180	W 250	F 150	4,480	21
6	(France) Jo-Wilfried Tsonga*	R32; 90	R32; 90	SF; 720	QF; 360	R64; 10	R32; 45	R16; 90	R32; 45	SF; 360	R32; 45	R32; 10	F 600	SF; 180	F 300	R32; 45	R16; 45	W 250	W 250	3,535	23
7	(Czech Republic) Tomáš Berdych*	QF; 360	R128; 10	R16; 180	R32; 90	R16; 90	QF; 180	QF; 180	QF; 180	QF; 180	SF; 360	R16; 90	SF; 360	W 500	SF; 180	QF; 90	R16; 90	DC; 310	W 250	3,300	22
8	(United States) Mardy Fish*	R64; 45	R32; 90	QF; 360	R16; 180	R64; 10	SF; 360	R16; 90	R64; 10	F 600	SF; 360	R32; 10	R16; 90	SF; 180	SF; 180	R32; 0	- 0	W 250	F 150	2,965	22
Alternate
9	(Serbia) Janko Tipsarević	R64; 45	R32; 90	R128; 10	QF; 360	R64; 10	R64; 10	SF; 90	A 0	SF; 600	R32; 45	R64; 10	R16; 90	F 150	F 150	F 150	QF; 90	W 250	W 250	2,395	22
10	(Spain) Nicolás Almagro	R16; 180	R128; 10	R32; 90	R128; 10	R32; 45	R32; 45	R16; 10	R64; 90	QF; 180	R16; 90	R16; 90	R32; 10	F 300	F 300	W 250	SF; 180	W 250	W 250	2,380	26

- Ranking points in italics are those who replace 500 events.

=== Doubles ===
Rank	Team	Points																		Total Points	Tourn
Rank	Team	1	2	3	4	5	6	7	8	9	10	11	12	13	14	15	16	17	18	Total Points	Tourn
1	Bob Bryan (USA); Mike Bryan (USA)	W 2000	W 2000	W 1000	W 1000	SF; 720	F 600	W 500	SF; 360	F 300	W 250	W 250	W 250	SF; 180	QF; 180	QF; 180	F 150	R16; 90	R16; 90	10,100	22
2	Michaël Llodra (FRA); Nenad Zimonjić (SRB)	W 1000	SF; 720	SF; 720	F 600	F 600	F 600	W 500	W 500	W 500	QF; 360	F 300	SF; 180	QF; 180	QF; 180	QF; 180	R16; 180	R16; 0	R16; 0	7,300	18
3	Max Mirnyi (BLR); Daniel Nestor (CAN)	W 2000	W 1000	SF; 720	F 600	W 500	SF; 360	SF; 360	F 300	QF; 180	QF; 180	SF; 180	F 150	SF; 90	SF; 90	R32; 90	R32; 90	QF; 90	R32; 0	6,980	21
4	Mahesh Bhupathi (IND); Leander Paes (IND)	F 1200	W 1,000	W 1,000	SF; 360	QF; 360	W 250	F 150	QF; 90	R16; 90	R32; 90	R32; 90	QF; 90	R16; 0	R16; 0	R16; 0				4,770	15
5	Rohan Bopanna (IND); Aisam-ul-Haq Qureshi (PAK)	W 1000	SF; 720	SF; 360	QF; 360	SF; 360	W 250	W 250	R16; 180	QF; 180	QF; 180	QF; 180	QF; 180	SF; 90	SF; 90	QF; 90	QF; 90	QF; 45	QF; 45	4,650	25
6	Robert Lindstedt (SWE); Horia Tecău (ROU)	F 1200	QF; 360	QF; 360	F 300	F 300	W 250	W 250	QF; 180	QF; 180	QF; 180	F 150	F 150	QF; 90	QF; 45	QF; 45	R16; 0	R16; 0	R16; 0	4,040	23
7	Jürgen Melzer (AUT); Philipp Petzschner (GER)	W 2000	W 500	QF; 360	QF; 360	SF; 360	W 250	R16; 90	SF; 90	R16; 0	R16; 0	R16; 0	R16; 0	R16; 0	R16; 0					4,010	14
8	Mariusz Fyrstenberg (POL); Marcin Matkowski (POL)	F 1,200	QF; 360	SF; 360	SF; 360	QF; 180	QF; 180	QF; 180	QF; 180	W 125	SF; 90	QF; 90	QF; 90	DC; 45	R16; 0	R64; 0	R64; 0	R16; 0	R32; 0	3,450	25

== Groupings ==
=== Singles ===
Group A was led by world no. 1 Novak Djokovic and Australian Open runner-up Andy Murray. They were joined by Spaniard David Ferrer and Czech Tomáš Berdych. Against the rest of the group, top seed Novak Djokovic was 19–9, third seed Andy Murray was 10–12, fifth seed David Ferrer was 12–13, and seventh seed Tomáš Berdych was 6–13.

Djokovic had a good record against each member of his group. He was 6–4 against Murray and 2–1 in the year, with Murray winning their last encounter at the final of the Western & Southern Open 6–4, 3–0 ret., and Djokovic winning in Internazionali BNL d'Italia semifinal 6–1, 3–6, 7–6 and Australian Open final 6–4, 6–2, 6–3. Djokovic was also 6–4 against Ferrer, winning their only encounter in 2011 at the Mutua Madrid Open 6–4, 4–6, 6–3. He was 7–1 against Berdych, winning their last five encounters including three in the year, with his last win coming in the Western & Southern Open semifinal 7–5 ret. Murray led Ferrer by 5–3 and won their three encounters in 2011 including the final of the Shanghai Rolex Masters 7–5, 6–4. However, Murray trailed Berdych 1–3, with Murray's last win coming in 2005 and Berdych winning their only match-up in 2011 at the BNP Paribas Masters 4–6, 7–6, 6–4. In the last head-to-head of the group Ferrer led Berdych 5–2 and won the last four with the last encounter coming in 2010 at the Malaysian Open 4–6, 7–5, 6–4.

Group B was led by the French Open champion and 10-time Slam champion Rafael Nadal, and 16-time Slam champion and French Open runner-up Roger Federer. They were joined by Frenchman Jo-Wilfried Tsonga and the only debutant American, Mardy Fish. Against the rest of the group, no. 2 seed Rafael Nadal was 30–11, no. 4 seed Roger Federer was 20–21, no. 6 seed Jo-Wilfried Tsonga was 6–12, and no. 8 seed Mardy Fish was 2–14.

Like Djokovic, Nadal had a great record against each of Group B members. Nadal led Federer 17–8, including all three encounters in the year, the last being at the final of the French Open 7–5, 7–6, 5–7, 6–1. He was 6–2 against Tsonga, splitting their encounters in 2011, Tsonga winning in the Aegon Championships 6–7, 6–4, 6–1 and Nadal winning in the Davis Group semifinal between Spain and France 6–0, 6–2, 6–4. Nadal led Fish 7–1, meeting three times in the year with Nadal winning in Wimbledon 6–3, 6–3, 5–7, 6–4, Fish' only win coming in the Western & Southern Open 6–3, 6–4, and Nadal winning in the Toray Pan Pacific Open 7–5, 6–1. Federer led Tsonga 6–3, and met six times in 2011 win Federer winning four of them, and the last coming in the final of the BNP Paribas Masters, Federer prevailing 6–1, 7–6. Federer led Fish 6–1, with their last match coming in 2010 in the final of the Western & Southern Financial Group Masters with Federer winning 6–7, 7–6, 6–4. Tsonga led Fish by 1–0, with their only encounter coming in the fourth round of the 2011 US Open 6–4, 6–7, 3–6, 6–4, 6–2.

=== Doubles ===
Group A:

- Bob Bryan & Mike Bryan
- Mahesh Bhupathi & Leander Paes
- Robert Lindstedt & Horia Tecău
- Jürgen Melzer & Philipp Petzschner

Group B:

- Michaël Llodra & Nenad Zimonjić
- Max Mirnyi & Daniel Nestor
- Rohan Bopanna & Aisam-ul-Haq Qureshi
- Mariusz Fyrstenberg & Marcin Matkowski

== Head-to-heads ==
These were the head-to-heads before the tournament.

=== 2011 ATP World Tour Finals – Singles ===
		Djokovic	Nadal	Murray	Federer	Ferrer	Tsonga	Berdych	Fish	Overall	YTD W–L
1	(Serbia) Novak Djokovic		13–16	6–4	10–14	6–5	4–5	8–1	7–0	53–44	69–4
2	(Spain) Rafael Nadal	16–13		13–5	17–9	13–4	6–3	10–3	8–1	82–36	66–13
3	(United Kingdom) Andy Murray (Serbia) Janko Tipsarević	4–6; 1–3	5–13; 0–2		8–6; 0–4	5–4; 1–2	5–1; 0–0	1–3; 4–2	4–4; 4–1	32–36; 9–13	56–12; 53–25
4	(Switzerland) Roger Federer	14–10	9–17	6–8		12–0	8–3	10–4	7–1	61–43	59–12
5	(Spain) David Ferrer	5–6	4–13	4–5	0–12		1–1	5–3	4–4	21–42	56–17
6	(France) Jo-Wilfried Tsonga	5–4	3–6	1–5	3–8	1–1		1–1	2–0	13–23	52–22
7	(Czech Republic) Tomáš Berdych	1–8	3–10	3–1	4–10	3–5	1–1		0–1	14–34	51–21
8	(United States) Mardy Fish	0–7	1–8	4–4	1–7	4–4	0–2	1–0		11–29	43–22

=== 2011 ATP World Tour Finals – Doubles ===
		Bryan; Bryan	Llodra; Zimonjić	Mirnyi; Nestor	Bhupathi; Paes	Bopanna; Qureshi	Lindstedt; Tecău	Melzer; Petzschner	Fyrstenberg; Matkowski	Overall	YTD W–L
1	(United States) Bob Bryan / (United States) Mike Bryan		2–2	1–0	3–2	5–1	1–0	4–0	14–7	30–12	58–14
2	(France) Michaël Llodra / (Serbia) Nenad Zimonjić	2–2		3–2	0–3	3–1	3–0	0–1	3–0	14–9	45–14
3	(Belarus) Max Mirnyi / (Canada) Daniel Nestor	0–1	2–3		1–3	0–2	4–1	1–0	1–0	9–10	42–19
4	(India) Mahesh Bhupathi / (India) Leander Paes	2–3	3–0	3–1		0–1	0–0	0–0	0–1	8–6	30–12
5	(India) Rohan Bopanna / (Pakistan) Aisam-ul-Haq Qureshi	1–5	1–3	2–0	1–0		0–3	0–1	2–2	7–14	38–23
6	(Sweden) Robert Lindstedt / (Romania) Horia Tecău	0–1	0–3	1–4	0–0	3–0		0–1	1–0	5–9	38–21
7	(Austria) Jürgen Melzer / (Germany) Philipp Petzschner	0–4	1–0	0–1	0–0	1–0	1–0		1–1	4–6	26–11
8	(Poland) Mariusz Fyrstenberg / (Poland) Marcin Matkowski	7–14	0–3	0–1	1–0	2–2	0–1	1–1		11–22	19–26

== Day-by-day summaries ==
=== Day 1 (20 November) ===
Matches on O_{2} arena
Group	Winner	Loser	Score
Doubles – Group B	(Belarus) Max Mirnyi [3] (Canada) Daniel Nestor [3]	(India) Rohan Bopanna [5] (Pakistan) Aisam-ul-Haq Qureshi [5]	7–6^{(7–2)}, 4–6, [11–9]
Singles – Group B	(Switzerland) Roger Federer [4]	(France) Jo-Wilfried Tsonga [6]	6–2, 2–6, 6–4
Doubles – Group B	(Poland) Mariusz Fyrstenberg [8] (Poland) Marcin Matkowski [8]	(France) Michaël Llodra [2] (Serbia) Nenad Zimonjić [2]	6–4, 5–7, [11–9]
Singles – Group B	(Spain) Rafael Nadal [2]	(United States) Mardy Fish [8]	6–2, 3–6, 7–6^{(7–3)}

=== Day 2 (21 November) ===
Matches on O_{2} arena
Group	Winner	Loser	Score
Doubles – Group A	(Sweden) Robert Lindstedt [6] (Romania) Horia Tecău [6]	(India) Mahesh Bhupathi [4] (India) Leander Paes [4]	7–6^{(8–6)}, 6–1
Singles – Group A	(Spain) David Ferrer [5]	(United Kingdom) Andy Murray [3]	6–4, 7–5
Doubles – Group A	(United States) Bob Bryan [1] (United States) Mike Bryan [1]	(Austria) Jürgen Melzer [7] (Germany) Philipp Petzschner [7]	6–7^{(4–7)}, 7–5, [10–7]
Singles – Group A	(Serbia) Novak Djokovic [1]	(Czech Republic) Tomáš Berdych [7]	3–6, 6–3, 7–6^{(7–3)}

=== Day 3 (22 November) ===
Matches on O_{2} arena
Group	Winner	Loser	Score
Doubles – Group B	(France) Michaël Llodra [2] (Serbia) Nenad Zimonjić [2]	(India) Rohan Bopanna [5] (Pakistan) Aisam-ul-Haq Qureshi [5]	7–6^{(8–6)}, 6–3
Singles – Group B	(France) Jo-Wilfried Tsonga [6]	(United States) Mardy Fish [8]	7–6^{(7–4)}, 6–1
Doubles – Group B	(Belarus) Max Mirnyi [3] (Canada) Daniel Nestor [3]	(Poland) Mariusz Fyrstenberg [8] (Poland) Marcin Matkowski [8]	6–4, 6–3
Singles – Group B	(Switzerland) Roger Federer [4]	(Spain) Rafael Nadal [2]	6–3, 6–0

=== Day 4 (23 November) ===
Matches on O_{2} arena
Group	Winner	Loser	Score
Doubles – Group A	(India) Mahesh Bhupathi [4] (India) Leander Paes [4]	(Austria) Jürgen Melzer [7] (Germany) Philipp Petzschner [7]	7–5, 6–3
Singles – Group A	(Czech Republic) Tomáš Berdych [7]	(Serbia) Janko Tipsarević [9/ALT]	2–6, 6–3, 7–6^{(8–6)}
Doubles – Group A	(United States) Bob Bryan [1] (United States) Mike Bryan [1]	(Sweden) Robert Lindstedt [6] (Romania) Horia Tecău [6]	6–1, 6–2
Singles – Group A	(Spain) David Ferrer [5]	(Serbia) Novak Djokovic [1]	6–3, 6–1

=== Day 5 (24 November) ===
Matches on O_{2} arena
Group	Winner	Loser	Score
Doubles – Group B	(Poland) Mariusz Fyrstenberg [8] (Poland) Marcin Matkowski [8]	(India) Rohan Bopanna [5] (Pakistan) Aisam-ul-Haq Qureshi [5]	6–2, 6–1
Singles – Group B	(Switzerland) Roger Federer [4]	(United States) Mardy Fish [8]	6–1, 3–6, 6–3
Doubles – Group B	(Belarus) Max Mirnyi [3] (Canada) Daniel Nestor [3]	(France) Michaël Llodra [2] (Serbia) Nenad Zimonjić [2]	4–6, 6–3, [10–7]
Singles – Group B	(France) Jo-Wilfried Tsonga [6]	(Spain) Rafael Nadal [2]	7–6^{(7–2)}, 4–6, 6–3

=== Day 6 (25 November) ===
Matches on O_{2} arena
Group	Winner	Loser	Score
Doubles – Group A	(Austria) Jürgen Melzer [7] (Germany) Philipp Petzschner [7]	(Sweden) Robert Lindstedt [6] (Romania) Horia Tecău [6]	6–3, 6–4
Singles – Group A	(Serbia) Janko Tipsarević [9/ALT]	(Serbia) Novak Djokovic [1]	3–6, 6–3, 6–3
Doubles – Group A	(India) Mahesh Bhupathi [4] (India) Leander Paes [4]	(United States) Bob Bryan [1] (United States) Mike Bryan [1]	6–4, 6–2
Singles – Group A	(Czech Republic) Tomáš Berdych [7]	(Spain) David Ferrer [5]	3–6, 7–5, 6–1

=== Day 7 (26 November) ===
Matches on O_{2} arena
Group	Winner	Loser	Score
Doubles – Semifinal	(Belarus) Max Mirnyi [3] (Canada) Daniel Nestor [3]	(United States) Bob Bryan [1] (United States) Mike Bryan [1]	7–6^{(8–6)}, 6–4
Singles – Semifinal	(Switzerland) Roger Federer [4]	(Spain) David Ferrer [5]	7–5, 6–3
Doubles – Semifinal	(Poland) Mariusz Fyrstenberg [8] (Poland) Marcin Matkowski [8]	(India) Mahesh Bhupathi [4] (India) Leander Paes [4]	6–4, 4–6, [10–6]
Singles – Semifinal	(France) Jo-Wilfried Tsonga [6]	(Czech Republic) Tomáš Berdych [7]	6–3, 7–5

=== Day 8 (27 November) ===
Matches on O_{2} arena
Group	Winner	Loser	Score
Doubles – Final	(Belarus) Max Mirnyi [3] (Canada) Daniel Nestor [3]	(Poland) Mariusz Fyrstenberg [8] (Poland) Marcin Matkowski [8]	7–5, 6–3
Singles – Final	(Switzerland) Roger Federer [4]	(France) Jo-Wilfried Tsonga [6]	6–3, 6–7^{(6–8)}, 6–3

== See also ==
- ATP points system
- 2011 WTA Tour Championships
- 2011 ATP Challenger Tour Finals
