= 2011 ATP World Tour Finals – Singles =

Singles
- 2011 ATP World Tour Finals

Final
- Champion: (Switzerland) Roger Federer
- Runner-up: (France) Jo-Wilfried Tsonga
- Score: 6–3, 6–7^{(6–8)}, 6–3

Events
Singles	Doubles
← 2010 ·	ATP World Tour Finals	· 2012 →

Defending champion Roger Federer defeated Jo-Wilfried Tsonga in the final, 6–3, 6–7^{(6–8)}, 6–3 to win the singles tennis title at the 2011 ATP World Tour Finals. It was a then-record sixth Tour Finals title and his 70th career title.

Mardy Fish and Janko Tipsarević (as an alternate who replaced Andy Murray) made their debuts at the event.

== Seeds ==
1. (Serbia) Novak Djokovic (round robin)
2. (Spain) Rafael Nadal (round robin)
3. (United Kingdom) Andy Murray (round robin, withdrew because of a groin injury)
4. (Switzerland) Roger Federer (champion)
5. (Spain) David Ferrer (semifinals)
6. (France) Jo-Wilfried Tsonga (final)
7. (Czech Republic) Tomáš Berdych (semifinals)
8. (United States) Mardy Fish (round robin)

== Alternates ==
1. (Serbia) Janko Tipsarević (replaced Murray, round robin)
2. (Spain) Nicolás Almagro (Did not play)

== Draw ==
=== Key ===
- Q = Qualifier
- WC = Wild card
- LL = Lucky loser
- Alt = Alternate
- SE = Special exempt
- PR = Protected ranking
- ITF = ITF entry
- JE = Junior exempt
- w/o = Walkover
- r = Retired
- d = Defaulted
- SR = Special ranking

=== Finals ===
Semifinals
7	(Czech Republic) Tomáš Berdych	3	5
6	(France) Jo-Wilfried Tsonga	6	7
4	(Switzerland) Roger Federer	7	6
5	(Spain) David Ferrer	5	3

Final
6	(France) Jo-Wilfried Tsonga	3	7^{8}	3
4	(Switzerland) Roger Federer	6	6^{6}	6

=== Group A ===
		(Serbia) Djokovic	(United Kingdom) Murray (Serbia) Tipsarević	(Spain) Ferrer	(Czech Republic) Berdych	RR W–L	Set W–L	Game W–L	Standings
1	(Serbia) Novak Djokovic		6–3, 3–6, 3–6 (w/ Tipsarević)	3–6, 1–6	3–6, 6–3, 7–6^{(7–3)}	1–2	3–5 (37.5%)	32–42 (43.2%)	3
3; 9	(United Kingdom) Andy Murray (Serbia) Janko Tipsarević	3–6, 6–3, 6–3 (w/ Tipsarević)		4–6, 5–7 (w/ Murray)	6–2, 3–6, 6–7^{(6–8)} (w/ Tipsarević)	0–1; 1–1	0–2 (0.0%); 3–3 (50.0%)	9–13 (40.9%); 30–27 (52.6%)	X 4
5	(Spain) David Ferrer	6–3, 6–1	6–4, 7–5 (w/ Murray)		6–3, 5–7, 1–6	2–1	5–2 (71.4%)	37–29 (56.1%)	2
7	(Czech Republic) Tomáš Berdych	6–3, 3–6, 6–7^{(3–7)}	2–6, 6–3, 7–6^{(8–6)} (w/ Tipsarević)	3–6, 7–5, 6–1		2–1	5–4 (55.6%)	46–43 (51.7%)	1

Standings are determined by: 1. number of wins; 2. number of matches; 3. in two-players-ties, head-to-head records; 4. in three-players-ties, percentage of sets won, or of games won; 5. steering-committee decision.

=== Group B ===
		(Spain) Nadal	(Switzerland) Federer	(France) Tsonga	(United States) Fish	RR W–L	Set W–L	Game W–L	Standings
2	(Spain) Rafael Nadal		3–6, 0–6	6–7^{(2–7)}, 6–4, 3–6	6–2, 3–6, 7–6^{(7–3)}	1–2	3–5 (37.5%)	34–43 (44.2%)	3
4	(Switzerland) Roger Federer	6–3, 6–0		6–2, 2–6, 6–4	6–1, 3–6, 6–3	3–0	6–2 (75.0%)	41–25 (62.1%)	1
6	(France) Jo-Wilfried Tsonga	7–6^{(7–2)}, 4–6, 6–3	2–6, 6–2, 4–6		7–6^{(7–4)}, 6–1	2–1	5–3 (62.5%)	42–36 (53.8%)	2
8	(United States) Mardy Fish	2–6, 6–3, 6–7^{(3–7)}	1–6, 6–3, 3–6	6–7^{(4–7)}, 1–6		0–3	2–6 (25.0%)	31–44 (41.3%)	4

Standings are determined by: 1. number of wins; 2. number of matches; 3. in two-players-ties, head-to-head records; 4. in three-players-ties, percentage of sets won, or of games won; 5. steering-committee decision.
