= 2011 Erste Bank Open – Singles =

Singles
- 2011 Erste Bank Open

Final
- Champion: (France) Jo-Wilfried Tsonga
- Runner-up: (Argentina) Juan Martín del Potro
- Score: 6–7^{(5–7)}, 6–3, 6–4

Details
- Draw: 28
- Seeds: 8

Events
Singles	Doubles
- Vienna Open

Jo-Wilfried Tsonga defeated Juan Martín del Potro in the final, 6–7^{(5–7)}, 6–3, 6–4 to win the singles tennis title at the 2011 Vienna Open.

Jürgen Melzer was the two-time defending champion, but lost to Kevin Anderson in the quarterfinals.

This tournament marked the final professional appearance of former world No. 1 and 1995 French Open champion Thomas Muster; he lost in the first round to Dominic Thiem.

== Seeds ==
The top four seeds receive a bye into the second round.

1. (France) Jo-Wilfried Tsonga (champion)
2. (Argentina) Juan Martín del Potro (final)
3. (Austria) Jürgen Melzer (quarterfinals)
4. (Czech Republic) Radek Štěpánek (second round)
5. (Argentina) Juan Ignacio Chela (first round)
6. (South Africa) Kevin Anderson (semifinals)
7. (Russia) Nikolay Davydenko (first round)
8. (Italy) Fabio Fognini (second round)

== Draw ==
Key

- Q = Qualifier
- WC = Wild card
- LL = Lucky loser
- Alt = Alternate
- ITF = ITF entry
- PR = Protected ranking
- SR = Special ranking
- SE = Special exempt
- JE = Junior exempt
- JR = Junior Accelerator Programme entrant
- CO = College Accelerator Programme entrant
- NG = Next Gen Accelerator Program entrant
- w/o = Walkover
- r = Retired
- d = Defaulted

=== Finals ===
Semifinals
1	(France) Jo-Wilfried Tsonga	6	7^{7}
Q	(Germany) Daniel Brands	2	6^{4}
6	(South Africa) Kevin Anderson	4	6	4
2	(Argentina) Juan Martín del Potro	6	3	6

Final
1	(France) Jo-Wilfried Tsonga	6^{5}	6	6
2	(Argentina) Juan Martín del Potro	7^{7}	3	4

=== Top half ===
First round
(Netherlands) R Haase	6^{3}	4
(Finland) J Nieminen	7^{7}	6
(Spain) A Ramos	1	4
(Belgium) X Malisse	6	6
(Spain) T Robredo	6^{7}	7	1^{r}
8	(Italy) F Fognini	7^{9}	5	2
WC	(Austria) M Fischer	7^{7}	2	6^{6}
Q	(Germany) D Brands	6^{3}	6	7^{8}
WC	(Austria) T Muster	2	3
WC	(Austria) D Thiem	6	6
Q	(Belgium) S Darcis	3	6	7^{7}
7	(Russia) N Davydenko	6	0	6^{2}

Second round
1	(France) J-W Tsonga	3	6	3
(Finland) J Nieminen	6	1	1^{r}
(Belgium) X Malisse	6^{3}	6	6
8	(Italy) F Fognini	7^{7}	3	3
4	(Czech Republic) R Štěpánek	4	6^{4}
Q	(Germany) D Brands	6	7^{7}
WC	(Austria) D Thiem	2	2
Q	(Belgium) S Darcis	6	6

Quarterfinals
1	(France) J-W Tsonga	4	7^{7}	6
(Belgium) X Malisse	6	6^{4}	4
Q	(Germany) D Brands	6	6
Q	(Belgium) S Darcis	3	4

Semifinals
1	(France) J-W Tsonga	6	7^{7}
Q	(Germany) D Brands	2	6^{4}

=== Bottom half ===
First round
6	(South Africa) K Anderson	6	6
(Austria) A Haider-Maurer	4	4
(United States) R Sweeting	4	2
(Cyprus) M Baghdatis	6	6
(Spain) G García López	6	5	6
(United States) J Blake	2	7	4
5	(Argentina) JI Chela	7^{7}	3	6^{5}
Q	(Germany) T Haas	6^{3}	6	7^{7}
Q	(Slovenia) A Bedene	7^{7}
(Croatia) I Karlović	6^{4}	r
(Spain) P Andújar	2	2
(Germany) P Petzschner	6	6

Second round
6	(South Africa) K Anderson	6	7^{7}
(Cyprus) M Baghdatis	2	6^{5}
(Spain) G García López	5	1
3	(Austria) J Melzer	7	6
Q	(Germany) T Haas	4	6	6
Q	(Slovenia) A Bedene	6	4	1
(Germany) P Petzschner	3	4
2	(Argentina) JM del Potro	6	6

Quarterfinals
6	(South Africa) K Anderson	6	6
3	(Austria) J Melzer	3	3
Q	(Germany) T Haas	2	4
2	(Argentina) JM del Potro	6	6

Semifinal
6	(South Africa) K Anderson	4	6	4
2	(Argentina) JM del Potro	6	3	6
