= 2011 Erste Bank Open – Doubles =

Doubles
- 2011 Erste Bank Open

Final
- Champions: (United States) Bob Bryan (United States) Mike Bryan
- Runners-up: (Belarus) Max Mirnyi (Canada) Daniel Nestor
- Score: 7–6^{(12–10)}, 6–3

Details
- Draw: 16
- Seeds: 4

Events
Singles	Doubles
- Vienna Open

Daniel Nestor and Nenad Zimonjić were the defending champions but Zimonjić decided not to participate.
Nestor plays alongside Max Mirnyi.

World No.1s Bob Bryan and Mike Bryan defeated Max Mirnyi and Daniel Nestor in the final, 7–6^{(12–10)}, 6–3.

== Seeds ==
1. (United States) Bob Bryan / (United States) Mike Bryan (champions)
2. (Belarus) Max Mirnyi / (Canada) Daniel Nestor (finals)
3. (Austria) Jürgen Melzer / (Germany) Philipp Petzschner (first round)
4. (Poland) Mariusz Fyrstenberg / (Poland) Marcin Matkowski (semifinals)

== Draw ==
Key

- Q = Qualifier
- WC = Wild card
- LL = Lucky loser
- Alt = Alternate
- ITF = ITF entry
- PR = Protected ranking
- SR = Special ranking
- SE = Special exempt
- JE = Junior exempt
- JR = Junior Accelerator Programme entrant
- CO = College Accelerator Programme entrant
- NG = Next Gen Accelerator Program entrant
- w/o = Walkover
- r = Retired
- d = Defaulted

=== Draw ===
First round
1	(United States) B Bryan (United States) M Bryan	6^{9}	7^{7}	[11]
(Germany) C Kas (Austria) A Peya	7^{11}	6^{4}	[9]
(Austria) O Marach (Spain) D Marrero	7^{9}	6
(United States) S Lipsky (United States) R Ram	6^{7}	1
4	(Poland) M Fyrstenberg (Poland) M Matkowski	6^{5}	6	[10]
(Argentina) JI Chela (Brazil) A Sá	7^{7}	2	[6]
(Brazil) M Melo (Brazil) B Soares	6	6^{1}	[4]
(India) R Bopanna (Pakistan) A-u-H Qureshi	2	7^{7}	[10]
Alt	(Spain) P Andújar (Spain) G García-López	1	6^{6}
WC	(Austria) A Haider-Maurer (Austria) P Oswald	6	7^{8}
(Argentina) JM del Potro (Czech Republic) R Štěpánek	6	6
3	(Austria) J Melzer (Germany) P Petzschner	4	2
(Italy) S Bolelli (Italy) F Fognini	6	6
WC	(Austria) G Melzer (Austria) D Thiem	0	3
(United States) E Butorac (Curaçao) J-J Rojer	3	3
2	(Belarus) M Mirnyi (Canada) D Nestor	6	6

Quarterfinals
1	(United States) B Bryan (United States) M Bryan	6	7^{7}
(Austria) O Marach (Spain) D Marrero	3	6^{2}
4	(Poland) M Fyrstenberg (Poland) M Matkowski	6	3	[10]
(India) R Bopanna (Pakistan) A-u-H Qureshi	4	6	[4]
WC	(Austria) A Haider-Maurer (Austria) P Oswald	4	4
(Argentina) JM del Potro (Czech Republic) R Štěpánek	6	6
(Italy) S Bolelli (Italy) F Fognini	7^{7}	2	[6]
2	(Belarus) M Mirnyi (Canada) D Nestor	6^{3}	6	[10]

Semifinals
1	(United States) B Bryan (United States) M Bryan	6	6
4	(Poland) M Fyrstenberg (Poland) M Matkowski	3	2
(Argentina) JM del Potro (Czech Republic) R Štěpánek	3	6^{2}
2	(Belarus) M Mirnyi (Canada) D Nestor	6	7^{7}

Final
1	(United States) B Bryan (United States) M Bryan	7^{12}	6
2	(Belarus) M Mirnyi (Canada) D Nestor	6^{10}	3
