= 2011 ATP World Tour Finals – Doubles =

Doubles
- 2011 ATP World Tour Finals

Final
- Champions: (Canada) Daniel Nestor (Belarus) Max Mirnyi
- Runners-up: (Poland) Mariusz Fyrstenberg (Poland) Marcin Matkowski
- Score: 7–5, 6–3

Events
Singles	Doubles
← 2010 ·	ATP World Tour Finals	· 2012 →

Defending champion Daniel Nestor and his partner Max Mirnyi defeated Mariusz Fyrstenberg and Marcin Matkowski in the final, 7–5, 6–3 to win the doubles tennis title at the 2011 ATP World Tour Finals.

Nestor and Nenad Zimonjić were the reigning champions, but they split in 2011. Zimonjić partnered Michaël Llodra, but they were eliminated in the round-robin stage.

== Seeds ==
1. (United States) Bob Bryan / (United States) Mike Bryan (semifinals)
2. (France) Michaël Llodra / (Serbia) Nenad Zimonjić (round robin)
3. (Belarus) Max Mirnyi / (Canada) Daniel Nestor (champions)
4. (India) Mahesh Bhupathi / (India) Leander Paes (semifinals)
5. (India) Rohan Bopanna / (Pakistan) Aisam-ul-Haq Qureshi (round robin)
6. (Sweden) Robert Lindstedt / (Romania) Horia Tecău (round robin)
7. (Austria) Jürgen Melzer / (Germany) Philipp Petzschner (round robin)
8. (Poland) Mariusz Fyrstenberg / (Poland) Marcin Matkowski (final)

== Draw ==
=== Key ===
- Q = Qualifier
- WC = Wild card
- LL = Lucky loser
- Alt = Alternate
- SE = Special exempt
- PR = Protected ranking
- ITF = ITF entry
- JE = Junior exempt
- w/o = Walkover
- r = Retired
- d = Defaulted
- SR = Special ranking

=== Finals ===
Semifinals
4	(India) Mahesh Bhupathi (India) Leander Paes	4	6	[6]
8	(Poland) Mariusz Fyrstenberg (Poland) Marcin Matkowski	6	4	[10]
3	(Belarus) Max Mirnyi (Canada) Daniel Nestor	7^{8}	6
1	(United States) Bob Bryan (United States) Mike Bryan	6^{6}	4

Final
8	(Poland) Mariusz Fyrstenberg (Poland) Marcin Matkowski	5	3
3	(Belarus) Max Mirnyi (Canada) Daniel Nestor	7	6

=== Group A ===
		(United States) Bryan (United States) Bryan	(India) Bhupathi (India) Paes	(Sweden) Lindstedt (Romania) Tecău	(Austria) Melzer (Germany) Petzschner	RR W–L	Set W–L	Game W–L	Standings
1	(United States) Bob Bryan (United States) Mike Bryan		4–6, 2–6	6–1, 6–2	6–7^{(4–7)}, 7–5, [10–7]	2–1	4–3 (57.1%)	32–27 (54.2%)	2
4	(India) Mahesh Bhupathi (India) Leander Paes	6–4, 6–2		6–7^{(6–8)}, 1–6	7–5, 6–3	2–1	4–2 (66.7%)	32–27 (54.2%)	1
6	(Sweden) Robert Lindstedt (Romania) Horia Tecău	1–6, 2–6	7–6^{(8–6)}, 6–1		3–6, 4–6	1–2	2–4 (33.3%)	23–31 (42.6%)	4
7	(Austria) Jürgen Melzer (Germany) Philipp Petzschner	7–6^{(7–4)}, 5–7, [7–10]	5–7, 3–6	6–3, 6–4		1–2	3–4 (42.9%)	32–34 (48.5%)	3

Standings are determined by: 1. number of wins; 2. number of matches; 3. in two-players-ties, head-to-head records; 4. in three-players-ties, percentage of sets won, or of games won; 5. steering-committee decision.

=== Group B ===
		(France) Llodra (Serbia) Zimonjić	(Belarus) Mirnyi (Canada) Nestor	(India) Bopanna (Pakistan) Qureshi	(Poland) Fyrstenberg (Poland) Matkowski	RR W–L	Set W–L	Game W–L	Standings
2	(France) Michaël Llodra (Serbia) Nenad Zimonjić		6–4, 3–6, [7–10]	7–6^{(8–6)}, 6–3	4–6, 7–5, [9–11]	1–2	4–4 (50.0%)	33–32 (50.8%)	3
3	(Belarus) Max Mirnyi (Canada) Daniel Nestor	4–6, 6–3, [10–7]		7–6^{(7–2)}, 4–6, [11–9]	6–4, 6–3	3–0	6–2 (75.0%)	35–28 (55.5%)	1
5	(India) Rohan Bopanna (Pakistan) Aisam-ul-Haq Qureshi	6–7^{(6–8)}, 3–6	6–7^{(2–7)}, 6–4, [9–11]		2–6, 1–6	0–3	1–6 (14.3%)	24–37 (39.3%)	4
8	(Poland) Mariusz Fyrstenberg (Poland) Marcin Matkowski	6–4, 5–7, [11–9]	4–6, 3–6	6–2, 6–1		2–1	4–3 (57.1%)	31–26 (54.4%)	2

Standings are determined by: 1. number of wins; 2. number of matches; 3. in two-players-ties, head-to-head records; 4. in three-players-ties, percentage of sets won, or of games won; 5. steering-committee decision.
