= 2011 Monte-Carlo Rolex Masters – Singles =

Singles
- 2011 Monte-Carlo Rolex Masters

Final
- Champion: (Spain) Rafael Nadal
- Runner-up: (Spain) David Ferrer
- Score: 6–4, 7–5

Details
- Draw: 56 (7 Q / 2 WC )
- Seeds: 16

Events
Singles	Doubles
- Monte-Carlo Rolex Masters

Six-time defending champion Rafael Nadal defeated David Ferrer in the final, 6–4, 7–5 to win the singles tennis title at the 2011 Monte-Carlo Masters. It was his seventh consecutive Monte-Carlo Masters title, extending his tournament win streak to 37 consecutive matches.

== Seeds ==
The top eight seeds receive a bye into the second round.

1. (Spain) Rafael Nadal (champion)
2. (Switzerland) Roger Federer (quarterfinals)
3. (United Kingdom) Andy Murray (semifinals)
4. (Spain) David Ferrer (final)
5. (Czech Republic) Tomáš Berdych (third round)
6. (Spain) Fernando Verdasco (second round)
7. (Austria) Jürgen Melzer (semifinals)
8. (France) Gaël Monfils (third round)
9. (Spain) Nicolás Almagro (third round)
10. (Russia) Mikhail Youzhny (first round)
11. (Serbia) Viktor Troicki (quarterfinals)
12. (France) Jo-Wilfried Tsonga (second round)
13. (France) Richard Gasquet (third round)
14. (Ukraine) Alexandr Dolgopolov (first round)
15. (Croatia) Marin Čilić (third round)
16. (France) Gilles Simon (third round)

== Draw ==
Key

- Q = Qualifier
- WC = Wild card
- LL = Lucky loser
- Alt = Alternate
- ITF = ITF entry
- PR = Protected ranking
- SR = Special ranking
- SE = Special exempt
- JE = Junior exempt
- JR = Junior Accelerator Programme entrant
- CO = College Accelerator Programme entrant
- NG = Next Gen Accelerator Program entrant
- w/o = Walkover
- r = Retired
- d = Defaulted

=== Finals ===
Quarterfinals
1	(Spain) Rafael Nadal	6	6
(Croatia) Ivan Ljubičić	1	3
3/WC	(United Kingdom) Andy Murray	6	6
Q	(Portugal) Fred Gil	2	1
11	(Serbia) Viktor Troicki	3	3
4	(Spain) David Ferrer	6	6
7	(Austria) Jürgen Melzer	6	6
2	(Switzerland) Roger Federer	4	4

Semifinals
1	(Spain) Rafael Nadal	6	2	6
3/WC	(United Kingdom) Andy Murray	4	6	1
4	(Spain) David Ferrer	6	6
7	(Austria) Jürgen Melzer	3	2

Final
1	(Spain) Rafael Nadal	6	7
4	(Spain) David Ferrer	4	5

=== Top half ===
==== Section 1 ====
First round
Q	(France) J Benneteau	6	3	6^{3}
(Finland) J Nieminen	4	6	7
Q	(France) V Millot	2	4
(Spain) G García López	6	6
(Uzbekistan) D Istomin	7	3	4
13	(France) R Gasquet	5	6	6
12	(France) J-W Tsonga	4	6	6
(Argentina) J Mónaco	6	3	2
(France) J Chardy	1	2
(Croatia) I Ljubičić	6	6
Q	(Belgium) O Rochus	6	5	7
(Argentina) JI Chela	4	7	5

Second round
1	(Spain) R Nadal	6	6
(Finland) J Nieminen	2	2
(Spain) G García López	2	1
13	(France) R Gasquet	6	6
12	(France) J-W Tsonga	6^{2}	4
(Croatia) I Ljubičić	7	6
Q	(Belgium) O Rochus	2	3
5/WC	(Czech Republic) T Berdych	6	6

Third round
1	(Spain) R Nadal	6	6
13	(France) R Gasquet	2	4
(Croatia) I Ljubičić	6	6
5/WC	(Czech Republic) T Berdych	4	2

Quarterfinals
1	(Spain) R Nadal	6	6
(Croatia) I Ljubičić	1	3

==== Section 2 ====
First round
WC	(Czech Republic) R Štěpánek	3	6	7
(Cyprus) M Baghdatis	6	1	6^{7}
(Spain) A Montañés	6	6
(Belgium) X Malisse	4	2
(Brazil) T Bellucci	3	2
16	(France) G Simon	6	6
10	(Russia) M Youzhny	3	6	3
(Germany) F Mayer	6	2	6
Q	(Portugal) F Gil	6	6
(Ukraine) S Stakhovsky	1	3
(Spain) D Gimeno Traver	7	7
(Colombia) S Giraldo	6^{4}	5

Second round
3/WC	(United Kingdom) A Murray	6	6
WC	(Czech Republic) R Štěpánek	1	4
(Spain) A Montañés	3	4
16	(France) G Simon	6	6
(Germany) F Mayer	5	1
Q	(Portugal) F Gil	7	6
(Spain) D Gimeno Traver	5	2
8	(France) G Monfils	7	6

Third round
3/WC	(United Kingdom) A Murray	6	6
16	(France) G Simon	3	3
Q	(Portugal) F Gil	7	6
8	(France) G Monfils	6^{6}	2

Quarterfinals
3/WC	(United Kingdom) A Murray	6	6
Q	(Portugal) F Gil	2	1

=== Bottom half ===
==== Section 3 ====
First round
(Spain) T Robredo	6	6
(Croatia) I Dodig	4	2
(South Africa) K Anderson	6	2	2
(Italy) F Fognini	3	6	6
WC	(Monaco) J-R Lisnard	6^{4}	1
11	(Serbia) V Troicki	7	6
14	(Ukraine) A Dolgopolov	1	4
(Latvia) E Gulbis	6	6
(France) M Llodra	3	6	0
(Canada) M Raonic	6	0	6
(Serbia) J Tipsarević	6	3	6^{4}
(Spain) F López	4	6	7

Second round
6	(Spain) F Verdasco	4	3
(Spain) T Robredo	6	6
(Italy) F Fognini	3	6	4
11	(Serbia) V Troicki	6	4	6
(Latvia) E Gulbis	4	5
(Canada) M Raonic	6	7
(Spain) F López	2	0
4	(Spain) D Ferrer	6	6

Third round
(Spain) T Robredo	6	1	r
11	(Serbia) V Troicki	3	2
(Canada) M Raonic	1	3
4	(Spain) D Ferrer	6	6

Quarterfinals
11	(Serbia) V Troicki	3	3
4	(Spain) D Ferrer	6	6

==== Section 4 ====
First round
(Russia) N Davydenko	5	6	4
(Netherlands) R Haase	7	4	6
Q	(Argentina) M González	3	7	6
(Romania) V Hănescu	6	5	1
(Spain) M Granollers	3	3
9	(Spain) N Almagro	6	6
15	(Croatia) M Čilić	6	6
Q	(Italy) F Volandri	2	1
Q	(Spain) P Riba	4	6	6
(Italy) P Starace	6	3	3
(Kazakhstan) A Golubev	7	6^{6}	4
(Germany) P Kohlschreiber	5	7	6

Second round
7	(Austria) J Melzer	3	6	6
(Netherlands) R Haase	6	1	2
Q	(Argentina) M González	7	5	6^{10}
9	(Spain) N Almagro	6^{6}	7	7
15	(Croatia) M Čilić	5
Q	(Spain) P Riba	2	r
(Germany) P Kohlschreiber	2	1
2	(Switzerland) R Federer	6	6

Third round
7	(Austria) J Melzer	6	6
9	(Spain) N Almagro	1	4
15	(Croatia) M Čilić	4	3
2	(Switzerland) R Federer	6	6

Quarterfinals
7	(Austria) J Melzer	6	6
2	(Switzerland) R Federer	4	4
