= 2011 BNP Paribas Masters – Doubles =

Doubles
- 2011 BNP Paribas Masters

Final
- Champions: (India) Rohan Bopanna (Pakistan) Aisam-ul-Haq Qureshi
- Runners-up: (France) Julien Benneteau (France) Nicolas Mahut
- Score: 6–2, 6–4

Details
- Draw: 24
- Seeds: 8

Events
Singles	Doubles
← 2010 ·	BNP Paribas Masters	· 2012 →

Mahesh Bhupathi and Max Mirnyi were the defending champions, but decided not to participate together.

Bhupathi played alongside Leander Paes but were eliminated in the second round, while Mirnyi partnered up with Daniel Nestor but were eliminated in the semifinals.

In the final, Rohan Bopanna and Aisam-ul-Haq Qureshi won the title beating French wildcards Julien Benneteau and Nicolas Mahut 6–2, 6–4.

== Seeds ==
1. (United States) Bob Bryan / (United States) Mike Bryan (second round)
2. (France) Michaël Llodra / (Serbia) Nenad Zimonjić (quarterfinals)
3. (Belarus) Max Mirnyi / (Canada) Daniel Nestor (semifinals)
4. (India) Mahesh Bhupathi / (India) Leander Paes (second round)
5. (Sweden) Robert Lindstedt / (Romania) Horia Tecău (second round)
6. (Poland) Mariusz Fyrstenberg / (Poland) Marcin Matkowski (quarterfinals)
7. (India) Rohan Bopanna / (Pakistan) Aisam-ul-Haq Qureshi (champions)
8. (Austria) Oliver Marach / (Austria) Alexander Peya (quarterfinals)

== Draw ==
=== Key ===
- Q = Qualifier
- WC = Wild card
- LL = Lucky loser
- Alt = Alternate
- SE = Special exempt
- PR = Protected ranking
- ITF = ITF entry
- JE = Junior exempt
- w/o = Walkover
- r = Retired
- d = Defaulted
- SR = Special ranking

=== Finals ===
Semifinals
WC	(France) Julien Benneteau (France) Nicolas Mahut	6	7^{7}
(Mexico) Santiago González (Germany) Christopher Kas	1	6^{3}
3	(Belarus) Max Mirnyi (Canada) Daniel Nestor	3	6^{7}
7	(India) Rohan Bopanna (Pakistan) Aisam-ul-Haq Qureshi	6	7^{9}

Final
WC	(France) Julien Benneteau (France) Nicolas Mahut	2	4
7	(India) Rohan Bopanna (Pakistan) Aisam-ul-Haq Qureshi	6	6

=== Top half ===
First round
WC	(France) J Benneteau (France) N Mahut	6	6
(The Bahamas) M Knowles (Belgium) X Malisse	3	3
WC	(France) A Clément (France) É Roger-Vasselin	7^{8}	6
Alt	(Belgium) D Norman (Ukraine) S Stakhovsky	6^{6}	4
(Mexico) S González (Germany) C Kas	3	7^{7}	[10]
(Italy) D Bracciali (Israel) A Ram	6	6^{5}	[4]
(Brazil) M Melo (Brazil) B Soares	6	6
(Poland) Ł Kubot (Germany) F Mayer	4	3

Second round
1	(United States) B Bryan (United States) M Bryan	6^{6}	6	[8]
WC	(France) J Benneteau (France) N Mahut	7^{8}	3	[10]
WC	(France) A Clément (France) É Roger-Vasselin	3	3
6	(Poland) M Fyrstenberg (Poland) M Matkowski	6	6
4	(India) M Bhupathi (India) L Paes	6	1	[8]
(Mexico) S González (Germany) C Kas	3	6	[10]
(Brazil) M Melo (Brazil) B Soares	4	6	[10]
5	(Sweden) R Lindstedt (Romania) H Tecău	6	3	[6]

Quarterfinals
WC	(France) J Benneteau (France) N Mahut	6	3	[10]
6	(Poland) M Fyrstenberg (Poland) M Matkowski	2	6	[7]
(Mexico) S González (Germany) C Kas	7^{8}	6
(Brazil) M Melo (Brazil) B Soares	6^{6}	3

Semifinals
WC	(France) J Benneteau (France) N Mahut	6	7^{7}
(Mexico) S González (Germany) C Kas	1	6^{3}

=== Bottom half ===
First round
(United Kingdom) R Hutchins (United Kingdom) A Murray	4	6	[10]
(Spain) N Almagro (Spain) D Marrero	6	3	[7]
(Czech Republic) F Čermák (Slovakia) F Polášek	6	6
Alt	(Brazil) T Bellucci (Italy) A Seppi	2	3
(United Kingdom) C Fleming (United Kingdom) J Murray	6	2	[10]
(Spain) F López (Spain) F Verdasco	1	6	[8]
(United States) E Butorac (Curaçao) J-J Rojer	7^{7}	6^{8}	[10]
(South Africa) K Anderson (United States) J Isner	6^{4}	7^{10}	[7]

Second round
8	(Austria) O Marach (Austria) A Peya	6	6
(United Kingdom) R Hutchins (United Kingdom) A Murray	1	3
(Czech Republic) F Čermák (Slovakia) F Polášek	1	6^{15}
3	(Belarus) M Mirnyi (Canada) D Nestor	6	7^{17}
7	(India) R Bopanna (Pakistan) A-u-H Qureshi	6	6
(United Kingdom) C Fleming (United Kingdom) J Murray	4	3
(United States) E Butorac (Curaçao) J-J Rojer	3	6	[12]
2	(France) M Llodra (Serbia) N Zimonjić	6	4	[14]

Quarterfinals
8	(Austria) O Marach (Austria) A Peya	2	6^{7}
3	(Belarus) M Mirnyi (Canada) D Nestor	6	7^{9}
7	(India) R Bopanna (Pakistan) A-u-H Qureshi	3	6	[10]
2	(France) M Llodra (Serbia) N Zimonjić	6	4	[6]

Semifinals
3	(Belarus) M Mirnyi (Canada) D Nestor	3	6^{7}
7	(India) R Bopanna (Pakistan) A-u-H Qureshi	6	7^{9}
