= 2011 BNP Paribas Masters – Singles =

Singles
- 2011 BNP Paribas Masters

Final
- Champion: (Switzerland) Roger Federer
- Runner-up: (France) Jo-Wilfried Tsonga
- Score: 6–1, 7–6^{(7–3)}

Details
- Draw: 48 (6 Q / 3 WC)
- Seeds: 16

Events
Singles	Doubles
- BNP Paribas Masters

Roger Federer defeated Jo-Wilfried Tsonga in the final, 6–1, 7–6^{(7–3)} to win the singles tennis title at the 2011 Paris Masters. He did not lose a single set during the tournament.

Robin Söderling was the reigning champion, but did not participate due to mononucleosis.

== Seeds ==
All seeds received a bye into the second round.

1. (Serbia) Novak Djokovic (quarterfinals, withdrew due to a right shoulder injury)
2. (United Kingdom) Andy Murray (quarterfinals)
3. (Switzerland) Roger Federer (champion)
4. (Spain) David Ferrer (quarterfinals)
5. (Czech Republic) Tomáš Berdych (semifinals)
6. (France) Jo-Wilfried Tsonga (final)
7. (United States) Mardy Fish (third round, retired due to a groin injury)
8. (France) Gaël Monfils (second round)
9. (Spain) Nicolás Almagro (second round)
10. (France) Gilles Simon (second round)
11. (Serbia) Janko Tipsarević (third round)
12. (Argentina) ~~Juan Martín del Potro~~ (withdrew due to a right shoulder injury)
13. (United States) Andy Roddick (third round)
14. (Ukraine) Alexandr Dolgopolov (third round)
15. (Serbia) Viktor Troicki (third round)
16. (France) Richard Gasquet (third round)

== Draw ==
Key

- Q = Qualifier
- WC = Wild card
- LL = Lucky loser
- Alt = Alternate
- ITF = ITF entry
- PR = Protected ranking
- SR = Special ranking
- SE = Special exempt
- JE = Junior exempt
- JR = Junior Accelerator Programme entrant
- CO = College Accelerator Programme entrant
- NG = Next Gen Accelerator Program entrant
- w/o = Walkover
- r = Retired
- d = Defaulted

=== Finals ===
Quarterfinals
1	(Serbia) Novak Djokovic
6	(France) Jo-Wilfried Tsonga	^{w/o}
4	(Spain) David Ferrer	3	6	3
(United States) John Isner	6	3	6
(Argentina) Juan Mónaco	3	5
3	(Switzerland) Roger Federer	6	7
5	(Czech Republic) Tomáš Berdych	4	7^{7}	6
2	(United Kingdom) Andy Murray	6	6^{5}	4

Semifinals
6	(France) Jo-Wilfried Tsonga	3	7^{7}	7^{7}
(United States) John Isner	6	6^{1}	6^{3}
3	(Switzerland) Roger Federer	6	6
5	(Czech Republic) Tomáš Berdych	4	3

Final
6	(France) Jo-Wilfried Tsonga	1	6^{3}
3	(Switzerland) Roger Federer	6	7^{7}

=== Top half ===
==== Section 1 ====
First round
(Italy) F Fognini	6	1	3
(Croatia) I Dodig	4	6	6
SE	(Japan) K Nishikori	4	4
Q	(Ukraine) S Stakhovsky	6	6
Q	(Italy) A Seppi	7^{7}	7
(Russia) N Davydenko	6^{2}	5
(Spain) G García López	6	1	6
Q	(Colombia) S Giraldo	4	6	4

Second round
1	(Serbia) N Djokovic	6	6
(Croatia) I Dodig	4	3
Q	(Ukraine) S Stakhovsky	4	4
15	(Serbia) V Troicki	6	6
9	(Spain) N Almagro	3	5
Q	(Italy) A Seppi	6	7
(Spain) G García López	3	4
6	(France) J-W Tsonga	6	6

Third round
1	(Serbia) N Djokovic	4	6	6
15	(Serbia) V Troicki	6	3	1
Q	(Italy) A Seppi	3	4
6	(France) J-W Tsonga	6	6

Quarterfinals
1	(Serbia) N Djokovic
6	(France) J-W Tsonga	^{w/o}

==== Section 2 ====
First round
(Spain) JC Ferrero	2	3
Q	(France) N Mahut	6	6
(Russia) M Youzhny	4	2
Q	(Germany) P Kohlschreiber	6	6
(Switzerland) S Wawrinka	7^{7}	5	6^{5}
(United States) J Isner	6^{3}	7	7^{7}
(France) M Llodra	6^{7}	3
(Spain) F López	7^{9}	6

Second round
4	(Spain) D Ferrer	6	6
Q	(France) N Mahut	4	4
Q	(Germany) P Kohlschreiber	3	6^{6}
14	(Ukraine) A Dolgopolov	6	7^{8}
LL	(Russia) I Kunitsyn	4	4
(United States) J Isner	6	6
(Spain) F López	6	6
8	(France) G Monfils	3	4

Third round
4	(Spain) D Ferrer	6	6
14	(Ukraine) A Dolgopolov	3	2
(United States) J Isner	6	6
(Spain) F López	4	2

Quarterfinals
4	(Spain) D Ferrer	3	6	3
(United States) J Isner	6	3	6

=== Bottom half ===
==== Section 3 ====
First round
(Germany) F Mayer	7	6
(Czech Republic) R Štěpánek	5	3
(Argentina) J Mónaco	6	6
Q	(United States) D Young	4	2
(Luxembourg) G Müller	3	6	4
(South Africa) K Anderson	6	4	6
(Russia) D Tursunov	2	2
WC	(France) A Mannarino	6	6

Second round
7	(United States) M Fish	6	6
(Germany) F Mayer	1	2
(Argentina) J Mónaco	6	6
10	(France) G Simon	4	0
16	(France) R Gasquet	6	7^{7}
(South Africa) K Anderson	4	6^{4}
WC	(France) A Mannarino	2	3
3	(Switzerland) R Federer	6	6

Third round
7	(United States) M Fish	6	6^{6}	2^{r}
(Argentina) J Mónaco	1	7^{8}	1
16	(France) R Gasquet	2	4
3	(Switzerland) R Federer	6	6

Quarterfinals
(Argentina) J Mónaco	3	5
3	(Switzerland) R Federer	6	7

==== Section 4 ====
First round
(Croatia) M Čilić	6	2	3
(Spain) F Verdasco	3	6	6
(Brazil) T Bellucci	6	6^{4}	2
(United States) A Bogomolov Jr.	4	7^{7}	6
(Canada) M Raonic	7^{7}	6^{5}	4
WC	(France) J Benneteau	6^{5}	7^{7}	6
WC	(France) J Chardy	6
(Spain) M Granollers	3^{r}

Second round
5	(Czech Republic) T Berdych	6	7
(Spain) F Verdasco	3	5
(United States) A Bogomolov Jr.	1	0
11	(Serbia) J Tipsarević	6	6
13	(United States) A Roddick	6	6
WC	(France) J Benneteau	4	4
WC	(France) J Chardy	2	4
2	(United Kingdom) A Murray	6	6

Third round
5	(Czech Republic) T Berdych	7	6
11	(Serbia) J Tipsarević	5	4
13	(United States) A Roddick	2	2
2	(United Kingdom) A Murray	6	6

Quarterfinals
5	(Czech Republic) T Berdych	4	7^{7}	6
2	(United Kingdom) A Murray	6	6^{5}	4
