= 2011 Monte-Carlo Rolex Masters – Doubles =

Doubles
- 2011 Monte-Carlo Rolex Masters

Final
- Champions: (United States) Bob Bryan (United States) Mike Bryan
- Runners-up: (Argentina) Juan Ignacio Chela (Brazil) Bruno Soares
- Score: 6–3, 6–2

Events
Singles	Doubles
← 2010 ·	Monte-Carlo Rolex Masters	· 2012 →

Daniel Nestor and Nenad Zimonjić were the defending champions, but decided not to participate together.
Zimonjić played alongside Michaël Llodra, but lost to Marcel Granollers and Tommy Robredo in the second round.
Nestor partnered up with Max Mirnyi, but they were eliminated by Rohan Bopanna and Aisam-ul-Haq Qureshi in the quarterfinals.
Bob Bryan and Mike Bryan won the title, defeating Juan Ignacio Chela and Bruno Soares 6–3, 6–2 in the finals.

== Seeds ==
All seeds received a bye into the second round.

1. (United States) Bob Bryan / (United States) Mike Bryan (champions)
2. (Belarus) Max Mirnyi / (Canada) Daniel Nestor (quarterfinals)
3. (Austria) Jürgen Melzer / (Germany) Philipp Petzschner (second round)
4. (Poland) Łukasz Kubot / (Austria) Oliver Marach (quarterfinals)
5. (Poland) Mariusz Fyrstenberg / (Poland) Marcin Matkowski (semifinals)
6. (India) Rohan Bopanna / (Pakistan) Aisam-ul-Haq Qureshi (semifinals)
7. (France) Michaël Llodra / (Serbia) Nenad Zimonjić (second round)
8. (Sweden) Robert Lindstedt / (Romania) Horia Tecău (second round)

== Draw ==
=== Key ===
- Q = Qualifier
- WC = Wild card
- LL = Lucky loser
- Alt = Alternate
- SE = Special exempt
- PR = Protected ranking
- ITF = ITF entry
- JE = Junior exempt
- w/o = Walkover
- r = Retired
- d = Defaulted
- SR = Special ranking

=== Finals ===
Semifinals
1	(United States) Bob Bryan (United States) Mike Bryan	6	6
5	(Poland) Mariusz Fyrstenberg (Poland) Marcin Matkowski	3	4
(Argentina) Juan Ignacio Chela (Brazil) Bruno Soares	6	6^{3}	[10]
6	(India) Rohan Bopanna (Pakistan) Aisam-ul-Haq Qureshi	2	7	[7]

Final
1	(United States) Bob Bryan (United States) Mike Bryan	6	6
(Argentina) Juan Ignacio Chela (Brazil) Bruno Soares	3	2

=== Top half ===
First round
(Latvia) E Gulbis (Serbia) V Troicki	6	6
(Australia) P Hanley (Israel) A Ram	0	1
(Spain) M Granollers (Spain) T Robredo	2	7^{7}	[11]
(Spain) F López (Spain) F Verdasco	6	6^{2}	[9]
(Spain) M López (Argentina) J Mónaco	3	7^{7}	[10]
WC	(France) J Benneteau (France) J Chardy	6	6^{1}	[12]
(Czech Republic) L Dlouhý (Serbia) J Tipsarević	4	5
(France) G Monfils (France) J-W Tsonga	6	7

Second round
1	(United States) B Bryan (United States) M Bryan	6	6
(Latvia) E Gulbis (Serbia) V Troicki	3	1
(Spain) M Granollers (Spain) T Robredo	6	6
7	(France) M Llodra (Serbia) N Zimonjić	2	1
4	(Poland) Ł Kubot (Austria) O Marach	7^{7}	4	[12]
WC	(France) J Benneteau (France) J Chardy	6^{5}	6	[10]
(France) G Monfils (France) J-W Tsonga	3	2
5	(Poland) M Fyrstenberg (Poland) M Matkowski	6	6

Quarterfinals
1	(United States) B Bryan (United States) M Bryan	w/o
(Spain) M Granollers (Spain) T Robredo
4	(Poland) Ł Kubot (Austria) O Marach	4	1
5	(Poland) M Fyrstenberg (Poland) M Matkowski	6	6

Semifinals
1	(United States) B Bryan (United States) M Bryan	6	6
5	(Poland) M Fyrstenberg (Poland) M Matkowski	3	4

=== Bottom half ===
First round
(Argentina) JI Chela (Brazil) B Soares	6	3	[10]
(Slovakia) M Mertiňák (Belgium) D Norman	2	6	[7]
WC	(Monaco) G Couillard (Monaco) J-R Lisnard	6^{1}	4
(Ukraine) S Stakhovsky (Russia) M Youzhny	7^{7}	6
(United States) E Butorac (Curaçao) J-J Rojer	4	6	[10]
(Spain) G García López (Spain) A Montañés	6	4	[8]
(France) R Gasquet (Croatia) I Ljubičić	6	6
(Spain) N Almagro (Canada) M Raonic	3	2

Second round
8	(Sweden) R Lindstedt (Romania) H Tecău	2	4
(Argentina) JI Chela (Brazil) B Soares	6	6
(Ukraine) S Stakhovsky (Russia) M Youzhny	6	7^{8}
3	(Austria) J Melzer (Germany) P Petzschner	1	6^{6}
6	(India) R Bopanna (Pakistan) A-u-H Qureshi	7	6
(United States) E Butorac (Curaçao) J-J Rojer	6^{4}	3
(France) R Gasquet (Croatia) I Ljubičić	2	5
2	(Belarus) M Mirnyi (Canada) D Nestor	6	7

Quarterfinals
(Argentina) JI Chela (Brazil) B Soares	6	6
(Ukraine) S Stakhovsky (Russia) M Youzhny	4	3
6	(India) R Bopanna (Pakistan) A-u-H Qureshi	6	7
2	(Belarus) M Mirnyi (Canada) D Nestor	1	5

Semifinals
(Argentina) JI Chela (Brazil) B Soares	6	6^{3}	[10]
6	(India) R Bopanna (Pakistan) A-u-H Qureshi	2	7	[7]
