= 2011 BNP Paribas Masters =

- Date: 7–13 November
- Edition: 39th
- Category: ATP World Tour Masters 1000
- Draw: 64S / 32D
- Prize money: €2,227,500
- Surface: Hard / indoor
- Location: Paris, France
- Venue: Palais omnisports de Paris-Bercy

Champions

Singles
- (Switzerland) Roger Federer

Doubles
- (India) Rohan Bopanna / (Pakistan) Aisam-ul-Haq Qureshi
← 2010 ·	Paris Masters	· 2012 →

The 2011 BNP Paribas Masters, also known as the Paris Masters, was an ATP World Tour professional men's tennis tournament played on indoor hard courts. It was the 39th edition of the tournament which was part of the 2011 ATP World Tour. It took place in Paris, France between 7 and 13 November 2011. Third-seeded Roger Federer won the singles title.

== Finals ==
=== Singles ===
(Switzerland) Roger Federer defeated (France) Jo-Wilfried Tsonga, 6–1, 7–6^{(7–3)}

- It was Federer's 3rd title of the year and 69th of his career. It was his 1st Masters of the year and 18th of his career. He became the only player to reach the final of all 9 Masters events.

=== Doubles ===
(India) Rohan Bopanna / (Pakistan) Aisam-ul-Haq Qureshi defeated (France) Julien Benneteau / (France) Nicolas Mahut, 6–2, 6–4

== Points and prize money ==
=== Points ===
Stage	Singles	Doubles
Champion	1000	
Runner up	600	
Semifinals	360	
Quarterfinals	180	
Round of 16	90	
Round of 32	45	0
Round of 64	10	-
Qualifier	25	-
Qualifying final round	14	-

=== Prize money ===
Stage	Singles	Doubles
Champion	€454,000	€134,500
Runner up	€0	€63,400
Semifinals	€106,500	€32,000
Quarterfinals	€55,500	€16,400
Round of 16	€29,155	€8,540
Round of 32	€15,320	€4,550
Round of 64	€8,040	–
Qualifying final round	€1,825	–
Qualifying first round	€925	–

== ATP entrants ==
=== Seeds ===
Country	Player	Rank^{1}	Seed
SRB	Novak Djokovic	1	1
GBR	Andy Murray	3	2
SUI	Roger Federer	4	3
ESP	David Ferrer	5	4
CZE	Tomáš Berdych	7	5
FRA	Jo-Wilfried Tsonga	8	6
USA	Mardy Fish	9	7
FRA	Gaël Monfils	10	8
ESP	Nicolás Almagro	11	9
FRA	Gilles Simon	12	10
SRB	Janko Tipsarević	13	11
ARG	~~Juan Martín del Potro~~	~~14~~	~~12~~
USA	Andy Roddick	15	13
UKR	Alexandr Dolgopolov	16	14
SRB	Viktor Troicki	17	15
FRA	Richard Gasquet	18	16

- ^{1} Rankings are as of 31 October 2011.

=== Other entrants ===
The following players received wildcards into the singles main draw:

- (France) Julien Benneteau
- (France) Jérémy Chardy
- (France) Adrian Mannarino

The following players received entry as a special exempt into the singles main draw:

- (Japan) Kei Nishikori

The following players received entry from the qualifying draw:

- (Colombia) Santiago Giraldo
- (Germany) Philipp Kohlschreiber
- (France) Nicolas Mahut
- (Italy) Andreas Seppi
- (Ukraine) Sergiy Stakhovsky
- (United States) Donald Young

The following players received entry from a lucky loser spot:

- (Russia) Igor Kunitsyn

=== Withdrawals ===
- (Spain) Rafael Nadal (training)
- (Sweden) Robin Söderling (mononucleosis)
- (Austria) Jürgen Melzer (back injury)
- (Croatia) Ivan Ljubičić
- (Argentina) Juan Ignacio Chela
- (Argentina) Juan Martín del Potro (shoulder injury)
