= 2011 Monte-Carlo Rolex Masters =

- Date: 9–17 April
- Edition: 105th
- Category: ATP World Tour Masters 1000
- Surface: Clay / outdoor
- Location: Roquebrune-Cap-Martin, France
- Venue: Monte Carlo Country Club

Champions

Singles
- (Spain) Rafael Nadal

Doubles
- (United States) Bob Bryan / (United States) Mike Bryan
- Monte-Carlo Masters

The 2011 Monte-Carlo Rolex Masters, a men's tennis tournament for male professional players, was played from 9 April through 17 April 2011, on outdoor clay courts and was part of the ATP World Tour Masters 1000 category of the 2011 ATP World Tour. It was the 105th edition of the annual Monte Carlo Masters tournament, which was sponsored by Rolex for the third time. It took place at the Monte Carlo Country Club in Roquebrune-Cap-Martin, France, near Monte Carlo, Monaco.

== Tournament ==
=== Exhibition ===
On 11 April, an exhibition featuring two players from the Women's Tennis Association, current world number one Caroline Wozniacki and reigning French Open champion Francesca Schiavone, took place during the traditional women's day at the tournament. Schiavone won the one-set exhibition match 6–4.

== Points and prize money ==
=== Points ===
Because the Monte Carlo Masters was the non-mandatory Masters 1000 event special rules around the point distribution happens. Monte Carlo Masters counted as one of a player's 500 level tournaments, while distributing Masters 1000 points.

Stage	Men's singles	Men's doubles
Champion	1000	
Runner up	600	
Semifinals	360	
Quarterfinals	180	
Round of 16	90	
Round of 32	45	0
Round of 64	10	-
Qualifier	25	-
Qualifying final round	16	-

=== Prize money ===
Stage	Men's singles	Men's doubles
Champion	€438,000	€134,500
Runner up	€205,000	€63,400
Semifinals	€104,400	€32,000
Quarterfinals	€53,500	€16,400
Round of 16	€27,750	€8,540
Round of 32	€14,635	€4,550
Round of 64	€7,715	–
Qualifying final round	€1,820	–
Qualifying first round	€900	–

== Entrants ==
=== Seeds ===
Country	Player	Rank^{1}	Seed
ESP	Rafael Nadal	1	1
SUI	Roger Federer	3	2
GBR	Andy Murray	4	3
ESP	David Ferrer	6	4
CZE	Tomáš Berdych	7	5
ESP	Fernando Verdasco	8	6
AUT	Jürgen Melzer	9	7
FRA	Gaël Monfils	10	8
ESP	Nicolás Almagro	12	9
RUS	Mikhail Youzhny	15	10
SER	Viktor Troicki	16	11
FRA	Jo-Wilfried Tsonga	17	12
FRA	Richard Gasquet	18	13
UKR	Alexandr Dolgopolov	21	14
CRO	Marin Čilić	22	15
FRA	Gilles Simon	23	16

- Rankings and seedings are as of 4 April 2011.

=== Other entrants ===
The following players received wildcards into the main draw:

- (Czech Republic) Tomáš Berdych
- (Monaco) Jean-René Lisnard
- (United Kingdom) Andy Murray
- (Czech Republic) Radek Štěpánek

The following players received entry via qualifying:

- (France) Julien Benneteau
- (Portugal) Frederico Gil
- (Argentina) Máximo González
- (France) Vincent Millot
- (Spain) Pere Riba
- (Belgium) Olivier Rochus
- (Italy) Filippo Volandri

=== Withdrawals ===
- (Serbia) Novak Djokovic (knee injury)

== Finals ==
=== Singles ===
(Spain) Rafael Nadal defeated (Spain) David Ferrer, 6–4, 7–5.

=== Doubles ===
(United States) Bob Bryan / (United States) Mike Bryan defeated (Argentina) Juan Ignacio Chela / (Brazil) Bruno Soares, 6–3, 6–2.
