= 2011 Shanghai Rolex Masters =

- Date: 10–16 October
- Edition: 3rd
- Category: ATP Masters 1000
- Draw: 64S / 32D
- Prize money: $3,240,000
- Location: Shanghai, China
- Venue: Qizhong Forest Sports City Arena

Champions

Singles
- (United Kingdom) Andy Murray

Doubles
- (Belarus) Max Mirnyi / (Canada) Daniel Nestor
| ← 2010 · | Shanghai Masters | · 2012 → |

The 2011 Shanghai Rolex Masters was a men's tennis tournament played on outdoor hard courts. It was the third edition of the Shanghai ATP Masters 1000, classified as an ATP World Tour Masters 1000 event on the 2011 ATP World Tour. It took place at Qizhong Forest Sports City Arena in Shanghai, China. This edition was held from 10 October through 16 October 2011. Second-seeded Andy Murray won the singles title.

== Points and prize money ==
=== Point distribution ===
| Event | W | F | SF | QF | Round of 16 | Round of 32 | Round of 64 | Q | Q2 | Q1 |
| Singles | 1000 | 600 | 360 | 180 | 90 | 45 | 10 | 25 | 14 | 0 |
| Doubles | 1000 | 600 | 360 | 180 | 90 | 0 | — | — | — | — |

=== Prize money ===
| Event | W | F | SF | QF | Round of 16 | Round of 32 | Round of 64 | Q2 | Q1 |
| Singles | $620,000 | $304,000 | $153,000 | $77,800 | $40,400 | $21,300 | $11,500 | $2,650 | $1,350 |
| Doubles | $192,000 | $94,000 | $47,150 | $24,200 | $12,510 | $6,600 | — | — | — |

== Entrants ==
=== Seeds ===
| Country | Player | Rank^{1} | Seed |
|---|---|---|---|
| ESP | Rafael Nadal | 2 | 1 |
| GBR | Andy Murray | 4 | 2 |
| ESP | David Ferrer | 5 | 3 |
| FRA | Jo-Wilfried Tsonga | 7 | 4 |
| USA | Mardy Fish | 8 | 5 |
| CZE | Tomáš Berdych | 10 | 6 |
| ESP | Nicolás Almagro | 11 | 7 |
| FRA | Gilles Simon | 12 | 8 |
| SRB | Janko Tipsarević | 13 | 9 |
| USA | Andy Roddick | 15 | 10 |
| SRB | Viktor Troicki | 16 | 11 |
| UKR | Alexandr Dolgopolov | 19 | 12 |
| SUI | Stanislas Wawrinka | 20 | 13 |
| AUT | Jürgen Melzer | 21 | 14 |
| GER | Florian Mayer | 22 | 15 |
| ESP | Fernando Verdasco | 23 | 16 |

- Rankings are as of October 3, 2011.

=== Other entrants ===
The following players received wildcards into the singles main draw:

- (China) Gong Maoxin
- (China) Li Zhe
- (Argentina) David Nalbandian
- (China) Zhang Ze

The following players received entry from the qualifying draw:

- (Switzerland) Stéphane Bohli
- (Australia) Matthew Ebden
- (United States) Ryan Harrison
- (Turkey) Marsel İlhan
- (Chinese Taipei) Lu Yen-hsun
- (Spain) Albert Ramos
- (United States) Donald Young

=== Withdrawals ===
- (Argentina) Juan Martín del Potro
- (Serbia) Novak Djokovic (ruptured back muscle)
- (Switzerland) Roger Federer (fatigue)
- (France) Richard Gasquet (elbow injury)
- (United States) John Isner (illness)
- (France) Gaël Monfils (knee injury)
- (Sweden) Robin Söderling (mono)

== Finals ==
=== Singles ===
(United Kingdom) Andy Murray defeated (Spain) David Ferrer, 7–5, 6–4

- It was Murray's 5th title of the year and 21st of his career. It was his 2nd Masters of the year and 8th of his career. He defended his title.

=== Doubles ===
(Belarus) Max Mirnyi / (Canada) Daniel Nestor defeated (France) Michaël Llodra / (Serbia) Nenad Zimonjić, 3–6, 6–1, [12–10]
