= 2011 Shanghai Rolex Masters – Doubles =

Doubles
- 2011 Shanghai Rolex Masters

Final
- Champions: (Belarus) Max Mirnyi (Canada) Daniel Nestor
- Runners-up: (France) Michaël Llodra (Serbia) Nenad Zimonjić
- Score: 3–6, 6–1, [12–10]

Events
Singles	Doubles
← 2010 ·	Shanghai Masters	· 2012 →

Jürgen Melzer and Leander Paes were the defending champions but decided not to participate together.
Melzer partnered up with Philipp Petzschner, while Paes played alongside Mahesh Bhupathi. However, neither couple were able to retain the title.
In the final, Max Mirnyi and Daniel Nestor won the title beating Michaël Llodra and Nenad Zimonjić 3–6, 6–1, [12–10].

== Seeds ==
1. (United States) Bob Bryan / (United States) Mike Bryan (quarterfinals)
2. (Belarus) Max Mirnyi / (Canada) Daniel Nestor (champions)
3. (France) Michaël Llodra / (Serbia) Nenad Zimonjić (final)
4. (India) Mahesh Bhupathi / (India) Leander Paes (semifinals)
5. (Austria) Jürgen Melzer / (Germany) Philipp Petzschner (second round)
6. (Poland) Mariusz Fyrstenberg / (Poland) Marcin Matkowski (semifinals)
7. (India) Rohan Bopanna / (Pakistan) Aisam-ul-Haq Qureshi (second round)
8. (Sweden) Robert Lindstedt / (Romania) Horia Tecău (quarterfinals)

== Draw ==
=== Key ===
- Q = Qualifier
- WC = Wild card
- LL = Lucky loser
- Alt = Alternate
- SE = Special exempt
- PR = Protected ranking
- ITF = ITF entry
- JE = Junior exempt
- w/o = Walkover
- r = Retired
- d = Defaulted
- SR = Special ranking

=== Finals ===
Semifinals
6	(Poland) Mariusz Fyrstenberg (Poland) Marcin Matkowski	2	6^{5}
3	(France) Michaël Llodra (Serbia) Nenad Zimonjić	6	7^{7}
4	(India) Mahesh Bhupathi (India) Leander Paes	1	4
2	(Belarus) Max Mirnyi (Canada) Daniel Nestor	6	6

Final
3	(France) Michaël Llodra (Serbia) Nenad Zimonjić	6	1	[10]
2	(Belarus) Max Mirnyi (Canada) Daniel Nestor	3	6	[12]

=== Top half ===
First round
(Spain) M Granollers (Serbia) V Troicki	2	7	[10]
(The Bahamas) M Knowles (Poland) Ł Kubot	6	6^{5}	[7]
WC	(China) M Gong (China) Z Li	6^{5}	6^{5}
(Spain) T Robredo (Russia) D Tursunov	7^{7}	7^{7}
(Italy) S Bolelli (Italy) F Fognini	6	6
WC	(China) D Wu (China) Z Zhang	4	4
(United States) E Butorac (Curaçao) J-J Rojer	7^{7}	4	[10]
(Czech Republic) T Berdych (Czech Republic) R Štěpánek	6^{4}	6	[7]

Second round
1	(United States) B Bryan (United States) M Bryan	6	6
(Spain) M Granollers (Serbia) V Troicki	1	4
(Spain) T Robredo (Russia) D Tursunov	1	2
6	(Poland) M Fyrstenberg (Poland) M Matkowski	6	6
3	(France) M Llodra (Serbia) N Zimonjić	5	6	[10]
(Italy) S Bolelli (Italy) F Fognini	7	3	[6]
(United States) E Butorac (Curaçao) J-J Rojer	6^{5}	5
8	(Sweden) R Lindstedt (Romania) H Tecău	7^{7}	7

Quarterfinals
1	(United States) B Bryan (United States) M Bryan	6	4	[10]
6	(Poland) M Fyrstenberg (Poland) M Matkowski	3	6	[12]
3	(France) M Llodra (Serbia) N Zimonjić	7^{7}	3	[10]
8	(Sweden) R Lindstedt (Romania) H Tecău	6^{4}	6	[7]

Semifinals
6	(Poland) M Fyrstenberg (Poland) M Matkowski	2	6^{5}
3	(France) M Llodra (Serbia) N Zimonjić	6	7^{7}

=== Bottom half ===
First round
(Brazil) T Bellucci (Croatia) I Dodig	6^{6}	6	[11]
(Spain) F López (Spain) F Verdasco	7^{8}	3	[9]
(Germany) C Kas (Austria) A Peya	4	6	[10]
(Spain) M López (Spain) R Nadal	6	4	[8]
(Spain) N Almagro (Brazil) B Soares	6	6
(South Africa) K Anderson (United States) S Lipsky	2	3
(Austria) O Marach (Serbia) J Tipsarević	6	4	[11]
(United States) A Bogomolov Jr. (United States) R Ram	2	6	[9]

Second round
5	(Austria) J Melzer (Germany) P Petzschner	4	7^{7}	[8]
(Brazil) T Bellucci (Croatia) I Dodig	6	6^{6}	[10]
(Germany) C Kas (Austria) A Peya	3	4
4	(India) M Bhupathi (India) L Paes	6	6
7	(India) R Bopanna (Pakistan) A-u-H Qureshi	6^{8}	4
(Spain) N Almagro (Brazil) B Soares	7^{10}	6
(Austria) O Marach (Serbia) J Tipsarević	2	3
2	(Belarus) M Mirnyi (Canada) D Nestor	6	6

Quarterfinals
(Brazil) T Bellucci (Croatia) I Dodig	3	4
4	(India) M Bhupathi (India) L Paes	6	6
(Spain) N Almagro (Brazil) B Soares	2	2
2	(Belarus) M Mirnyi (Canada) D Nestor	6	6

Semifinals
4	(India) M Bhupathi (India) L Paes	1	4
2	(Belarus) M Mirnyi (Canada) D Nestor	6	6
