= 2011 Erste Bank Open =

- Date: 25–30 October
- Edition: 37th
- Category: World Tour 250 Series
- Draw: 28S / 16D
- Prize money: €575,250
- Surface: Hard / indoor
- Location: Vienna, Austria
- Venue: Wiener Stadthalle

Champions

Singles
- (France) Jo-Wilfried Tsonga

Doubles
- (United States) Bob Bryan / (United States) Mike Bryan
- Vienna Open

The 2011 Erste Bank Open was a men's tennis tournament to be played on indoor hard courts. It is the 37th edition of the event known that year as the Erste Bank Open, and part of the ATP World Tour 250 Series of the 2011 ATP World Tour. It is held at the Wiener Stadthalle in Vienna, Austria, from 25 October through 30 October 2011. First-seeded Jo-Wilfried Tsonga won the singles title.

== Finals ==
=== Singles ===
(France) Jo-Wilfried Tsonga defeated (Argentina) Juan Martín del Potro, 6–7^{(5–7)}, 6–3, 6–4

- It was Tsonga's 2nd title of the year and 7th of his career.

=== Doubles ===
(United States) Bob Bryan / (United States) Mike Bryan defeated (Belarus) Max Mirnyi / (Canada) Daniel Nestor, 7–6^{(12–10)}, 6–3

== ATP entrants ==
=== Seeds ===
Country	Player	Rank^{1}	Seed
FRA	Jo-Wilfried Tsonga	9	1
ARG	Juan Martín del Potro	15	2
AUT	Jürgen Melzer	25	3
CZE	Radek Štěpánek	26	4
ARG	Juan Ignacio Chela	28	5
RSA	Kevin Anderson	31	6
RUS	Nikolay Davydenko	38	7
ITA	Fabio Fognini	39	8

- Seeds are based on the rankings of October 17, 2011.

=== Other entrants ===
The following players received wildcards into the singles main draw:

- (Austria) Martin Fischer
- (Austria) Thomas Muster
- (Austria) Dominic Thiem

The following players received entry from the qualifying draw:

- (Slovenia) Aljaž Bedene
- (Germany) Daniel Brands
- (Belgium) Steve Darcis
- (Germany) Tommy Haas
