= 2011 ATP World Tour =

Men's tennis circuit

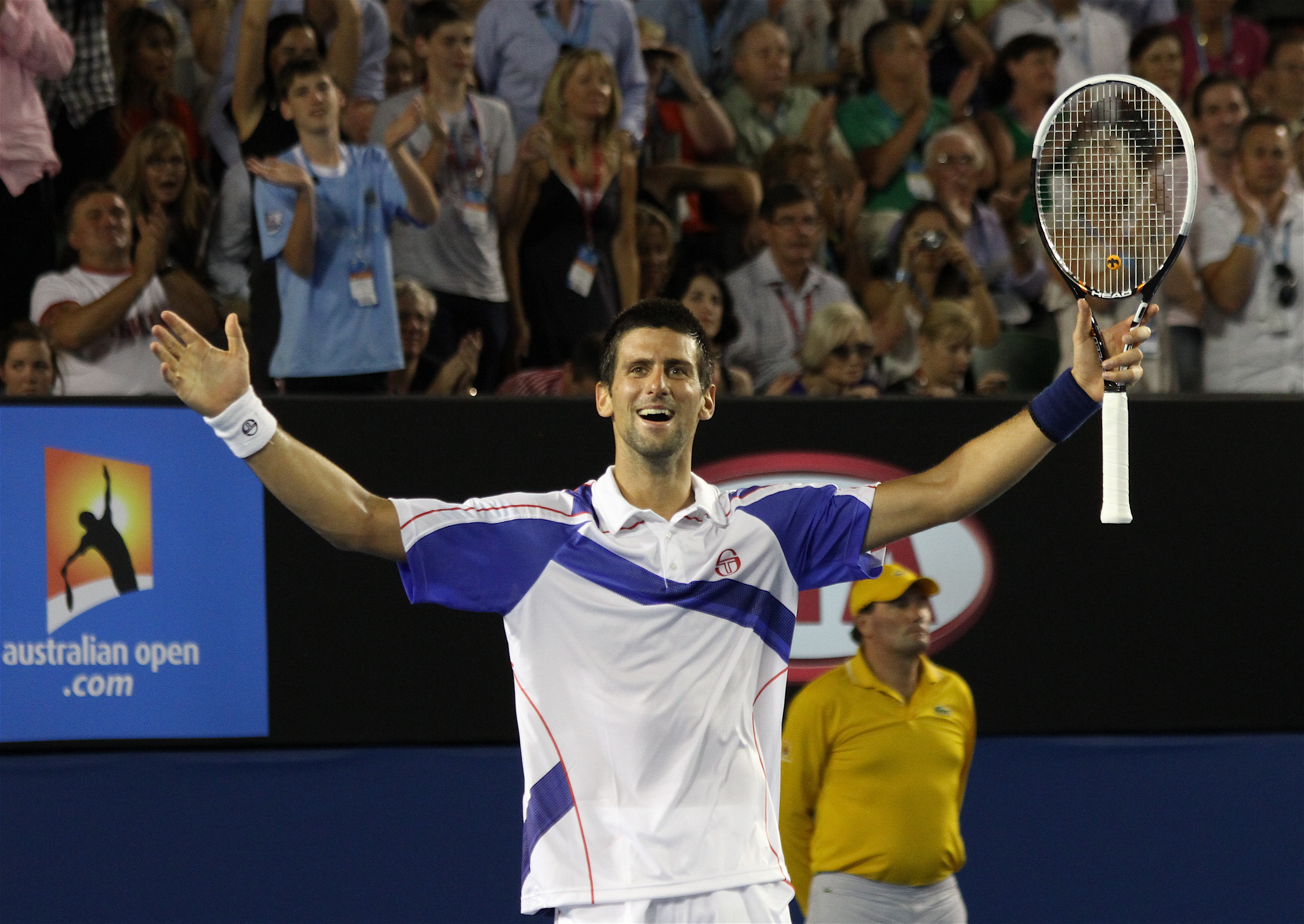
- Novak Djokovic finished the year as world No. 1 for the first time in his career. He won ten tournaments during the season, including three majors at the Australian Open, Wimbledon Championships, and the US Open. He also won five Masters 1000 events.

Details
- Duration: 1 January 2011 – 4 December 2011
- Edition: 42nd
- Tournaments: 69

Achievements (singles)
- Most titles: (Serbia) Novak Djokovic (10)
- Most finals: (Serbia) Novak Djokovic (11)
- Prize money leader: (Serbia) Novak Djokovic ($12,619,803)
- Points leader: (Serbia) Novak Djokovic (13,630)

Awards
- Player of the year: (Serbia) Novak Djokovic
- Doubles team of the year: (United States) Bob Bryan (United States) Mike Bryan
- Most improved player of the year: (United States) Alex Bogomolov Jr.
- Newcomer of the year: (Canada) Milos Raonic
- Comeback player of the year: (Argentina) Juan Martín del Potro

The 2011 ATP World Tour was the elite men's professional tennis circuit organized by the Association of Tennis Professionals (ATP) for the 2011 season. It was the 42nd edition of the tour and the calendar comprised the Grand Slam tournaments, supervised by the International Tennis Federation (ITF), the ATP World Tour Masters 1000, the ATP World Tour 500 series, the ATP World Tour 250 series, the ATP World Team Championship, the Davis Cup (organized by the ITF), and the ATP World Tour Finals. Also included in the 2011 calendar is the Hopman Cup, which does not distribute ranking points, and is organized by the ITF.

In singles, Novak Djokovic dominated the season. He won ten tournaments, including three Grand Slam (Australian Open, Wimbledon Championships and the US Open), and five Masters Series 1000 titles (Indian Wells, Miami, Madrid, Rome and Canada). He ended the year with a 6–0 record against Rafael Nadal and a 4–1 record against Roger Federer.

== Schedule ==
This is the complete schedule of events on the 2011 calendar, with player progression documented from the quarterfinals stage.

Key

Grand Slam
ATP World Tour Finals
ATP World Tour Masters 1000
ATP World Tour 500
ATP World Tour 250
Team Events

=== January ===
Week	Tournament	Champions	Runners-up	Semifinalists	Quarterfinalists
3 Jan	Hyundai Hopman Cup; Perth, Australia; ITF Mixed Team Championships; Hard (i) – A$1,000,000 – 8 teams (RR)	United States; 2–1	Belgium	Round Robin (Group A) Serbia ^{[a]} Australia; Kazakhstan	Round Robin (Group B) France; Italy; Great Britain
3 Jan	Brisbane International; Brisbane, Australia; ATP World Tour 250; Hard – $372,500 – 32S/16D; Singles – Doubles	(Sweden) Robin Söderling; 6–3, 7–5	(United States) Andy Roddick	(Czech Republic) Radek Štěpánek (South Africa) Kevin Anderson	(Australia) Matthew Ebden (Germany) Florian Mayer (Colombia) Santiago Giraldo (Cyprus) Marcos Baghdatis
3 Jan	Brisbane International; Brisbane, Australia; ATP World Tour 250; Hard – $372,500 – 32S/16D; Singles – Doubles	(Czech Republic) Lukáš Dlouhý (Australia) Paul Hanley; 6–4, retired^{[b]}	(Sweden) Robert Lindstedt (Romania) Horia Tecău	(Czech Republic) Radek Štěpánek (South Africa) Kevin Anderson	(Australia) Matthew Ebden (Germany) Florian Mayer (Colombia) Santiago Giraldo (Cyprus) Marcos Baghdatis
3 Jan	Aircel Chennai Open; Chennai, India; ATP World Tour 250; Hard – $398,250 – 32S/16D; Singles – Doubles	(Switzerland) Stanislas Wawrinka; 7–5, 4–6, 6–1	(Belgium) Xavier Malisse	(Czech Republic) Tomáš Berdych (Serbia) Janko Tipsarević	(Slovenia) Blaž Kavčič (Netherlands) Robin Haase (Germany) Björn Phau (Japan) Kei Nishikori
3 Jan	Aircel Chennai Open; Chennai, India; ATP World Tour 250; Hard – $398,250 – 32S/16D; Singles – Doubles	(India) Mahesh Bhupathi (India) Leander Paes; 6–2, 6–7^{(3–7)}, [10–7]	(Netherlands) Robin Haase (United States) David Martin	(Czech Republic) Tomáš Berdych (Serbia) Janko Tipsarević	(Slovenia) Blaž Kavčič (Netherlands) Robin Haase (Germany) Björn Phau (Japan) Kei Nishikori
3 Jan	Qatar Open; Doha, Qatar; ATP World Tour 250; Hard – $1,024,000 – 32S/16D; Singles – Doubles	(Switzerland) Roger Federer; 6–3, 6–4	(Russia) Nikolay Davydenko	(Spain) Rafael Nadal (France) Jo-Wilfried Tsonga	(Latvia) Ernests Gulbis (Croatia) Ivo Karlović (Spain) Guillermo García López (Serbia) Viktor Troicki
3 Jan	Qatar Open; Doha, Qatar; ATP World Tour 250; Hard – $1,024,000 – 32S/16D; Singles – Doubles	(Spain) Marc López (Spain) Rafael Nadal; 6–3, 7–6^{(7–4)}	(Italy) Daniele Bracciali (Italy) Andreas Seppi	(Spain) Rafael Nadal (France) Jo-Wilfried Tsonga	(Latvia) Ernests Gulbis (Croatia) Ivo Karlović (Spain) Guillermo García López (Serbia) Viktor Troicki
10 Jan	Medibank International Sydney; Sydney, Australia; ATP World Tour 250; Hard – $372,500 – 28S/16D; Singles – Doubles	(France) Gilles Simon; 7–5, 7–6^{(7–4)}	(Serbia) Viktor Troicki	(Latvia) Ernests Gulbis (Germany) Florian Mayer	(Ukraine) Alexandr Dolgopolov (Ukraine) Sergiy Stakhovsky (France) Richard Gasquet (Italy) Potito Starace
10 Jan	Medibank International Sydney; Sydney, Australia; ATP World Tour 250; Hard – $372,500 – 28S/16D; Singles – Doubles	(Czech Republic) Lukáš Dlouhý (Australia) Paul Hanley; 6–7^{(6–8)}, 6–3, [10–5]	(United States) Bob Bryan (United States) Mike Bryan	(Latvia) Ernests Gulbis (Germany) Florian Mayer	(Ukraine) Alexandr Dolgopolov (Ukraine) Sergiy Stakhovsky (France) Richard Gasquet (Italy) Potito Starace
10 Jan	Heineken Open; Auckland, New Zealand; ATP World Tour 250; Hard – $355,500 – 28S/16D; Singles – Doubles	(Spain) David Ferrer; 6–3, 6–2	(Argentina) David Nalbandian	(Colombia) Santiago Giraldo (Spain) Nicolás Almagro	(Germany) Philipp Kohlschreiber (Brazil) Thomaz Bellucci (United States) John Isner (France) Adrian Mannarino
10 Jan	Heineken Open; Auckland, New Zealand; ATP World Tour 250; Hard – $355,500 – 28S/16D; Singles – Doubles	(Spain) Marcel Granollers (Spain) Tommy Robredo; 6–4, 7–6^{(8–6)}	(Sweden) Johan Brunström (Australia) Stephen Huss	(Colombia) Santiago Giraldo (Spain) Nicolás Almagro	(Germany) Philipp Kohlschreiber (Brazil) Thomaz Bellucci (United States) John Isner (France) Adrian Mannarino
17 Jan; 24 Jan	Australian Open; Melbourne, Australia; Grand Slam; Hard – A$10,712,240; 128S/164D/32X; Singles – Doubles – Mixed doubles	(Serbia) Novak Djokovic; 6–4, 6–2, 6–3	(United Kingdom) Andy Murray	(Spain) David Ferrer (Switzerland) Roger Federer	(Spain) Rafael Nadal (Ukraine) Alexandr Dolgopolov (Czech Republic) Tomáš Berdych (Switzerland) Stanislas Wawrinka
17 Jan; 24 Jan	Australian Open; Melbourne, Australia; Grand Slam; Hard – A$10,712,240; 128S/164D/32X; Singles – Doubles – Mixed doubles	(United States) Bob Bryan (United States) Mike Bryan; 6–3, 6–4	(India) Mahesh Bhupathi (India) Leander Paes	(Spain) David Ferrer (Switzerland) Roger Federer	(Spain) Rafael Nadal (Ukraine) Alexandr Dolgopolov (Czech Republic) Tomáš Berdych (Switzerland) Stanislas Wawrinka
17 Jan; 24 Jan	Australian Open; Melbourne, Australia; Grand Slam; Hard – A$10,712,240; 128S/164D/32X; Singles – Doubles – Mixed doubles	(Canada) Daniel Nestor (Slovenia) Katarina Srebotnik; 6–3, 3–6, [10–7]	(Australia) Paul Hanley (Chinese Taipei) Chan Yung-jan	(Spain) David Ferrer (Switzerland) Roger Federer	(Spain) Rafael Nadal (Ukraine) Alexandr Dolgopolov (Czech Republic) Tomáš Berdych (Switzerland) Stanislas Wawrinka
31 Jan	SA Tennis Open; Johannesburg, South Africa; ATP World Tour 250; Hard – $442,500 – 32S/16D; Singles – Doubles	(South Africa) Kevin Anderson; 4–6, 6–3, 6–2	(India) Somdev Devvarman	(France) Adrian Mannarino (South Africa) Izak van der Merwe	(Canada) Frank Dancevic (Slovakia) Karol Beck (South Africa) Rik de Voest (Germany) Simon Greul
31 Jan	SA Tennis Open; Johannesburg, South Africa; ATP World Tour 250; Hard – $442,500 – 32S/16D; Singles – Doubles	(United States) James Cerretani (Canada) Adil Shamasdin; 6–3, 3–6, [10–7]	(United States) Scott Lipsky (United States) Rajeev Ram	(France) Adrian Mannarino (South Africa) Izak van der Merwe	(Canada) Frank Dancevic (Slovakia) Karol Beck (South Africa) Rik de Voest (Germany) Simon Greul
31 Jan	PBZ Zagreb Indoors; Zagreb, Croatia; ATP World Tour 250; Hard (i) – €398,250 – 28S/16D; Singles – Doubles	(Croatia) Ivan Dodig; 6–3, 6–4	(Germany) Michael Berrer	(Germany) Florian Mayer (Spain) Guillermo García López	(Croatia) Marin Čilić (France) Richard Gasquet (United States) Alex Bogomolov Jr. (Croatia) Ivan Ljubičić
31 Jan	PBZ Zagreb Indoors; Zagreb, Croatia; ATP World Tour 250; Hard (i) – €398,250 – 28S/16D; Singles – Doubles	(Belgium) Dick Norman (Romania) Horia Tecău; 6–3, 6–4	(Spain) Marcel Granollers (Spain) Marc López	(Germany) Florian Mayer (Spain) Guillermo García López	(Croatia) Marin Čilić (France) Richard Gasquet (United States) Alex Bogomolov Jr. (Croatia) Ivan Ljubičić
31 Jan	Movistar Open; Santiago, Chile; ATP World Tour 250; Clay – $398,250 – 32S/16D; Singles – Doubles	(Spain) Tommy Robredo; 6–2, 2–6, 7–6^{(7–5)}	(Colombia) Santiago Giraldo	(Italy) Potito Starace (Italy) Fabio Fognini	(Argentina) Horacio Zeballos (Argentina) Juan Ignacio Chela (Brazil) Thomaz Bellucci (Argentina) Máximo González
31 Jan	Movistar Open; Santiago, Chile; ATP World Tour 250; Clay – $398,250 – 32S/16D; Singles – Doubles	(Brazil) Marcelo Melo (Brazil) Bruno Soares; 6–3, 7–6^{(7–3)}	(Poland) Łukasz Kubot (Austria) Oliver Marach	(Italy) Potito Starace (Italy) Fabio Fognini	(Argentina) Horacio Zeballos (Argentina) Juan Ignacio Chela (Brazil) Thomaz Bellucci (Argentina) Máximo González

=== February ===
Week	Tournament	Champions	Runners-up	Semifinalists	Quarterfinalists
7 Feb	ABN AMRO World Tennis Tournament; Rotterdam, Netherlands; ATP World Tour 500; Hard (i) – €1,150,000 – 32S/16D; Singles – Doubles	(Sweden) Robin Söderling; 6–3, 3–6, 6–3	(France) Jo-Wilfried Tsonga	(Serbia) Viktor Troicki (Croatia) Ivan Ljubičić	(Russia) Mikhail Youzhny (Croatia) Marin Čilić (Czech Republic) Tomáš Berdych (Cyprus) Marcos Baghdatis
7 Feb	ABN AMRO World Tennis Tournament; Rotterdam, Netherlands; ATP World Tour 500; Hard (i) – €1,150,000 – 32S/16D; Singles – Doubles	(Austria) Jürgen Melzer (Germany) Philipp Petzschner; 6–4, 3–6, [10–5]	(France) Michaël Llodra (Serbia) Nenad Zimonjić^{[c]}	(Serbia) Viktor Troicki (Croatia) Ivan Ljubičić	(Russia) Mikhail Youzhny (Croatia) Marin Čilić (Czech Republic) Tomáš Berdych (Cyprus) Marcos Baghdatis
7 Feb	SAP Open; San Jose, United States; ATP World Tour 250; Hard (i) – $531,000 – 32S/16D; Singles – Doubles	(Canada) Milos Raonic^{[d]} 7–6^{(8–6)}, 7–6^{(7–5)}	(Spain) Fernando Verdasco	(Argentina) Juan Martín del Potro (France) Gaël Monfils^{[d]}	(Uzbekistan) Denis Istomin (Australia) Lleyton Hewitt (Lithuania) Ričardas Berankis (United States) Tim Smyczek
7 Feb	SAP Open; San Jose, United States; ATP World Tour 250; Hard (i) – $531,000 – 32S/16D; Singles – Doubles	(United States) Scott Lipsky (United States) Rajeev Ram; 6–4, 4–6, [10–8]	(Colombia) Alejandro Falla (Belgium) Xavier Malisse	(Argentina) Juan Martín del Potro (France) Gaël Monfils^{[d]}	(Uzbekistan) Denis Istomin (Australia) Lleyton Hewitt (Lithuania) Ričardas Berankis (United States) Tim Smyczek
7 Feb	Brasil Open; Costa do Sauípe, Brazil; ATP World Tour 250; Clay – $442,500 – 28S/16D; Singles – Doubles	(Spain) Nicolás Almagro; 6–3, 7–6^{(7–3)}	(Ukraine) Alexandr Dolgopolov	(Argentina) Juan Ignacio Chela (Brazil) Ricardo Mello	(Portugal) Rui Machado (Brazil) Thomaz Bellucci (Italy) Potito Starace (Spain) Pablo Andújar
7 Feb	Brasil Open; Costa do Sauípe, Brazil; ATP World Tour 250; Clay – $442,500 – 28S/16D; Singles – Doubles	(Brazil) Marcelo Melo (Brazil) Bruno Soares; 7–6^{(7–4)}, 6–3	(Spain) Pablo Andújar (Spain) Daniel Gimeno Traver	(Argentina) Juan Ignacio Chela (Brazil) Ricardo Mello	(Portugal) Rui Machado (Brazil) Thomaz Bellucci (Italy) Potito Starace (Spain) Pablo Andújar
14 Feb	Regions Morgan Keegan Championships; Memphis, United States; ATP World Tour 500; Hard (i) – $1,100,000 – 32S/16D; Singles – Doubles	(United States) Andy Roddick; 7–6^{(9–7)}, 6–7^{(11–13)}, 7–5	(Canada) Milos Raonic	(Argentina) Juan Martín del Potro (United States) Mardy Fish	(Australia) Lleyton Hewitt (United States) Michael Russell (United States) Sam Querrey (United States) Robert Kendrick
14 Feb	Regions Morgan Keegan Championships; Memphis, United States; ATP World Tour 500; Hard (i) – $1,100,000 – 32S/16D; Singles – Doubles	(Belarus) Max Mirnyi (Canada) Daniel Nestor; 6–2, 6–7^{(6–8)}, [10–3]	(United States) Eric Butorac (Curaçao) Jean-Julien Rojer	(Argentina) Juan Martín del Potro (United States) Mardy Fish	(Australia) Lleyton Hewitt (United States) Michael Russell (United States) Sam Querrey (United States) Robert Kendrick
14 Feb	Open 13; Marseille, France; ATP World Tour 250; Hard (i) – €512,750 – 28S/16D; Singles – Doubles	(Sweden) Robin Söderling; 6–7^{(8–10)}, 6–3, 6–3	(Croatia) Marin Čilić	(Russia) Dmitry Tursunov (Russia) Mikhail Youzhny	(France) Michaël Llodra (Austria) Jürgen Melzer (France) Jo-Wilfried Tsonga (Czech Republic) Tomáš Berdych
14 Feb	Open 13; Marseille, France; ATP World Tour 250; Hard (i) – €512,750 – 28S/16D; Singles – Doubles	(Netherlands) Robin Haase (United Kingdom) Ken Skupski; 6–3, 6–7^{(4–7)}, [13–11]	(France) Julien Benneteau (France) Jo-Wilfried Tsonga	(Russia) Dmitry Tursunov (Russia) Mikhail Youzhny	(France) Michaël Llodra (Austria) Jürgen Melzer (France) Jo-Wilfried Tsonga (Czech Republic) Tomáš Berdych
14 Feb	Copa Claro; Buenos Aires, Argentina; ATP World Tour 250; Clay – $475,300 – 32S/16D; Singles – Doubles	(Spain) Nicolás Almagro; 6–3, 3–6, 6–4	(Argentina) Juan Ignacio Chela	(Spain) Tommy Robredo (Switzerland) Stanislas Wawrinka	(Argentina) José Acasuso (Argentina) David Nalbandian (Spain) Albert Montañés (Argentina) Juan Mónaco
14 Feb	Copa Claro; Buenos Aires, Argentina; ATP World Tour 250; Clay – $475,300 – 32S/16D; Singles – Doubles	(Austria) Oliver Marach (Argentina) Leonardo Mayer; 7–6^{(8–6)}, 6–3	(Brazil) Franco Ferreiro (Brazil) André Sá	(Spain) Tommy Robredo (Switzerland) Stanislas Wawrinka	(Argentina) José Acasuso (Argentina) David Nalbandian (Spain) Albert Montañés (Argentina) Juan Mónaco
21 Feb	Dubai Duty Free Tennis Championships; Dubai, United Arab Emirates; ATP World Tour 500; Hard – $1,619,500 – 32S/16D; Singles – Doubles	(Serbia) Novak Djokovic; 6–3, 6–3	(Switzerland) Roger Federer	(France) Richard Gasquet (Czech Republic) Tomáš Berdych^{[e]}	(Ukraine) Sergiy Stakhovsky (France) Gilles Simon (Germany) Philipp Petzschner (Germany) Florian Mayer
21 Feb	Dubai Duty Free Tennis Championships; Dubai, United Arab Emirates; ATP World Tour 500; Hard – $1,619,500 – 32S/16D; Singles – Doubles	(Ukraine) Sergiy Stakhovsky (Russia) Mikhail Youzhny; 4–6, 6–3, [10–3]	(France) Jérémy Chardy (Spain) Feliciano López	(France) Richard Gasquet (Czech Republic) Tomáš Berdych^{[e]}	(Ukraine) Sergiy Stakhovsky (France) Gilles Simon (Germany) Philipp Petzschner (Germany) Florian Mayer
21 Feb	Abierto Mexicano Telcel; Acapulco, Mexico; ATP World Tour 500; Clay – $955,000 – 32S/16D; Singles – Doubles	(Spain) David Ferrer; 7–6^{(7–4)}, 6–7^{(2–7)}, 6–2	(Spain) Nicolás Almagro	(Ukraine) Alexandr Dolgopolov (Brazil) Thomaz Bellucci	(Argentina) Juan Mónaco (Switzerland) Stanislas Wawrinka (Colombia) Santiago Giraldo (Poland) Łukasz Kubot
21 Feb	Abierto Mexicano Telcel; Acapulco, Mexico; ATP World Tour 500; Clay – $955,000 – 32S/16D; Singles – Doubles	(Romania) Victor Hănescu (Romania) Horia Tecău; 6–1, 6–3	(Brazil) Marcelo Melo (Brazil) Bruno Soares	(Ukraine) Alexandr Dolgopolov (Brazil) Thomaz Bellucci	(Argentina) Juan Mónaco (Switzerland) Stanislas Wawrinka (Colombia) Santiago Giraldo (Poland) Łukasz Kubot
21 Feb	Delray Beach International Tennis Championships; Delray Beach, United States; ATP World Tour 250; Hard – $442,500 – 32S/16D; Singles – Doubles	(Argentina) Juan Martín del Potro; 6–4, 6–4	(Serbia) Janko Tipsarević	(Japan) Kei Nishikori (United States) Mardy Fish	(Croatia) Ivan Dodig (United States) Ryan Sweeting (South Africa) Kevin Anderson (Colombia) Alejandro Falla
21 Feb	Delray Beach International Tennis Championships; Delray Beach, United States; ATP World Tour 250; Hard – $442,500 – 32S/16D; Singles – Doubles	(United States) Scott Lipsky (United States) Rajeev Ram; 4–6, 6–4, [10–3]	(Germany) Christopher Kas (Austria) Alexander Peya	(Japan) Kei Nishikori (United States) Mardy Fish	(Croatia) Ivan Dodig (United States) Ryan Sweeting (South Africa) Kevin Anderson (Colombia) Alejandro Falla
28 Feb	Davis Cup by BNP Paribas First Round; Novi Sad, Serbia – hard (i); Borås, Sweden – hard (i); Ostrava, Czech Republic – hard (i); Buenos Aires, Argentina – clay Santiago, Chile – clay Charleroi, Belgium – hard (i); Zagreb, Croatia – hard (i); Vienna, Austria – clay (i)	First Round winners Serbia 4–1; Sweden 3–2; Kazakhstan 3–2; Argentina 4–1; United States 4–1; Spain 4–1; Germany 3–2; France 3–2	First Round losers India; Russia; Czech Republic; Romania; Chile; Belgium; Croatia; Austria		

=== March ===
Week	Tournament	Champions	Runners-up	Semifinalists	Quarterfinalists
7 Mar; 14 Mar	BNP Paribas Open; Indian Wells, United States; ATP World Tour Masters 1000; Hard – $3,645,000 – 96S/32D; Singles – Doubles	(Serbia) Novak Djokovic; 4–6, 6–3, 6–2	(Spain) Rafael Nadal	(Argentina) Juan Martín del Potro (Switzerland) Roger Federer	(Croatia) Ivo Karlović (Spain) Tommy Robredo^{[f]} (France) Richard Gasquet (Switzerland) Stanislas Wawrinka
7 Mar; 14 Mar	BNP Paribas Open; Indian Wells, United States; ATP World Tour Masters 1000; Hard – $3,645,000 – 96S/32D; Singles – Doubles	(Ukraine) Alexandr Dolgopolov (Belgium) Xavier Malisse; 6–4, 6–7^{(5–7)}, [10–7]	(Switzerland) Roger Federer (Switzerland) Stanislas Wawrinka	(Argentina) Juan Martín del Potro (Switzerland) Roger Federer	(Croatia) Ivo Karlović (Spain) Tommy Robredo^{[f]} (France) Richard Gasquet (Switzerland) Stanislas Wawrinka
21 Mar; 28 Mar	Sony Ericsson Open; Key Biscayne, United States; ATP World Tour Masters 1000; Hard – $3,645,000 – 96S/32D; Singles – Doubles	(Serbia) Novak Djokovic; 4–6, 6–3, 7–6^{(7–4)}	(Spain) Rafael Nadal	(Switzerland) Roger Federer (United States) Mardy Fish	(Czech Republic) Tomáš Berdych (France) Gilles Simon^{[g]} (Spain) David Ferrer (South Africa) Kevin Anderson
21 Mar; 28 Mar	Sony Ericsson Open; Key Biscayne, United States; ATP World Tour Masters 1000; Hard – $3,645,000 – 96S/32D; Singles – Doubles	(India) Mahesh Bhupathi (India) Leander Paes; 6–7^{(5–7)}, 6–2, [10–5]	(Belarus) Max Mirnyi (Canada) Daniel Nestor	(Switzerland) Roger Federer (United States) Mardy Fish	(Czech Republic) Tomáš Berdych (France) Gilles Simon^{[g]} (Spain) David Ferrer (South Africa) Kevin Anderson

=== April ===
Week	Tournament	Champions	Runners-up	Semifinalists	Quarterfinalists
4 Apr	US Men's Clay Court Championships; Houston, United States; ATP World Tour 250; Clay (maroon) – $442,500 – 28S/16D; Singles – Doubles	(United States) Ryan Sweeting; 6–4, 7–6^{(7–3)}	(Japan) Kei Nishikori	(Uruguay) Pablo Cuevas (Croatia) Ivo Karlović	(United States) Mardy Fish (Spain) Guillermo García López (United States) John Isner (Russia) Teymuraz Gabashvili
4 Apr	US Men's Clay Court Championships; Houston, United States; ATP World Tour 250; Clay (maroon) – $442,500 – 28S/16D; Singles – Doubles	(United States) Bob Bryan (United States) Mike Bryan; 6–7^{(4–7)}, 6–2, [10–5]	(United States) John Isner (United States) Sam Querrey	(Uruguay) Pablo Cuevas (Croatia) Ivo Karlović	(United States) Mardy Fish (Spain) Guillermo García López (United States) John Isner (Russia) Teymuraz Gabashvili
4 Apr	Grand Prix Hassan II; Casablanca, Morocco; ATP World Tour 250; Clay – €398,250 – 28S/16D; Singles – Doubles	(Spain) Pablo Andújar; 6–1, 6–2	(Italy) Potito Starace	(Spain) Albert Montañés (Romania) Victor Hănescu	(Italy) Fabio Fognini (Spain) Pere Riba (France) Gilles Simon (Russia) Andrey Kuznetsov
4 Apr	Grand Prix Hassan II; Casablanca, Morocco; ATP World Tour 250; Clay – €398,250 – 28S/16D; Singles – Doubles	(Sweden) Robert Lindstedt (Romania) Horia Tecău; 6–2, 6–1	(United Kingdom) Colin Fleming (Slovakia) Igor Zelenay	(Spain) Albert Montañés (Romania) Victor Hănescu	(Italy) Fabio Fognini (Spain) Pere Riba (France) Gilles Simon (Russia) Andrey Kuznetsov
11 Apr	Monte-Carlo Rolex Masters; Roquebrune-Cap-Martin, France; ATP World Tour Masters 1000; Clay – €2,227,500 – 56S/24D; Singles – Doubles	(Spain) Rafael Nadal; 6–4, 7–5	(Spain) David Ferrer	(United Kingdom) Andy Murray (Austria) Jürgen Melzer	(Croatia) Ivan Ljubičić (Portugal) Frederico Gil (Serbia) Viktor Troicki (Switzerland) Roger Federer
11 Apr	Monte-Carlo Rolex Masters; Roquebrune-Cap-Martin, France; ATP World Tour Masters 1000; Clay – €2,227,500 – 56S/24D; Singles – Doubles	(United States) Bob Bryan (United States) Mike Bryan; 6–3, 6–2	(Argentina) Juan Ignacio Chela (Brazil) Bruno Soares	(United Kingdom) Andy Murray (Austria) Jürgen Melzer	(Croatia) Ivan Ljubičić (Portugal) Frederico Gil (Serbia) Viktor Troicki (Switzerland) Roger Federer
18 Apr	Barcelona Open Banco Sabadell; Barcelona, Spain; ATP World Tour 500; Clay – €1,550,000 – 56S/24D; Singles – Doubles	(Spain) Rafael Nadal; 6–2, 6–4	(Spain) David Ferrer	(Croatia) Ivan Dodig (Spain) Nicolás Almagro	(France) Gaël Monfils (Spain) Feliciano López (Austria) Jürgen Melzer (Spain) Juan Carlos Ferrero
18 Apr	Barcelona Open Banco Sabadell; Barcelona, Spain; ATP World Tour 500; Clay – €1,550,000 – 56S/24D; Singles – Doubles	(Mexico) Santiago González (United States) Scott Lipsky; 5–7, 6–2, [12–10]	(United States) Bob Bryan (United States) Mike Bryan	(Croatia) Ivan Dodig (Spain) Nicolás Almagro	(France) Gaël Monfils (Spain) Feliciano López (Austria) Jürgen Melzer (Spain) Juan Carlos Ferrero
25 Apr	BMW Open; Munich, Germany; ATP World Tour 250; Clay – €398,250 – 32S/16D; Singles – Doubles	(Russia) Nikolay Davydenko; 6–3, 3–6, 6–1	(Germany) Florian Mayer	(Germany) Philipp Petzschner (Czech Republic) Radek Štěpánek	(Italy) Potito Starace (Bulgaria) Grigor Dimitrov (Croatia) Marin Čilić (Germany) Philipp Kohlschreiber
25 Apr	BMW Open; Munich, Germany; ATP World Tour 250; Clay – €398,250 – 32S/16D; Singles – Doubles	(Italy) Simone Bolelli (Argentina) Horacio Zeballos; 7–6^{(7–3)}, 6–4	(Germany) Andreas Beck (Germany) Christopher Kas	(Germany) Philipp Petzschner (Czech Republic) Radek Štěpánek	(Italy) Potito Starace (Bulgaria) Grigor Dimitrov (Croatia) Marin Čilić (Germany) Philipp Kohlschreiber
25 Apr	Serbia Open; Belgrade, Serbia; ATP World Tour 250; Clay – €373,200 – 28S/16D; Singles – Doubles	(Serbia) Novak Djokovic; 7–6^{(7–4)}, 6–2	(Spain) Feliciano López	(Serbia) Janko Tipsarević^{[h]} (Italy) Filippo Volandri	(Slovenia) Blaž Kavčič (India) Somdev Devvarman (Spain) Albert Montañés (Spain) Marcel Granollers
25 Apr	Serbia Open; Belgrade, Serbia; ATP World Tour 250; Clay – €373,200 – 28S/16D; Singles – Doubles	(Czech Republic) František Čermák (Slovakia) Filip Polášek; 7–5, 6–2	(Austria) Oliver Marach (Austria) Alexander Peya	(Serbia) Janko Tipsarević^{[h]} (Italy) Filippo Volandri	(Slovenia) Blaž Kavčič (India) Somdev Devvarman (Spain) Albert Montañés (Spain) Marcel Granollers
25 Apr	Estoril Open; Oeiras, Portugal; ATP World Tour 250; Clay – €398,250 – 28S/16D; Singles – Doubles	(Argentina) Juan Martín del Potro; 6–2, 6–2	(Spain) Fernando Verdasco	(Uruguay) Pablo Cuevas (Canada) Milos Raonic^{[i]}	(Sweden) Robin Söderling (Brazil) Thomaz Bellucci (France) Gilles Simon (South Africa) Kevin Anderson
25 Apr	Estoril Open; Oeiras, Portugal; ATP World Tour 250; Clay – €398,250 – 28S/16D; Singles – Doubles	(United States) Eric Butorac (Curaçao) Jean-Julien Rojer; 6–3, 6–4	(Spain) Marc López (Spain) David Marrero	(Uruguay) Pablo Cuevas (Canada) Milos Raonic^{[i]}	(Sweden) Robin Söderling (Brazil) Thomaz Bellucci (France) Gilles Simon (South Africa) Kevin Anderson

=== May ===
Week	Tournament	Champions	Runners-up	Semifinalists	Quarterfinalists
2 May	Mutua Madrid Open; Madrid, Spain; ATP World Tour Masters 1000; Clay – €2,835,000 – 56S/24D; Singles – Doubles	(Serbia) Novak Djokovic; 7–5, 6–4	(Spain) Rafael Nadal	(Switzerland) Roger Federer (Brazil) Thomaz Bellucci	(France) Michaël Llodra (Sweden) Robin Söderling (Czech Republic) Tomáš Berdych (Spain) David Ferrer
2 May	Mutua Madrid Open; Madrid, Spain; ATP World Tour Masters 1000; Clay – €2,835,000 – 56S/24D; Singles – Doubles	(United States) Bob Bryan (United States) Mike Bryan; 6–3, 6–3	(France) Michaël Llodra (Serbia) Nenad Zimonjić	(Switzerland) Roger Federer (Brazil) Thomaz Bellucci	(France) Michaël Llodra (Sweden) Robin Söderling (Czech Republic) Tomáš Berdych (Spain) David Ferrer
9 May	Internazionali BNL d'Italia; Rome, Italy; ATP World Tour Masters 1000; Clay – €2,227,500 – 56S/24D; Singles – Doubles	(Serbia) Novak Djokovic; 6–4, 6–4	(Spain) Rafael Nadal	(France) Richard Gasquet (United Kingdom) Andy Murray	(Croatia) Marin Čilić (Czech Republic) Tomáš Berdych (Germany) Florian Mayer (Sweden) Robin Söderling
9 May	Internazionali BNL d'Italia; Rome, Italy; ATP World Tour Masters 1000; Clay – €2,227,500 – 56S/24D; Singles – Doubles	(United States) John Isner (United States) Sam Querrey walkover	(United States) Mardy Fish (United States) Andy Roddick^{[j]}	(France) Richard Gasquet (United Kingdom) Andy Murray	(Croatia) Marin Čilić (Czech Republic) Tomáš Berdych (Germany) Florian Mayer (Sweden) Robin Söderling
16 May	Power Horse World Team Cup; Düsseldorf, Germany; ATP World Team Championship; Clay – €1,100,000 – 8 teams (RR)	Germany; 2–1	Argentina	Round Robin (Red Group) United States; Sweden; Kazakhstan	Round Robin (Blue Group) Serbia; Russia; Spain
16 May	Open de Nice Côte d'Azur; Nice, France; ATP World Tour 250; Clay – €398,250 – 28S/16D; Singles – Doubles	(Spain) Nicolás Almagro; 6–7^{(5–7)}, 6–3, 6–3	(Romania) Victor Hănescu	(Ukraine) Alexandr Dolgopolov (Czech Republic) Tomáš Berdych	(Spain) David Ferrer (Netherlands) Robin Haase^{[k]} (Spain) Pablo Andújar (Latvia) Ernests Gulbis
16 May	Open de Nice Côte d'Azur; Nice, France; ATP World Tour 250; Clay – €398,250 – 28S/16D; Singles – Doubles	(United States) Eric Butorac (Curaçao) Jean-Julien Rojer; 6–3, 6–4	(Mexico) Santiago González (Spain) David Marrero	(Ukraine) Alexandr Dolgopolov (Czech Republic) Tomáš Berdych	(Spain) David Ferrer (Netherlands) Robin Haase^{[k]} (Spain) Pablo Andújar (Latvia) Ernests Gulbis
23 May; 30 May	French Open; Paris, France; Grand Slam; Clay – €7,580,800; 128S/164D/32X; Singles – Doubles – Mixed doubles	(Spain) Rafael Nadal; 7–5, 7–6^{(7–3)}, 5–7, 6–1	(Switzerland) Roger Federer	(United Kingdom) Andy Murray (Serbia) Novak Djokovic	(Sweden) Robin Söderling (Argentina) Juan Ignacio Chela (France) Gaël Monfils (Italy) Fabio Fognini^{[l]}
23 May; 30 May	French Open; Paris, France; Grand Slam; Clay – €7,580,800; 128S/164D/32X; Singles – Doubles – Mixed doubles	(Belarus) Max Mirnyi (Canada) Daniel Nestor; 7–6^{(7–3)}, 3–6, 6–4	(Colombia) Juan Sebastián Cabal (Argentina) Eduardo Schwank	(United Kingdom) Andy Murray (Serbia) Novak Djokovic	(Sweden) Robin Söderling (Argentina) Juan Ignacio Chela (France) Gaël Monfils (Italy) Fabio Fognini^{[l]}
23 May; 30 May	French Open; Paris, France; Grand Slam; Clay – €7,580,800; 128S/164D/32X; Singles – Doubles – Mixed doubles	(Australia) Casey Dellacqua (United States) Scott Lipsky; 7–6^{(8–6)}, 4–6, [10–7]	(Slovenia) Katarina Srebotnik (Serbia) Nenad Zimonjić	(United Kingdom) Andy Murray (Serbia) Novak Djokovic	(Sweden) Robin Söderling (Argentina) Juan Ignacio Chela (France) Gaël Monfils (Italy) Fabio Fognini^{[l]}

=== June ===
Week	Tournament	Champions	Runners-up	Semifinalists	Quarterfinalists
6 Jun	Gerry Weber Open; Halle, Germany; ATP World Tour 250; Grass – €663,750 – 32S/16D; Singles – Doubles	(Germany) Philipp Kohlschreiber; 7–6^{(7–5)}, 2–0 retired	(Germany) Philipp Petzschner	(France) Gaël Monfils (Czech Republic) Tomáš Berdych	(Australia) Lleyton Hewitt (Germany) Florian Mayer (Canada) Milos Raonic (Serbia) Viktor Troicki
6 Jun	Gerry Weber Open; Halle, Germany; ATP World Tour 250; Grass – €663,750 – 32S/16D; Singles – Doubles	(India) Rohan Bopanna (Pakistan) Aisam-ul-Haq Qureshi; 7–6^{(10–8)}, 3–6, [11–9]	(Netherlands) Robin Haase (Canada) Milos Raonic	(France) Gaël Monfils (Czech Republic) Tomáš Berdych	(Australia) Lleyton Hewitt (Germany) Florian Mayer (Canada) Milos Raonic (Serbia) Viktor Troicki
6 Jun	Aegon Championships; London, United Kingdom; ATP World Tour 250; Grass – €627,700 – 56S/24D; Singles – Doubles	(United Kingdom) Andy Murray; 3–6, 7–6^{(7–2)}, 6–4	(France) Jo-Wilfried Tsonga	(United Kingdom) James Ward (United States) Andy Roddick	(Spain) Rafael Nadal (France) Adrian Mannarino (Spain) Fernando Verdasco (Croatia) Marin Čilić
6 Jun	Aegon Championships; London, United Kingdom; ATP World Tour 250; Grass – €627,700 – 56S/24D; Singles – Doubles	(United States) Bob Bryan (United States) Mike Bryan; 6–7^{(2–7)}, 7–6^{(7–4)}, [10–6]	(India) Mahesh Bhupathi (India) Leander Paes	(United Kingdom) James Ward (United States) Andy Roddick	(Spain) Rafael Nadal (France) Adrian Mannarino (Spain) Fernando Verdasco (Croatia) Marin Čilić
13 Jun	UNICEF Open 's-Hertogenbosch, Netherlands; ATP World Tour 250; Grass – €398,250 – 32S/16D; Singles – Doubles	(Russia) Dmitry Tursunov; 6–3, 6–2	(Croatia) Ivan Dodig	(Belgium) Xavier Malisse (Cyprus) Marcos Baghdatis	(Colombia) Santiago Giraldo (United States) Alex Bogomolov Jr. (Russia) Teymuraz Gabashvili (Germany) Denis Gremelmayr
13 Jun	UNICEF Open 's-Hertogenbosch, Netherlands; ATP World Tour 250; Grass – €398,250 – 32S/16D; Singles – Doubles	(Italy) Daniele Bracciali (Czech Republic) František Čermák; 6–3, 2–6, [10–8]	(Sweden) Robert Lindstedt (Romania) Horia Tecău	(Belgium) Xavier Malisse (Cyprus) Marcos Baghdatis	(Colombia) Santiago Giraldo (United States) Alex Bogomolov Jr. (Russia) Teymuraz Gabashvili (Germany) Denis Gremelmayr
13 Jun	Aegon International; Eastbourne, United Kingdom; ATP World Tour 250; Grass – €405,000 – 32S/23Q/16D; Singles – Doubles	(Italy) Andreas Seppi; 7–6^{(7–5)}, 3–6, 5–3 retired^{[m]}	(Serbia) Janko Tipsarević	(Japan) Kei Nishikori (Russia) Igor Kunitsyn	(Czech Republic) Radek Štěpánek (Bulgaria) Grigor Dimitrov (France) Julien Benneteau (Belgium) Olivier Rochus
13 Jun	Aegon International; Eastbourne, United Kingdom; ATP World Tour 250; Grass – €405,000 – 32S/23Q/16D; Singles – Doubles	(Israel) Jonathan Erlich (Israel) Andy Ram; 6–3, 6–3^{[n]}	(Bulgaria) Grigor Dimitrov (Italy) Andreas Seppi	(Japan) Kei Nishikori (Russia) Igor Kunitsyn	(Czech Republic) Radek Štěpánek (Bulgaria) Grigor Dimitrov (France) Julien Benneteau (Belgium) Olivier Rochus
20 Jun; 27 Jun	The Championships, Wimbledon; London, United Kingdom; Grand Slam; Grass – £6,631,000; 128S/64D/48X; Singles – Doubles – Mixed doubles	(Serbia) Novak Djokovic; 6–4, 6–1, 1–6, 6–3	(Spain) Rafael Nadal	(United Kingdom) Andy Murray (France) Jo-Wilfried Tsonga	(United States) Mardy Fish (Spain) Feliciano López (Switzerland) Roger Federer (Australia) Bernard Tomic
20 Jun; 27 Jun	The Championships, Wimbledon; London, United Kingdom; Grand Slam; Grass – £6,631,000; 128S/64D/48X; Singles – Doubles – Mixed doubles	(United States) Bob Bryan (United States) Mike Bryan; 6–3, 6–4, 7–6^{(7–2)}	(Sweden) Robert Lindstedt (Romania) Horia Tecău	(United Kingdom) Andy Murray (France) Jo-Wilfried Tsonga	(United States) Mardy Fish (Spain) Feliciano López (Switzerland) Roger Federer (Australia) Bernard Tomic
20 Jun; 27 Jun	The Championships, Wimbledon; London, United Kingdom; Grand Slam; Grass – £6,631,000; 128S/64D/48X; Singles – Doubles – Mixed doubles	(Austria) Jürgen Melzer (Czech Republic) Iveta Benešová; 6–3, 6–2	(India) Mahesh Bhupathi (Russia) Elena Vesnina	(United Kingdom) Andy Murray (France) Jo-Wilfried Tsonga	(United States) Mardy Fish (Spain) Feliciano López (Switzerland) Roger Federer (Australia) Bernard Tomic

=== July ===
Week	Tournament	Champions	Runners-up	Semifinalists	Quarterfinalists
4 Jul	Campbell's Hall of Fame; Tennis Championships; Newport, Rhode Island, United States; ATP World Tour 250; Grass – $442,500 – 32S/16D; Singles – Doubles	(United States) John Isner; 6–3, 7–6^{(8–6)}	(Belgium) Olivier Rochus	(Germany) Tobias Kamke (United States) Michael Yani	(United States) Alex Bogomolov Jr. (France) Édouard Roger-Vasselin (Australia) Matthew Ebden (United States) Denis Kudla
4 Jul	Campbell's Hall of Fame; Tennis Championships; Newport, Rhode Island, United States; ATP World Tour 250; Grass – $442,500 – 32S/16D; Singles – Doubles	(Australia) Matthew Ebden (United States) Ryan Harrison; 4–6, 6–3, [10–5]	(Sweden) Johan Brunström (Canada) Adil Shamasdin	(Germany) Tobias Kamke (United States) Michael Yani	(United States) Alex Bogomolov Jr. (France) Édouard Roger-Vasselin (Australia) Matthew Ebden (United States) Denis Kudla
4 Jul	Davis Cup by BNP Paribas Quarterfinals; Halmstad, Sweden – hard (i); Buenos Aires, Argentina – clay Austin, United States – hard (i); Stuttgart, Germany – clay	Quarterfinals winners Serbia 4–1; Argentina 5–0; Spain 3–1; France 4–1	Quarterfinals losers Sweden; Kazakhstan; United States; Germany		
11 Jul	MercedesCup; Stuttgart, Germany; ATP World Tour 250; Clay – €398,250 – 32S/16D; Singles – Doubles	(Spain) Juan Carlos Ferrero; 6–4, 6–0	(Spain) Pablo Andújar	(Argentina) Federico Delbonis (Poland) Łukasz Kubot	(Slovakia) Pavol Červenák (Spain) Marcel Granollers (Germany) Cedrik-Marcel Stebe (Colombia) Santiago Giraldo
11 Jul	MercedesCup; Stuttgart, Germany; ATP World Tour 250; Clay – €398,250 – 32S/16D; Singles – Doubles	(Austria) Jürgen Melzer (Germany) Philipp Petzschner; 6–3, 6–4	(Spain) Marcel Granollers (Spain) Marc López	(Argentina) Federico Delbonis (Poland) Łukasz Kubot	(Slovakia) Pavol Červenák (Spain) Marcel Granollers (Germany) Cedrik-Marcel Stebe (Colombia) Santiago Giraldo
11 Jul	Collector Swedish Open; Båstad, Sweden; ATP World Tour 250; Clay – €398,250 – 28S/16D; Singles – Doubles	(Sweden) Robin Söderling; 6–2, 6–2	(Spain) David Ferrer	(Czech Republic) Tomáš Berdych (Spain) Nicolás Almagro	(Italy) Potito Starace (Slovenia) Blaž Kavčič (Sweden) Michael Ryderstedt (Austria) Andreas Haider-Maurer
11 Jul	Collector Swedish Open; Båstad, Sweden; ATP World Tour 250; Clay – €398,250 – 28S/16D; Singles – Doubles	(Sweden) Robert Lindstedt (Romania) Horia Tecău; 6–3, 6–3	(Sweden) Simon Aspelin (Sweden) Andreas Siljeström	(Czech Republic) Tomáš Berdych (Spain) Nicolás Almagro	(Italy) Potito Starace (Slovenia) Blaž Kavčič (Sweden) Michael Ryderstedt (Austria) Andreas Haider-Maurer
18 Jul	bet–at–home Open; German Tennis Championships; Hamburg, Germany; ATP World Tour 500; Clay – €1,000,000 – 48S/16D; Singles – Doubles	(France) Gilles Simon; 6–4, 4–6, 6–4	(Spain) Nicolás Almagro	(Russia) Mikhail Youzhny (Spain) Fernando Verdasco	(France) Gaël Monfils (Croatia) Marin Čilić (Germany) Florian Mayer (Austria) Jürgen Melzer
18 Jul	bet–at–home Open; German Tennis Championships; Hamburg, Germany; ATP World Tour 500; Clay – €1,000,000 – 48S/16D; Singles – Doubles	(Austria) Oliver Marach (Austria) Alexander Peya; 6–4, 6–1	(Czech Republic) František Čermák (Slovakia) Filip Polášek	(Russia) Mikhail Youzhny (Spain) Fernando Verdasco	(France) Gaël Monfils (Croatia) Marin Čilić (Germany) Florian Mayer (Austria) Jürgen Melzer
18 Jul	Atlanta Tennis Championships; Atlanta, United States; ATP World Tour 250; Hard – $531,000 – 28S/16D; Singles – Doubles	(United States) Mardy Fish; 3–6, 7–6^{(8–6)}, 6–2	(United States) John Isner	(United States) Ryan Harrison (Luxembourg) Gilles Müller	(India) Somdev Devvarman (United States) Rajeev Ram (Chinese Taipei) Lu Yen-hsun (South Africa) Kevin Anderson
18 Jul	Atlanta Tennis Championships; Atlanta, United States; ATP World Tour 250; Hard – $531,000 – 28S/16D; Singles – Doubles	(United States) Alex Bogomolov Jr. (Australia) Matthew Ebden; 3–6, 7–5, [10–8]	(Germany) Matthias Bachinger (Germany) Frank Moser	(United States) Ryan Harrison (Luxembourg) Gilles Müller	(India) Somdev Devvarman (United States) Rajeev Ram (Chinese Taipei) Lu Yen-hsun (South Africa) Kevin Anderson
25 Jul	Crédit Agricole Suisse Open Gstaad; Gstaad, Switzerland; ATP World Tour 250; Clay – €398,250 – 28S/16D; Singles – Doubles	(Spain) Marcel Granollers; 6–4, 3–6, 6–3	(Spain) Fernando Verdasco	(Spain) Nicolás Almagro (Russia) Mikhail Youzhny	(Spain) Feliciano López (France) Julien Benneteau (Austria) Andreas Haider-Maurer (Switzerland) Stanislas Wawrinka
25 Jul	Crédit Agricole Suisse Open Gstaad; Gstaad, Switzerland; ATP World Tour 250; Clay – €398,250 – 28S/16D; Singles – Doubles	(Czech Republic) František Čermák (Slovakia) Filip Polášek; 6–3, 7–6^{(9–7)}	(Germany) Christopher Kas (Austria) Alexander Peya	(Spain) Nicolás Almagro (Russia) Mikhail Youzhny	(Spain) Feliciano López (France) Julien Benneteau (Austria) Andreas Haider-Maurer (Switzerland) Stanislas Wawrinka
25 Jul	Farmers Classic; Los Angeles, United States; ATP World Tour 250; Hard – $619,500 – 28S/16D; Singles – Doubles	(Latvia) Ernests Gulbis; 5–7, 6–4, 6–4	(United States) Mardy Fish	(United States) Ryan Harrison (United States) Alex Bogomolov Jr.	(Russia) Igor Kunitsyn (Chinese Taipei) Lu Yen-hsun (Brazil) Thomaz Bellucci (Argentina) Juan Martín del Potro
25 Jul	Farmers Classic; Los Angeles, United States; ATP World Tour 250; Hard – $619,500 – 28S/16D; Singles – Doubles	(The Bahamas) Mark Knowles (Belgium) Xavier Malisse; 7–6^{(7–3)}, 7–6^{(12–10)}	(India) Somdev Devvarman (Philippines) Treat Conrad Huey	(United States) Ryan Harrison (United States) Alex Bogomolov Jr.	(Russia) Igor Kunitsyn (Chinese Taipei) Lu Yen-hsun (Brazil) Thomaz Bellucci (Argentina) Juan Martín del Potro
25 Jul	Studena Croatia Open; Umag, Croatia; ATP World Tour 250; Clay – €398,250 – 28S/16D; Singles – Doubles	(Ukraine) Alexandr Dolgopolov; 6–4, 3–6, 6–3	(Croatia) Marin Čilić	(Italy) Fabio Fognini (Spain) Juan Carlos Ferrero	(Italy) Potito Starace (Italy) Andreas Seppi (Argentina) Carlos Berlocq (Spain) Albert Ramos
25 Jul	Studena Croatia Open; Umag, Croatia; ATP World Tour 250; Clay – €398,250 – 28S/16D; Singles – Doubles	(Italy) Simone Bolelli (Italy) Fabio Fognini; 6–3, 5–7, [10–7]	(Croatia) Marin Čilić (Croatia) Lovro Zovko	(Italy) Fabio Fognini (Spain) Juan Carlos Ferrero	(Italy) Potito Starace (Italy) Andreas Seppi (Argentina) Carlos Berlocq (Spain) Albert Ramos

=== August ===
Week	Tournament	Champions	Runners-up	Semifinalists	Quarterfinalists
1 Aug	Legg Mason Tennis Classic; Washington, D.C., United States; ATP World Tour 500; Hard – $1,165,500 – 48S/16D; Singles – Doubles	(Czech Republic) Radek Štěpánek; 6–4, 6–4	(France) Gaël Monfils	(United States) John Isner (United States) Donald Young	(Serbia) Janko Tipsarević (Serbia) Viktor Troicki (Cyprus) Marcos Baghdatis (Spain) Fernando Verdasco
1 Aug	Legg Mason Tennis Classic; Washington, D.C., United States; ATP World Tour 500; Hard – $1,165,500 – 48S/16D; Singles – Doubles	(France) Michaël Llodra (Serbia) Nenad Zimonjić; 6–7^{(3–7)}, 7–6^{(8–6)}, [10–7]	(Sweden) Robert Lindstedt (Romania) Horia Tecău	(United States) John Isner (United States) Donald Young	(Serbia) Janko Tipsarević (Serbia) Viktor Troicki (Cyprus) Marcos Baghdatis (Spain) Fernando Verdasco
1 Aug	Bet-at-home.com Cup; Kitzbühel, Austria; ATP World Tour 250; Clay – €450,000 – 28S/16D; Singles – Doubles	(Netherlands) Robin Haase; 6–4, 4–6, 6–1	(Spain) Albert Montañés	(Argentina) Juan Ignacio Chela (Brazil) João Souza	(Spain) Marcel Granollers (Colombia) Santiago Giraldo (Spain) Pablo Andújar (Italy) Andreas Seppi
1 Aug	Bet-at-home.com Cup; Kitzbühel, Austria; ATP World Tour 250; Clay – €450,000 – 28S/16D; Singles – Doubles	(Italy) Daniele Bracciali (Mexico) Santiago González; 7–6^{(7–1)}, 4–6, [11–9]	(Brazil) Franco Ferreiro (Brazil) André Sá	(Argentina) Juan Ignacio Chela (Brazil) João Souza	(Spain) Marcel Granollers (Colombia) Santiago Giraldo (Spain) Pablo Andújar (Italy) Andreas Seppi
8 Aug	Rogers Cup; Montreal, Canada; ATP World Tour Masters 1000; Hard – $2,430,000 – 56S/24D; Singles – Doubles	(Serbia) Novak Djokovic; 6–2, 3–6, 6–4	(United States) Mardy Fish	(France) Jo-Wilfried Tsonga (Serbia) Janko Tipsarević	(France) Gaël Monfils (Spain) Nicolás Almagro (Switzerland) Stanislas Wawrinka (Czech Republic) Tomáš Berdych
8 Aug	Rogers Cup; Montreal, Canada; ATP World Tour Masters 1000; Hard – $2,430,000 – 56S/24D; Singles – Doubles	(France) Michaël Llodra (Serbia) Nenad Zimonjić; 6–4, 6–7^{(5–7)}, [10–5]	(United States) Bob Bryan (United States) Mike Bryan	(France) Jo-Wilfried Tsonga (Serbia) Janko Tipsarević	(France) Gaël Monfils (Spain) Nicolás Almagro (Switzerland) Stanislas Wawrinka (Czech Republic) Tomáš Berdych
15 Aug	Western & Southern Open; Mason, United States; ATP World Tour Masters 1000; Hard – $2,430,000 – 56S/24D; Singles – Doubles	(United Kingdom) Andy Murray; 6–4, 3–0 retired	(Serbia) Novak Djokovic	(Czech Republic) Tomáš Berdych (United States) Mardy Fish	(France) Gaël Monfils (Switzerland) Roger Federer (France) Gilles Simon (Spain) Rafael Nadal
15 Aug	Western & Southern Open; Mason, United States; ATP World Tour Masters 1000; Hard – $2,430,000 – 56S/24D; Singles – Doubles	(India) Mahesh Bhupathi (India) Leander Paes; 7–6^{(7–4)}, 7–6^{(7–2)}	(France) Michaël Llodra (Serbia) Nenad Zimonjić	(Czech Republic) Tomáš Berdych (United States) Mardy Fish	(France) Gaël Monfils (Switzerland) Roger Federer (France) Gilles Simon (Spain) Rafael Nadal
22 Aug	Winston-Salem Open; Winston-Salem, United States; ATP World Tour 250; Hard – $553,125 – 48S/16D; Singles – Doubles	(United States) John Isner; 4–6, 6–3, 6–4	(France) Julien Benneteau	(United States) Andy Roddick (Netherlands) Robin Haase	(Argentina) Juan Mónaco (Cyprus) Marcos Baghdatis (Ukraine) Alexandr Dolgopolov (Ukraine) Sergiy Stakhovsky
22 Aug	Winston-Salem Open; Winston-Salem, United States; ATP World Tour 250; Hard – $553,125 – 48S/16D; Singles – Doubles	(Israel) Jonathan Erlich (Israel) Andy Ram; 7–6^{(7–2)}, 6–4	(Germany) Christopher Kas (Austria) Alexander Peya	(United States) Andy Roddick (Netherlands) Robin Haase	(Argentina) Juan Mónaco (Cyprus) Marcos Baghdatis (Ukraine) Alexandr Dolgopolov (Ukraine) Sergiy Stakhovsky
29 Aug; 5 Sep	US Open; New York City, United States; Grand Slam; Hard – $10,508,000; 128S/164D/32X; Singles – Doubles – Mixed doubles	(Serbia) Novak Djokovic; 6–2, 6–4, 6–7^{(3–7)}, 6–1	(Spain) Rafael Nadal	(Switzerland) Roger Federer (United Kingdom) Andy Murray	(Serbia) Janko Tipsarević (France) Jo-Wilfried Tsonga (United States) John Isner (United States) Andy Roddick
29 Aug; 5 Sep	US Open; New York City, United States; Grand Slam; Hard – $10,508,000; 128S/164D/32X; Singles – Doubles – Mixed doubles	(Austria) Jürgen Melzer (Germany) Philipp Petzschner; 6–2, 6–2	(Poland) Mariusz Fyrstenberg (Poland) Marcin Matkowski	(Switzerland) Roger Federer (United Kingdom) Andy Murray	(Serbia) Janko Tipsarević (France) Jo-Wilfried Tsonga (United States) John Isner (United States) Andy Roddick
29 Aug; 5 Sep	US Open; New York City, United States; Grand Slam; Hard – $10,508,000; 128S/164D/32X; Singles – Doubles – Mixed doubles	(United States) Jack Sock (United States) Melanie Oudin; 7–6^{(7–4)}, 4–6, [10–8]	(Argentina) Eduardo Schwank (Argentina) Gisela Dulko	(Switzerland) Roger Federer (United Kingdom) Andy Murray	(Serbia) Janko Tipsarević (France) Jo-Wilfried Tsonga (United States) John Isner (United States) Andy Roddick

=== September ===
Week	Tournament	Champions	Runners-up	Semifinalists	Quarterfinalists
12 Sep	Davis Cup by BNP Paribas Semifinals; Belgrade, Serbia – hard (i); Córdoba, Spain – clay	Semifinals winners Argentina 3–2; Spain 4–1	Semifinals losers Serbia; France		
19 Sep	BRD Năstase Țiriac Trophy; Bucharest, Romania; ATP World Tour 250; Clay – €422,950 – 28S/16D; Singles – Doubles	(Germany) Florian Mayer; 6–3, 6–1	(Spain) Pablo Andújar	(Argentina) Juan Ignacio Chela (Italy) Filippo Volandri	(Italy) Andreas Seppi (Italy) Alessandro Giannessi (Brazil) João Souza (Spain) Albert Ramos
19 Sep	BRD Năstase Țiriac Trophy; Bucharest, Romania; ATP World Tour 250; Clay – €422,950 – 28S/16D; Singles – Doubles	(Italy) Daniele Bracciali (Italy) Potito Starace; 3–6, 6–4, [10–8]	(Austria) Julian Knowle (Spain) David Marrero	(Argentina) Juan Ignacio Chela (Italy) Filippo Volandri	(Italy) Andreas Seppi (Italy) Alessandro Giannessi (Brazil) João Souza (Spain) Albert Ramos
19 Sep	Open de Moselle; Metz, France; ATP World Tour 250; Hard (i) – €398,250 – 28S/16D; Singles – Doubles	(France) Jo-Wilfried Tsonga; 6–3, 6–7^{(4–7)}, 6–3	(Croatia) Ivan Ljubičić	(Ukraine) Alexandr Dolgopolov (Luxembourg) Gilles Müller	(France) Nicolas Mahut (Belgium) Xavier Malisse (Netherlands) Igor Sijsling (France) Richard Gasquet
19 Sep	Open de Moselle; Metz, France; ATP World Tour 250; Hard (i) – €398,250 – 28S/16D; Singles – Doubles	(United Kingdom) Jamie Murray (Brazil) André Sá; 6–4, 7–6^{(9–7)}	(Czech Republic) Lukáš Dlouhý (Brazil) Marcelo Melo	(Ukraine) Alexandr Dolgopolov (Luxembourg) Gilles Müller	(France) Nicolas Mahut (Belgium) Xavier Malisse (Netherlands) Igor Sijsling (France) Richard Gasquet
26 Sep	Malaysian Open; Kuala Lumpur, Malaysia; ATP World Tour 250; Hard (i) – $850,000 – 28S/16D; Singles – Doubles	(Serbia) Janko Tipsarević; 6–4, 7–5	(Cyprus) Marcos Baghdatis	(Japan) Kei Nishikori (Serbia) Viktor Troicki	(Spain) Nicolás Almagro (Russia) Nikolay Davydenko (Austria) Jürgen Melzer (Russia) Dmitry Tursunov
26 Sep	Malaysian Open; Kuala Lumpur, Malaysia; ATP World Tour 250; Hard (i) – $850,000 – 28S/16D; Singles – Doubles	(United States) Eric Butorac (Curaçao) Jean-Julien Rojer; 6–1, 6–3	(Czech Republic) František Čermák (Slovakia) Filip Polášek	(Japan) Kei Nishikori (Serbia) Viktor Troicki	(Spain) Nicolás Almagro (Russia) Nikolay Davydenko (Austria) Jürgen Melzer (Russia) Dmitry Tursunov
26 Sep	PTT Thailand Open; Bangkok, Thailand; ATP World Tour 250; Hard (i) – $608,500 – 28S/16D; Singles – Doubles	(United Kingdom) Andy Murray; 6–2, 6–0	(United States) Donald Young	(France) Gilles Simon (France) Gaël Monfils	(Bulgaria) Grigor Dimitrov (Germany) Matthias Bachinger (Japan) Go Soeda (Finland) Jarkko Nieminen
26 Sep	PTT Thailand Open; Bangkok, Thailand; ATP World Tour 250; Hard (i) – $608,500 – 28S/16D; Singles – Doubles	(Austria) Oliver Marach (Pakistan) Aisam-ul-Haq Qureshi; 7–6^{(7–4)}, 7–6^{(7–5)}	(Germany) Michael Kohlmann (Germany) Alexander Waske	(France) Gilles Simon (France) Gaël Monfils	(Bulgaria) Grigor Dimitrov (Germany) Matthias Bachinger (Japan) Go Soeda (Finland) Jarkko Nieminen

=== October ===
Week	Tournament	Champions	Runners-up	Semifinalists	Quarterfinalists
3 Oct	China Open; Beijing, China; ATP World Tour 500; Hard – $2,100,000 – 32S/16D; Singles – Doubles	(Czech Republic) Tomáš Berdych; 3–6, 6–4, 6–1	(Croatia) Marin Čilić	(France) Jo-Wilfried Tsonga (Croatia) Ivan Ljubičić	(Spain) Juan Carlos Ferrero (Spain) Fernando Verdasco (Russia) Mikhail Youzhny (South Africa) Kevin Anderson
3 Oct	China Open; Beijing, China; ATP World Tour 500; Hard – $2,100,000 – 32S/16D; Singles – Doubles	(France) Michaël Llodra (Serbia) Nenad Zimonjić; 7–6^{(7–2)}, 7–6^{(7–4)}	(Sweden) Robert Lindstedt (Romania) Horia Tecău	(France) Jo-Wilfried Tsonga (Croatia) Ivan Ljubičić	(Spain) Juan Carlos Ferrero (Spain) Fernando Verdasco (Russia) Mikhail Youzhny (South Africa) Kevin Anderson
3 Oct	Rakuten Japan Open Tennis Championships; Tokyo, Japan; ATP World Tour 500; Hard – $1,100,000 – 32S/16D; Singles – Doubles	(United Kingdom) Andy Murray; 3–6, 6–2, 6–0	(Spain) Rafael Nadal	(United States) Mardy Fish (Spain) David Ferrer	(Colombia) Santiago Giraldo (Australia) Bernard Tomic (Czech Republic) Radek Štěpánek (Argentina) David Nalbandian
3 Oct	Rakuten Japan Open Tennis Championships; Tokyo, Japan; ATP World Tour 500; Hard – $1,100,000 – 32S/16D; Singles – Doubles	(United Kingdom) Andy Murray (United Kingdom) Jamie Murray; 6–1, 6–4	(Czech Republic) František Čermák (Slovakia) Filip Polášek	(United States) Mardy Fish (Spain) David Ferrer	(Colombia) Santiago Giraldo (Australia) Bernard Tomic (Czech Republic) Radek Štěpánek (Argentina) David Nalbandian
10 Oct	Shanghai Rolex Masters; Shanghai, China; ATP World Tour Masters 1000; Hard – $3,240,000 – 56S/24D; Singles – Doubles	(United Kingdom) Andy Murray; 7–5, 6–4	(Spain) David Ferrer	(Spain) Feliciano López (Japan) Kei Nishikori	(Germany) Florian Mayer (United States) Andy Roddick (Ukraine) Alexandr Dolgopolov (Australia) Matthew Ebden
10 Oct	Shanghai Rolex Masters; Shanghai, China; ATP World Tour Masters 1000; Hard – $3,240,000 – 56S/24D; Singles – Doubles	(Belarus) Max Mirnyi (Canada) Daniel Nestor; 3–6, 6–1, [12–10]	(France) Michaël Llodra (Serbia) Nenad Zimonjić	(Spain) Feliciano López (Japan) Kei Nishikori	(Germany) Florian Mayer (United States) Andy Roddick (Ukraine) Alexandr Dolgopolov (Australia) Matthew Ebden
17 Oct	Kremlin Cup; Moscow, Russia; ATP World Tour 250; Hard (i) – $1,000,000 – 28S/16D; Singles – Doubles	(Serbia) Janko Tipsarević; 6–4, 6–2	(Serbia) Viktor Troicki	(Russia) Nikolay Davydenko (France) Jérémy Chardy	(Russia) Dmitry Tursunov (Germany) Michael Berrer (Germany) Philipp Kohlschreiber (United States) Alex Bogomolov Jr.
17 Oct	Kremlin Cup; Moscow, Russia; ATP World Tour 250; Hard (i) – $1,000,000 – 28S/16D; Singles – Doubles	(Czech Republic) František Čermák (Slovakia) Filip Polášek; 6–3, 6–1	(Argentina) Carlos Berlocq (Spain) David Marrero	(Russia) Nikolay Davydenko (France) Jérémy Chardy	(Russia) Dmitry Tursunov (Germany) Michael Berrer (Germany) Philipp Kohlschreiber (United States) Alex Bogomolov Jr.
17 Oct	If Stockholm Open; Stockholm, Sweden; ATP World Tour 250; Hard (i) – €531,000 – 28S/16D; Singles – Doubles	(France) Gaël Monfils; 7–5, 3–6, 6–2	(Finland) Jarkko Nieminen	(Canada) Milos Raonic (United States) James Blake	(South Africa) Kevin Anderson (Bulgaria) Grigor Dimitrov (Germany) Tobias Kamke (Argentina) David Nalbandian
17 Oct	If Stockholm Open; Stockholm, Sweden; ATP World Tour 250; Hard (i) – €531,000 – 28S/16D; Singles – Doubles	(India) Rohan Bopanna (Pakistan) Aisam-ul-Haq Qureshi; 6–1, 6–3	(Brazil) Marcelo Melo (Brazil) Bruno Soares	(Canada) Milos Raonic (United States) James Blake	(South Africa) Kevin Anderson (Bulgaria) Grigor Dimitrov (Germany) Tobias Kamke (Argentina) David Nalbandian
24 Oct	St. Petersburg Open; Saint Petersburg, Russia; ATP World Tour 250; Hard (i) – $663,750 – 32S/16D; Singles – Doubles	(Croatia) Marin Čilić; 6–3, 3–6, 6–2	(Serbia) Janko Tipsarević	(Russia) Mikhail Youzhny (United States) Alex Bogomolov Jr.	(France) Adrian Mannarino (Italy) Andreas Seppi (Serbia) Dušan Lajović (Italy) Potito Starace
24 Oct	St. Petersburg Open; Saint Petersburg, Russia; ATP World Tour 250; Hard (i) – $663,750 – 32S/16D; Singles – Doubles	(United Kingdom) Colin Fleming (United Kingdom) Ross Hutchins; 6–3, 6–7^{(5–7)}, [10–8]	(Russia) Mikhail Elgin (Russia) Alexander Kudryavtsev	(Russia) Mikhail Youzhny (United States) Alex Bogomolov Jr.	(France) Adrian Mannarino (Italy) Andreas Seppi (Serbia) Dušan Lajović (Italy) Potito Starace
24 Oct	Erste Bank Open; Vienna, Austria; ATP World Tour 250; Hard (i) – €575,250 – 28S/16D; Singles – Doubles	(France) Jo-Wilfried Tsonga; 6–7^{(5–7)}, 6–3, 6–4	(Argentina) Juan Martín del Potro	(Germany) Daniel Brands (South Africa) Kevin Anderson	(Belgium) Xavier Malisse (Belgium) Steve Darcis (Austria) Jürgen Melzer (Germany) Tommy Haas
24 Oct	Erste Bank Open; Vienna, Austria; ATP World Tour 250; Hard (i) – €575,250 – 28S/16D; Singles – Doubles	(United States) Bob Bryan (United States) Mike Bryan; 7–6^{(12–10)}, 6–3	(Belarus) Max Mirnyi (Canada) Daniel Nestor	(Germany) Daniel Brands (South Africa) Kevin Anderson	(Belgium) Xavier Malisse (Belgium) Steve Darcis (Austria) Jürgen Melzer (Germany) Tommy Haas
31 Oct	Valencia Open 500; Valencia, Spain; ATP World Tour 500; Hard (i) – €1,357,000 – 32S/16D; Singles – Doubles	(Spain) Marcel Granollers; 6–2, 4–6, 7–6^{(7–3)}	(Argentina) Juan Mónaco	(Spain) David Ferrer (Argentina) Juan Martín del Potro	(Russia) Nikolay Davydenko (Spain) Juan Carlos Ferrero (France) Gaël Monfils (United States) Sam Querrey
31 Oct	Valencia Open 500; Valencia, Spain; ATP World Tour 500; Hard (i) – €1,357,000 – 32S/16D; Singles – Doubles	(United States) Bob Bryan (United States) Mike Bryan; 6–4, 7–6^{(11–9)}	(United States) Eric Butorac (Curaçao) Jean-Julien Rojer	(Spain) David Ferrer (Argentina) Juan Martín del Potro	(Russia) Nikolay Davydenko (Spain) Juan Carlos Ferrero (France) Gaël Monfils (United States) Sam Querrey
31 Oct	Swiss Indoors Basel; Basel, Switzerland; ATP World Tour 500; Hard (i) – €1,225,000 – 32S/16D; Singles – Doubles	(Switzerland) Roger Federer; 6–1, 6–3	(Japan) Kei Nishikori	(Serbia) Novak Djokovic (Switzerland) Stanislas Wawrinka	(Cyprus) Marcos Baghdatis (Kazakhstan) Mikhail Kukushkin (United States) Andy Roddick (Germany) Florian Mayer
31 Oct	Swiss Indoors Basel; Basel, Switzerland; ATP World Tour 500; Hard (i) – €1,225,000 – 32S/16D; Singles – Doubles	(France) Michaël Llodra (Serbia) Nenad Zimonjić; 6–4, 7–5	(Belarus) Max Mirnyi (Canada) Daniel Nestor	(Serbia) Novak Djokovic (Switzerland) Stanislas Wawrinka	(Cyprus) Marcos Baghdatis (Kazakhstan) Mikhail Kukushkin (United States) Andy Roddick (Germany) Florian Mayer

=== November ===
Week	Tournament	Champions	Runners-up	Semifinalists	Quarterfinalists
7 Nov	BNP Paribas Masters; Paris, France; ATP World Tour Masters 1000; Hard (i) – €2,227,500 – 48S/24D; Singles – Doubles	(Switzerland) Roger Federer; 6–1, 7–6^{(7–3)}	(France) Jo-Wilfried Tsonga	(United States) John Isner (Czech Republic) Tomáš Berdych	(Serbia) Novak Djokovic (Spain) David Ferrer (Argentina) Juan Mónaco (United Kingdom) Andy Murray
7 Nov	BNP Paribas Masters; Paris, France; ATP World Tour Masters 1000; Hard (i) – €2,227,500 – 48S/24D; Singles – Doubles	(India) Rohan Bopanna (Pakistan) Aisam-ul-Haq Qureshi; 6–2, 6–4	(France) Julien Benneteau (France) Nicolas Mahut	(United States) John Isner (Czech Republic) Tomáš Berdych	(Serbia) Novak Djokovic (Spain) David Ferrer (Argentina) Juan Mónaco (United Kingdom) Andy Murray
21 Nov	Barclays ATP World Tour Finals; London, United Kingdom; ATP World Tour Finals; Hard (i) – £2,227,500 – 8S/8D (RR); Singles – Doubles	(Switzerland) Roger Federer; 6–3, 6–7^{(6–8)}, 6–3	(France) Jo-Wilfried Tsonga	(Czech Republic) Tomáš Berdych (Spain) David Ferrer	Round Robin losers (Serbia) Novak Djokovic (Serbia) Janko Tipsarević (United Kingdom) Andy Murray (Spain) Rafael Nadal (United States) Mardy Fish
21 Nov	Barclays ATP World Tour Finals; London, United Kingdom; ATP World Tour Finals; Hard (i) – £2,227,500 – 8S/8D (RR); Singles – Doubles	(Belarus) Max Mirnyi (Canada) Daniel Nestor; 7–5, 6–3	(Poland) Mariusz Fyrstenberg (Poland) Marcin Matkowski	(Czech Republic) Tomáš Berdych (Spain) David Ferrer	Round Robin losers (Serbia) Novak Djokovic (Serbia) Janko Tipsarević (United Kingdom) Andy Murray (Spain) Rafael Nadal (United States) Mardy Fish
28 Nov	Davis Cup by BNP Paribas Final; Seville, Spain – clay	Spain; 3–1	Argentina		

== Statistical information ==
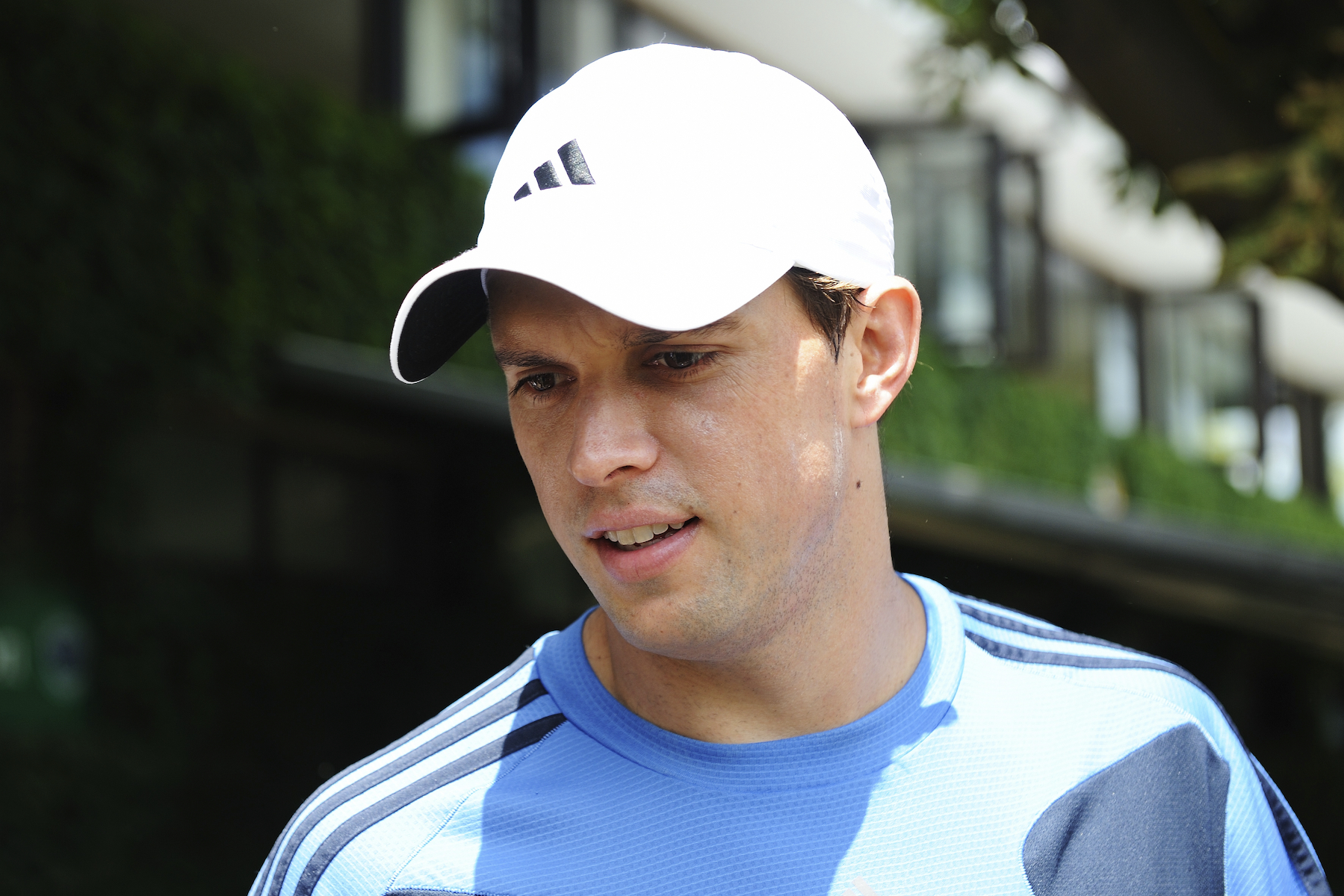
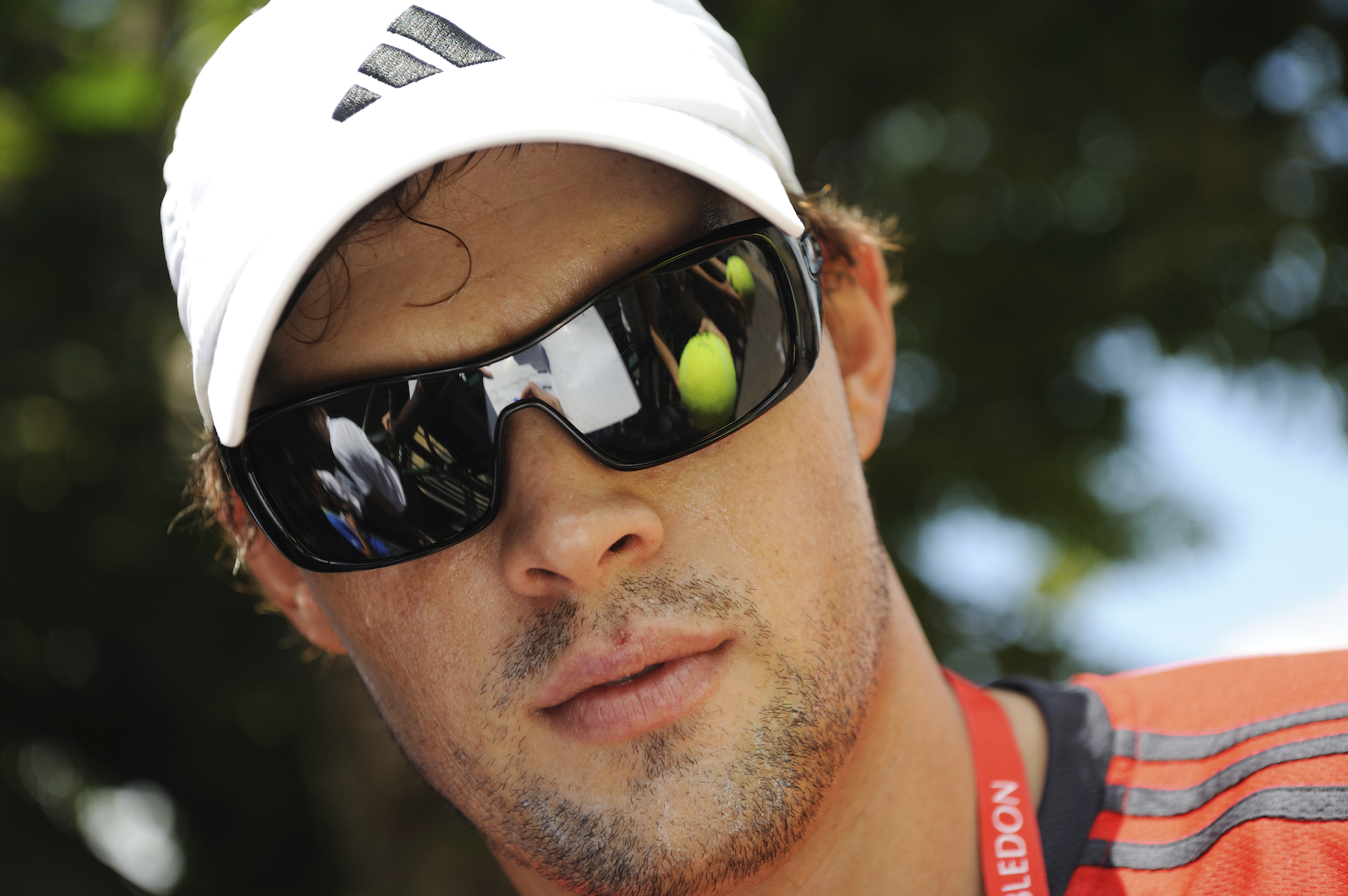
Doubles World No. 1s Bob (left) and Mike Bryan (right) won their tenth and eleventh Grand Slam titles together at the Australian Open (def. Bhupathi/Paes) and at the Wimbledon Championships (def. Lindstedt/Tecău), tying the record of team titles in majors set by Australians Todd Woodbridge and Mark Woodforde in 2000.

These tables present the number of singles (S), doubles (D), and mixed doubles (X) titles won by each player and each nation during the season, within all the tournament categories of the 2011 ATP World Tour: the Grand Slam tournaments, the ATP World Tour Finals, the ATP World Tour Masters 1000, the ATP World Tour 500 series, and the ATP World Tour 250 series. The players/nations are sorted by: 1) total number of titles (a doubles title won by two players representing the same nation counts as only one win for the nation); 2) cumulated importance of those titles (one Grand Slam win equalling two Masters 1000 wins, one ATP World Tour Finals win equalling one-and-a-half Masters 1000 win, one Masters 1000 win equalling two 500 events wins, one 500 event win equalling two 250 events wins); 3) a singles > doubles > mixed doubles hierarchy; 4) alphabetical order (by family names for players).

To avoid confusion and double counting, these tables should be updated only after an event is completed. The tables are through to the tournaments completed in the week of 31 October.

Key

Grand Slam
ATP World Tour Finals
ATP World Tour Masters 1000
ATP World Tour 500
ATP World Tour 250
All titles

=== Titles won by player ===
Total	Player	Grand Slam			ATP Finals		Masters 1000		Tour 500		Tour 250		Total		
Total	Player	S	D	X	S	D	S	D	S	D	S	D	S	D	X
10	Novak Djokovic (SRB)	● ● ●					● ● ● ● ●		●		●		10	0	0
8	Bob Bryan (USA)		● ●					● ●		●		● ● ●	0	8	0
8	Mike Bryan (USA)		● ●					● ●		●		● ● ●	0	8	0
6	Andy Murray (GBR)						● ●		●	●	● ●		5	1	0
5	Daniel Nestor (CAN)		●	●		●		●		●			0	4	1
4	Jürgen Melzer (AUT)		●	●						●		●	0	3	1
4	Rafael Nadal (ESP)	●					●		●			●	3	1	0
4	Max Mirnyi (BLR)		●			●		●		●			0	4	0
4	Scott Lipsky (USA)			●						●		● ●	0	3	1
4	Roger Federer (SUI)				●		●		●		●		4	0	0
4	Michaël Llodra (FRA)							●		● ● ●			0	4	0
4	Nenad Zimonjić (SRB)							●		● ● ●			0	4	0
4	Aisam-ul-Haq Qureshi (PAK)							●				● ● ●	0	4	0
4	Robin Söderling (SWE)								●		● ● ●		4	0	0
4	Horia Tecău (ROU)									●		● ● ●	0	4	0
4	František Čermák (CZE)											● ● ● ●	0	4	0
3	Philipp Petzschner (GER)		●							●		●	0	3	0
3	Mahesh Bhupathi (IND)							● ●				●	0	3	0
3	Leander Paes (IND)							● ●				●	0	3	0
3	John Isner (USA)							●			● ●		2	1	0
3	Rohan Bopanna (IND)							●				● ●	0	3	0
3	Marcel Granollers (ESP)								●		●	●	2	1	0
3	Oliver Marach (AUT)									●		● ●	0	3	0
3	Nicolás Almagro (ESP)										● ● ●		3	0	0
3	Daniele Bracciali (ITA)											● ● ●	0	3	0
3	Eric Butorac (USA)											● ● ●	0	3	0
3	Filip Polášek (SVK)											● ● ●	0	4	0
3	Jean-Julien Rojer (CUR)											● ● ●	0	3	0
2	Alexandr Dolgopolov (UKR)							●			●		1	1	0
2	Xavier Malisse (BEL)							●				●	0	2	0
2	David Ferrer (ESP)								●		●		2	0	0
2	Gilles Simon (FRA)								●		●		2	0	0
2	Santiago González (MEX)									●		●	0	2	0
2	Jamie Murray (GBR)									●		●	0	2	0
2	Juan Martín del Potro (ARG)										● ●		2	0	0
2	Janko Tipsarević (SRB)										● ●		2	0	0
2	Jo-Wilfried Tsonga (FRA)										● ●		2	0	0
2	Robin Haase (NED)										●	●	1	1	0
2	Tommy Robredo (ESP)										●	●	1	1	0
2	Simone Bolelli (ITA)											● ●	0	2	0
2	Lukáš Dlouhý (CZE)											● ●	0	2	0
2	Matthew Ebden (AUS)											● ●	0	2	0
2	Jonathan Erlich (ISR)											● ●	0	2	0
2	Paul Hanley (AUS)											● ●	0	2	0
2	Robert Lindstedt (SWE)											● ●	0	2	0
2	Marcelo Melo (BRA)											● ●	0	2	0
2	Andy Ram (ISR)											● ●	0	2	0
2	Rajeev Ram (USA)											● ●	0	2	0
2	Bruno Soares (BRA)											● ●	0	2	0
1	Jack Sock (USA)			●									0	0	1
1	Sam Querrey (USA)							●					0	1	0
1	Tomáš Berdych (CZE)								●				1	0	0
1	Andy Roddick (USA)								●				1	0	0
1	Radek Štěpánek (CZE)								●				1	0	0
1	Victor Hănescu (ROU)									●			0	1	0
1	Alexander Peya (AUT)									●			0	1	0
1	Sergiy Stakhovsky (UKR)									●			0	1	0
1	Mikhail Youzhny (RUS)									●			0	1	0
1	Kevin Anderson (RSA)										●		1	0	0
1	Pablo Andújar (ESP)										●		1	0	0
1	Marin Čilić (CRO)										●		1	0	0
1	Nikolay Davydenko (RUS)										●		1	0	0
1	Ivan Dodig (CRO)										●		1	0	0
1	Juan Carlos Ferrero (ESP)										●		1	0	0
1	Mardy Fish (USA)										●		1	0	0
1	Ernests Gulbis (LAT)										●		1	0	0
1	Philipp Kohlschreiber (GER)										●		1	0	0
1	Florian Mayer (GER)										●		1	0	0
1	Gaël Monfils (FRA)										●		1	0	0
1	Milos Raonic (CAN)										●		1	0	0
1	Andreas Seppi (ITA)										●		1	0	0
1	Ryan Sweeting (USA)										●		1	0	0
1	Dmitry Tursunov (RUS)										●		1	0	0
1	Stanislas Wawrinka (SUI)										●		1	0	0
1	Alex Bogomolov Jr. (USA)											●	0	1	0
1	James Cerretani (USA)											●	0	1	0
1	Colin Fleming (GBR)											●	0	1	0
1	Fabio Fognini (ITA)											●	0	1	0
1	Ryan Harrison (USA)											●	0	1	0
1	Ross Hutchins (GBR)											●	0	1	0
1	Mark Knowles (BAH)											●	0	1	0
1	Marc López (ESP)											●	0	1	0
1	Leonardo Mayer (ARG)											●	0	1	0
1	Dick Norman (BEL)											●	0	1	0
1	André Sá (BRA)											●	0	1	0
1	Adil Shamasdin (CAN)											●	0	1	0
1	Ken Skupski (GBR)											●	0	1	0
1	Potito Starace (ITA)											●	0	1	0
1	Horacio Zeballos (ARG)											●	0	1	0

=== Titles won by nation ===
Total	Nation	Grand Slam			ATP Finals		Masters 1000		Tour 500		Tour 250		Total		
Total	Nation	S	D	X	S	D	S	D	S	D	S	D	S	D	X
25	United States (USA)		2	2				3	1	2	4	11	5	18	2
16	Serbia (SRB)	3					5	1	1	3	3		12	4	0
15	Spain (ESP)	1					1		3		8	2	13	2	0
9	Great Britain (GBR)						2		1	1	2	3	5	4	0
9	France (FRA)							1	1	3	4		5	4	0
8	Czech Republic (CZE)								2			6	2	6	0
7	Canada (CAN)		1	1		1		1		1	1	1	1	5	1
7	Austria (AUT)		1	1						2		3	0	6	1
6	India (IND)							3				3	0	6	0
6	Sweden (SWE)								1		3	2	4	2	0
6	Italy (ITA)										1	5	1	5	0
5	Germany (GER)		1							1	2	1	2	3	0
5	Switzerland (SUI)				1		1		1		2		5	0	0
4	Belarus (BLR)		1			1		1		1			0	4	0
4	Pakistan (PAK)							1				3	0	4	0
4	Romania (ROU)									1		3	0	4	0
4	Argentina (ARG)										2	2	2	2	0
4	Australia (AUS)											4	0	4	0
3	Ukraine (UKR)							1		1	1		1	2	0
3	Belgium (BEL)							1				2	0	3	0
3	Russia (RUS)									1	2		2	1	0
3	Brazil (BRA)											3	0	3	0
3	Curaçao (CUR)											3	0	3	0
3	Slovakia (SVK)											3	0	3	0
2	Mexico (MEX)									1		1	0	2	0
2	Croatia (CRO)										2		2	0	0
2	Netherlands (NED)										1	1	1	1	0
2	Israel (ISR)											2	0	2	0
1	Latvia (LAT)										1		1	0	0
1	South Africa (RSA)										1		1	0	0
1	Bahamas (BAH)											1	0	1	0

=== Titles information ===
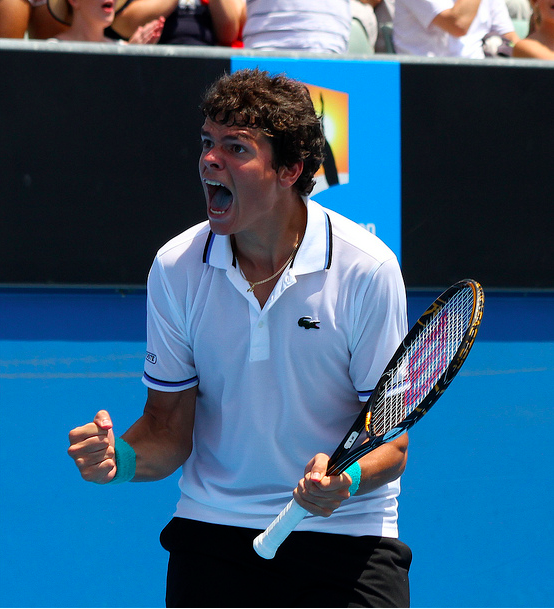
20-year-old ATP Newcomer of the Year Milos Raonic from Canada won his first ATP World Tour singles title in San Jose, defeating reigning champion Fernando Verdasco in the final.

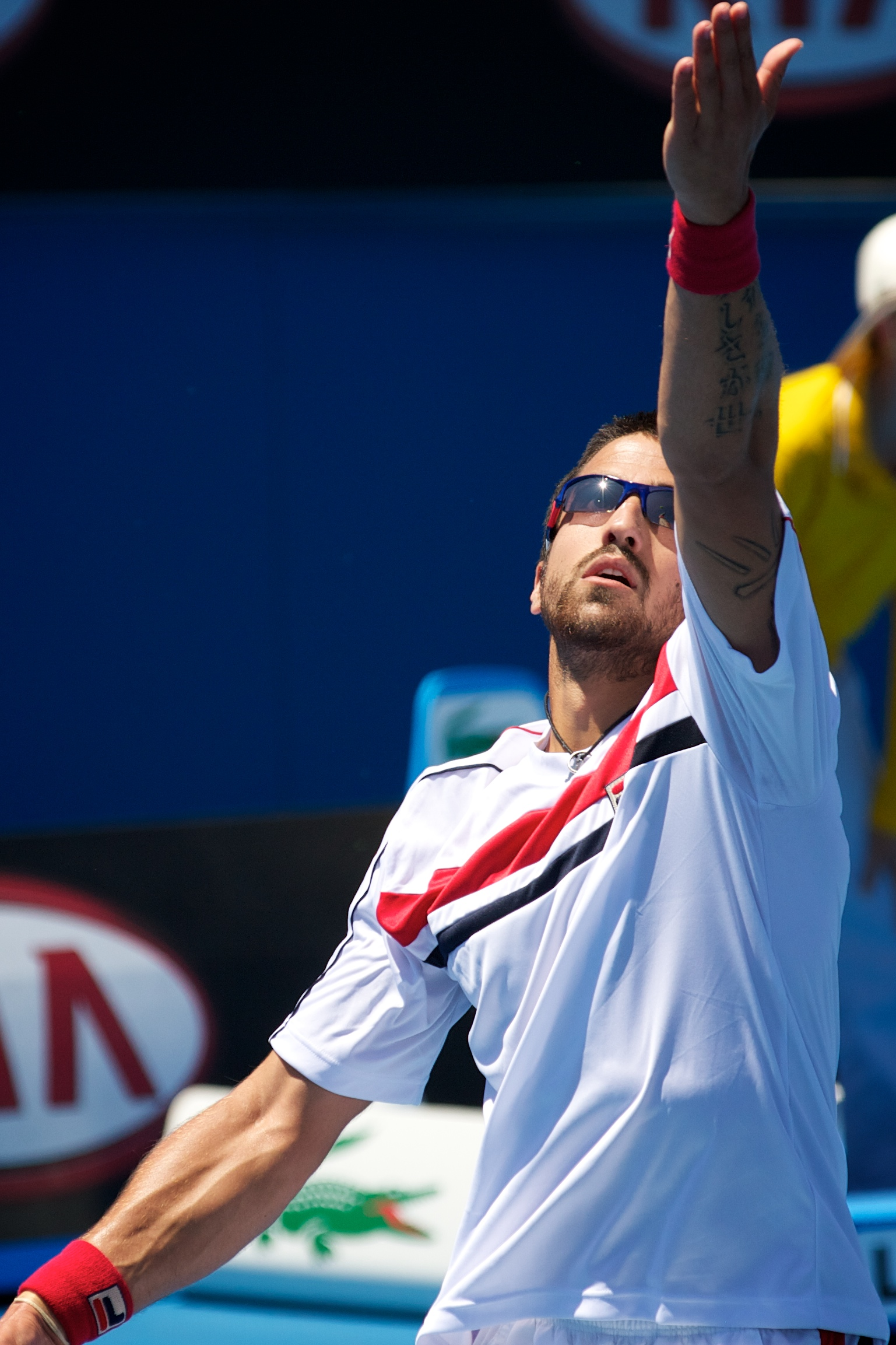
27-year-old and eventual World No. 9 and ATP World Tour Finals contender Janko Tipsarević claimed his maiden ATP World Tour singles title in Kuala Lumpur (def. Baghdatis).

The following players won their first main circuit title in singles, doubles, or mixed doubles:

Singles

- (South Africa) Kevin Anderson – Johannesburg (singles)
- (Croatia) Ivan Dodig – Zagreb (singles)
- (Canada) Milos Raonic – San Jose (singles)
- (Netherlands) Robin Haase – Kitzbühel (singles)
- (Ukraine) Alexandr Dolgopolov – Umag (singles)
- (Spain) Pablo Andújar – Casablanca (singles)
- (United States) Ryan Sweeting – Houston (singles)
- (Italy) Andreas Seppi – Eastbourne (singles)
- (Germany) Florian Mayer – Bucharest (singles)
- (Serbia) Janko Tipsarević – Kuala Lumpur (singles)

Doubles

- (Canada) Adil Shamasdin – Johannesburg (doubles)
- (Netherlands) Robin Haase – Marseille (doubles)
- (Argentina) Leonardo Mayer – Buenos Aires (doubles)
- (Ukraine) Alexandr Dolgopolov – Indian Wells (doubles)
- (Italy) Simone Bolelli – Munich (doubles)
- (Australia) Matthew Ebden – Newport (doubles)
- (United States) Ryan Harrison – Newport (doubles)
- (United States) Alex Bogomolov Jr. – Atlanta (doubles)
- (Austria) Alexander Peya – Hamburg (doubles)
- (Italy) Fabio Fognini – Umag (doubles)

Mixed doubles

- (United States) Scott Lipsky – French Open (mixed doubles)
- (Austria) Jürgen Melzer – Wimbledon Championships (mixed doubles)
- (United States) Jack Sock – US Open (mixed doubles)

The following players defended a main circuit title in singles, doubles, or mixed doubles:

- (United States) Bob Bryan – Australian Open (doubles), Houston (doubles), Madrid (doubles)
- (United States) Mike Bryan – Australian Open (doubles), Houston (doubles), Madrid (doubles)
- (Sweden) Robin Söderling – Rotterdam (singles)
- (Serbia) Novak Djokovic – Dubai (singles)
- (Sweden) Robert Lindstedt – Casablanca (doubles), Båstad (doubles)
- (Romania) Horia Tecău – Casablanca (doubles), Båstad (doubles)
- (Spain) Rafael Nadal – Monte Carlo (singles), French Open (singles)
- (Canada) Daniel Nestor – French Open (doubles), ATP World Tour Finals (doubles)
- (United States) Mardy Fish – Atlanta (singles)
- (United Kingdom) Andy Murray – Shanghai (singles)
- (Switzerland) Roger Federer – Basel (singles), ATP World Tour Finals (singles)

== Rankings ==
These are the ATP rankings, showing the race for the singles and doubles, and of the 2011 season, with number of rankings points, number of tournaments played, year-end ranking in 2010, highest and lowest position during the season (for singles and doubles individual only, as doubles team rankings are not calculated over a rolling year-to-date system), and number of spots gained or lost from the 2010 to the 2011 year-end rankings.

=== Singles ===
Race to the Finals Singles Rankings
#	Player	Points	Tours
1	Novak Djokovic (SRB)	13,475	18
2	Rafael Nadal (ESP)	9,375	19
3	Andy Murray (GBR)	7,380	18
4	Roger Federer (SUI)	6,670	18
5	David Ferrer (ESP)	4,480	22
6	Jo-Wilfried Tsonga (FRA)	3,535	24
7	Tomáš Berdych (CZE)	3,300	23
8	Mardy Fish (USA)	2,965	23
9	Janko Tipsarević (SRB)	2,395	27
10	Nicolás Almagro (ESP)	2,380	26
11	Juan Martín del Potro (ARG)	2,315	23
12	Gilles Simon (FRA)	2,165	28
13	Robin Söderling (SWE)	2,120	22
14	Andy Roddick (USA)	1,940	20
15	Gaël Monfils (FRA)	1,935	23
16	Alexandr Dolgopolov (UKR)	1,925	30
17	Stan Wawrinka (SUI)	1,820	23
18	John Isner (USA)	1,800	25
19	Richard Gasquet (FRA)	1,765	21
20	Feliciano López (ESP)	1,755	28

Year-end rankings 2011 (26 December 2011)
#	Player	Points	#Trn	'10 Rk	High	Low	'10→'11
1	Novak Djokovic (SRB)	13,630	19	3	1	3	▲2
2	Rafael Nadal (ESP)	9,595	20	1	1	2	▼1
3	Roger Federer (SUI)	8,170	19	2	2	4	▼1
4	Andy Murray (GBR)	7,380	19	4	3	5	Steady
5	David Ferrer (ESP)	4,925	23	7	5	7	▲2
6	Jo-Wilfried Tsonga (FRA)	4,335	25	13	6	22	▲7
7	Tomáš Berdych (CZE)	3,700	24	6	6	10	▼1
8	Mardy Fish (USA)	2,965	24	16	7	17	▲8
9	Janko Tipsarević (SRB)	2,595	28	49	9	52	▲40
10	Nicolás Almagro (ESP)	2,380	27	15	9	15	▲5
11	Juan Martín del Potro (ARG)	2,315	22	258	11	485	▲247
12	Gilles Simon (FRA)	2,165	28	41	11	41	▲29
13	Robin Söderling (SWE)	2,120	22	5	4	13	▼8
14	Andy Roddick (USA)	1,940	20	8	8	21	▼6
15	Alexandr Dolgopolov (UKR)	1,925	30	48	15	49	▲33
16	Gaël Monfils (FRA)	1,910	23	12	7	16	▼4
17	Stan Wawrinka (SUI)	1,820	23	21	13	21	▲4
18	John Isner (USA)	1,800	25	19	18	47	▲1
19	Richard Gasquet (FRA)	1,765	21	30	11	33	▲11
20	Feliciano López (ESP)	1,755	28	32	20	44	▲12

==== Number 1 ranking ====
Holder	Date gained	Date forfeited
Rafael Nadal (ESP)	Year-End 2010	3 July 2011
Novak Djokovic (SRB)	4 July 2011	Year-End 2011

=== Doubles ===
Year-end rankings 2011 (26 December 2011)
#	Team	Points	#Trn	'10 Rk	'10→'11
1	Bob Bryan (USA); Mike Bryan (USA)	10,410	24	1	Steady
2	Max Mirnyi (BLR); Daniel Nestor (CAN)	8,480	23	–	▲NR
3	Michaël Llodra (FRA); Nenad Zimonjić (SRB)	7,500	20	–	▲NR
4	Mahesh Bhupathi (IND); Leander Paes (IND)	5,170	16	223	▲219
5	Rohan Bopanna (IND); Aisam-ul-Haq Qureshi (PAK)	4,650	27	8	▲3
6	Robert Lindstedt (SWE); Horia Tecău (ROU)	4,240	24	11	▲5
7	Jürgen Melzer (AUT); Philipp Petzschner (GER)	4,210	15	10	▲3
8	Mariusz Fyrstenberg (POL); Marcin Matkowski (POL)	4,070	26	4	▼4
9	Eric Butorac (USA); Jean-Julien Rojer (AHO)	3,150	30	19	▲10
10	Marcelo Melo (BRA); Bruno Soares (BRA)	2,345	27	14	▲4

Year-end rankings 2011 (26 December 2011)
#	Player	Points	#Trn	'10 Rk	High	Low	'10→'11
1	Bob Bryan (USA)	9,920	24	1T	1T	1T	Steady
=	Mike Bryan (USA)	9,920	24	1T	1T	1T	Steady
3	Max Mirnyi (BLR)	8,210	23	7	3	7	▲4
=	Daniel Nestor (CAN)	8,210	24	3T	3	5T	Steady
5	Michaël Llodra (FRA)	7,500	21	29	3	29	▲24
6	Nenad Zimonjić (SRB)	7,500	25	3T	3	6	▼3
7	Mahesh Bhupathi (IND)	5,270	20	6	5	7	▼1
8	Leander Paes (IND)	5,170	17	5	5	11	▼3
9	Aisam-ul-Haq Qureshi (PAK)	4,720	29	18	8	20	▲9
10	Philipp Petzschner (GER)	4,605	29	20	9	26	▲10
11	Rohan Bopanna (IND)	4,560	28	16	9	19	▲5
12	Horia Tecău (ROU)	4,310	30	19	9	22	▲7
13	Jürgen Melzer (AUT)	4,260	19	8	7	16	▼5
14	Marcin Matkowski (POL)	4,195	27	12T	9	15T	▲2
=	Mariusz Fyrstenberg (POL)	4,195	27	12T	10	16	▲2
16	Robert Lindstedt (SWE)	3,910	26	21	12	22	▲5
17	Oliver Marach (AUT)	3,100	30	11	9	18	▼6
18	Alexander Peya (AUT)	2,890	31	103	18	103	▲85
19	Bruno Soares (BRA)	2,840	32	35	19	38	▲16
20	Eric Butorac (USA)	2,700	30	36	17T	36	▲16
=	Jean-Julien Rojer (AHO)	2,700	30	41	17	41	▲21

== Prize money leaders ==
#	Player	Singles	Doubles	Year-to-date
1	Novak Djokovic (SRB)	$12,595,903	$23,900	$12,619,803
2	Rafael Nadal (ESP)	$7,603,218	$64,996	$7,668,214
3	Roger Federer (SUI)	$6,320,726	$48,850	$6,369,576
4	Andy Murray (GBR)	$5,088,235	$91,856	$5,180,091
5	Jo-Wilfried Tsonga (FRA)	$3,128,436	$45,533	$3,173,969
6	David Ferrer (ESP)	$3,104,854	$9,050	$3,113,904
7	Tomáš Berdych (CZE)	$2,521,127	$55,686	$2,576,813
8	Mardy Fish (USA)	$1,830,629	$51,462	$1,882,091
9	Janko Tipsarević (SRB)	$1,614,588	$78,324	$1,692,912
10	Nicolás Almagro (ESP)	$1,511,185	$59,822	$1,571,007
as of December 5, 2011

== Statistics leaders ==
as of 28 November 2011

ACES
Pos	Player	Aces	Matches
1	(France) Jo-Wilfried Tsonga	825	79
2	(United States) John Isner	811	58
3	(Spain) Feliciano López	734	62
4	(South Africa) Kevin Anderson	719	69
5	(Canada) Milos Raonic	637	50
6	(Croatia) Ivo Karlović	632	37
7	(United States) Andy Roddick	567	50
8	(Ukraine) Alexandr Dolgopolov	559	67
9	(Spain) Nicolás Almagro	546	70
10	(Switzerland) Roger Federer	504	76

SERVICE GAMES WON
Pos	Player	%	Matches
1	(United States) John Isner	91	58
2	(Switzerland) Roger Federer	90	76
3	(Argentina) Juan Martín del Potro	88	66
4	(Canada) Milos Raonic	88	50
5	(United States) Andy Roddick	87	50
6	(Serbia) Novak Djokovic	86	76
7	(France) Jo-Wilfried Tsonga	86	79
8	(Spain) Feliciano López	86	62
9	(South Africa) Kevin Anderson	86	69
10	(Czech Republic) Tomáš Berdych	85	76

BREAK POINTS SAVED
Pos	Player	%	Matches
1	(Argentina) Juan Martín del Potro	67	64
2	(Spain) Feliciano López	67	59
3	(South Africa) Kevin Anderson	66	67
4	(Canada) Milos Raonic	66	49
5	(Spain) David Ferrer	66	70
6	(Serbia) Novak Djokovic	66	71
7	(France) Jo-Wilfried Tsonga	66	70
8	(Switzerland) Roger Federer	65	76
9	(United States) Andy Roddick	65	48
10	(United States) Alex Bogomolov Jr.	65	46

FIRST SERVE PERCENTAGE
Pos	Player	%	Matches
1	(United States) Alex Bogomolov Jr.	71	46
2	(Russia) Nikolay Davydenko	71	49
3	(Italy) Potito Starace	71	50
4	(United States) John Isner	69	52
5	(Spain) Fernando Verdasco	69	58
6	(Spain) Rafael Nadal	68	79
7	(South Africa) Kevin Anderson	67	67
8	(Romania) Victor Hănescu	67	41
9	(Argentina) Juan Ignacio Chela	66	53
10	(Argentina) Juan Mónaco	66	53

FIRST SERVICE POINTS WON
Pos	Player	%	Matches
1	(Switzerland) Roger Federer	79	76
2	(Canada) Milos Raonic	79	50
3	(France) Jo-Wilfried Tsonga	78	70
4	(Czech Republic) Tomáš Berdych	78	68
5	(Spain) Feliciano López	78	59
6	(Croatia) Ivan Ljubičić	77	44
7	(United States) Andy Roddick	77	48
8	(United States) John Isner	77	52
9	(Argentina) Juan Martín del Potro	76	64
10	(Spain) Nicolás Almagro	76	69

SECOND SERVE POINTS WON
Pos	Player	%	Matches
1	(Serbia) Novak Djokovic	58	76
2	(Switzerland) Roger Federer	57	76
3	(Spain) Rafael Nadal	57	84
4	(United States) Andy Roddick	56	48
5	(United States) John Isner	56	52
6	(Serbia) Janko Tipsarević	56	76
7	(Argentina) Juan Martín del Potro	55	64
8	(Spain) David Ferrer	55	70
9	(United States) Mardy Fish	55	63
10	(Croatia) Marin Čilić	55	65

POINTS WON RETURNING 1ST SERVICE
Pos	Player	%	Matches
1	(United Kingdom) Andy Murray	37	65
2	(Serbia) Novak Djokovic	36	71
3	(Spain) Rafael Nadal	35	79
4	(Argentina) Juan Ignacio Chela	34	53
5	(Argentina) Juan Mónaco	34	53
6	(Serbia) Viktor Troicki	34	64
7	(Russia) Nikolay Davydenko	34	49
8	(France) Gaël Monfils	33	53
9	(Switzerland) Roger Federer	33	66
10	(Spain) David Ferrer	33	70

BREAK POINTS CONVERTED
Pos	Player	%	Matches
1	(Belgium) Xavier Malisse	49	50
2	(Serbia) Novak Djokovic	48	71
3	(Spain) Rafael Nadal	47	79
4	(United Kingdom) Andy Murray	47	65
5	(Italy) Fabio Fognini	46	51
6	(Argentina) Juan Ignacio Chela	46	53
7	(Spain) David Ferrer	46	70
8	(Sweden) Robin Söderling	46	47
9	(Czech Republic) Tomáš Berdych	45	68
10	(Germany) Florian Mayer	45	69

RETURN GAMES WON
Pos	Player	%	Matches
1	(Serbia) Novak Djokovic	40	71
2	(United Kingdom) Andy Murray	37	65
3	(Spain) Rafael Nadal	35	79
4	(Spain) David Ferrer	33	70
5	(Argentina) Juan Ignacio Chela	32	53
6	(Argentina) Juan Mónaco	30	53
7	(Italy) Fabio Fognini	29	51
8	(Russia) Nikolay Davydenko	29	49
9	(Czech Republic) Tomáš Berdych	29	68
10	(France) Gilles Simon	29	65

== Best matches by ATPWorldTour.com ==
=== Best 5 Grand Slam / Davis Cup Matches ===
	Event	Round	Surface	Winner	Opponent	Result
1.	US Open	SF	Hard	(Serbia) Novak Djokovic	(Switzerland) Roger Federer	6–7^{(2–7)}, 4–6, 6–3, 6–2, 7–5
2.	French Open	SF	Clay	(Switzerland) Roger Federer	(Serbia) Novak Djokovic	7–6^{(7–5)}, 6–3, 3–6, 7–6^{(7–5)}
3.	Davis Cup	F	Clay	(Spain) Rafael Nadal	(Argentina) Juan Martín del Potro	1–6, 6–4, 6–1, 7–6^{(7–0)}
4.	Australian Open	R1	Hard	(Argentina) David Nalbandian	(Australia) Lleyton Hewitt	3–6, 6–4, 3–6, 7–6^{(7–1)}, 9–7
5.	French Open	R1	Clay	(Spain) Rafael Nadal	(United States) John Isner	6–4, 6–7^{(2–7)}, 6–7^{(2–7)}, 6–2, 6–4

=== Best 5 ATP World Tour matches ===
	Event	Round	Surface	Winner	Opponent	Result
1.	Italian Open	SF	Clay	(Serbia) Novak Djokovic	(United Kingdom) Andy Murray	6–1, 3–6, 7–6^{(7–2)}
2.	Miami Open	F	Hard	(Serbia) Novak Djokovic	(Spain) Rafael Nadal	4–6, 6–3, 7–6^{(7–4)}
3.	ATP Finals	RR	Hard (i)	(Czech Republic) Tomáš Berdych	(Serbia) Janko Tipsarević	2–6, 6–3, 7–6^{(8–6)}
4.	US National Indoor	F	Hard (i)	(United States) Andy Roddick	(Canada) Milos Raonic	7–6^{(8–6)}, 6–7^{(13–11)}, 7–5
5.	Italian Open	R3	Clay	(France) Richard Gasquet	(Switzerland) Roger Federer	4–6, 7–6^{(7–2)}, 7–6^{(7–4)}

== Point distribution ==
Tournament Category	W	F	SF	QF	R16	R32	R64	R128	QLFR	Q3	Q2	Q1
Grand Slam (128S)	2000	1200	720	360	180	90	45	10	25	16	8	0
Grand Slam (64D)	2000	1200	720	360	180	90	0	–	25	–	0	0
ATP World Tour Finals (8S/8D)	1500^ 1100^{m}	1000^ 600^{m}	600^ 200^{m}	(200 for each round robin match win, +400 for a semifinal win, +500 for the final win)								
1000 series (96S)	1000	600	360	180	90	45	25	10	16	–	8	0
1000 series (56S/48S)	1000	600	360	180	90	45	10	–	25	–	16	0
1000 series (32D/24D)	1000	600	360	180	90	0	–	–	–	–	–	–
500 series (56S/48S)	500	300	180	90	45	20	0	–	10	–	4	0
500 series (32S)	500	300	180	90	45	0	–	–	20	–	10	0
500 series (24D)	500	300	180	90	45	0	–	–	–	–	–	–
500 series (16D)	500	300	180	90	0	–	–	–	–	–	–	–
250 series (56S/48S)	250	150	90	45	20	10	0	–	5	3	0	0
250 series (32S/28S)	250	150	90	45	20	0	–	–	12	6	0	0
250 series (24D)	250	150	90	45	20	0	–	–	–	–	–	–
250 series (16D)	250	150	90	45	0	–	–	–	–	–	–	–

Davis Cup
Rubber category		Match win	Match loss	Team bonus	Performance bonus	Total achievable
Singles	Play-offs	5 / 10^{1}				15
Singles	First round	40	10^{2}			80
Singles	Quarterfinals	65				130
Singles	Semifinals	70				140
Singles	Final	75		75^{3}	125^{4}	150 / 225^{3} / 275^{4}
Singles	Cumulative total	500		500 to 535^{3}	625^{4}	625^{4}
Doubles	Play-offs	10				10
Doubles	First round	50	10^{2}			50
Doubles	Quarterfinals	80				80
Doubles	Semifinals	90				90
Doubles	Final	95		35^{5}		95 / 130^{5}
Doubles	Cumulative total	315		350^{5}		350^{5}

The Davis Cup World Group and World Group Play-Off matches awarded ATP Ranking points from 2009 to 2015.

Glossary

Only live matches earn points; dead rubbers earn no points. If a player does not compete in the singles of one or more rounds he will receive points from the previous round when playing singles at the next tie. This last rule also applies for playing in doubles matches.

^{1} A player who wins a singles rubber in the first day of the tie is awarded 5 points, whereas a singles rubber win in tie's last day grants 10 points for a total of 15 available points.

^{2} For the first round only, any player who competes in a live rubber, without a win, receives 10 ranking points for participation.

^{3} Team bonus awarded to a singles player who wins 7 live matches in a calendar year and his team wins the competition.

^{4} Performance bonus awarded to a singles player who wins 8 live matches in a calendar year. In this case, no Team bonus is awarded.

^{5} Team bonus awarded to an unchanged doubles team who wins 4 matches in a calendar year and his team wins the competition.

World Team Cup
Match type	1st round	2nd round	3rd round	Finals	Points	Bonus	Total
Singles 1	35	35	35	95	200	50	250
Singles 2	25	25	25	50	125	50	175
Deciding match (doubles)	35	35	35	95	200	50	250
Dead rubber (doubles)	10	10	10	20	50		50

- Players who only play the finals will be awarded points from the previous round.
- Players must win all 4 matches and be part of the winning team in order to earn the Bonus Points.

== Retirements and comebacks ==
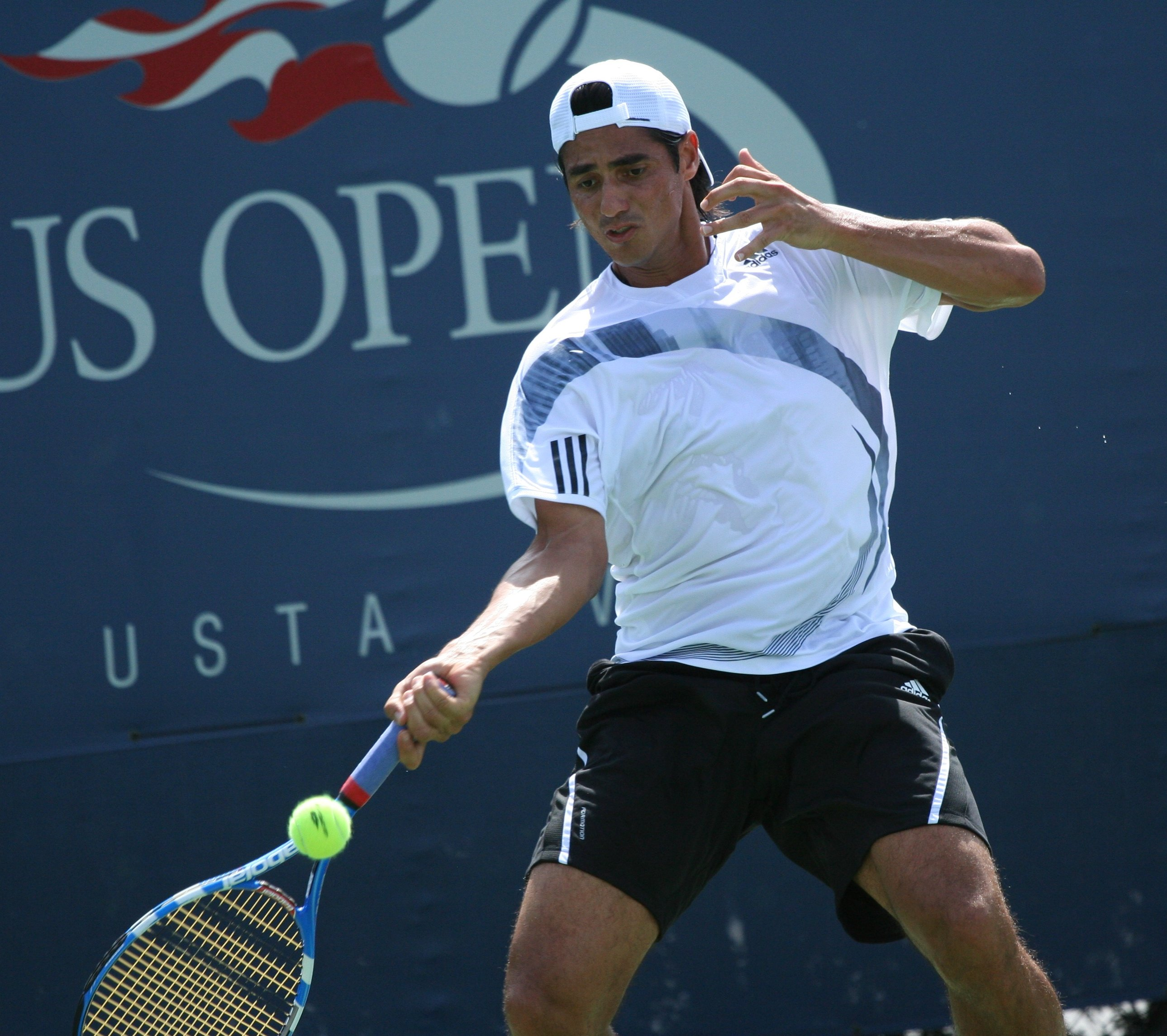
Nicolás Lapentti ended the 1999 season in the top 10, after making the Australian Open semifinals.

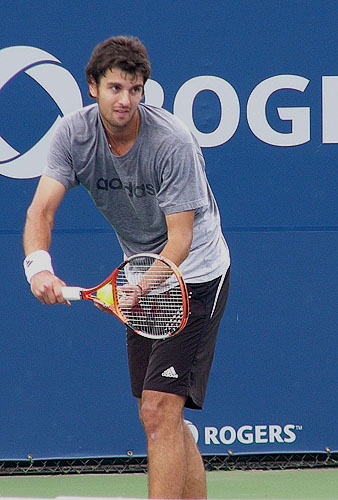
Mario Ančić won the bronze medal at the 2004 Athens Olympics doubles event with fellow Croatian Ivan Ljubičić.

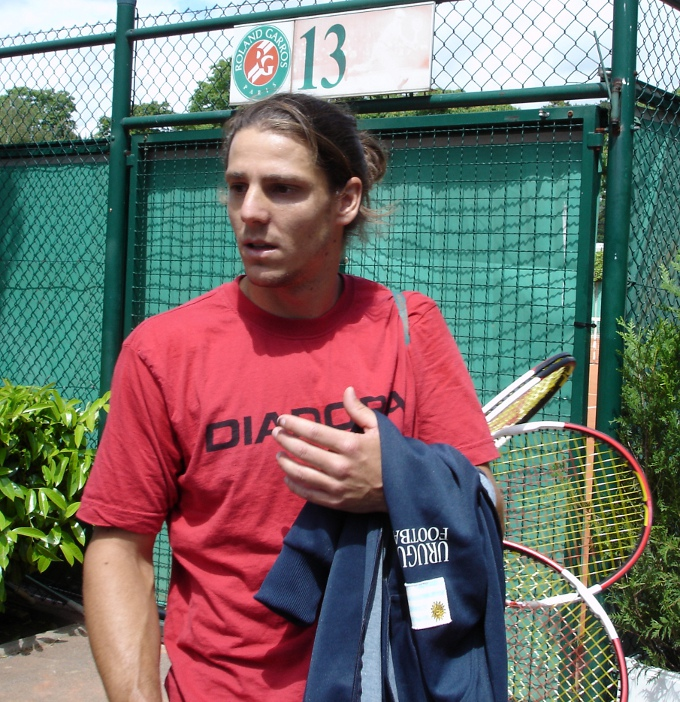
Gastón Gaudio is the only player to have won a Grand Slam title (the 2004 French Open) saving match points in the final.

Following is a list of notable players (winners of a main tour title, and/or part of the ATP rankings top 100 (singles) or top 50 (doubles) for at least one week) who announced their retirement from professional tennis, became inactive (after not playing for more than 52 weeks), or were permanently banned from playing, during the 2011 season:

- Yves Allegro (born 28 August 1978 in Grône, Switzerland) began his professional career in 1997, peaking at no. 32 in doubles in 2004. Allegro collected three doubles titles on the main tour. He played his last event in the main circuit at the 2011 Crédit Agricole Suisse Open Gstaad and in the challenger circuit at the 2011 Città di Como Challenger in August.
- Mario Ančić (born 30 March 1984 in Split, SFR Yugoslavia, now Croatia) joined the circuit in 2001, and peaked at no. 7 in singles in 2006 and no. 47 in doubles in 2004. A junior world no. 1, Ančić won three singles and five doubles titles on the main tour, scoring his best Grand Slam results with a quarterfinal at the French Open (2006) and a semifinal at Wimbledon (2004). He was also part of the Croatian team that won the Davis Cup trophy in 2005. Diminished by a recurring bout of mononucleosis and then back problems since 2007, Ančić eventually decided to retire from the sport to pursue a career as a lawyer. He played his last tournament in Munich in May 2010.
- Simon Aspelin (born 11 May 1974 in Saltsjöbaden, Sweden) turned professional in 1998, reaching his peak at doubles no. 7 in 2008. One-time runner-up at the Tennis Masters Cup (2007), Aspelin won 12 doubles titles, including one major at the US Open (2007, def. Dlouhý/Vízner) with Austrian Julian Knowle. Alongside fellow Swede Thomas Johansson Aspelin won the silver medal at the 2008 Beijing Olympics doubles event (lost to Federer/Wawrinka). He played his last tournament in Båstad in July.
- Marcos Daniel (born 4 July 1978 in Passo Fundo, Brazil) joined the circuit in 1997, reaching his career-high singles ranking of no. 56 in 2009. Daniel's success came mostly on the ATP Challenger Tour, where he collected 14 singles and eight doubles titles. He last competed on the main circuit in Estoril in April.
- Ashley Fisher (born 25 September 1975 in New South Wales, Australia) began his professional career in 1998, peaking at no. 19 in doubles in 2009. Fisher was a doubles semifinalist at the US Open (2006) – his best Grand Slam result, and collected four doubles titles on the main tour. He played his last event in Beijing in October.
- Gastón Gaudio (born 9 December 1978 in Temperley, Argentina) turned professional in 1996 and reached a career-high singles ranking of world no. 5 in 2005, making the year-end top 10 twice (2004–05). Over the course of his 15-year career, Gaudio collected three doubles and eight singles titles on the main circuit, among which one French Open title (2004, def. Coria, saving two match points in the final) – the only time the Argentinian went past the fourth round in a Grand Slam event. After four years spent out of the Top 100, Gaudio chose to retire from the sport. He played his last match at the Kitzbühel Challenger in August 2010.
- Óscar Hernández (born 10 April 1978 in Barcelona, Spain)'arrived on the main tour in 1998, peaking at the no. 48 spot in singles in 2007. Hernández, winner of one doubles titles on the main circuit, decided to retire after complications following a spinal disc herniation operation. He played his last match at the Naples Challenger in September 2010.
- Joachim Johansson (born 1 July 1982 in Lund, Sweden) turned professional in 2000, and reached a career high of no. 9 in singles in 2005. Winner of three singles and one doubles titles, the six-foot six's best Grand Slam performance came with a semifinal appearance at the US Open (2004). His career stuck by shoulder and elbow injuries, Johansson opted for retirement in early 2008 before deciding for a comeback later in the season. He played his last match at a Swiss ITF Men's Circuit event in March.
- Stefan Koubek (born 2 January 1977 in Klagenfurt, Austria) joined the main tour in 1994 and peaked at no. 20 in singles in 2000. The Austrian collected three singles and one doubles titles on the circuit, his best Grand Slam result coming with a quarterfinal showing at the Australian Open (2002). Koubek played his final tournament in Kitzbühel in August.
- Nicolás Lapentti (born 13 August 1976 in Guayaquil, Ecuador) turned professional in 1995, and reached his highest singles ranking, no. 6, in late 1999. Boys' doubles champion at the French Open and at the US Open in 1994, Lapentti went on to collect five singles and three doubles titles on the main circuit, his best Grand Slam results coming with a quarterfinal at Wimbledon (2002) and a semifinal at the Australian Open (1999). He played his last match at the French Open in May 2010.
- Harel Levy (born 5 August 1978 in Ramat HaSharon, Israel) became a tennis professional in 1995, reaching his career-best singles ranking of no. 30 in 2001. During his sixteen-year career, Levy played on both the main and the Challenger Tour, winning one ATP doubles title. He played his last match at the Granby Challenger in July.
- Wesley Moodie (born 14 February 1979 in Durban, South Africa) came on the main tour in 2000, reaching the no. 57 singles spot in 2005, and the no. 8 doubles spot in 2009. Winner of one singles and six doubles titles, including one Grand Slam title at Wimbledon with Stephen Huss (2005, def. B. Bryan/M. Bryan), Moodie also finished as runner-up in mixed doubles at Wimbledon (2010, partnering Lisa Raymond) and in doubles at the French Open (2009, with Dick Norman). He last played at Wimbledon in June.
- Thomas Muster (born 2 October 1967 in Leibnitz, Austria) joined the tour in 1985 and unofficially retired in 1999, eventually returning to competition in 2010. In his first 14-year stint on the circuit, Muster was ranked world no. 1 and collected 44 singles titles (including one French Open (1995, def. Chang)). During his comeback, the Austrian compiled win–loss records of 0–3 on the main tour and 2–20 at the Challenger level, reaching his new best ranking, no. 847 (singles), in September 2011. Muster officially played his last main tour event in Vienna in October, but has not ruled out remaining active for the 2012 ATP Challenger Tour season.
- Vincent Spadea (born 18 July 1974 in Chicago, United States) became a tennis professional in 1993, peaking at no. 18 in singles in 2005. The American collected one singles and three doubles titles on the main circuit, his best Grand Slam result coming with a semifinal run at the Australian Open (1999). Spadea became inactive after not playing for more than 52 weeks, competing for the last time in the Newport qualifying draw in July 2010.
- Fernando Vicente (born 8 March 1977 in Benicarló, Spain) turned professional in 1996, and reached a career high of no. 29 in singles in 2000, and doubles no. 61 in 2006. Winner of three singles and two doubles titles, the best Grand Slam performance came with a fourth round appearance at the 2000 French Open. Vicente played his last match at the Košice Open Challenger qualifying in June.
- Kristof Vliegen (born 22 June 1982 in Maaseik, Belgium) became a tennis pro in 2001, reaching career-high rankings of singles no. 30 in 2006, and doubles no. 40 in 2007. Junior doubles champion at Wimbledon (2000), Vliegen's success came mostly on the ATP Challenger Tour. He played for the last time in the Cherbourg Challenger qualifying in February.

Following is a list of notable players (winners of a main tour title, and/or part of the ATP rankings top 100 (singles) or top 50 (doubles) for at least one week) who came out of retirement from professional tennis during the 2011 season:

- Goran Ivanišević (born 13 September 1971 in Split, SFR Yugoslavia, now Croatia) turned professional in 1988, and reached his highest singles ranking, no. 2, in July 1994. Ivanišević went on to collect 22 singles and nine doubles titles on the main circuit, his best Grand Slam results being four Wimbledon finals (three losses, one win (2001, def. Rafter)). The Croat retired in 2004 but made a one-off return on the ATP World Tour to play doubles with Marin Čilić in Zagreb in January – the pair eventually lost in straight sets in the first round.
- Jacco Eltingh (born 29 August 1970 in Heerde, Netherlands) and Paul Haarhuis (born 19 February 1966 in Eindhoven, Netherlands) first played on the main circuit from 1988 to 1999 (Eltingh) and from 1989 to 2003 (Haarhuis). Both men occupied the doubles world no. 1 position, Eltingh for a total of 63 weeks between 1995 and 1999, Haarhuis for 71 weeks between 1994 and 1999, the two finishing respectively four (1994–1995, 1997–1998) and eight (1993–2000) seasons in the doubles Top Ten. Together, the pair collected 36 tour titles, including one year-end championships title (1998), and completed a career Grand Slam (Australian Open (1994), French Open (1995, 1998), Wimbledon (1998), US Open (1994)). Eltingh and Haarhuis decided for a one-off return to the circuit at the February Rotterdam 500 event – the pair lost in straight sets in the first round.

== See also ==
- 2011 WTA Tour
- 2011 ATP Challenger Tour
- 2011 ITF Women's Circuit
- 2011 ITF Futures tournaments
- Association of Tennis Professionals
- International Tennis Federation

== Notes ==
- ^{a} Group A runner-up Belgium (eventual runner-up) replaced Group A winner Serbia for the title match after Serbian player Ana Ivanovic withdrew from the event before the final with an abdomen injury.
- ^{b} Lukáš Dlouhý and Paul Hanley won the final after Robert Lindstedt and Horia Tecău were forced to retire because of a left calf injury contracted by Lindstedt.
- ^{c} Michaël Llodra and Nenad Zimonjić (eventual runners-up) advanced to the final after Philipp Kohlschreiber and Tomáš Berdych were forced to withdraw because of a flu contracted by Berdych.
- ^{d} Milos Raonic (eventual champion) advanced to the final after Gaël Monfils withdrew from the event because of a left wrist injury.
- ^{e} Tomáš Berdych withdrew from the tournament after he was unable to serve in the third set against Djokovic due to a left quadriceps injury. Djokovic's advancement eventually led to his third consecutive title in Dubai.
- ^{f} Tommy Robredo retired ahead of his quarterfinal match with a strained left adductor muscle, which he suffered during his match against Sam Querrey in the fourth round. His withdrawal allowed Juan Martín del Potro to advance to a masters semifinal after a 17-month hiatus since being a runner-up for the 2009 Rogers Masters
- ^{g} Gilles Simon retired after 3–0 loss in the first set suffering from a stiff neck. Roger Federer advanced to semis for the fifth time in Miami.
- ^{h} Janko Tipsarević withdrew prior to the semifinal match due to right thigh injury. Due to this walkover scheduled opponent Novak Djokovic claimed his second Serbia Open title.
- ^{i} Milos Raonic suffered a back injury and subsequently gave up the match with Fernando Verdasco at the very beginning of the second set while he was one set down, 4–6. Verdasco advanced in the final.
- ^{j} The American runners up Mardy Fish and Andy Roddick was forced to step back before the start of the match due to the right shoulder injury of Roddick. Last year finalists Sam Querrey and John Isner won their first Masters title and second overall.
- ^{k} Robin Haase gave up the match while being down at second set to 2–0 against Victor Hănescu. He twisted his ankle and as a result he retired from his second quarterfinal of the year (ATP tour level). In the Dutchman's eighth career quarterfinal, he failed for the seventh time to advance. Hănescu has already won one title and will face his second semifinal of the year.
- ^{l} Fabio Fognini withdrew after his 5-set match victory over Albert Montañés, which caused him a left leg injury. Ahead of his first French open/Grand Slam quarterfinal against Novak Djokovic he was forced to withdraw resulting in Djokovic keeping his unbeatable record and reaching the semifinals.
- ^{m} Andreas Seppi won the final after Janko Tipsarević was forced to retire late in the match due to a right hip injury.
- ^{n} The final was originally scheduled to take place on 17 June but due to rain delays it was eventually played on 19 June and moved to Roehampton.
