= 2011 U.S. Men's Clay Court Championships – Singles Qualifying =

This article displays the qualifying draw of the 2011 U.S. Men's Clay Court Championships.

== Players ==
=== Seeds ===
1. (United States) Alex Bogomolov Jr. (qualifying competition)
2. (United States) Donald Young (qualifying competition)
3. (Australia) Marinko Matosevic (second round)
4. (Chile) Paul Capdeville (qualified)
5. (South Africa) Rik de Voest (first round)
6. (Croatia) Franko Škugor (qualified)
7. (Croatia) Ivo Karlović (qualified)
8. (Slovenia) Grega Žemlja (second round)

=== Qualifiers ===
1. (Croatia) Franko Škugor
2. (Croatia) Ivo Karlović
3. (United States) Tim Smyczek
4. (Chile) Paul Capdeville

== Qualifying draw ==
=== First qualifier ===
First round
1	(United States) Alex Bogomolov Jr.	6	6
(Australia) Joseph Sirianni	1	2
(Chile) Nicolás Massú	3	6	6
(United States) Michael Yani	6	1	4
(South Korea) Daniel Yoo	2	6	6
(Mexico) Santiago González	6	2	3
(United States) Jesse Witten	1	2
6	(Croatia) Franko Škugor	6	6

Second round
1	(United States) Alex Bogomolov Jr.	6	6
(Chile) Nicolás Massú	4	1
(South Korea) Daniel Yoo	6	0	2
6	(Croatia) Franko Škugor	4	6	6

Qualifying competition
1	(United States) Alex Bogomolov Jr.	6	1	4
6	(Croatia) Franko Škugor	2	6	6

=== Second qualifier ===
First round
2	(United States) Donald Young	6	6
WC	(United States) Ashok Narayana	0	1
(South Korea) Jun Woong-sun	3	4
(Canada) Peter Polansky	6	6
(United States) Greg Ouelette	1	3
(Argentina) José Acasuso	6	6
WC	(United States) Stuart Kenyon	1	1
7	(Croatia) Ivo Karlović	6	6

Second round
2	(United States) Donald Young	6	6
(Canada) Peter Polansky	3	4
(Argentina) José Acasuso	6^{6}	7^{11}	1
7	(Croatia) Ivo Karlović	7^{8}	6^{9}	6

Qualifying competition
2	(United States) Donald Young	4	4
7	(Croatia) Ivo Karlović	6	6

=== Third qualifier ===
First round
3	(Australia) Marinko Matosevic	6	1	6
(South Africa) Fritz Wolmarans	4	6	3
(Canada) Frank Dancevic	7^{7}	7
WC	(United States) Andrea Collarini	6^{2}	5
WC	(United States) Denis Kudla	6	3	4
(United States) Tim Smyczek	4	6	6
(Canada) Philip Bester	6	6
5	(South Africa) Rik de Voest	2	4

Second round
3	(Australia) Marinko Matosevic	6^{10}	1
(Canada) Frank Dancevic	7^{12}	6
(United States) Tim Smyczek	4	6	6
(Canada) Philip Bester	6	2	4

Qualifying competition
(Canada) Frank Dancevic	3	6^{4}
(United States) Tim Smyczek	6	7^{7}

=== Fourth qualifier ===
First round
4	(Chile) Paul Capdeville	6	7
(Uzbekistan) Farrukh Dustov	3	5
(United States) Alex Kuznetsov	5
(Bosnia and Herzegovina) Amer Delić	1^{r}
(United States) Jesse Levine	4	6	5
(United States) Rajeev Ram	6	4	7
(Sweden) Michael Ryderstedt	1	4
8	(Slovenia) Grega Žemlja	6	6

Second round
4	(Chile) Paul Capdeville	7^{8}	6
(United States) Alex Kuznetsov	6^{6}	2
(United States) Rajeev Ram	6	6
8	(Slovenia) Grega Žemlja	4	3

Qualifying competition
4	(Chile) Paul Capdeville	7^{8}	6^{5}	6
(United States) Rajeev Ram	6^{6}	7^{7}	4
