= 2011 U.S. Men's Clay Court Championships – Singles =

Singles
- 2011 U.S. Men's Clay Court Championships
- 2010 Champion: (Argentina) Juan Ignacio Chela

Final
- Champion: (United States) Ryan Sweeting
- Runner-up: (Japan) Kei Nishikori
- Score: 6–4, 7–6^{(7–3)}

Details
- Draw: 28
- Seeds: 8

Events
Singles	Doubles
- U.S. Men's Clay Court Championships

Juan Ignacio Chela was the defending champion, but could not defend his title since he withdrew from the tournament for personal reasons.
In the final match, Ryan Sweeting claimed the title, defeating Kei Nishikori 6–4, 7–6^{(7–3)}.

== Seeds ==
The top four seeds received a bye into the second round.

1. (United States) Mardy Fish (quarterfinals)
2. (United States) Sam Querrey (second round)
3. (Spain) Guillermo García López (quarterfinals)
4. (United States) John Isner (quarterfinals)
5. (Germany) Benjamin Becker (first round)
6. (Japan) Kei Nishikori (final)
7. (Uruguay) Pablo Cuevas (semifinals)
8. (Bulgaria) Grigor Dimitrov (second round)

== Draw ==
Key

- Q = Qualifier
- WC = Wild card
- LL = Lucky loser
- Alt = Alternate
- ITF = ITF entry
- PR = Protected ranking
- SR = Special ranking
- SE = Special exempt
- JE = Junior exempt
- JR = Junior Accelerator Programme entrant
- CO = College Accelerator Programme entrant
- NG = Next Gen Accelerator Program entrant
- w/o = Walkover
- r = Retired
- d = Defaulted

=== Finals ===
Semifinals
6	(Japan) Kei Nishikori	6	7
7	(Uruguay) Pablo Cuevas	3	5
Q	(Croatia) Ivo Karlović	6^{3}	3
WC	(United States) Ryan Sweeting	7^{7}	6

Final
6	(Japan) Kei Nishikori	4	6^{3}
WC	(United States) Ryan Sweeting	6	7^{7}

=== Top half ===
First round
(Spain) A Ramos	6	7
(Argentina) B Dabul	4	5
(Russia) I Andreev	6	6
(United States) M Russell	2	3
Q	(Croatia) F Škugor	3	2
6	(Japan) K Nishikori	6	6
(United States) R Kendrick	2	1
(India) S Devvarman	6	6
WC	(United States) J Blake	6^{3}	6	6
(Argentina) C Berlocq	7^{7}	3	4
(Brazil) R Mello	2	0
7	(Uruguay) P Cuevas	6	6

Second round
1	(United States) M Fish	6	6
(Spain) A Ramos	3	4
(Russia) I Andreev	3	3
6	(Japan) K Nishikori	6	6
3	(Spain) G García López	6	6
(India) S Devvarman	4	1
WC	(United States) J Blake	5	1
7	(Uruguay) P Cuevas	7	6

Quarterfinals
1	(United States) M Fish	3	2
6	(Japan) K Nishikori	6	6
3	(Spain) G García López	6	6^{4}	3
7	(Uruguay) P Cuevas	1	7^{7}	6

Semifinals
6	(Japan) K Nishikori	6	7
7	(Uruguay) P Cuevas	3	5

=== Bottom half ===
First round
5	(Germany) B Becker	6^{5}	4
Q	(Croatia) I Karlović	7^{7}	6
(Germany) M Zverev	6^{1}	2
(Russia) I Kunitsyn	7^{7}	6
WC	(United States) R Harrison	4	3
(Argentina) H Zeballos	6	6
8	(Bulgaria) G Dimitrov	6	6
(Germany) R Schüttler	0	2
(Russia) T Gabashvili	6	7^{7}
Q	(Chile) P Capdeville	4	6^{4}
Q	(United States) T Smyczek	2	2
WC	(United States) R Sweeting	6	6

Second round
Q	(Croatia) I Karlović	6	6
(Russia) I Kunitsyn	4	1
(Argentina) H Zeballos	5	3
4	(United States) J Isner	7	6
8	(Bulgaria) G Dimitrov	6^{4}	3
(Russia) T Gabashvili	7^{7}	6
WC	(United States) R Sweeting	3	7^{7}	6
2	(United States) S Querrey	6	6^{5}	3

Quarterfinals
Q	(Croatia) I Karlović	7^{7}	6^{2}	7^{11}
4	(United States) J Isner	6^{2}	7^{7}	6^{9}
(Russia) T Gabashvili	6	3	1
WC	(United States) R Sweeting	3	6	6

Semifinals
Q	(Croatia) I Karlović	6^{3}	3
WC	(United States) R Sweeting	7^{7}	6
