= 2011 U.S. Men's Clay Court Championships – Doubles =

Doubles
- 2011 U.S. Men's Clay Court Championships

Final
- Champions: (United States) Bob Bryan (United States) Mike Bryan
- Runners-up: (United States) John Isner (United States) Sam Querrey
- Score: 6–7^{(4–7)}, 6–2, [10–5]

Details
- Draw: 16
- Seeds: 4

Events
Singles	Doubles
- U.S. Men's Clay Court Championships

Two-time defending champions Bob Bryan and Mike Bryan defeated John Isner and Sam Querrey in the final, 6–7^{(4–7)}, 6–2, [10–5] to win the doubles tennis title at the 2011 U.S. Men's Clay Court Championships.

== Seeds ==
1. (United States) Bob Bryan / (United States) Mike Bryan (champions)
2. (United States) Eric Butorac / (Curaçao) Jean-Julien Rojer (semifinals)
3. (United States) Scott Lipsky / (United States) Rajeev Ram (first round)
4. (Brazil) Franco Ferreiro / (Brazil) André Sá (first round)

== Draw ==
Key

- Q = Qualifier
- WC = Wild card
- LL = Lucky loser
- Alt = Alternate
- ITF = ITF entry
- PR = Protected ranking
- SR = Special ranking
- SE = Special exempt
- JE = Junior exempt
- JR = Junior Accelerator Programme entrant
- CO = College Accelerator Programme entrant
- NG = Next Gen Accelerator Program entrant
- w/o = Walkover
- r = Retired
- d = Defaulted

=== Draw ===
First round
1	(United States) B Bryan (United States) M Bryan	6	6
(United States) J Cerretani (Canada) A Shamasdin	0	2
(Mexico) S González (Brazil) R Mello	7^{7}	6
(Israel) J Erlich (Germany) R Schüttler	6^{4}	3
3	(United States) S Lipsky (United States) R Ram	3	3
(Uruguay) P Cuevas (Spain) G García-López	6	6
WC	(United States) R Harrison (United States) R Sweeting	1	1
(United States) T Rettenmaier (Argentina) H Zeballos	6	6
(Germany) B Becker (Russia) I Kunitsyn	1	6^{2}
(United States) J Isner (United States) S Querrey	6	7^{7}
WC	(United States) D Kudla (United States) D Young	6	6
4	(Brazil) F Ferreiro (Brazil) A Sá	4	3
(Argentina) C Berlocq (Russia) T Gabashvili	7	6
(United Kingdom) J Murray (Germany) M Zverev	5	0
(Australia) A Fisher (Australia) S Huss	5	6^{4}
2	(United States) E Butorac (Curaçao) J-J Rojer	7	7^{7}

Quarterfinals
1	(United States) B Bryan (United States) M Bryan	6	6
(Mexico) S González (Brazil) R Mello	3	4
(Uruguay) P Cuevas (Spain) G García-López	3	6	[10]
(United States) T Rettenmaier (Argentina) H Zeballos	6	3	[4]
(United States) J Isner (United States) S Querrey	7^{7}	6
WC	(United States) D Kudla (United States) D Young	6^{5}	1
(Argentina) C Berlocq (Russia) T Gabashvili	6^{5}	4
2	(United States) E Butorac (Curaçao) J-J Rojer	7^{7}	6

Semifinals
1	(United States) B Bryan (United States) M Bryan	7	6
(Uruguay) P Cuevas (Spain) G García-López	5	1
(United States) J Isner (United States) S Querrey	6	6
2	(United States) E Butorac (Curaçao) J-J Rojer	4	3

Final
1	(United States) B Bryan (United States) M Bryan	6^{4}	6	[10]
(United States) J Isner (United States) S Querrey	7^{7}	2	[5]
