= 2011 U.S. Men's Clay Court Championships =

- Date: April 4–10
- Edition: 43rd
- Category: World Tour 250
- Draw: 32S / 16D
- Prize money: $442,500
- Surface: Clay / outdoor
- Location: Houston, TX, United States
- Venue: River Oaks Country Club

Champions

Singles
- (United States) Ryan Sweeting

Doubles
- (United States) Bob Bryan / (United States) Mike Bryan
← 2010 ·	U.S. Men's Clay Court Championships	· 2012 →

The 2011 U.S. Men's Clay Court Championships was a men's tennis tournament played on outdoor clay courts. It was the 43rd edition of the U.S. Men's Clay Court Championships, and was an ATP World Tour 250 event. It took place at River Oaks Country Club in Houston, Texas, United States, from April 4 through April 10, 2011. Unseeded Ryan Sweeting, who entered the main draw on a wildcard, won the singles title.

== Finals ==
=== Singles ===
(United States) Ryan Sweeting defeated (Japan) Kei Nishikori, 6–4, 7–6^{(7–3)}

- It was Sweeting's only singles title of his career.

=== Doubles ===
(United States) Bob Bryan / (United States) Mike Bryan defeated (United States) John Isner / (United States) Sam Querrey, 6–7^{(4–7)}, 6–2, [10–5]

== Entrants ==
=== Seeds ===
Country	Player	Rank^{1}	Seed
USA	Mardy Fish	15	1
USA	Sam Querrey	21	2
ESP	Guillermo García-López	26	3
USA	John Isner	33	4
GER	Benjamin Becker	58	5
JPN	Kei Nishikori	62	6
URU	Pablo Cuevas	67	7
BUL	Grigor Dimitrov	70	8

- Rankings and seedings are as of March 21, 2011.

=== Other entrants ===
The following players received wildcards into the main draw:

- (United States) James Blake
- (United States) Ryan Harrison
- (United States) Ryan Sweeting

The following players received entry via qualifying:

- (Croatia) Franko Škugor
- (Croatia) Ivo Karlović
- (United States) Tim Smyczek
- (Chile) Paul Capdeville

=== Withdrawals ===
- (South Africa) Kevin Anderson
- (Argentina) Juan Ignacio Chela (personal reasons)
- (Australia) Lleyton Hewitt (foot surgery)
- (Uzbekistan) Denis Istomin
