= 2009 Proton Malaysian Open – Singles =

Singles
- 2009 Proton Malaysian Open

Final
- Champion: (Russia) Nikolay Davydenko
- Runner-up: (Spain) Fernando Verdasco
- Score: 6–4, 7–5

Details
- Draw: 28
- Seeds: 8

Events
Singles	Doubles
Proton Malaysian Open	· 2010 →

Nikolay Davydenko won in the final 6–4, 7–5, against Fernando Verdasco.

== Seeds ==
The top four seeds receive a bye into the second round.

1. (Russia) Nikolay Davydenko (champion)
2. (Spain) Fernando Verdasco (final)
3. (Sweden) Robin Söderling (semifinals)
4. (Chile) Fernando González (semifinals)
5. (France) Gaël Monfils (quarterfinals)
6. (Czech Republic) Tomáš Berdych (quarterfinals)
7. (Spain) David Ferrer (first round)
8. (Australia) Lleyton Hewitt (first round)

== Draw ==
=== Key ===
- Q = Qualifier
- WC = Wild card
- LL = Lucky loser
- Alt = Alternate
- SE = Special exempt
- PR = Protected ranking
- ITF = ITF entry
- JE = Junior exempt
- w/o = Walkover
- r = Retired
- d = Defaulted
- SR = Special ranking

=== Finals ===
Semifinals
1	(Russia) Nikolay Davydenko	1	7^{7}	6
3	(Sweden) Robin Söderling	6	6^{1}	2
4	(Chile) Fernando González	4	5
2	(Spain) Fernando Verdasco	6	7

Final
1	(Russia) Nikolay Davydenko	6	7
2	(Spain) Fernando Verdasco	4	5

=== Top half ===
First round
(Kazakhstan) A Golubev	6	3	6^{4}
WC	(United States) T Dent	4	6	7^{7}
(Spain) F López	3	3
(Argentina) M Vassallo Argüello	6	6
(Uzbekistan) D Istomin	6^{3}	6^{2}
5	(France) G Monfils	7^{7}	7^{7}
Q	(United States) M Yani	3	4
Q	(United States) B Evans	6	6
(Germany) S Greul	6	3	6
(Belgium) C Rochus	4	6	2
(Russia) I Kunitsyn	1	6	2
6	(Czech Republic) T Berdych	6	3	6

Second round
1	(Russia) N Davydenko	6	7^{7}
WC	(United States) T Dent	3	6^{4}
(Argentina) M Vassallo Argüello	4	2
5	(France) G Monfils	6	6
3	(Sweden) R Söderling	6	6
Q	(United States) B Evans	1	1
(Germany) S Greul	3	6	3
6	(Czech Republic) T Berdych	6	4	6

Quarterfinals
1	(Russia) N Davydenko	6	6
5	(France) G Monfils	3	3
3	(Sweden) R Söderling	6	6
6	(Czech Republic) T Berdych	2	2

Semifinals
1	(Russia) N Davydenko	1	7^{7}	6
3	(Sweden) R Söderling	6	6^{1}	2

=== Bottom half ===
First round
7	(Spain) D Ferrer	6^{3}	2
(Russia) M Youzhny	7^{7}	6
(Chinese Taipei) Y-H Lu	6	3	6^{5}
WC	(Cyprus) M Baghdatis	4	6	7^{7}
(Argentina) J Acasuso	6	3	4
Q	(India) R Bopanna	4	6	6
8	(Australia) L Hewitt	6^{7}	3
WC	(Sweden) J Johansson	7^{9}	6
(France) R Gasquet	6	6
(Romania) V Crivoi	1	2
Q	(Kazakhstan) M Kukushkin	6	6^{4}	3
(Slovakia) K Beck	1	7^{7}	6

Second round
(Russia) M Youzhny	6	6
WC	(Cyprus) M Baghdatis	2	3
Q	(India) R Bopanna	4	6	4
4	(Chile) F González	6	3	6
WC	(Sweden) J Johansson	6	6^{1}	2
(France) R Gasquet	4	7^{7}	6
(Slovakia) K Beck	4	0
2	(Spain) F Verdasco	6	6

Quarterfinals
(Russia) M Youzhny	3	4
4	(Chile) F González	6	6
(France) R Gasquet	5	4
2	(Spain) F Verdasco	7	6

Semifinals
4	(Chile) F González	4	5
2	(Spain) F Verdasco	6	7
