= 2011 Proton Malaysian Open – Singles Qualifying =

This article displays the qualifying draw of the 2011 Proton Malaysian Open.

== Players ==
=== Seeds ===
1. (Russia) Teymuraz Gabashvili (qualified)
2. (Japan) Tatsuma Ito (qualifying competition)
3. (South Africa) Rik de Voest (qualified)
4. (Australia) Marinko Matosevic (qualified)
5. (Japan) Yuichi Sugita (second round)
6. (United States) Michael Yani (qualifying competition)
7. (United States) Rajeev Ram (qualifying competition)
8. (Italy) Riccardo Ghedin (second round)

=== Qualifiers ===
1. (Russia) Teymuraz Gabashvili
2. (Russia) Mikhail Ledovskikh
3. (South Africa) Rik de Voest
4. (Australia) Marinko Matosevic

== Qualifying draw ==
=== First qualifier ===
First Round				Second Round				Qualifying Competition
				1	(Russia) Teymuraz Gabashvili	6	6
WC	(Malaysia) Wan Abdul Aziz	1	0		(Bulgaria) Alexander Lazov	1	1
	(Bulgaria) Alexander Lazov	6	6					1	(Russia) Teymuraz Gabashvili	6	6
	(China) Zhang Ze	6	6						(China) Zhang Ze	2	4
	(Malaysia) Ariez Deen Heshaam	4	0		(China) Zhang Ze	6	6
				5	(Japan) Yuichi Sugita	3	4

=== Second qualifier ===
First Round			Second Round				Qualifying Competition
			2	(Japan) Tatsuma Ito	7^{7}	6
(Japan) Koki Matsunaga	3	5		(Monaco) Jean-René Lisnard	6^{5}	2
(Monaco) Jean-René Lisnard	6	7					2	(Japan) Tatsuma Ito	7^{7}	2	6^{6}
(Russia) Mikhail Ledovskikh	6	7						(Russia) Mikhail Ledovskikh	6^{5}	6	7^{8}
(China) Gong Maoxin	4	5		(Russia) Mikhail Ledovskikh	6	6
			8	(Italy) Riccardo Ghedin	4	4

=== Third qualifier ===
First Round				Second Round					Qualifying Competition
				3	(South Africa) Rik de Voest	6	5	6
	(United States) Scott Lipsky	6^{6}	3		(Chinese Taipei) Chen Ti	2	7	4
	(Chinese Taipei) Chen Ti	7^{8}	6						3	(South Africa) Rik de Voest	7^{7}	6
WC	(Malaysia) Ahmed Abdul Razak	1	2						6	(United States) Michael Yani	6^{3}	4
	(Chinese Taipei) Wang Yeu-tzuoo	6	6		(Chinese Taipei) Wang Yeu-tzuoo	6	3	4
				6	(United States) Michael Yani	3	6	6

=== Fourth qualifier ===
First Round					Second Round					Qualifying Competition
					4	(Australia) Marinko Matosevic	6	7^{9}
WC	(Malaysia) Si Yew Ming	4	2			(Ukraine) Stanislav Poplavskyy	2	6^{7}
	(Ukraine) Stanislav Poplavskyy	6	6							4	(Australia) Marinko Matosevic	6	6
	(Russia) Michail Elgin	6	6^{4}	7^{7}						7	(United States) Rajeev Ram	3	4
	(Curaçao) Jean-Julien Rojer	4	7^{7}	6^{5}		(Russia) Michail Elgin	1	6	3
					7	(United States) Rajeev Ram	6	4	6
