= 2009 Proton Malaysian Open =

- Date: 26 September – 4 October
- Edition: 1st
- Category: World Tour 250 Series
- Draw: 28S / 16D
- Prize money: $850,000
- Surface: Hard / indoor
- Location: Kuala Lumpur, Malaysia
- Venue: Bukit Jalil Sports Complex

Champions

Singles
- (Russia) Nikolay Davydenko

Doubles
- (Poland) Mariusz Fyrstenberg / (Poland) Marcin Matkowski
- Proton Malaysian Open

The 2009 Malaysian Open (also known as the 2009 Proton Malaysian Open for sponsorship reasons) was a men's tennis tournament played on indoor hard courts. It was the 1st edition of the Malaysian Open, and was classified as an ATP World Tour 250 series of the 2009 ATP World Tour. It was played at the Bukit Jalil Sports Complex in Kuala Lumpur, Malaysia. The inaugural edition was scheduled to take place from 26 September to 4 October 2009.

== Entrants ==
=== Seeds ===
| Country | Player | Rank^{1} | Seed |
|---|---|---|---|
| RUS | Nikolay Davydenko | 8 | 1 |
| ESP | Fernando Verdasco | 9 | 2 |
| SWE | Robin Söderling | 11 | 3 |
| CHI | Fernando González | 12 | 4 |
| FRA | Gaël Monfils | 13 | 5 |
| CZE | Tomáš Berdych | 16 | 6 |
| ESP | David Ferrer | 19 | 7 |
| AUS | Lleyton Hewitt | 26 | 8 |

- Seeds are based on the rankings of 21 September 2009

=== Other entrants ===
The following players received wildcards into the singles main draw

- (Sweden) Joachim Johansson
- (United States) Taylor Dent
- (Cyprus) Marcos Baghdatis

The following players received entry from the qualifying draw:

- (United States) Brendan Evans
- (Kazakhstan) Mikhail Kukushkin
- (United States) Michael Yani
- (India) Rohan Bopanna

== Finals ==
=== Singles ===
(Russia) Nikolay Davydenko defeated (Spain) Fernando Verdasco, 6–4, 7–5.

- It was Davydenko's third title of the year and 17th of his career.

=== Doubles ===
(Poland) Mariusz Fyrstenberg / (Poland) Marcin Matkowski defeated (Russia) Igor Kunitsyn / (Czech Republic) Jaroslav Levinský, 6–2, 6–1.
