= 2010 Proton Malaysian Open – Singles =

Singles
- 2010 Proton Malaysian Open

Final
- Champion: (Russia) Mikhail Youzhny
- Runner-up: (Kazakhstan) Andrey Golubev
- Score: 6–7^{(7–9)}, 6–2, 7–6^{(7–3)}

Events
Singles	Doubles
← 2009 ·	Proton Malaysian Open	· 2011 →

Nikolay Davydenko was the defending champion but lost in the second round, 7–6^{(7–5)}, 5–7, 6–3, against fellow Russian and qualifier Igor Andreev.
In the end, it was another Russian, Mikhail Youzhny, who won in the final, 6–7^{(7–9)}, 6–2, 7–6^{(7–3)}, against Andrey Golubev from Kazakhstan.

== Seeds ==
The top four seeds receive a bye into the second round.

1. (Sweden) Robin Söderling (quarterfinals)
2. (Russia) Nikolay Davydenko (second round)
3. (Czech Republic) Tomáš Berdych (quarterfinals)
4. (Russia) Mikhail Youzhny (champion)
5. (Spain) David Ferrer (semifinals)
6. (Cyprus) Marcos Baghdatis (quarterfinals)
7. (Ukraine) Sergiy Stakhovsky (second round)
8. (Kazakhstan) Andrey Golubev (final)

== Draw ==
=== Key ===
- Q = Qualifier
- WC = Wild card
- LL = Lucky loser
- Alt = Alternate
- SE = Special exempt
- PR = Protected ranking
- ITF = ITF entry
- JE = Junior exempt
- w/o = Walkover
- r = Retired
- d = Defaulted
- SR = Special ranking

=== Finals ===
Semifinals
8	(Kazakhstan) Andrey Golubev	7	7^{7}
5	(Spain) David Ferrer	5	6^{4}
4	(Russia) Mikhail Youzhny	3	6	6
Q	(Russia) Igor Andreev	6	0	2

Final
8	(Kazakhstan) Andrey Golubev	7^{9}	2	6^{3}
4	(Russia) Mikhail Youzhny	6^{7}	6	7^{7}

=== Top half ===
First round
Q	(Czech Republic) F Čermák	0	4
(France) É Roger-Vasselin	6	6
(Colombia) A Falla	1	6	5
(South Africa) K Anderson	6	3	7
(Chinese Taipei) Y-h Lu	5	2
8	(Kazakhstan) A Golubev	7	6
(Turkey) M İlhan	6	3	4
(Uzbekistan) D Istomin	2	6	6
WC	(Malaysia) YM Si	2	0
WC	(India) Y Bhambri	6	6
WC	(Australia) B Tomic	3	4
5	(Spain) D Ferrer	6	6

Second round
1	(Sweden) R Söderling	6	6
(France) É Roger-Vasselin	0	1
(South Africa) K Anderson	4	6^{4}
8	(Kazakhstan) A Golubev	6	7^{7}
3	(Czech Republic) T Berdych	6	6
(Uzbekistan) D Istomin	4	3
WC	(India) Y Bhambri	2	2
5	(Spain) D Ferrer	6	6

Quarterfinals
1	(Sweden) R Söderling	3	2
8	(Kazakhstan) A Golubev	6	6
3	(Czech Republic) T Berdych	6	5	4
5	(Spain) D Ferrer	4	7	6

Semifinals
8	(Kazakhstan) A Golubev	7	7^{7}
5	(Spain) D Ferrer	5	6^{4}

=== Bottom half ===
First round
6	(Cyprus) M Baghdatis	6	6
(Japan) K Nishikori	1	1
(Poland) M Przysiężny	6^{8}	1
(Colombia) S Giraldo	7^{10}	6
(Ukraine) A Dolgopolov	6	6
Q	(France) L Recourderc	3	1
7	(Ukraine) S Stakhovsky	2	7^{7}	6
(United States) M Russell	6	6^{4}	3
(Russia) I Kunitsyn	6^{6}	3
Q	(Canada) M Raonic	7^{8}	6
(Japan) G Soeda	1	4
Q	(Russia) I Andreev	6	6

Second round
6	(Cyprus) M Baghdatis	7	7
(Colombia) S Giraldo	5	5
(Ukraine) A Dolgopolov	1	7	5
4	(Russia) M Youzhny	6	5	7
7	(Ukraine) S Stakhovsky	7^{10}	6^{9}	3
Q	(Canada) M Raonic	6^{8}	7^{11}	6
Q	(Russia) I Andreev	7^{7}	5	6
2	(Russia) N Davydenko	6^{5}	7	3

Quarterfinals
6	(Cyprus) M Baghdatis	7^{7}	5	1
4	(Russia) M Youzhny	6^{5}	7	6
Q	(Canada) M Raonic	1	6	3
Q	(Russia) I Andreev	6	3	6

Semifinals
4	(Russia) M Youzhny	3	6	6
Q	(Russia) I Andreev	6	0	2
