= 2009 Proton Malaysian Open – Doubles =

Doubles
- 2009 Proton Malaysian Open

Final
- Champion: (Poland) Mariusz Fyrstenberg (Poland) Marcin Matkowski
- Runner-up: (Russia) Igor Kunitsyn (Czech Republic) Jaroslav Levinský
- Score: 6–2, 6–1

Events
Singles	Doubles
Proton Malaysian Open	· 2010 →

The following are the results of the 2009 Proton Malaysian Open doubles:

Mariusz Fyrstenberg and Marcin Matkowski won in the final 6–2, 6–1 against Igor Kunitsyn and Jaroslav Levinský.

== Seeds ==
1. (Poland) Mariusz Fyrstenberg / (Poland) Marcin Matkowski (champions)
2. (Czech Republic) František Čermák / (Slovakia) Michal Mertiňák (first round)
3. (Czech Republic) Martin Damm / (Sweden) Robert Lindstedt (semifinals)
4. (Sweden) Simon Aspelin / (Australia) Paul Hanley (first round)

== Draw ==
=== Key ===
- Q = Qualifier
- WC = Wild card
- LL = Lucky loser
- Alt = Alternate
- SE = Special exempt
- PR = Protected ranking
- ITF = ITF entry
- JE = Junior exempt
- w/o = Walkover
- r = Retired
- d = Defaulted
- SR = Special ranking

=== Finals ===
First round
1	(Poland) M Fyrstenberg (Poland) M Matkowski	7	7
(United States) J Cerretani (Netherlands) R Wassen	5	5
(Kazakhstan) A Golubev (Uzbekistan) D Istomin	6	6
(Argentina) J Acasuso (Chile) F González	3	1
3	(Czech Republic) M Damm (Sweden) R Lindstedt	7^{8}	6
(Sweden) J Brunström (Netherlands Antilles) J-J Rojer	6^{6}	4
(Brazil) M Melo (Brazil) A Sá	6	5	[10]
WC	(Sweden) J Johansson (Malaysia) YM Si	1	7	[3]
(Slovakia) K Beck (Australia) J Kerr	2	4
(Russia) I Kunitsyn (Czech Republic) J Levinský	6	6
WC	(India) R Bopanna (Pakistan) A-u-H Qureshi	6	6
4	(Sweden) S Aspelin (Australia) P Hanley	3	4
(Belgium) C Rochus (Argentina) M Vassallo Argüello	4	3
(Australia) S Huss (United States) S Lipsky	6	6
(Russia) M Elgin (Germany) F Moser	6	4	[10]
2	(Czech Republic) F Čermák (Slovakia) M Mertiňák	4	6	[8]

Quarterfinals
1	(Poland) M Fyrstenberg (Poland) M Matkowski	5	6	[10]
(Kazakhstan) A Golubev (Uzbekistan) D Istomin	7	4	[1]
3	(Czech Republic) M Damm (Sweden) R Lindstedt	6	6
(Brazil) M Melo (Brazil) A Sá	4	2
(Russia) I Kunitsyn (Czech Republic) J Levinský	2	7^{7}	[13]
WC	(India) R Bopanna (Pakistan) A-u-H Qureshi	6	6^{4}	[11]
(Australia) S Huss (United States) S Lipsky	6	6
(Russia) M Elgin (Germany) F Moser	3	2

Semifinals
1	(Poland) M Fyrstenberg (Poland) M Matkowski	6	6^{4}	[10]
3	(Czech Republic) M Damm (Sweden) R Lindstedt	3	7^{7}	[4]
(Russia) I Kunitsyn (Czech Republic) J Levinský	3	7^{7}	[10]
(Australia) S Huss (United States) S Lipsky	6	6^{5}	[3]

Finals
1	(Poland) M Fyrstenberg (Poland) M Matkowski	6	6
(Russia) I Kunitsyn (Czech Republic) J Levinský	2	1
