= 2010 Proton Malaysian Open =

- Date: 27 September – 3 October
- Edition: 2nd
- Category: ATP World Tour 250 Series
- Draw: 28S / 16D
- Prize money: $850,000
- Location: Kuala Lumpur, Malaysia

Champions

Singles
- (Russia) Mikhail Youzhny

Doubles
- (Czech Republic) František Čermák / (Slovakia) Michal Mertiňák
- Proton Malaysian Open

The 2010 Malaysian Open (also known as the 2010 Proton Malaysian Open for sponsorship reasons) was a tennis tournament played on indoor hard courts. It was the second edition of the Proton Malaysian Open, and was classified as an ATP World Tour 250 Series of the 2010 ATP World Tour. It took place at the Bukit Jalil Sports Complex in Kuala Lumpur, Malaysia.

== Entrants ==
=== Seeds ===
Country	Player	Rank^{1}	Seed
SWE	Robin Söderling	5	1
RUS	Nikolay Davydenko	6	2
CZE	Tomáš Berdych	7	3
RUS	Mikhail Youzhny	9	4
ESP	David Ferrer	10	5
CYP	Marcos Baghdatis	18	6
UKR	Sergiy Stakhovsky	32	7
KAZ	Andrey Golubev	39	8

- Seeds are based on the rankings of 20 September 2010.

=== Other entrants ===
The following players received wildcards into the singles main draw

- (India) Yuki Bhambri
- (Malaysia) Si Yew Ming
- (Australia) Bernard Tomic

The following players received entry from the qualifying draw:

- (Russia) Igor Andreev
- (Czech Republic) František Čermák
- (Canada) Milos Raonic
- (France) Laurent Recouderc

== Finals ==
=== Singles ===
(Russia) Mikhail Youzhny defeated (Kazakhstan) Andrey Golubev, 6–7^{(7–9)}, 6–2, 7–6^{(7–3)}

- It was Youzhny's second title of the year, and the seventh of his career.

=== Doubles ===
(Czech Republic) František Čermák / (Slovakia) Michal Mertiňák defeated (Poland) Mariusz Fyrstenberg / (Poland) Marcin Matkowski, 7–6^{(7–3)}, 7–6^{(7–5)}
