= 2011 Proton Malaysian Open – Doubles =

Doubles
- 2011 Proton Malaysian Open

Final
- Champions: (United States) Eric Butorac (Curaçao) Jean-Julien Rojer
- Runners-up: (Czech Republic) František Čermák (Slovakia) Filip Polášek
- Score: 6–1, 6–3

Events
Singles	Doubles
← 2010 ·	Proton Malaysian Open	· 2012 →

František Čermák and Michal Mertiňák were the defending champions but Mertiňák decided not to participate.

Čermák played alongside Filip Polášek and they reached the final, where Eric Butorac and Jean-Julien Rojer defeated them to win the title.

== Seeds ==
1. (Austria) Jürgen Melzer / (Germany) Philipp Petzschner (semifinals)
2. (United States) Eric Butorac / (Curaçao) Jean-Julien Rojer (champions)
3. (Czech Republic) František Čermák / (Slovakia) Filip Polášek (final)
4. (United States) Scott Lipsky / (United States) Rajeev Ram (semifinals)

== Draw ==
=== Key ===
- Q = Qualifier
- WC = Wild card
- LL = Lucky loser
- Alt = Alternate
- SE = Special exempt
- PR = Protected ranking
- ITF = ITF entry
- JE = Junior exempt
- w/o = Walkover
- r = Retired
- d = Defaulted
- SR = Special ranking

== Draw ==
First round
1	(Austria) J Melzer (Germany) P Petzschner	7^{7}	6
(Russia) M Elgin (Kazakhstan) M Kukushkin	6^{5}	2
(United States) A Bogomolov Jr. (Czech Republic) L Rosol	2	3
(United Kingdom) C Fleming (United Kingdom) R Hutchins	6	6
3	(Czech Republic) F Čermák (Slovakia) F Polášek	6	6
WC	(Malaysia) A Razak (Malaysia) A Heshaam	2	2
(Germany) M Emmrich (Sweden) A Siljeström	7	3	[10]
(Canada) A Shamasdin (Slovakia) I Zelenay	5	6	[7]
(Poland) Ł Kubot (Russia) D Tursunov	3	2
(Australia) M Ebden (Australia) B Tomic	6	6
(Chile) P Capdeville (United States) R Sweeting	3	2
4	(United States) S Lipsky (United States) R Ram	6	6
(Russia) N Davydenko (Russia) T Gabashvili	4	6^{5}
(Czech Republic) L Dlouhý (Brazil) M Melo	6	7^{7}
WC	(United States) R Harrison (Malaysia) YM Si	4	5
2	(United States) E Butorac (Curaçao) J-J Rojer	6	7

Quarterfinals
1	(Austria) J Melzer (Germany) P Petzschner	6	6
(United Kingdom) C Fleming (United Kingdom) R Hutchins	3	3
3	(Czech Republic) F Čermák (Slovakia) F Polášek	6	3	[10]
(Germany) M Emmrich (Sweden) A Siljeström	4	6	[7]
(Australia) M Ebden (Australia) B Tomic	2	3
4	(United States) S Lipsky (United States) R Ram	6	6
(Czech Republic) L Dlouhý (Brazil) M Melo	4	6	[3]
2	(United States) E Butorac (Curaçao) J-J Rojer	6	4	[10]

Semifinals
1	(Austria) J Melzer (Germany) P Petzschner	6^{7}	4
3	(Czech Republic) F Čermák (Slovakia) F Polášek	7^{9}	6
4	(United States) S Lipsky (United States) R Ram	3	7^{7}	[6]
2	(United States) E Butorac (Curaçao) J-J Rojer	6	6^{5}	[10]

Final
3	(Czech Republic) F Čermák (Slovakia) F Polášek	1	3
2	(United States) E Butorac (Curaçao) J-J Rojer	6	6
