= 2011 Proton Malaysian Open =

- Date: 26 September – 2 October
- Edition: 3rd
- Category: ATP World Tour 250 Series
- Draw: 28S / 16D
- Prize money: $850,000
- Location: Kuala Lumpur, Malaysia

Champions

Singles
- (Serbia) Janko Tipsarević

Doubles
- (United States) Eric Butorac / (Curaçao) Jean-Julien Rojer
| ← 2010 · | Proton Malaysian Open | · 2012 → |

The 2011 Malaysian Open (also known as the 2011 Proton Malaysian Open' for sponsorship reasons) was a men's tennis tournament played on indoor hard courts. It was the third edition of the Proton Malaysian Open, and was classified as an ATP World Tour 250 Series of the 2011 ATP World Tour. It took place at the Bukit Jalil Sports Complex in Kuala Lumpur, Malaysia. Janko Tipsarević won the singles title.

== Finals ==
=== Singles ===
(Serbia) Janko Tipsarević defeated (Cyprus) Marcos Baghdatis, 6–4, 7–5

- It was Tipsarevic's 1st career title.

=== Doubles ===
(United States) Eric Butorac / (Curaçao) Jean-Julien Rojer defeated (Czech Republic) František Čermák / (Slovakia) Filip Polášek, 6–1, 6–3

== Entrants ==
=== Seeds ===
| Country | Player | Rank | Seed |
|---|---|---|---|
| ESP | Nicolás Almagro | 12 | 1 |
| SRB | Viktor Troicki | 16 | 2 |
| SRB | Janko Tipsarević | 17 | 3 |
| AUT | Jürgen Melzer | 21 | 4 |
| RUS | Nikolay Davydenko | 36 | 5 |
| USA | Alex Bogomolov Jr. | 40 | 6 |
| RUS | Dmitry Tursunov | 41 | 7 |
| JPN | Kei Nishikori | 54 | 8 |

- Seeds are based on the rankings of 19 September 2011.

=== Other entrants ===
The following players received wildcards into the singles main draw

- (Cyprus) Marcos Baghdatis
- (Australia) Matthew Ebden
- (Belgium) David Goffin

The following players received entry from the qualifying draw:

- (South Africa) Rik de Voest
- (Russia) Teymuraz Gabashvili
- (Russia) Mikhail Ledovskikh
- (Australia) Marinko Matosevic
