= 2011 Proton Malaysian Open – Singles =

Singles
- 2011 Proton Malaysian Open

Final
- Champion: (Serbia) Janko Tipsarević
- Runner-up: (Cyprus) Marcos Baghdatis
- Score: 6–4, 7–5

Details
- Draw: 28
- Seeds: 8

Events
Singles	Doubles
← 2010 ·	Proton Malaysian Open	· 2012 →

Mikhail Youzhny was the defending champion but decided not to participate.

3rd seed Janko Tipsarević defeated Marcos Baghdatis 6–4, 7–5 to win his first ATP title in his fifth attempt.

== Seeds ==
The top four seeds received a bye into the second round.

1. (Spain) Nicolás Almagro (quarterfinals)
2. (Serbia) Viktor Troicki (semifinals)
3. (Serbia) Janko Tipsarević (champion)
4. (Austria) Jürgen Melzer (quarterfinals)
5. (Russia) Nikolay Davydenko (quarterfinals, retired)
6. (United States) Alex Bogomolov Jr. (first round)
7. (Russia) Dmitry Tursunov (quarterfinals)
8. (Japan) Kei Nishikori (semifinals)

== Draw ==
=== Key ===
- Q = Qualifier
- WC = Wild card
- LL = Lucky loser
- Alt = Alternate
- SE = Special exempt
- PR = Protected ranking
- ITF = ITF entry
- JE = Junior exempt
- w/o = Walkover
- r = Retired
- d = Defaulted
- SR = Special ranking

=== Finals ===
Semifinals
8	(Japan) Kei Nishikori	4	3
3	(Serbia) Janko Tipsarević	6	6
WC	(Cyprus) Marcos Baghdatis	6	6
2	(Serbia) Viktor Troicki	3	1

Final
3	(Serbia) Janko Tipsarević	6	7
WC	(Cyprus) Marcos Baghdatis	4	5

=== Top half ===
First round
(Kazakhstan) M Kukushkin	6	3	2^{r}
(Spain) A Ramos	4	6	4
(Germany) M Zverev	5	3
(Germany) P Petzschner	7	6
Q	(Russia) T Gabashvili	6	4	1
8	(Japan) K Nishikori	3	6	6
(Australia) B Tomic	2	2
(Italy) F Cipolla	6	6
(Poland) Ł Kubot	6	6
(Czech Republic) L Rosol	3	3
(United States) R Harrison	3	2
5	(Russia) N Davydenko	6	6

Second round
1	(Spain) N Almagro	7^{7}	7^{7}
(Spain) A Ramos	6^{2}	6^{4}
(Germany) P Petzschner	3	6	5
8	(Japan) K Nishikori	6	4	7
3	(Serbia) J Tipsarević	6	6
(Italy) F Cipolla	2	4
(Poland) Ł Kubot	3	6^{2}
5	(Russia) N Davydenko	6	7^{7}

Quarterfinals
1	(Spain) N Almagro	7^{7}	4	4
8	(Japan) K Nishikori	6^{5}	6	6
3	(Serbia) J Tipsarević	3
5	(Russia) N Davydenko	1	r

Semifinals
8	(Japan) K Nishikori	4	3
3	(Serbia) J Tipsarević	6	6

=== Bottom half ===
First round
6	(United States) A Bogomolov Jr.	6^{3}	4
WC	(Cyprus) M Baghdatis	7^{7}	6
Q	(Russia) M Ledovskikh	6^{5}	4
(India) S Devvarman	7^{7}	6
Q	(South Africa) R de Voest	4	6	6
(United States) R Sweeting	6	3	3
7	(Russia) D Tursunov	6	2	6
(Chile) P Capdeville	2	6	1
WC	(Belgium) D Goffin	6	7^{7}
WC	(Australia) M Ebden	4	6^{4}
(Uzbekistan) D Istomin	6	6
Q	(Australia) M Matosevic	3	2

Second round
WC	(Cyprus) M Baghdatis	7	6
(India) S Devvarman	5	4
Q	(South Africa) R de Voest	0	4
4	(Austria) J Melzer	6	6
7	(Russia) D Tursunov	6	6
WC	(Belgium) D Goffin	3	3
(Uzbekistan) D Istomin	1	4
2	(Serbia) V Troicki	6	6

Quarterfinals
WC	(Cyprus) M Baghdatis	6	7^{7}
4	(Austria) J Melzer	3	6^{3}
7	(Russia) D Tursunov	4	4
2	(Serbia) V Troicki	6	6

Semifinals
WC	(Cyprus) M Baghdatis	6	6
2	(Serbia) V Troicki	3	1
