= 2010 Proton Malaysian Open – Doubles =

Doubles
- 2010 Proton Malaysian Open

Final
- Champions: (Czech Republic) František Čermák (Slovakia) Michal Mertiňák
- Runners-up: (Poland) Mariusz Fyrstenberg (Poland) Marcin Matkowski
- Score: 7–6^{(7–3)}, 7–6^{(7–5)}

Events
Singles	Doubles
← 2009 ·	Proton Malaysian Open	· 2011 →

Mariusz Fyrstenberg and Marcin Matkowski were the defending champions. They reached the final, but lost to František Čermák and Michal Mertiňák 6–7^{(3–7)}, 6–7^{(5–7)}.

== Seeds ==
1. (Poland) Mariusz Fyrstenberg / (Poland) Marcin Matkowski (final)
2. (Czech Republic) František Čermák / (Slovakia) Michal Mertiňák (champions)
3. (Brazil) Marcelo Melo / (Brazil) Bruno Soares (quarterfinals)
4. (United States) Eric Butorac / (Netherlands Antilles) Jean-Julien Rojer (quarterfinals)

== Draw ==
=== Key ===
- Q = Qualifier
- WC = Wild card
- LL = Lucky loser
- Alt = Alternate
- SE = Special exempt
- PR = Protected ranking
- ITF = ITF entry
- JE = Junior exempt
- w/o = Walkover
- r = Retired
- d = Defaulted
- SR = Special ranking

=== Draw ===
First round
1	(Poland) M Fyrstenberg (Poland) M Matkowski	6	6
(Germany) F Moser (Czech Republic) D Škoch	1	4
(Sweden) J Brunström (United States) S Lipsky	6	1	[20]
(Mexico) S González (United States) T Rettenmaier	3	6	[18]
3	(Brazil) M Melo (Brazil) B Soares	w/o
WC	(India) Y Bhambri (Japan) K Nishikori
(Ukraine) S Stakhovsky (Russia) M Youzhny	6	7
(Australia) J Kerr (United States) T Parrott	4	5
(South Africa) K Anderson (United States) M Russell	4	6	[7]
(Kazakhstan) A Golubev (Uzbekistan) D Istomin	6	3	[10]
WC	(Russia) N Davydenko (Malaysia) NK Mahmood Khan	3	3
4	(United States) E Butorac (Netherlands Antilles) J-J Rojer	6	6
(Australia) S Huss (United Kingdom) R Hutchins	5	6	[10]
(Colombia) A Falla (Colombia) S Giraldo	7	1	[8]
(Poland) T Bednarek (Poland) M Przysiężny	3	2
2	(Czech Republic) F Čermák (Slovakia) M Mertiňák	6	6

Quarterfinals
1	(Poland) M Fyrstenberg (Poland) M Matkowski	7^{7}	6
(Sweden) J Brunström (United States) S Lipsky	6^{5}	4
3	(Brazil) M Melo (Brazil) B Soares	6	6^{4}	[5]
(Ukraine) S Stakhovsky (Russia) M Youzhny	4	7^{7}	[10]
(Kazakhstan) A Golubev (Uzbekistan) D Istomin	6^{5}	7^{7}	[10]
4	(United States) E Butorac (Netherlands Antilles) J-J Rojer	7^{7}	6^{3}	[5]
(Australia) S Huss (United Kingdom) R Hutchins	7	1	[5]
2	(Czech Republic) F Čermák (Slovakia) M Mertiňák	5	6	[10]

Semifinals
1	(Poland) M Fyrstenberg (Poland) M Matkowski	6	6
(Ukraine) S Stakhovsky (Russia) M Youzhny	0	1
(Kazakhstan) A Golubev (Uzbekistan) D Istomin	3	4
2	(Czech Republic) F Čermák (Slovakia) M Mertiňák	6	6

Finals
1	(Poland) M Fyrstenberg (Poland) M Matkowski	6^{3}	6^{5}
2	(Czech Republic) F Čermák (Slovakia) M Mertiňák	7^{7}	7^{7}
