= David Ferrer =

Spanish tennis player (born 1982)

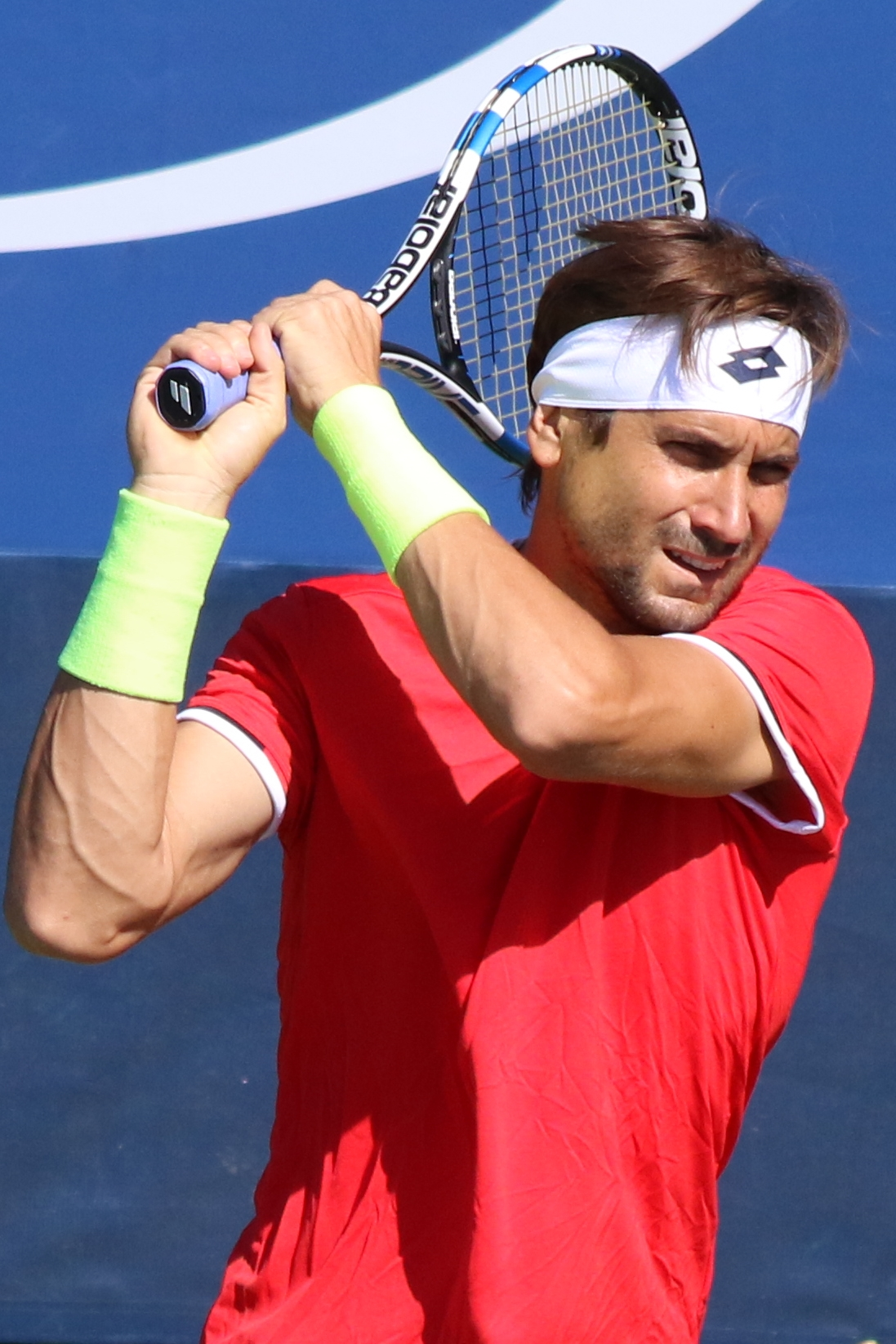
- Ferrer at the 2016 US Open
- Country (sports): Spain
- Residence: Valencia, Spain
- Born: 2 April 1982 (age 44) Xàbia, Alicante, Spain
- Height: 1.75 m (5 ft 9 in)
- Turned pro: 2000
- Retired: 2019
- Plays: Right-handed (two-handed backhand)
- Coach: Javier Piles (2000–2013); José Francisco Altur (2014); Francisco Fogués (2014–2019)
- Prize money: US$31,483,911: 16th all-time leader in earnings

Singles
- Career record: 734–377 (66.1%)
- Career titles: 27
- Highest ranking: No. 3 (8 July 2013)

Grand Slam singles results
- Australian Open: SF (2011, 2013)
- French Open: F (2013)
- Wimbledon: QF (2012, 2013)
- US Open: SF (2007, 2012)

Other tournaments
- Tour Finals: F (2007)
- Olympic Games: 3R (2012)

Doubles
- Career record: 77–113 (40.5%)
- Career titles: 2
- Highest ranking: No. 42 (24 October 2005)

Grand Slam doubles results
- Australian Open: 3R (2005)
- French Open: 2R (2009)
- Wimbledon: 1R (2003, 2004, 2005, 2006, 2009, 2018)
- US Open: 2R (2004, 2006)

Other doubles tournaments
- Olympic Games: SF – 4th (2012)

Team competitions
- Davis Cup: W (2008, 2009, 2011)
- Hopman Cup: RR (2019)

David Ferrer Ern (Valencian pronunciation: [daˈvit feˈreɾ ˈɛɾn]; Spanish: [daˈβið feˈreɾ ˈeɾn]; born 2 April 1982) is a Spanish former professional tennis player. He was ranked world No. 3 in men's singles by the Association of Tennis Professionals (ATP) in July 2013. Ferrer won 27 ATP Tour singles titles, including a Masters 1000 event at the 2012 Paris Masters. He was also the runner-up at the 2013 French Open, the 2007 Tennis Masters Cup, and six Masters events. A three-time Davis Cup champion with Spain (in 2008, 2009, and 2011), Ferrer has the thirteenth-highest career prize money earnings among male tennis players (not adjusting for inflation). With 734 career match wins, he holds the distinction of winning the most matches on the ATP Tour without having won a major; he is widely considered one of the best players not to have won a major.

Ferrer turned professional in 2000 and was regarded as a clay court specialist in his early career, winning 13 of his 27 titles on the surface. However, he had significant success on all surfaces, having reached the final of the 2013 French Open (without losing a set en route), the semifinals of the Australian and US Opens twice each, and the quarterfinals of Wimbledon twice. Ferrer retired in 2019, competing for the last time at his home tournament of the Madrid Open.

Since retiring, Ferrer has been involved in the development of Ferrer Tennis Academy in La Nucía, Spain, and has served as captain of the Spain Davis Cup team since 2023.

== Career ==
=== 1999–2001: Turning pro and first Challenger title ===
Ferrer was born in Xàbia in the province of Alicante, but he moved to Gandia at age thirteen, followed two years later by a move to Barcelona to attend the Catalan Tennis Federation.

Once, as a teenager, when Ferrer did not practice hard enough, his coach, Javier Piles, locked him in a completely dark 2m x 2m ball closet for several hours, giving him only a piece of bread and a bit of water. After this incident he was fed up with tennis and went to work at a construction site, but after a week he returned to Piles and asked if he could remain at the club and play tennis. Piles continued to coach Ferrer until they parted ways at the end of 2013. Ferrer has said he considers Piles to be like a second father to him.

Ferrer turned professional in 2000, finishing as world no. 419, winning in Poland F1 and Spain F3, finishing runner-up in Spain F1. 2001 was not a particularly good year for him. He won his first career Challenger title in Sopot and reached the semifinals at Manerbio. He also reached the semifinals in Spain F15 and Spain F16.

=== 2002–2003: First title, victory over world No.1 ===
In 2002, he played consistently in ATP (10–6) and Challenger (35–13) tournaments, winning his first ATP title in Bucharest (defeated José Acasuso) and reaching his first ATP final in just his second ATP event in Umag (defeated David Nalbandian and Guillermo Coria, lost to Carlos Moyá). He won Challenger titles in Naples, Valencia, and Sassuolo. All 10 ATP match wins and 34 of 35 Challenger wins came on clay.

The highlight of 2003 was Ferrer's victory against Andre Agassi at the Rome Masters. He made his debut at all four Grand Slam tournaments, as well as six ATP Masters Series events. In Rome, he upset the defending champion Agassi in the first round and lost to Ivan Ljubičić in the second round. Ferrer advanced to the second round at the French Open and Wimbledon. He reached his third career final in Sopot and lost to Guillermo Coria. In doubles, he reached his first career final in Acapulco with Fernando Vicente. He compiled a 13–16 record on clay courts, 6–10 on hard, 1–1 on grass, and had a year-ending ranking of world no. 71.

=== 2004–2005: First Grand Slam quarterfinal, top 15 ===
In 2004, Ferrer reached the quarterfinals in Buenos Aires, Valencia, and at the ATP Masters Series Hamburg (defeated no. 6 David Nalbandian, lost to Guillermo Coria). He advanced to the semifinals in Stuttgart (lost to Gastón Gaudio). Later in the year he advanced to the quarterfinals in Bucharest and the semifinals in Palermo (lost to Tomáš Berdych) and Lyon (defeated Juan Carlos Ferrero, lost to Xavier Malisse). He ended the year with a ranking of world no. 49.

In 2005, Ferrer advanced to the semifinals in Miami by defeating David Nalbandian, Juan Carlos Ferrero, and Dominik Hrbatý, but lost to Rafael Nadal. He closed the year with a quarterfinal showing in Madrid, where he defeated Puerta, but lost to Robby Ginepri, and Paris, where he lost to Andy Roddick. He lost only once in the first round of nine Masters Series events, while compiling a 20–9 record. In doubles, Ferrer won his first two ATP titles in Viña del Mar and Acapulco (with Ventura) and earned a career-high US$951,772. He finished the year with a ranking of world no. 14.

=== 2006–2007: World Tour Finals final, top 5 ===
Ferrer opened the year with a quarterfinal showing in Auckland, where he lost to Olivier Rochus. He broke into the top 10 ATP rankings for the first time, following a personal-best fourth-round showing at the Australian Open, where he defeated Mario Ančić, but lost to Fabrice Santoro. He was in the top 10 for five weeks during the year. Then, playing in the first round of a Davis Cup tie versus Belarus, he lost to Vladimir Voltchkov in the second rubber. In March, he reached the semifinals in Miami for a second straight year, where he defeated no. 4 Andy Roddick, but lost to Roger Federer. In his second clay-court tournament of the year in Monte-Carlo, he lost to Federer. He also advanced to the quarterfinals at the Masters Series Hamburg, falling to eventual champion Tommy Robredo. In Düsseldorf, he posted wins over two top-10 players, world no. 4 Ivan Ljubičić and world no. 9 Fernando González. He reached the third round at the French Open and a career-best fourth round at Wimbledon, where he defeated González in the third round, but lost to Lleyton Hewitt. In July, he won a second career ATP title in a five-hour final in Stuttgart. He came back from two sets to one and a 1–5 deficit against Acasuso, saving one match point down 4–5 in the fourth set. In August, he reached the quarterfinals in Cincinnati, Ohio, where he defeated no. 10 Marcos Baghdatis, but lost to González, followed by a third-round showing at New Haven, where he lost to Agustín Calleri. At the US Open, he reached the third round for the second consecutive year, but lost to Mikhail Youzhny. Ferrer closed the year by reaching the quarterfinals in Basel, where he lost to Federer. For the year, he went 3–5 versus top-10 opponents and compiled records of 18–8 on clay and 17–13 on hard court. He finished the year ranked world no. 14 and in the top 15 for the second consecutive year.

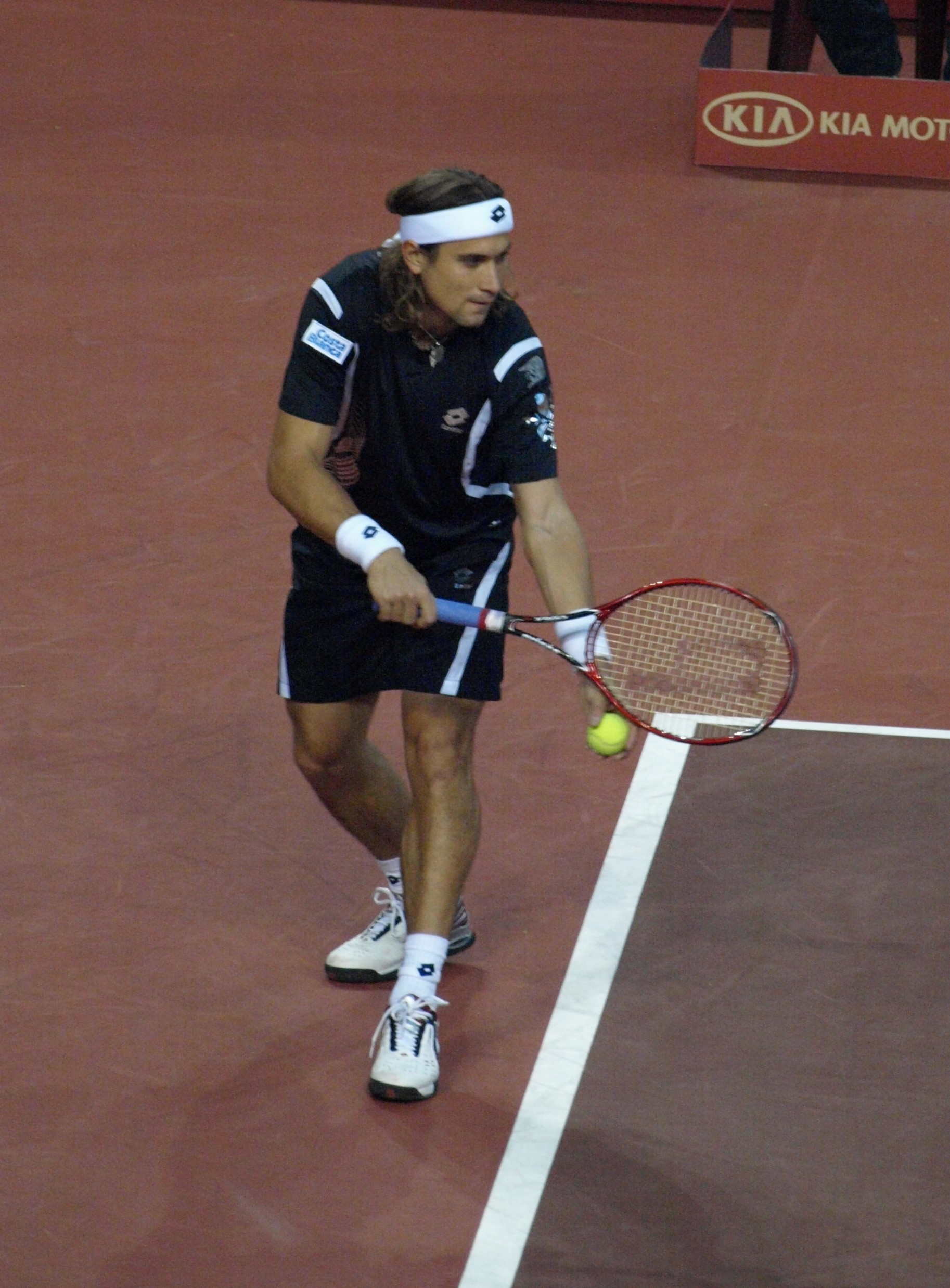
David Ferrer serving during 2007 Basel

Ferrer began the year by winning Auckland, defeating Tommy Robredo in the final. At the 2007 Australian Open, he defeated Kristian Pless, Thomas Johansson, and Radek Štěpánek, and lost in the fourth round to Mardy Fish in five sets. One month later, he reached the quarterfinals at Rotterdam. He had quarterfinal finishes at Indian Wells and Monte-Carlo and reached the fourth round in Miami, the semifinals in Barcelona, and the quarterfinals in Hamburg.

At the French Open, he was stopped by Fernando Verdasco in the third round. At Wimbledon, he was eliminated by Paul-Henri Mathieu in the second round.

In July, he captured his second title of the year and fourth of his career, beating Nicolás Almagro in the final of the Swedish Open in Båstad. He then advanced to the quarterfinals in Cincinnati, defeating Andy Roddick in the third round. At the US Open, he was seeded 15th and knocked out 24th-seeded David Nalbandian in the third round, and then upset second-seeded compatriot Rafael Nadal in the fourth round in four sets. He beat 20th-seeded Juan Ignacio Chela in the quarterfinals and reached his first Grand Slam semifinal, where he was defeated by third seed Novak Djokovic. His performance at the US Open brought his ranking up to world no. 8. Then, Ferrer captured his third title of the year in Tokyo, defeating Richard Gasquet in the final. At the Paris Masters, he made it to the quarterfinals, where he lost to David Nalbandian.

Ferrer qualified as the sixth seed for the year-ending Tennis Masters Cup. Ferrer upset third seed Djokovic in his first round-robin match, and then defeated second seed Rafael Nadal. He sealed his qualification for the knock-out stage by defeating eighth seed Richard Gasquet. He was the only man to have a perfect record in the round-robin stage and had the best win/loss set record (6–1). Ferrer next defeated fifth seed Andy Roddick in the semifinals. In the final, Ferrer lost to top seed Roger Federer. He ended the year with a career-high ranking of world no. 5.

=== 2008–2009: Two consecutive Davis Cup titles ===
Ferrer opened 2008 with a quarterfinal loss to unseeded Julien Benneteau of France in Auckland. He reached the second week of the Australian Open, however, as the fifth seed, without dropping a set in the first three rounds. He then went on to defeat 22nd seed Juan Carlos Ferrero in four sets in the fourth round, before falling to third seed and eventual champion Novak Djokovic in the quarterfinals. On 25 February, Ferrer became world no. 4, despite losing in the second round in Rotterdam.

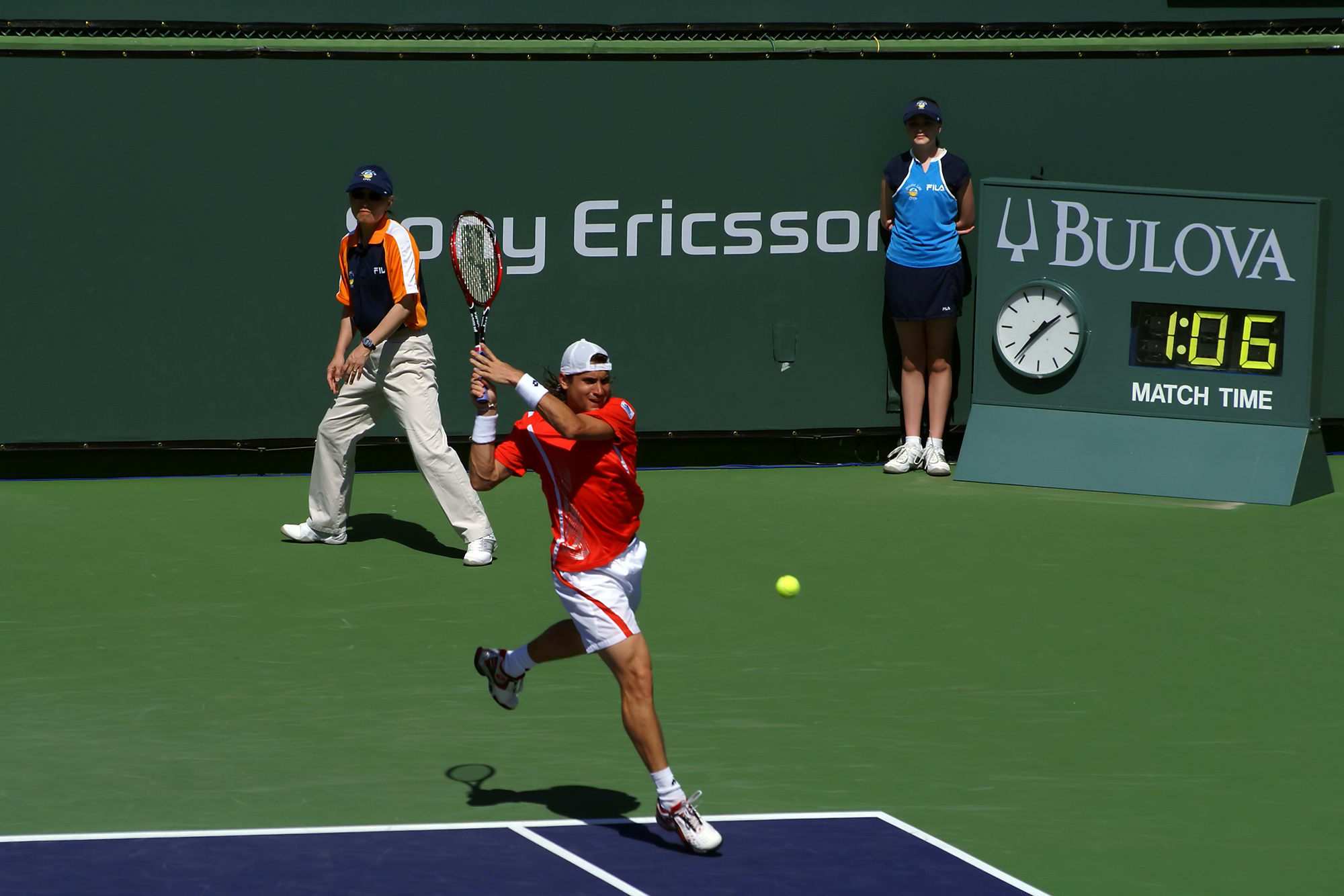
Ferrer at the 2008 Pacific Life Open

In April, he captured his first ATP title of the year, and the sixth in his career, when he defeated Nicolás Almagro in the final of Valencia. He saved three match points against Fernando Verdasco in the quarterfinals, and in the final, won the definitive set when he went down 5–2 in the third set, with two break points for Almagro. Ferrer reached the quarterfinals in the Monte Carlo Masters, losing against the eventual tournament champion Rafael Nadal, despite having five set points in the second set. In Barcelona, Ferrer reached the final, after defeating Nicolás Lapentti, Tommy Robredo and Stanislas Wawrinka. He again lost to Nadal in the final. Ferrer made it to the quarterfinals of the French Open, matching his previous best appearance in 2005. He defeated Steve Darcis and Fabrice Santoro. He then prevailed in two five-set matches over Lleyton Hewitt and Radek Štěpánek in the third and fourth rounds, respectively. He eventually fell to Gaël Monfils in four sets.

Ferrer began his grass-court season with another title at 's-Hertogenbosch in the Netherlands. He defeated Croatian Mario Ančić and Argentine Juan Martín del Potro en route to the final, where he won in straight sets over Marc Gicquel. This was his seventh career title and the first on grass. With this win, he became the second Spaniard (after Nadal) to win a grass-court tournament after a 36-year drought. At Wimbledon, Ferrer was seeded fifth. In the first round, he defeated Sergiy Stakhovsky, and Igor Andreev. He was eliminated by Ančić in the third round in four sets.

Representing Spain at the 2008 Summer Olympics, Ferrer was eliminated by Janko Tipsarević in the first round. At the US Open, Ferrer reached the third round as the fourth seed, where he lost Kei Nishikori, ranked 126, in one of the biggest upsets of the tournament. Ferrer saved five match points before losing the match. Seeded first at the China Open in Beijing, Ferrer was defeated by Dudi Sela in the second round. Ferrer lost in the second round of the Madrid Masters to fellow Spaniard Feliciano López.

Ferrer began his Season at the Heineken Open losing to Sam Querrey in the semifinals. At the Australian Open, he was upset by Marin Čilić in the third round. He then bounced back with a semifinal showing at the SA Tennis Open falling to Jérémy Chardy after dominating the first set, in a tightly contested second and third set. He reached his first final of the year at the Dubai Tennis Championships, losing to Novak Djokovic in straight sets. However, he bounced back defeating Novak Djokovic in a Davis Cup tie. At the Masters 1000 BNP Paribas Open and Sony Ericsson Open, he was able to reach the fourth round, losing to Andy Roddick and Juan Martín del Potro, respectively.

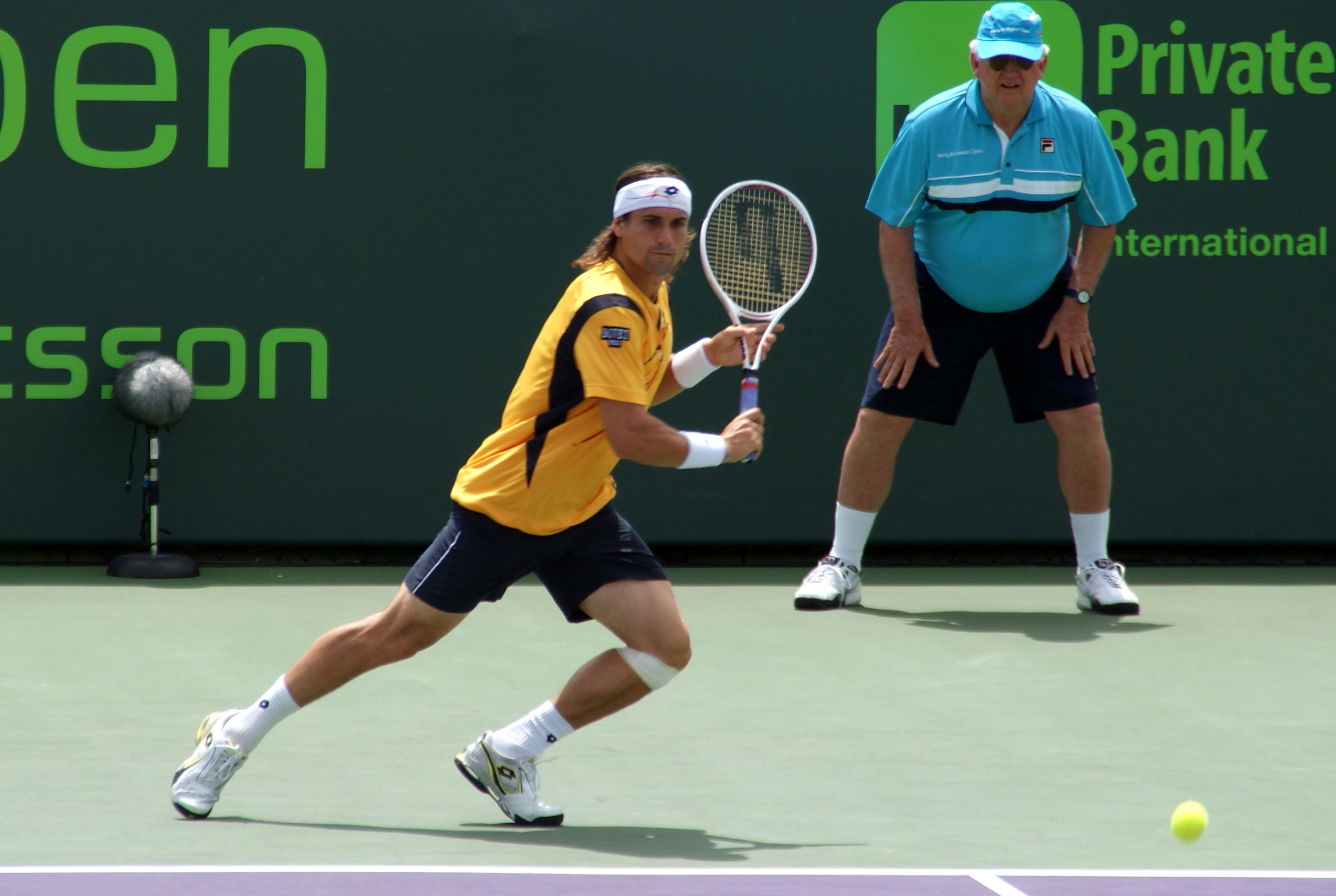
Ferrer in Miami

In the clay season, Ferrer played his first event at the Monte-Carlo Rolex Masters. After cruising through the first two rounds, he was routed by Fernando Verdasco. He rebounded by reaching the final of the Barcelona Open Banco Sabadell, losing to Rafael Nadal in the final. However, the Spaniard suffered early loses at the Internazionali BNL d'Italia, Estoril Open, and Mutua Madrileña Madrid Open. At the French Open, he fell to surprise finalist Robin Söderling in the third round. He played his Wimbledon warm-up at the Ordina Open and was upset by compatriot Iván Navarro in the quarterfinals. At Wimbledon, Ferrer suffered another third-round loss in a Grand Slam, this time falling to Czech Radek Štěpánek in five sets.

Ferrer then came back to clay at the International German Open, where he reached his fifth semifinal of the year, but lost to Nikolay Davydenko. However, the Spaniard had an abysmal US Open Series, losing in the third round of 2009 Western & Southern Financial Group Masters and in the second round of the Rogers Cup and the US Open. He then suffered back-to-back first-round loses at the Proton Malaysian Open and China Open, losing to Mikhail Youzhny and Fernando González. He also fell to Feliciano López in the second round of the Shanghai ATP Masters 1000. He was the defending champion at the Valencia Open 500, but withdrew prior to his second-round match against Albert Montañés due to a hamstring injury. He then helped Spain capture the Davis Cup title, when he defeated Radek Štěpánek in five sets.

=== 2010: First Masters final ===
Ferrer lost in the second round of the 2010 Australian Open to Marcos Baghdatis, after winning the first two sets, in a match lasting just over four hours. Ferrer's next tournament was the SA Tennis Open, where he defeated Karol Beck, Filip Prpic and Somdev Devvarman. However, in the semifinals, he lost to Stéphane Robert. Ferrer's next tournament was the Copa Telmex. He beat Simon Greul, Frederico Gil, Igor Andreev and Albert Montañés. However, in the final, he fell to Juan Carlos Ferrero.

Ferrer's next tournament was the 2010 Abierto Mexicano Telcel. He defeated Potito Starace, Thomaz Bellucci, Pablo Cuevas and Fernando González. In the final, he avenged his previous defeat by Juan Carlos Ferrero for his eighth career title. This was Ferrero's third straight final and also ended Ferrero's 14-match winning streak. His ranking also rose to no. 16. In the first round of the 2010 Davis Cup, Ferrer defeated Marco Chiudinelli and then Stanislas Wawrinka to advance Spain to the quarterfinals of the 2010 Davis Cup, where they faced France. Ferrer's next tournament was the 2010 BNP Paribas Open. In the second round, he was defeated by James Blake. Ferrer's next tournament was the 2010 Sony Ericsson Open. He defeated Michaël Llodra and Ivo Karlović. However, in the fourth round, he was defeated by Rafael Nadal.

Ferrer then entered the European clay-court swing. His first tournament was the 2010 Monte-Carlo Rolex Masters. He defeated Peter Luczak, Andrey Golubev and Ivan Ljubičić. In the quarterfinals, he defeated Philipp Kohlschreiber to advance to the semifinals, where he was again defeated by Nadal. Next, Ferrer participated in the 2010 Torneo Godo. He defeated Marcel Granollers, Simone Bolelli and Thomaz Bellucci in the quarterfinals. In the semifinals, he played Fernando Verdasco. Ferrer was leading Verdasco, 7–6, 4–2, before ultimately losing. Ferrer's next tournament was the 2010 Rome Masters. Ferrer defeated Evgeny Korolev, Potito Starace, world no. 5 Andy Murray, world no. 10 Jo-Wilfried Tsonga and world no. 9 Fernando Verdasco. In his first Masters 1000 event final Ferrer succumbed to Rafael Nadal. Due to his fantastic run in Rome, his ranking increased to world no. 12. Ferrer's next tournament was the 2010 Mutua Madrileña Madrid Open. He defeated Jérémy Chardy, Marcos Baghdatis after fending off a match point and Marin Čilić to advance to the quarterfinals. There, he, for the second successive time, beat world no. 4 Andy Murray. In the semifinals, Ferrer lost to world no. 1 Roger Federer in three sets. Ferrer's next tournament was the 2010 French Open. He began his campaign with a victory over David Guez, and then defeated Xavier Malisse when Malisse had to retire. In the third round. he fell to surprise semifinalist Jürgen Melzer.

Ferrer's next tournament was the Wimbledon, where he was the ninth seed. He defeated Nicolas Kiefer, Florent Serra and Jérémy Chardy in five sets, with Chardy serving for the match at 5–4 in the fifth. In the fourth round, he was defeated by Robin Söderling, again in five sets, despite being two points away from the match on two occasions. Ferrer next played for Spain in the 2010 Davis Cup. He lost his first rubber to Gaël Monfils of France. Spain ultimately lost to France 0–5. Ferrer then traveled to Sweden to play in the 2010 Swedish Open. He defeated Fabio Fognini and Pablo Cuevas to advance to the semifinals. Ferrer also extended his ATP best wins on clay in 2010 to 31 wins. However, he lost to Robin Söderling in the semifinals. He was then supposed to play in the 2010 International German Open as the second seed, but had to withdraw due to a shoulder injury.

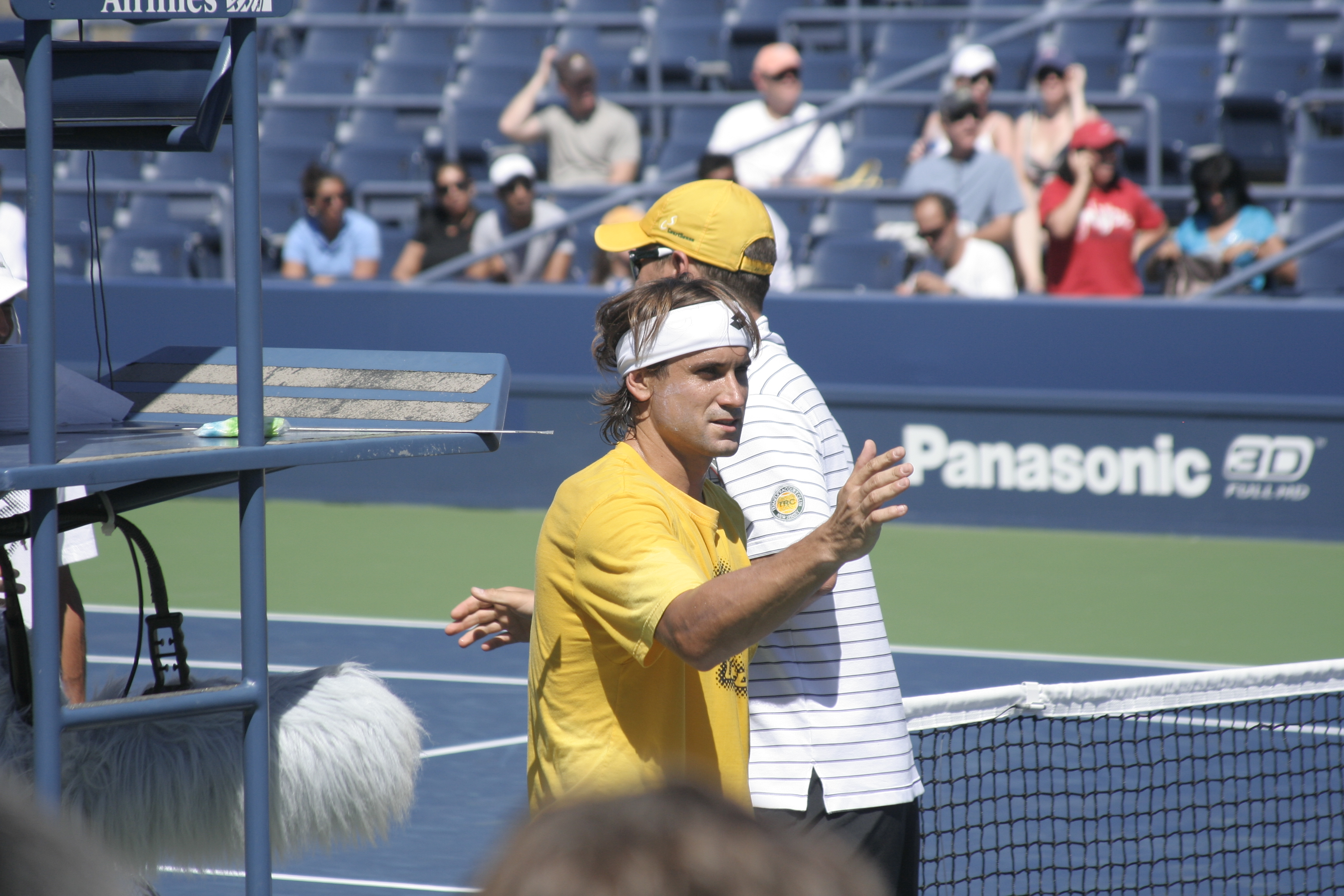
David Ferrer at the 2010 US Open

Ferrer's next tournament was the 2010 Rogers Cup, where he lost in the first round to David Nalbandian. Despite his loss, his ranking increased to world no. 11. Ferrer then traveled to Cincinnati to play in the 2010 Western & Southern Financial Group Masters. He defeated Alexandr Dolgopolov and Sam Querrey. However, in the third round, he lost to Nikolay Davydenko, despite being up a break of serve twice in the third set. Ferrer's next event was the 2010 US Open, where he was seeded tenth. In the first round, he defeated Alexandr Dolgopolov, and then defeated Benjamin Becker in the second round. He then defeated Daniel Gimeno-Traver for a spot in the round of 16. However, he lost to Fernando Verdasco despite being up 4–2 in the fifth set, and 4–1 in the tiebreaker. Due to Ferrer's appearance in the round of 16, Ferrer was ensured to return to the top 10, to no. 10 in the world. Ferrer then traveled to Malaysia to play in the 2010 Proton Malaysian Open. He defeated Bernard Tomic, Yuki Bhambri and world no. 7 Tomáš Berdych in the quarterfinals. However, in the semifinals, he was upset by Andrey Golubev. Ferrer then traveled to Beijing to play in the 2010 China Open. He defeated Denis Istomin, Yen-Hsun Lu, Robin Söderling and Ivan Ljubičić. However, in the final, he lost to Novak Djokovic in a rain-delayed match. With this run to the final, Ferrer once again returned to the top 10, at world no. 10, and this also put him in the eighth position for qualifying for the year-end championships.

Ferrer then traveled to Shanghai to play in the 2010 Shanghai Rolex Masters. He defeated Michaël Llodra and Thomaz Bellucci. However, he was defeated by Robin Söderling in the third round. Due to his round of 16 showing, he moved to no. 8 in the world. Also, he moved to no. 7 in the race to the year-end championships. Ferrer then traveled to Valencia to play in the 2010 Valencia Open 500 as the hometown favorite. At the 2010 Valencia Open 500, he defeated Guillermo García-López, Teymuraz Gabashvili, Potito Starace and Robin Söderling for a spot in the final. In the final, he defeated Marcel Granollers for the title, his ninth career title. With this victory, he moved to no. 7 in the race to the year-end championships and virtually secured his spot at the 2010 ATP World Tour Finals, and also improved his ranking to world no. 7. Ferrer's final regular-season tournament was the 2010 BNP Paribas Masters. He defeated Fabio Fognini. However, he lost to Jürgen Melzer in the third round. Despite his loss, Ferrer still qualified for the Barclays ATP World Tour Finals due to the fact that Fernando Verdasco lost his third-round match, sealing Ferrer's seventh spot and his second appearance since 2007. Ferrer then traveled to London to play in the 2010 ATP World Tour Finals, where he was seeded seventh. In his first match, he lost to Federer, and in his second match he lost to Söderling. Ferrer then lost to Andy Murray to finish the 2010 ATP World Tour Finals with an 0–3 record. Ferrer finished the year with a 60–24 record, and once again in the top 10, finishing at world no. 7.

=== 2011: Third Davis Cup title, two Masters finals ===
Ferrer began his 2011 ATP World Tour season at the 2011 Heineken Open, He defeated Tobias Kamke, Philipp Kohlschreiber and Santiago Giraldo for a berth in the final, where he defeated Nalbandian for his first title of the year and the tenth in his career.

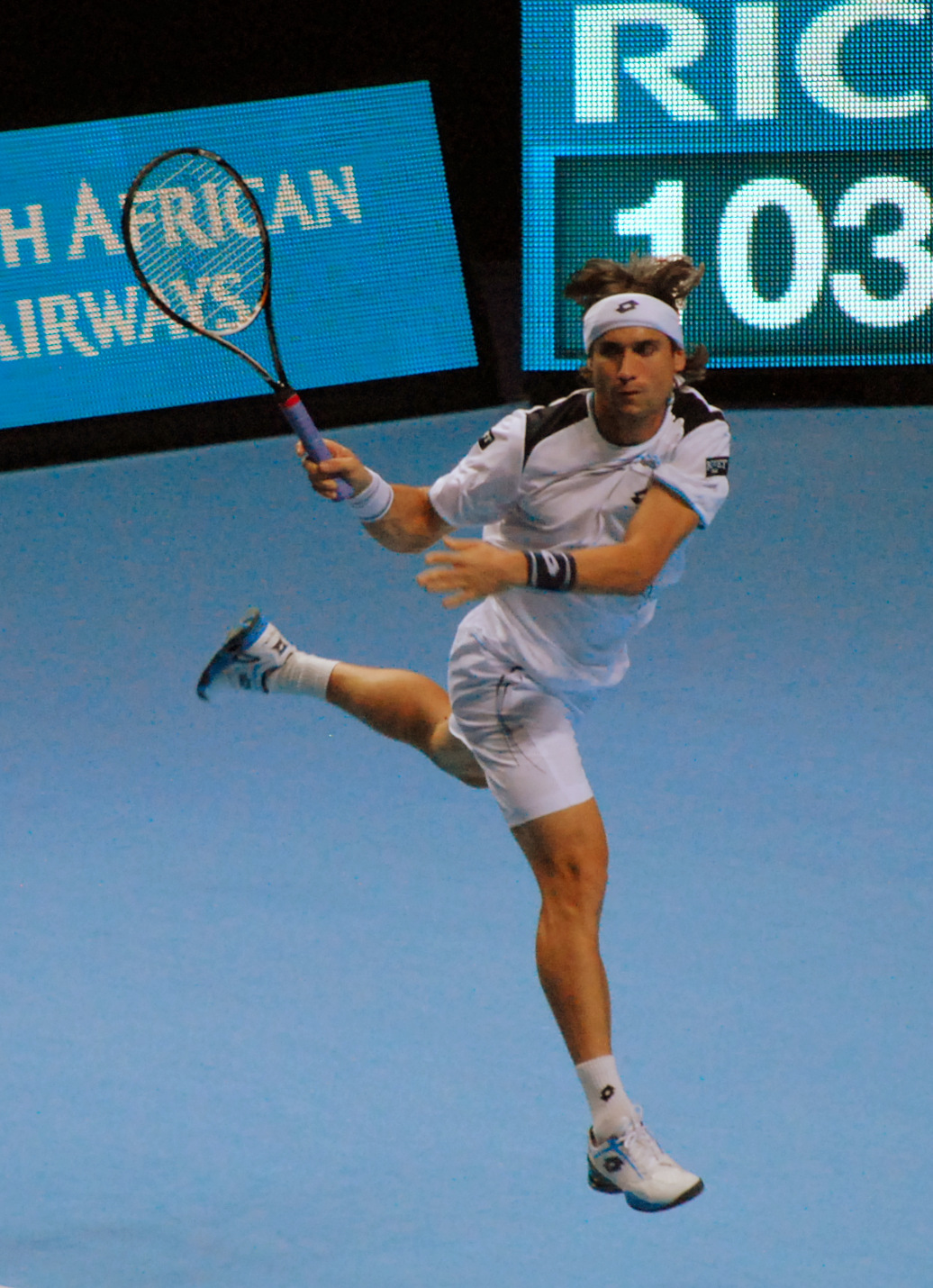
Ferrer in round-robin action at 2011 ATP World Tour Finals

Ferrer then traveled to Melbourne to play in the 2011 Australian Open, where he was seeded seventh. He defeated Jarkko Nieminen, Michael Russell, Ričardas Berankis and Milos Raonic for a spot in his second Australian Open quarterfinal. He beat an injured world no. 1 Rafael Nadal for a spot in the semifinals, winning in three sets. This notably ended Nadal's quest to win four straight majors. He lost to fifth seed Andy Murray in the semifinal. With his run to the semifinals of the Australian Open, his ranking rose to world no. 6.

Ferrer then traveled to Rotterdam to play in the 2011 ABN AMRO World Tennis Tournament, where he lost in the first round to Jarkko Nieminen. Next, Ferrer traveled to Acapulco for the 2011 Abierto Mexicano Telcel, where he defeated Adrian Ungur, Santiago González, Juan Mónaco and Alexandr Dolgopolov to advance to his second consecutive final at the Abierto Mexicano Telcel. He defeated compatriot Nicolás Almagro for his second consecutive title in Acapulco and his 11th career title.

Ferrer then traveled to Indian Wells to play in the 2011 BNP Paribas Open. He lost in the second round to big-serving Ivo Karlović. At 2011 Sony Ericsson Open in Miami, he defeated Igor Kunitsyn, Somdev Devvarman, and Marcel Granollers for a spot in the quarterfinals. However, in the quarterfinals, he fell to Mardy Fish, and later said it was due to indigestion.

Ferrer then traveled to Europe to begin the clay-court season. His first tournament was the 2011 Monte-Carlo Rolex Masters. He beat Feliciano López, Milos Raonic, Viktor Troicki and Jürgen Melzer to advance to his second Masters 1000 final, where he ultimately fell to Rafael Nadal.

Ferrer then traveled back to Spain to play in the 2011 Barcelona Open Banco Sabadell, where he beat Carlos Berlocq, Victor Hănescu, Jürgen Melzer and Nicolás Almagro for a spot in his third Barcelona final. However, in the final, he lost to Rafael Nadal for the second week in a row. Ferrer then traveled to Madrid to play in the 2011 Mutua Madrileña Madrid Open. He defeated Adrian Mannarino and Sergiy Stakhovsky. In the quarterfinals, Ferrer lost to Novak Djokovic. It was his first defeat in their four meetings on clay. Ferrer then pulled out of Rome, due to injury, but then traveled to Paris to play in the French Open.

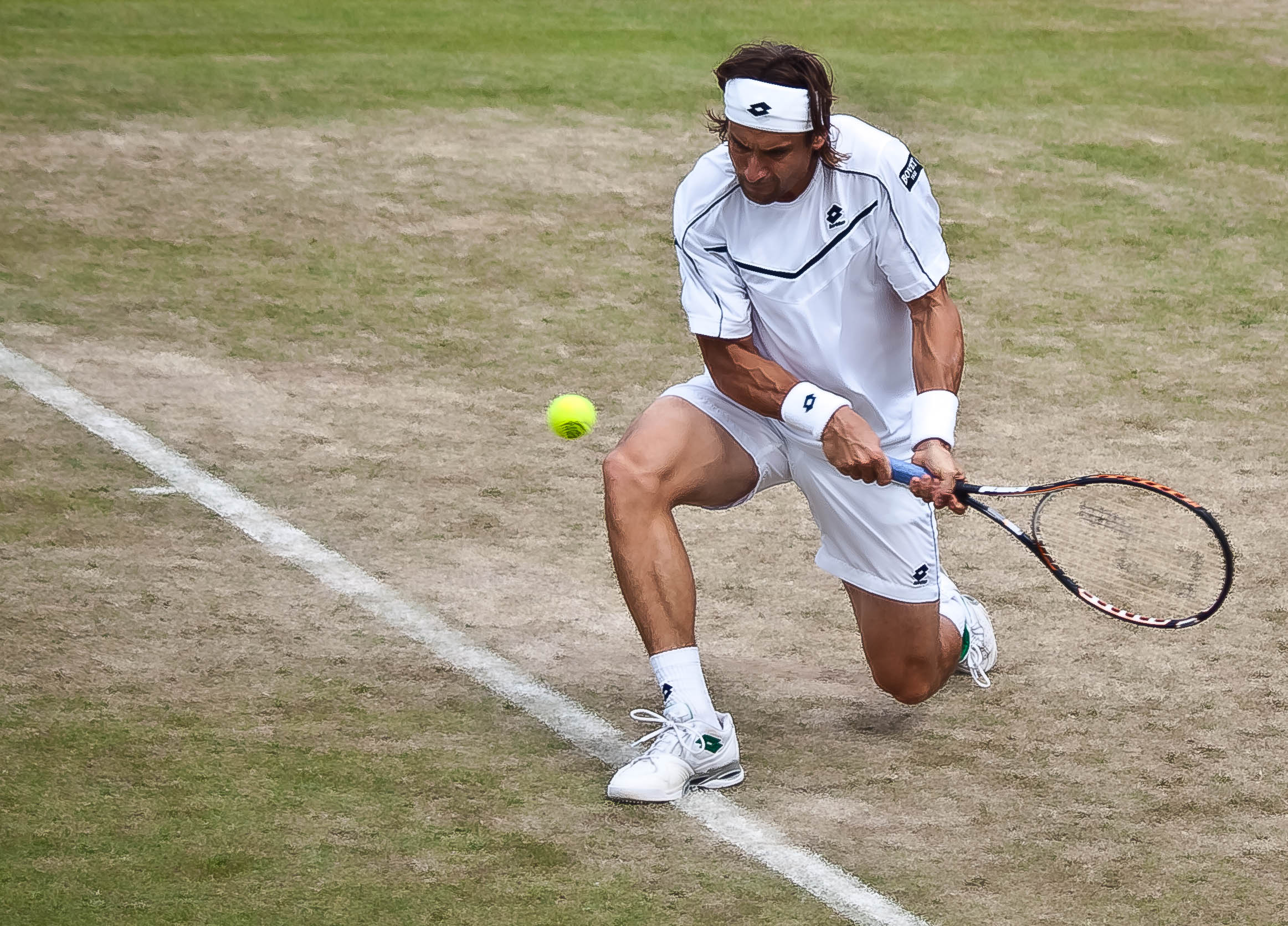
Ferrer at 2011 Wimbledon

At the French Open, Ferrer was seeded seventh. He advanced with easy wins over Jarkko Nieminen, Julien Benneteau, and Sergiy Stakhovsky, before ultimately falling to ninth seed Gaël Monfils in five sets. Due to his round of 16 appearance, Ferrer moved up to no. 6 in the world. Ferrer then took a month off before traveling to London to play in the 2011 Wimbledon Championships, as the seventh seed. He defeated Benoît Paire and Ryan Harrison in five sets. He then defeated Karol Beck in straight sets to advance to the round of 16. However, he fell to eventual semifinalist Jo Wilfried Tsonga.

After competing in two consecutive majors, Ferrer traveled to Sweden to play in the 2011 Swedish Open. He reached the semifinals, where he defeated Nicolás Almagro, but lost to Robin Söderling. Ferrer was then set to begin his summer hard-court series in Toronto, but pulled out with a hairline fracture of his left wrist. He healed in time to play in the 2011 Western & Southern Open. He won his second-round match against Grigor Dimitrov, before falling to Gilles Simon. Due to the result, Ferrer entered the top 5 in the ATP rankings again, becoming world no. 5.

At the US Open, he lost in the fourth round to Andy Roddick in four sets. At the 2011 Shanghai Rolex Masters, Ferrer defeated Milos Raonic, former world no. 1 Juan Carlos Ferrero, former world no. 1 Andy Roddick, and Feliciano López on his way to the final that he lost to second seed Andy Murray in straight sets. At the 2011 ATP World Tour Finals, Ferrer's first match was against world no. 3 Andy Murray and the Spaniard won it. In his next match against world no. 1 Novak Djokovic, Ferrer won in just 75 minutes, securing his spot in the semifinals. Ferrer lost his last round-robin match to Tomáš Berdych in three sets. In the semifinals, Ferrer faced the defending champion and world no. 3 Roger Federer and lost in straight sets. In the Davis Cup final in December, Ferrer won his rubber against Juan Martín del Potro in five sets.

=== 2012: Olympic doubles fourth place, first Masters title, fourth Davis Cup final ===
Ferrer started 2012 by participating in the Mubadala World Tennis Championship held in Abu Dhabi, United Arab Emirates. He defeated world no. 6 Jo-Wilfried Tsonga and world no. 2 Rafael Nadal to reach his first final in the exhibition tournament. In the final, he lost to world no. 1 Novak Djokovic. He won his first tournament of 2012 in Auckland, New Zealand at the Heineken Open ATP 250 (his third Auckland title and 12th Tour title) over Olivier Rochus. At the 2012 Australian Open, Ferrer was seeded fifth, and he defeated Rui Machado, Ryan Sweeting, 27th seed Juan Ignacio Chela, and 17th seed Richard Gasquet on his way to the quarterfinals. He then lost to world no. 1 Novak Djokovic in straight sets.

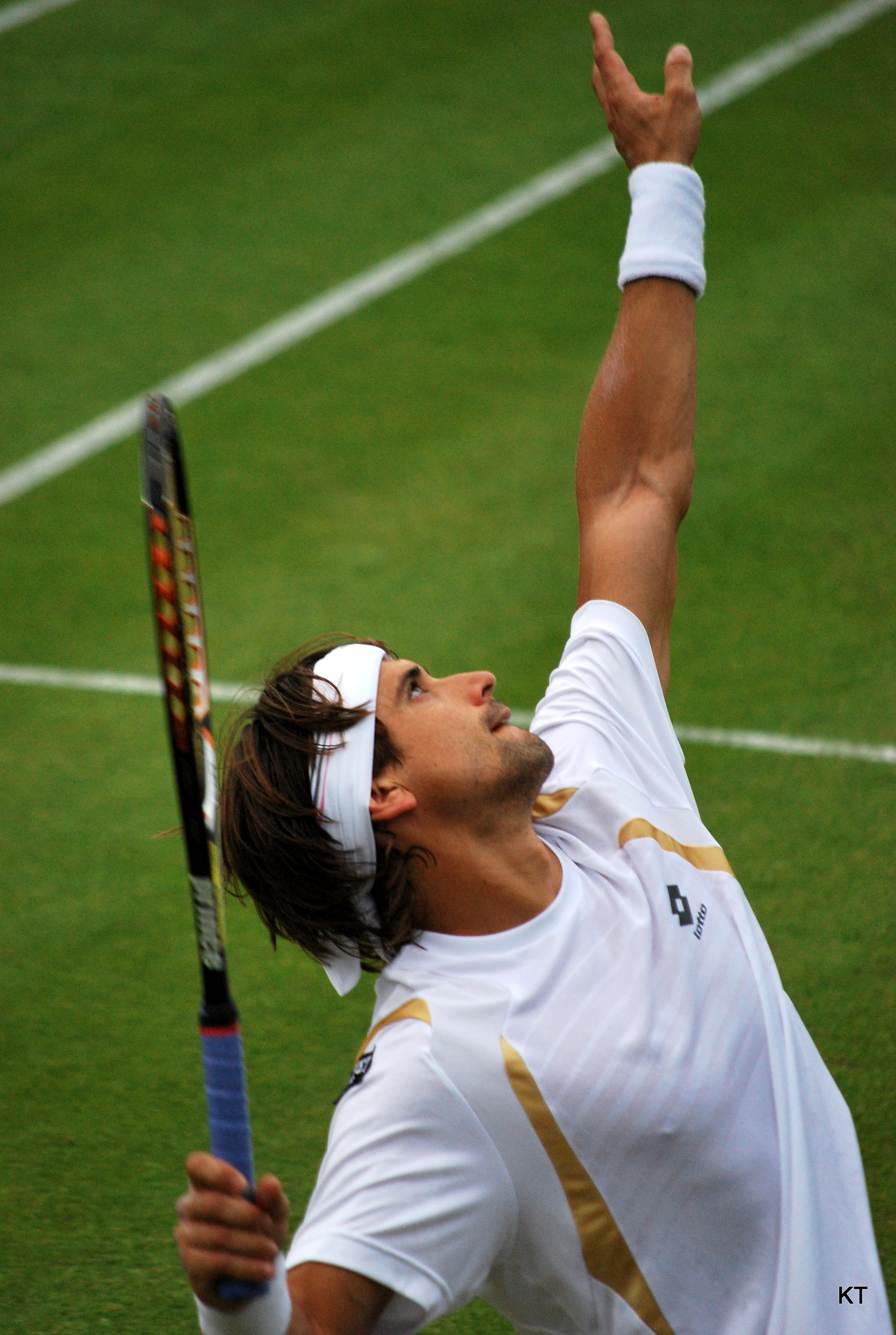
Ferrer serving at Wimbledon

At 2012 Copa Claro he won the event, defeating 2011 champion and second seed Nicolás Almagro. It was Ferrer's second title of the year and 13th of his career. His third singles title of the year and 14th overall came in Acapulco, Mexico a week after his win in Argentina. He beat fellow Spaniard Fernando Verdasco in the final, losing only three games. At the 2012 Sony Ericsson Open, Ferrer beat Bernard Tomic, Julien Benneteau, and 2009 US Open champion Juan Martín del Potro in straight sets to reach the quarterfinals, where he faced world no. 1 Novak Djokovic. Ferrer lost in straight sets.

At the 2012 Monte-Carlo Rolex Masters he lost his second-round match to Thomaz Bellucci. The following week, Ferrer reached the final at the 2012 Barcelona Open Banco Sabadell, after winning over Filip Krajinović, Albert Montañés, Feliciano López, and Milos Raonic. He then lost the final to defending champion Rafael Nadal. At the 2012 Muatua Madrid Open, held for the first time on blue clay, Ferrer defeated Radek Štěpánek and Nicolás Almagro on his way to the quarterfinals. He then faced world no. 3 and eventual champion Roger Federer and lost in straight sets. At the 2012 Internazionali BNL d'Italia, Ferrer defeated Fernando Verdasco, Gilles Simon, and Richard Gasquet on his way to the semifinals, where he lost to eventual champion Rafael Nadal. At the 2012 French Open, Ferrer lost only 25 games defeating Lukáš Lacko, Benoît Paire, Mikhail Youzhny, and Marcel Granollers on his way to the quarterfinals. There he won over world no. 4 Andy Murray and reached his first Roland Garros semifinal. He then lost to defending champion Rafael Nadal, winning five games.

Ferrer won his fourth singles title of the year and 15th overall in 's-Hertogenbosch, Netherlands. He beat Pierre-Ludovic Duclos, Leonardo Mayer, Igor Sijsling, Benoît Paire, and Philipp Petzschner on his way to his second grass singles title. Ferrer then reached the quarterfinals of Wimbledon, defeating Dustin Brown, Kenny de Schepper, Andy Roddick, and Juan Martín del Potro. Ferrer made it to the last eight for the first time at the tenth attempt. Ferrer then went on to lose the match to Andy Murray in a four-set thriller. Ferrer entered the quarterfinals of Swedish Open by defeating Simone Bolelli. He eventually advanced to the finals, where he defeated countryman Nicolás Almagro for his fifth title of the year.

At the US Open, Ferrer made it to his fourth career Grand Slam semifinal, where he lost in four sets to Novak Djokovic. The semifinal had to be played over two days because of the threat of a tornado on the final Saturday. He had previously defeated Kevin Anderson, Igor Sijsling, Lleyton Hewitt, Richard Gasquet, and Janko Tipsarević. Ferrer won his sixth title of the season in Valencia, defeating Alexandr Dolgopolov in the final. Ferrer won his first Masters 1000 title in Paris at the end of the season, beating Jo-Wilfried Tsonga in the quarterfinals, Michaël Llodra in the semifinals, and Jerzy Janowicz in the final. This was also his seventh ATP Tour-level title of the year, the most of any player that season. He also won more matches that year than any other player, male or female. In late 2012 Ferrer faced questions about his involvement with doping doctor Luis Garcia del Moral.

=== 2013: French Open final, two Masters finals, world No.3 ===
Ferrer started his 2013 season by successfully defending his Heineken Open title defeating Philipp Kohlschreiber in straight sets. At the Australian Open, Ferrer came back from two sets down to defeat fellow Spaniard Nicolas Almagro in the quarterfinals. In his semifinal match he was thrashed by eventual champion Djokovic in straight sets, winning only five games. Following the continued absence of Rafael Nadal from the ATP Tour, Ferrer became the Spanish no. 1 for the first time in his career, re-entering the top 4 in the rankings on 28 January 2013. Ferrer then won his second title of the year at the Copa Claro defeating Stanislas Wawrinka in three sets. but lost to Nadal in the 2013 Abierto Mexicano Telcel final in Acapulco, winning only two games. He then suffered an early loss at the 2013 BNP Paribas Open, falling to Kevin Anderson in his first match of the tournament.

Ferrer reaches his eighth consecutive Grand Slam quarterfinal

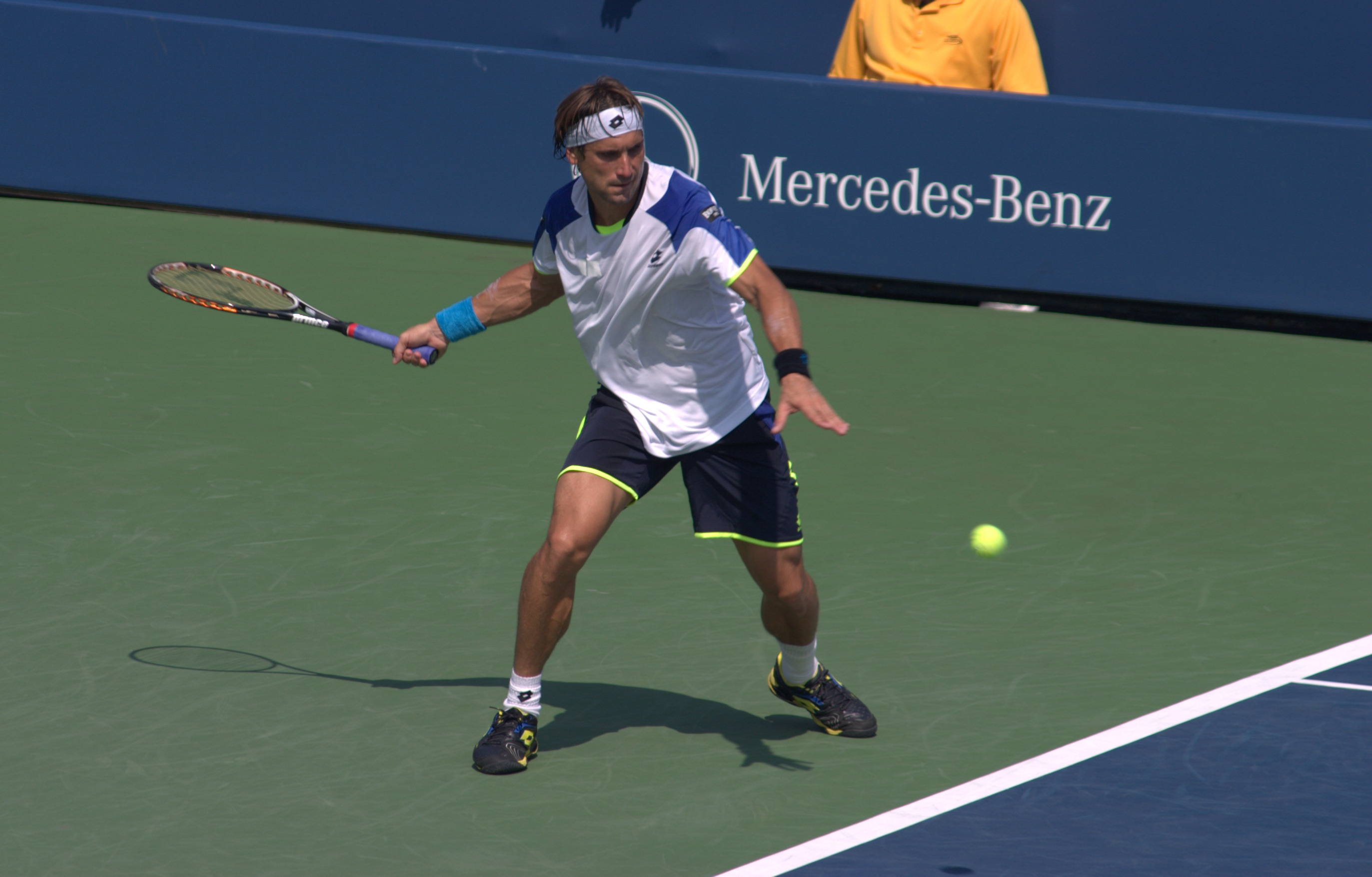
David Ferrer at the 2013 US Open

He then reached the final of Miami Masters after outlasting Jürgen Melzer and Tommy Haas, but lost to Andy Murray after holding a championship point in the deciding set. Ferrer moved back into the top 4 as a result. Ferrer withdrew from Monte Carlo and was upset by Dmitry Tursunov at the Barcelona Open Banco Sabadell. Ferrer reached his fifth final of the year at the Portugal Open facing Wawrinka, but this time falling in straight sets to the Swiss.

He then lost to Nadal in back-to-back quarterfinals in the Masters event of Mutua Madrid Open and Internazionali BNL d'Italia. At the French Open, Ferrer reached his first Grand Slam final without dropping a set. He defeated three of his compatriots, Albert Montañés, Feliciano López, and Tommy Robredo, all in straight sets, to reach his sixth Grand Slam semifinal. He then defeated sixth seed Jo-Wilfried Tsonga to reach the final, where he was defeated by defending champion Rafael Nadal. Despite failing to win the title, Ferrer regained the world no. 4 spot from Nadal on the basis of earning more points than the previous year, while Nadal defended his entire points total from 2012.

At the 2013 TOPSHELF Open in 's-Hertogenbosch, Ferrer went out in the first round to veteran Xavier Malisse. His next tournament was Wimbledon, where he made it to the quarterfinals for the second consecutive year before falling to Juan Martín del Potro in straight sets. Ferrer had disastrous US Open tune-ups at the 2013 Rogers Cup and 2013 Western & Southern Open, winning only one match and losing to Russians Alex Bogomolov, Jr. in the second round and Dmitry Tursunov in the third round. He rebounded at the US Open, losing to Richard Gasquet in the quarterfinals in five sets despite taking the third and fourth sets, in his first loss since 2008 to the Frenchman.

He then reached another final, at the If Stockholm Open facing Grigor Dimitrov, but lost in three sets to hand the Bulgarian his first title. Ferrer then followed it up with another final appearance at the Valencia Open 500, where he was the defending champion. However, he fell to Mikhail Youzhny in straight sets. He reached his third final in as many weeks at the BNP Paribas Masters, where he was the defending champion after defeating world no. 1 Rafael Nadal, ending a nine-match losing streak to Rafa. However, he lost to Novak Djokovic in straight sets, despite serving for each set in the tenth game. This was Ferrer's seventh consecutive loss in a final.

A big change in December was his parting with coach Javier Piles, who had been his coach from the beginning of his career.

He did not win any matches at the year-end championships for a disappointing end to the year. However, he had his best year-end finish in the rankings at no. 3.

=== 2014: Seventh Masters final and steady ranking ===
Ferrer began his 2014 season losing to Daniel Brands in the second round of the Qatar Open. He reached the semifinals of the Heineken Open, where he was defeated by Lu Yen-hsun. Ferrer reached the quarterfinals of the 2014 Australian Open, where he lost to Tomas Berdych in four sets. In February, Ferrer successfully defended his title at the 2014 Copa Claro, which was his first title of the year. In 2014 Rio Open semifinals, Ferrer was defeated by Alexandr Dolgopolov in straight sets. At the 2014 Abierto Mexicano Telcel quarterfinals, Ferrer retired against Kevin Anderson due to leg injury.

Ferrer made his return in the 2014 Sony Open Tennis reaching the fourth round before losing to Kei Nishikori after squandering four match points. He made the semifinals of the 2014 Monte-Carlo Rolex Masters. In the quarterfinals, he beat Rafael Nadal for the first time in 10 years on clay, before losing to Stanislas Wawrinka in the semifinals. He made the semifinals at the 2014 Mutua Madrid Open, where he lost to Kei Nishikori. He was defeated by Novak Djokovic in the quarterfinals at the 2014 Internazionali BNL d'Italia. Ferrer made it to the 2014 French Open quarterfinals. He lost to world no. 1 and compatriot, Rafael Nadal, in four sets.

Ferrer was defeated by world no.118 Andrey Kuznetsov in the second round of the 2014 Wimbledon Championships ending his 10 grand slam quarterfinal streak. He made it to the quarterfinals in the 2014 Swedish Open before losing to Carlos Berlocq in straight sets. He made it to the final of the 2014 International German Open, where was defeated by Leonardo Mayer.

He began his American Swing by reaching quarterfinals of the 2014 Rogers Cup before losing to Roger Federer. He made it to the final of the 2014 Western & Southern Open. In the final, he was again defeated by Roger Federer. However, 2014 US Open became a disappointment, when he was defeated by Gilles Simon.

Ferrer was upset by Viktor Troicki at the 2014 ATP Shenzhen Open. He continued to struggle in the Asian Swing by bowing out against Marcel Granollers in the 2014 Rakuten Japan Open Tennis Championships. He improved in the 2014 Shanghai Rolex Masters by defeating Martin Klizan and Andy Murray both coming from a set down. He lost to Novak Djokovic in the quarterfinals.

Ferrer made it to the final of the 2014 Erste Bank Open, losing to Andy Murray. He made it to the quarterfinals of the 2014 BNP Paribas Masters before losing to Kei Nishikori. As a result, he failed to qualify for the 2014 ATP World Tour Finals, but later replaced Milos Raonic in the group phase when the latter had to withdraw due to an injury. He lost his match against Kei Nishikori in three sets and finished the year ranked no.10.

=== 2015: Return to form and continued success ===
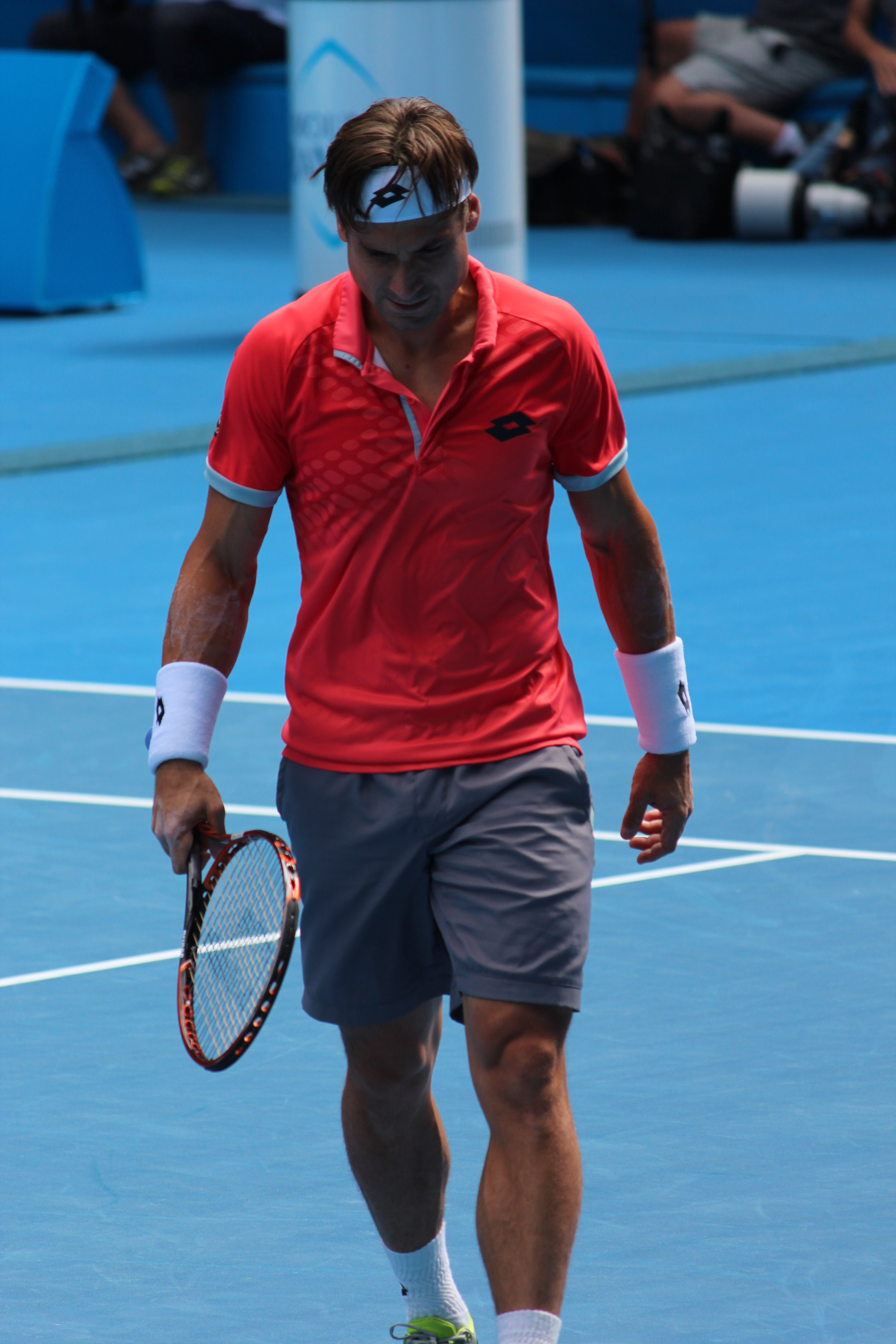
Ferrer at the Australian Open

Ferrer began his 2015 season at the Qatar ExxonMobil Open, where he won his 22nd ATP World Tour title by defeating Tomáš Berdych in the final in straight sets. He was then scheduled to play at the Heineken Open in Auckland a week later, but withdrew due to fatigue. At the 2015 Australian Open, he made it to the fourth round, losing to Kei Nishikori.

In February, Ferrer won back-to-back titles at the 2015 Rio Open and 2015 Abierto Mexicano Telcel by defeating Fabio Fognini and Kei Nishikori, respectively.

In May, Ferrer made the semifinals of the Rome Masters, before being defeated by Novak Djokovic, matching his best performance at the tournament since 2012.

Next, Ferrer competed at the 2015 French Open getting through the first two rounds without dropping a set. Then, Ferrer beat Simone Bolelli in the third round in a close five-setter, as well as defeating Marin Cilic in straight sets to reach his fourth French Open quarterfinal, before losing to Andy Murray in four sets.

However, Ferrer lost his first match on grass at Queen's Club and withdrew from Wimbledon due to an elbow injury. He was eliminated early at the US Open.

Ferrer proceeded to win his 25th career title at the Kuala Lumpur Open, defeating compatriot Feliciano López. This marked the first ever all-Spanish final and Ferrer became the first ever Spaniard to win the title in Kuala Lumpur. Winning the title, he also maintained his 4–0 wins in finals in 2015.

He continued his winning streak by winning the Ersta Bank Open in Vienna, defeating Fabio Fognini, Gaël Monfils and Steve Johnson to bring his finals record in 2015 to 5–0.

=== 2016: Out of top 20 ===
Ferrer started his season in an exhibition at the Mubadala World Tennis Championships. Ferrer easily defeated Jo-Wilfried Tsonga and then lost to Rafael Nadal in a close three-setter. Ferrer then beat Stan Wawrinka in the third place match. At the Qatar Open Ferrer lost in the first round to Illya Marchenko, despite winning the first set. Ferrer then competed at Auckland. Ferrer made it through to the semifinals after defeating qualifier Matthew Barton and Lukáš Rosol, but lost to Jack Sock despite winning the first set. Ferrer then played in the first Grand Slam of the year at the Australian Open. Ferrer defeated qualifier Peter Gojowczyk and Lleyton Hewitt, who was playing his last career singles match, 31st seed Steve Johnson and 10th seed John Isner. Ferrer reached the quarterfinals without having lost a set. In the quarterfinals, Ferrer lost to second seed Andy Murray in four sets. At the Argentina Open. Ferrer defeated Renzo Olivo and Pablo Cuevas, before losing to Nicolás Almagro in straight sets in the semifinals. At the Rio Open, Ferrer defeated Nicolás Jarry and Albert Ramos-Viñolas. Ferrer's tournament came to an end in the quarterfinals when he lost to Dominic Thiem in straight sets. Ferrer fell in the second round of the Mexican Open to Alexandr Dolgopolov and the second round of the Miami Open to Lucas Pouille to end his hard-court season.

To begin the clay-court season, Ferrer competed at the Madrid Open, defeating both Guillermo García-López and Denis Kudla in three sets, before falling to Tomáš Berdych in straight sets. He followed this up with another third-round appearance in the Rome Masters, this time losing to Pouille in straight sets. He began the French Open well, defeating Evgeny Donskoy, Juan Mónaco and Feliciano López before again falling to Berdych in straight sets. The grass-court season did not go nearly as well, bowing out in the first round of Halle to Andreas Seppi and the second round of Wimbledon to Nicolas Mahut.

The hard-court season began with the Olympics for Ferrer. Ferrer got through the first round against Denis Istomin, before falling to Donskoy in a tightly contested match. The Cincinnati Masters saw another first-round exit, this time at the hands of Julien Benneteau. Ferrer began the US Open by defeating Dolgopolov in the first round and Fabio Fognini in the second, before falling to an in-form Juan Martín del Potro in the third round, matching his performance of the previous two years at the tournament.

=== 2017–18: Last title, final Grand Slam appearance ===
After playing in two 250-level Pacific warm-up events, Ferrer competed in the 2017 Australian Open. He defeated two qualifiers before falling to compatriot Roberto Bautista Agut in the third round. This marked Ferrer's earliest exit at the tournament since 2010.

In July of the same year, Ferrer won his first tournament since October 2015 at the 2017 Swedish Open, defeating Ukrainian Alexandr Dolgopolov in the final. In the Cincinnati Masters, Ferrer defeated world No. 8 Dominic Thiem to reach the semifinals where he lost to Nick Kyrgios in two tiebreak sets.

In his final grand slam appearance, Ferrer was drawn to face compatriot and long-time rival Rafael Nadal in the opening round of the 2018 US Open. The match came to a premature end in the middle of the second set when Ferrer was forced to retire from the match with a calf injury.

=== 2019: Retirement ===
On 15 August 2018, Hopman Cup organisers announced that Ferrer would represent Spain at the 2019 edition alongside Garbiñe Muguruza. It was his debut appearance at this tournament.

On 28 August 2018, Ferrer announced that the 2019 season would be his last in the tour. He also announced a preliminary list of 6 tournaments in which he wanted to compete during his final season: the Hopman Cup, Auckland, Buenos Aires, Acapulco, Barcelona and Madrid.

At the Miami Masters, Ferrer battled from a set down to defeat world number 3 Alexander Zverev. This was Ferrer's first top 3 victory in almost 5 years.

Ferrer would cross the path of Alexander Zverev again at his final tournament, the Madrid Masters. From 4–1 up in the first set, he lost 6–4, 6–1, thus ending his career.

Ferrer announced that he would be the new director of the Barcelona Open. Albert Costa was the previous director of the tournament for 11 years.

== Coaching career ==
Ferrer began coaching Alexander Zverev in July 2020 alongside Zverev's father. They have since parted ways.

== Playing style and reputation ==
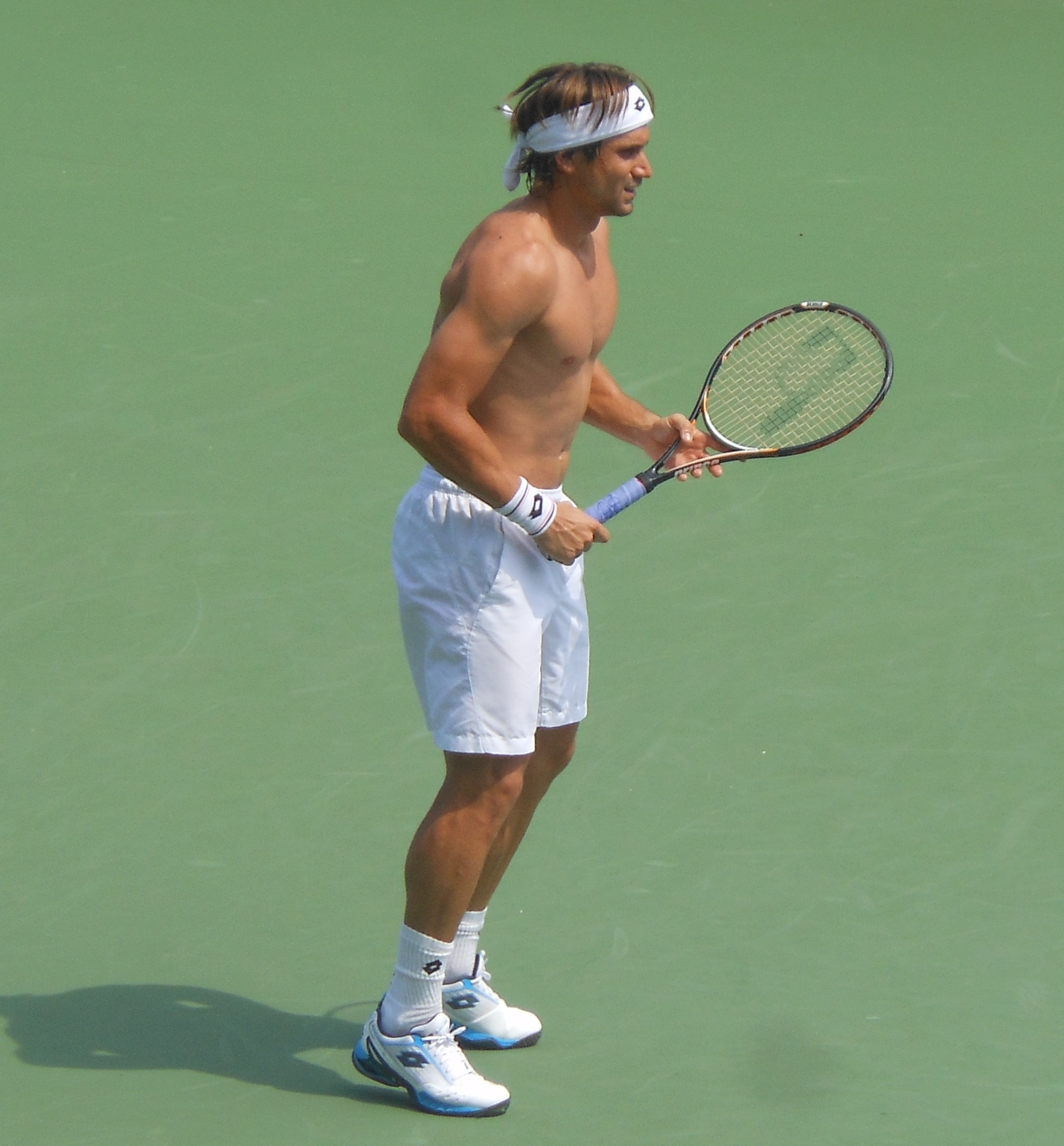
David Ferrer practices at the US Open.

Ferrer is noted for being one of the more dogged, agile, and fit players on the tour, and he has won many matches with consistent baseline play, great fitness, footspeed, and determination. Although he does not possess powerful groundstrokes like many of his contemporaries, his ability to keep the ball deep in play and move his opponents around the court has allowed him to be successful on all surfaces, especially on clay and hard courts. Although he is not a great net player, Ferrer's speed allows him to quickly cut off his opponents' shots and volley whilst they are off balance. Darren Cahill has said that Ferrer and Novak Djokovic are the two best returners in the men's game, even surpassing former dominant return specialists like Andre Agassi, who Cahill previously regarded as the best return specialist in the history of men's tennis. In 2007, Roger Federer regarded Ferrer as the best returner in the men's game. At a personal level, Ferrer's reputation on the tour is that of a humble and shy person, rarely being involved in any controversy throughout his career. Calm and disciplined, he is admired for his tenacity and competitiveness on the court.

Due to his speed, defensive prowess and lack of significant power, many have compared Ferrer's playing style to that of former US Open and Wimbledon champion Lleyton Hewitt.

In February 2016, Ferrer featured in a video by the ATP titled "Ferrer Getting Better and Better". It highlighted the longevity of Ferrer's career, his fighting spirit, consistency and the success he has been able to achieve even at the age of 36. It pointed out that, despite his long career, Ferrer had his second best season in 2015. Ferrer has the most match wins, the most tournament wins, and the most Grand Slam match wins of all players who have not won a Grand Slam. In the video, Ferrer also reveals that his tennis idol growing up was Sergi Bruguera.

== Personal life ==
Ferrer supports Valencia CF. He also enjoys playing basketball.

On 28 November 2015, Ferrer married his long-time girlfriend, Marta Tornel Nieto. The couple were introduced in 2008 by Ferrer's then-coach Javier Piles and his wife. Tornel has a degree in optometry and works at her family's optician practice in Benifaió. On 4 May 2018, Ferrer and Tornel announced the birth of a son, Leo, via social media.

An avid reader, Ferrer's favorite novelists are Arturo Perez-Reverte and Ildefonso Falcones. Ferrer's favorite book is Perez-Reverte's La Reina del Sur (Queen of the South). He keeps every book he reads. Of reading, Ferrer says, "I want to read books that will help me improve as a person and not just a tennis player."

== Rivalries ==
=== Ferrer vs. Murray ===
Ferrer and Andy Murray have faced each other 20 times (not including one occasion when there was a walkover in favour of Murray), with Ferrer trailing in their head-to-head, 6–14. Ferrer leads 4–1 on clay, while Murray leads on hard courts 12–2, and 1–0 on grass. They have met each other five times at Grand Slam tournament level, which Murray leads 4–1. The first was at 2011 Australian Open, which Murray won after losing the first set. They would meet again in 2012 Roland Garros, which Ferrer won losing the second set in a tie-breaker, and 2012 Wimbledon, with Murray scoring the win in a four set match. The next two matches occurred at the 2015 Roland Garros and the 2016 Australian Open, which Murray won, despite Ferrer managing to win a set off Murray in both matches. During the rivalry, they have only met three times at the Barclays ATP World Tour Finals, with Murray leading 2–1.

=== Ferrer vs. Verdasco ===
Ferrer and Verdasco have faced each other 21 times, with Ferrer leading in their head-to-head, 14–7. Ferrer leads 6–4 on clay and 8–2 on hard courts, while Verdasco leads 1–0 on grass. They have only had two meetings at a Grand Slam tournament level, with both matches going to Verdasco. The first took place 2007 Roland Garros, which Verdasco won after losing the first set (4–6, 7–6^{(2)}, 6–3, 6–3). The second meeting occurred at 2010 US Open, which Verdasco won in a five-setter match (5–7, 6–7^{(8)}, 6–3, 6–3, 7–6^{(4)}).

=== Ferrer vs. Lopez ===
Ferrer and Lopez have faced each other 19 times, with Ferrer leading in their head-to-head, 11–8. Ferrer leads 7–3 on clay, while Lopez leads on hard courts 5–4. They have met each other three times at Grand Slam tournament level. The three meetings took place at Roland Garros, with Ferrer winning two and Lopez winning one. The pair first met each other in the semifinals of New Haven 2005, which Lopez won in three sets. Ever year after 2005 they competed against each other, with 2010 being the exception. No matches were played on that year.

=== Ferrer vs. Berdych ===
Ferrer and Berdych have met 16 times, sharing even wins against one another. Their head-to-head is 8–8. Ferrer trails against Berdych 2–4 on clay, whereas he leads 5–3 on hard courts, and is tied at 1–1 on grass. Their first meeting was at the Gstaad Open, with Ferrer winning. They have only met each other three times at Grand Slam tournament level, with Berdych leading 3–0. The first was in the 2014 Australian Open, which Berdych won after losing the third set. Their second meeting was at the 2016 Roland Garros, which Berdych won in three straight sets. Their third encounter was at 2017 Wimbledon Championship, where Berdych won again in straight sets.

In addition, they have faced each other twice at the Barclays ATP World Tour Finals and once in the Davis Cup, with Berdych leading 2–0 and Ferrer leading 1–0 respectively. Despite playing 16 matches against each other, they have only played in one tiebreaker against each other, this was at the 2016 Mutua Madrid Open which Berdych won 10–8 in the opening set. He went to win the match in straight sets. For multiple reasons, both Ferrer and Berdych have been considered the greatest players of all time to not have won a Grand Slam.

=== Ferrer vs. Wawrinka ===
Ferrer and Wawrinka have met 14 times, scoring equal wins against one another. Ferrer and Wawrinka are even on clay 3–3, while Ferrer trails against Wawrinka 3–4 on hard courts; Ferrer leads 1–0 on grass. Despite meeting on many occasions, they have never played against each other at Grand Slam level. There have been two encounters at Barclay ATP World Tour Finals in the years of 2013 and 2015, which Wawrinka won, and one encounter at the Davis Cup in 2010, with Ferrer beating Wawrinka in straight sets.

=== Ferrer vs. Nishikori ===
Ferrer and Nishikori have met 14 times, with Nishikori leading 10–4. Their first encounter was at 2008 US Open with Nishikori beating Ferrer in a five-set thriller. They next met again from 2011 to 2013 with Ferrer winning 3 times in straight sets and Nishikori winning only once in the Olympics at 2012 in three sets. However, throughout 2014, they met four times, with every match won by Nishikori. They first met in 2014 in the Miami Masters with Nishikori beating Ferrer in 3 tight-sets after saving 4 match points to progress to the QF. They next had an epic encounter at the Madrid Open with Nishikori beating Ferrer in another tight 3-setter to progress to the final of a Masters 1000. Their next 2 encounters were in the BNP Paribas Masters and the ATP World Tour Finals where Nishikori again defeated the Spaniard in 3 sets.

In 2015, Ferrer had a remarkable start to the season but was beaten in the Australian Open by Nishikori in straight sets. However, Ferrer ended his losing streak to Nishikori in the 2015 Abierto Mexicano Telcel, where he beat Nishikori in straight sets in the final. In Madrid, in the quarterfinals, Nishikori took revenge and beat him in straight sets.

== Career statistics ==
=== Grand Slam tournament performance timeline ===
Key
W	F	SF	QF	#R	RR	Q#	DNQ	A	NH

(W) winner; (F) finalist; (SF) semifinalist; (QF) quarterfinalist; (#R) rounds 4, 3, 2, 1; (RR) round-robin stage; (Q#) qualification round; (DNQ) did not qualify; (A) absent; (NH) not held; (SR) strike rate (events won / competed); (W–L) win–loss record.

Tournament	2002	2003	2004	2005	2006	2007	2008	2009	2010	2011	2012	2013	2014	2015	2016	2017	2018	SR	W–L	Win %
Australian Open	A	1R	2R	1R	4R	4R	QF	3R	2R	SF	QF	SF	QF	4R	QF	3R	1R	0 / 16	41–16	72%
French Open	Q2	2R	2R	QF	3R	3R	QF	3R	3R	4R	SF	F	QF	QF	4R	2R	1R	0 / 16	44–16	73%
Wimbledon	A	2R	2R	1R	4R	2R	3R	3R	4R	4R	QF	QF	2R	A	2R	3R	1R	0 / 15	28–15	65%
US Open	A	1R	1R	3R	3R	SF	3R	2R	4R	4R	SF	QF	3R	3R	3R	1R	1R	0 / 16	32–16	67%
Win–loss	0–0	2–4	3–4	6–4	10–4	11–4	12–4	7–4	9–4	14–4	18–4	19–4	10–4	9–3	10–4	5–4	0–4	0 / 63	145–63	70%

=== Grand Slam tournament finals: 1 (1 runner-up) ===
Result	Year	Championship	Surface	Opponent	Score
Loss	2013	French Open	Clay	(Spain) Rafael Nadal	3–6, 2–6, 3–6

=== Year–End Championships performance timeline ===
Tournament	2002	2003	2004	2005	2006	2007	2008	2009	2010	2011	2012	2013	2014	2015	2016	2017	2018	2019	SR	W–L	Win %
ATP World Tour Finals	DNQ					F	DNQ		RR	SF	RR	RR	RR	RR	DNQ				0 / 7	8–14	36%

=== Year–End Championship finals: 1 (1 runner-up) ===
Result	Year	Championship	Surface	Opponent	Score
Loss	2007	Shanghai	Hard (i)	(Switzerland) Roger Federer	2–6, 3–6, 2–6
