= Mariusz Fyrstenberg =

Polish tennis player

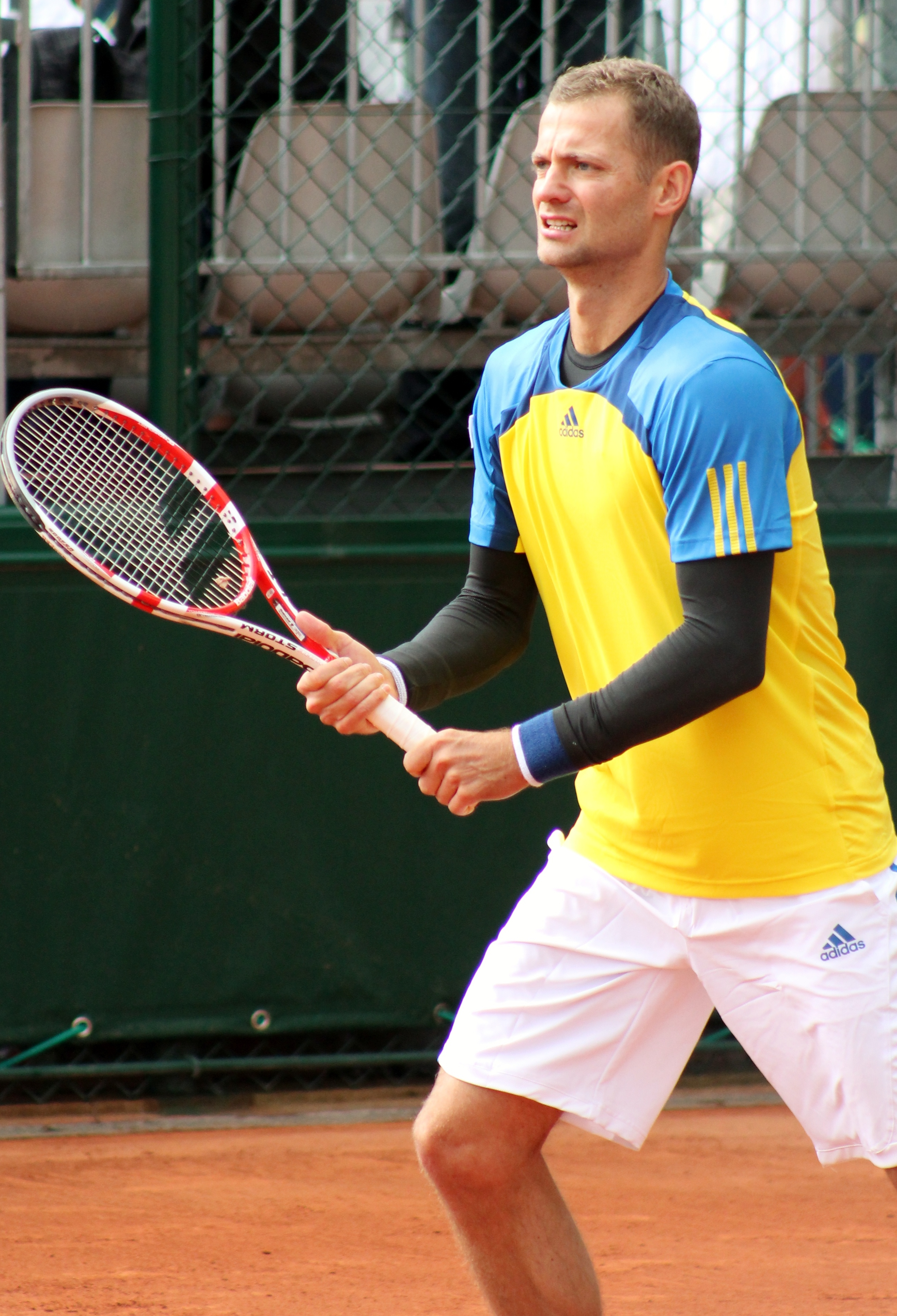
- Country (sports): Poland
- Residence: Warsaw, Poland
- Born: 8 July 1980 (age 45) Warsaw, Poland
- Height: 1.93 m (6 ft 4 in)
- Turned pro: 2001
- Retired: 2017
- Plays: Left-handed (two-handed backhand)
- Prize money: US$3,053,264

Singles
- Career record: 5–9
- Career titles: 0
- Highest ranking: No. 317 (12 August 2002)

Doubles
- Career record: 391–322
- Career titles: 18
- Highest ranking: No. 6 (6 August 2012)

Grand Slam doubles results
- Australian Open: SF (2006)
- French Open: QF (2010, 2013)
- Wimbledon: 2R (2004, 2005, 2007, 2010, 2015)
- US Open: F (2011)

Other doubles tournaments
- Tour Finals: F (2011)
- Olympic Games: QF (2008)

Grand Slam mixed doubles results
- Australian Open: 2R (2008, 2012)
- French Open: 2R (2006, 2008)
- Wimbledon: 3R (2010)
- US Open: QF (2007, 2009)

Mariusz Stanisław Fyrstenberg (born 8 July 1980) is a retired Polish tennis player who was a doubles specialist.

Fyrstenberg primarily partnered Marcin Matkowski. The pair won the Madrid Open twice, in addition to reaching the final at the US Open. They also reached the final of the ATP Finals and participated six times at the event overall. Fyrstenberg won 18 doubles title in his career and achieved a highest ranking in doubles of world No. 6 in August 2012.

He is currently the coach of Jan Zieliński and Hugo Nys.

== Significant finals ==
=== Grand Slam tournament finals ===
==== Doubles: 1 (runner-up) ====
Result	Year	Championship	Surface	Partner	Opponents	Score
Loss	2011	US Open	Hard	(Poland) Marcin Matkowski	(Austria) Jürgen Melzer (Germany) Philipp Petzschner	2–6, 2–6

=== Year-end championships ===
==== Doubles: 1 (runner-up) ====
Result	Year	Championship	Surface	Partner	Opponents	Score
Loss	2011	London, UK	Hard (i)	(Poland) Marcin Matkowski	(Belarus) Max Mirnyi (Canada) Daniel Nestor	5–7, 3–6

=== Masters 1000 finals ===
==== Doubles: 6 (2 titles, 4 runner-ups) ====
Result	Year	Tournament	Surface	Partner	Opponents	Score
Loss	2007	Madrid Open	Hard (i)	(Poland) Marcin Matkowski	(United States) Bob Bryan (United States) Mike Bryan	3–6, 6–7^{(4–7)}
Win	2008	Madrid Open	Hard (i)	(Poland) Marcin Matkowski	(India) Mahesh Bhupathi (The Bahamas) Mark Knowles	6–2, 6–4
Loss	2009	Shanghai Masters	Hard	(Poland) Marcin Matkowski	(France) Julien Benneteau (France) Jo-Wilfried Tsonga	2–6, 4–6
Loss	2010	Shanghai Masters	Hard	(Poland) Marcin Matkowski	(Austria) Jürgen Melzer (India) Leander Paes	5–7, 6–4, [5–10]
Win	2012	Madrid Open (2)	Clay	(Poland) Marcin Matkowski	(Sweden) Robert Lindstedt (Romania) Horia Tecău	6–3, 6–4
Loss	2013	Miami Open	Hard	(Poland) Marcin Matkowski	(Pakistan) Aisam-ul-Haq Qureshi (Netherlands) Jean-Julien Rojer	4–6, 1–6

== ATP career finals ==
=== Doubles: 44 (18 titles, 26 runner-ups) ===
Legend Grand Slam tournaments (0–1) Tennis Masters Cup / ATP World Tour Finals (0–1) ATP Masters Series / ATP World Tour Masters 1000 (2–4) ATP International Series Gold / ATP World Tour 500 Series (3–6) ATP International Series / ATP World Tour 250 Series (13–14)	Finals by surface Hard (7–17) Clay (9–8) Grass (2–0) Carpet (0–1)	Finals by setting Outdoor (12–19) Indoor (6–7)

Result	W–L	Date	Tournament	Tier	Surface	Partner	Opponents	Score
Win	1–0	Aug 2003	Sopot Open, Poland	International	Clay	(Poland) Marcin Matkowski	(Czech Republic) František Čermák (Czech Republic) Leoš Friedl	6–4, 6–7^{(7–9)}, 6–3
Win	2–0	Feb 2004	Brasil Open, Brazil	International	Clay	(Poland) Marcin Matkowski	(Germany) Tomas Behrend (Czech Republic) Leoš Friedl	6–2, 6–2
Win	3–0	Aug 2005	Sopot Open, Poland (2)	International	Clay	(Poland) Marcin Matkowski	(Argentina) Lucas Arnold Ker (Argentina) Sebastián Prieto	7–6^{(9–7)}, 6–4
Loss	3–1	Sep 2005	Campionati Internazionali di Sicilia, Italy	International	Clay	(Poland) Marcin Matkowski	(Argentina) Martín García (Argentina) Mariano Hood	2–6, 3–6
Loss	3–2	Feb 2006	Brasil Open, Brazil	International	Clay	(Poland) Marcin Matkowski	(Czech Republic) Lukáš Dlouhý (Czech Republic) Pavel Vízner	1–6, 6–4, [3–10]
Loss	3–3	Apr 2006	Barcelona Open, Spain	Intl. Gold	Clay	(Poland) Marcin Matkowski	(The Bahamas) Mark Knowles (Canada) Daniel Nestor	2–6, 7–6^{(7–4)}, [5–10]
Loss	3–4	Aug 2006	Connecticut Open, United States	International	Hard	(Poland) Marcin Matkowski	(Israel) Jonathan Erlich (Israel) Andy Ram	3–6, 3–6
Win	4–4	Sep 2006	Romanian Open, Romania	International	Clay	(Poland) Marcin Matkowski	(Argentina) Martín García (Peru) Luis Horna	6–7^{(5–7)}, 7–6^{(7–5)}, [10–8]
Loss	4–5	Oct 2006	Campionati Internazionali di Sicilia, Italy	International	Clay	(Poland) Marcin Matkowski	(Argentina) Martín García (Peru) Luis Horna	6–7^{(1–7)}, 6–7^{(2–7)}
Loss	4–6	Oct 2006	Swiss Indoors, Switzerland	International	Carpet (i)	(Poland) Marcin Matkowski	(The Bahamas) Mark Knowles (Canada) Daniel Nestor	6–4, 4–6, [8–10]
Win	5–6	Aug 2007	Sopot Open, Poland (3)	International	Clay	(Poland) Marcin Matkowski	(Argentina) Martín García (Argentina) Sebastián Prieto	6–1, 6–1
Loss	5–7	Aug 2007	Connecticut Open, United States	International	Hard	(Poland) Marcin Matkowski	(India) Mahesh Bhupathi (Serbia) Nenad Zimonjić	3–6, 3–6
Loss	5–8	Oct 2007	Open de Moselle, France	International	Hard (i)	(Poland) Marcin Matkowski	(France) Arnaud Clément (France) Michaël Llodra	1–6, 4–6
Win	6–8	Oct 2007	Vienna Open, Austria	Intl. Gold	Hard (i)	(Poland) Marcin Matkowski	(Germany) Tomas Behrend (Germany) Christopher Kas	6–4, 6–2
Loss	6–9	Oct 2007	Madrid Open, Spain	Masters	Hard (i)	(Poland) Marcin Matkowski	(United States) Bob Bryan (United States) Mike Bryan	3–6, 6–7^{(4–7)}
Loss	6–10	Apr 2008	Barcelona Open, Spain	Intl. Gold	Clay	(Poland) Marcin Matkowski	(United States) Bob Bryan (United States) Mike Bryan	3–6, 2–6
Win	7–10	Jun 2008	Warsaw Open, Poland (4)	International	Clay	(Poland) Marcin Matkowski	(Russia) Nikolay Davydenko (Kazakhstan) Yuri Schukin	6–0, 3–6, [10–4]
Loss	7–11	Sep 2008	Romanian Open, Romania	International	Clay	(Poland) Marcin Matkowski	(France) Nicolas Devilder (France) Paul-Henri Mathieu	6–7^{(4–7)}, 7–6^{(11–9)}, [20–22]
Loss	7–12	Oct 2008	Open de Moselle, France	International	Hard (i)	(Poland) Marcin Matkowski	(France) Arnaud Clément (France) Michaël Llodra	7–5, 3–6, [8–10]
Win	8–12	Oct 2008	Madrid Open, Spain	Masters	Hard (i)	(Poland) Marcin Matkowski	(India) Mahesh Bhupathi (The Bahamas) Mark Knowles	6–4, 6–2
Win	9–12	Jun 2009	Eastbourne International, United Kingdom	250 Series	Grass	(Poland) Marcin Matkowski	(United States) Travis Parrott (Slovakia) Filip Polášek	6–4, 6–4
Loss	9–13	Aug 2009	Washington Open, United States	500 Series	Hard	(Poland) Marcin Matkowski	(Czech Republic) Martin Damm (Sweden) Robert Lindstedt	7–5, 7–6^{(7–3)}
Win	10–13	Oct 2009	Malaysian Open, Malaysia	250 Series	Hard (i)	(Poland) Marcin Matkowski	(Russia) Igor Kunitsyn (Czech Republic) Jaroslav Levinský	6–2, 6–1
Loss	10–14	Oct 2009	Shanghai Masters, China	Masters 1000	Hard	(Poland) Marcin Matkowski	(France) Julien Benneteau (France) Jo-Wilfried Tsonga	2–6, 4–6
Win	11–14	Jun 2010	Eastbourne International, United Kingdom (2)	250 Series	Grass	(Poland) Marcin Matkowski	(United Kingdom) Colin Fleming (United Kingdom) Ken Skupski	6–3, 5–7, [10–8]
Loss	11–15	Oct 2010	Malaysian Open, Malaysia	250 Series	Hard (i)	(Poland) Marcin Matkowski	(Czech Republic) František Čermák (Slovakia) Michal Mertiňák	6–7^{(3–7)}, 6–7^{(5–7)}
Loss	11–16	Oct 2010	China Open, China	500 Series	Hard	(Poland) Marcin Matkowski	(United States) Bob Bryan (United States) Mike Bryan	1–6, 6–7^{(5–7)}
Loss	11–17	Oct 2010	Shanghai Masters, China	Masters 1000	Hard	(Poland) Marcin Matkowski	(Austria) Jürgen Melzer (India) Leander Paes	5–7, 6–4, [5–10]
Loss	11–18	Oct 2010	Vienna Open, Austria	250 Series	Hard (i)	(Poland) Marcin Matkowski	(Canada) Daniel Nestor (Serbia) Nenad Zimonjić	5–7, 6–3, [5–10]
Loss	11–19	Sep 2011	US Open, United States	Grand Slam	Hard	(Poland) Marcin Matkowski	(Austria) Jürgen Melzer (Germany) Philipp Petzschner	2–6, 2–6
Loss	11–20	Nov 2011	ATP World Tour Finals, United Kingdom	Tour Finals	Hard (i)	(Poland) Marcin Matkowski	(Belarus) Max Mirnyi (Canada) Daniel Nestor	5–7, 3–6
Loss	11–21	Mar 2012	Dubai Tennis Championships, UAE	500 Series	Hard	(Poland) Marcin Matkowski	(India) Mahesh Bhupathi (India) Rohan Bopanna	4–6, 6–3, [5–10]
Win	12–21	Apr 2012	Barcelona Open, Spain	500 Series	Clay	(Poland) Marcin Matkowski	(Spain) Marcel Granollers (Spain) Marc López	2–6, 7–6^{(9–7)}, [10–8]
Win	13–21	May 2012	Madrid Open, Spain (2)	Masters 1000	Clay	(Poland) Marcin Matkowski	(Sweden) Robert Lindstedt (Romania) Horia Tecău	6–3, 6–4
Loss	13–22	Mar 2013	Miami Open, United States	Masters 1000	Hard	(Poland) Marcin Matkowski	(Pakistan) Aisam-ul-Haq Qureshi (Netherlands) Jean-Julien Rojer	4–6, 1–6
Win	14–22	Jul 2013	German Open, Germany	500 Series	Clay	(Poland) Marcin Matkowski	(Austria) Alexander Peya (Brazil) Bruno Soares	3–6, 6–1, [10–8]
Win	15–22	Jan 2014	Brisbane International, Australia	250 Series	Hard	(Canada) Daniel Nestor	(Colombia) Juan Sebastián Cabal (Colombia) Robert Farah	6–7^{(4–7)}, 6–4, [10–7]
Loss	15–23	Apr 2014	Romanian Open, Romania	250 Series	Clay	(Poland) Marcin Matkowski	(Netherlands) Jean-Julien Rojer (Romania) Horia Tecău	4–6, 4–6
Win	16–23	Sep 2014	Moselle Open, France	250 Series	Hard (i)	(Poland) Marcin Matkowski	(Croatia) Marin Draganja (Finland) Henri Kontinen	6–7^{(3–7)}, 6–3, [10–8]
Win	17–23	Feb 2015	Memphis Open, United States	250 Series	Hard (i)	(Mexico) Santiago González	(New Zealand) Artem Sitak (United States) Donald Young	5–7, 7–6^{(7–1)}, [10–8]
Loss	17–24	Feb 2015	Mexican Open, Mexico	500 Series	Hard	(Mexico) Santiago González	(Croatia) Ivan Dodig (Brazil) Marcelo Melo	6–7^{(2–7)}, 7–5, [3–10]
Loss	17–25	Jul 2015	Croatia Open, Croatia	250 Series	Clay	(Mexico) Santiago González	(Argentina) Máximo González (Brazil) André Sá	6–4, 3–6, [5–10]
Win	18–25	Feb 2016	Memphis Open, United States (2)	250 Series	Hard (i)	(Mexico) Santiago González	(United States) Steve Johnson (United States) Sam Querrey	6–4, 6–4
Loss	18–26	Oct 2016	Chengdu Open, China	250 Series	Hard	(Spain) Pablo Carreño Busta	(South Africa) Raven Klaasen (United States) Rajeev Ram	6–7^{(2–7)}, 5–7

== Performance timeline ==
=== Doubles ===
Key
W	F	SF	QF	#R	RR	Q#	DNQ	A	NH

(W) winner; (F) finalist; (SF) semifinalist; (QF) quarterfinalist; (#R) rounds 4, 3, 2, 1; (RR) round-robin stage; (Q#) qualification round; (DNQ) did not qualify; (A) absent; (NH) not held; (SR) strike rate (events won / competed); (W–L) win–loss record.

Tournament	2002	2003	2004	2005	2006	2007	2008	2009	2010	2011	2012	2013	2014	2015	2016	SR	W–L
Grand Slam tournaments
Australian Open	A	A	A	1R	SF	1R	3R	QF	2R	QF	QF	1R	3R	1R	A	0 / 11	18–11
French Open	A	A	3R	3R	2R	1R	2R	2R	QF	1R	3R	QF	1R	A	1R	0 / 12	15–12
Wimbledon	A	A	2R	2R	1R	1R	1R	1R	2R	1R	1R	A	1R	2R	A	0 / 11	5–11
US Open	A	A	2R	1R	3R	3R	1R	1R	QF	F	1R	1R	3R	2R	1R	0 / 13	16–13
Win–loss	0–0	0–0	4–3	3–4	7–4	2–4	3–4	4–4	8–4	8–4	5–4	3–3	4–4	2-3	0-2	0 / 47	53–47
Year-end championships
ATP World Tour Finals	A	A	A	A	RR	A	SF	RR	SF	F	A	RR	A	A	A	0 / 6	9–13
ATP Masters Series 1000
Indian Wells	A	A	1R	A	2R	2R	1R	QF	1R	1R	SF	1R	1R	A	A	0 / 10	6–10
Miami	A	A	1R	A	1R	1R	2R	1R	SF	1R	1R	F	1R	A	A	0 / 10	7–10
Monte Carlo	A	A	2R	A	QF	2R	2R	QF	2R	SF	2R	2R	2R	A	A	0 / 10	10–10
Rome	A	A	A	A	2R	A	QF	QF	1R	2R	QF	1R	1R	A	A	0 / 8	5–7
Hamburg	A	A	A	A	2R	2R	2R	Held as Madrid (Clay)								0 / 3	3–3
Madrid (Clay)	Held as Hamburg							2R	QF	QF	W	2R	QF	A	A	1 / 6	9–5
Canada	A	A	A	A	1R	1R	1R	QF	2R	QF	QF	SF	2R	A	A	0 / 9	1–9
Cincinnati	A	A	A	A	1R	2R	QF	QF	QF	QF	QF	QF	1R	A	A	0 / 9	7–9
Madrid (Hard)	A	A	A	A	QF	F	W	Held as Shanghai								1 / 3	9–2
Shanghai	Not Held							F	F	SF	2R	2R	A	A	A	0 / 5	8–5
Paris	A	A	A	A	QF	2R	SF	SF	2R	QF	QF	2R	A	A	A	0 / 8	10–9
Win–loss	0–0	0–0	1–3	0–0	7–9	9–8	13–8	10–9	8–9	8–9	9–8	11-9	4–7	0–0	0-0	2 / 81	80–79
Olympic Games
Doubles	Not Held		1R	Not Held			QF	Not Held			1R	Not Held			A	0 / 3	2–3
Career statistics
Titles/Finals	0–0	1–1	1–1	1–2	1–6	2–5	2–5	2–4	1–5	0–2	2–3	1-2	1–2	1–2	1-2	17–42	
Year-end ranking	160	84	49	54	16	24	15	18	12	14	15	20	44	56	58		

== See also ==
Poland Davis Cup team
