= 2010 ATP World Tour =

Men's tennis circuit

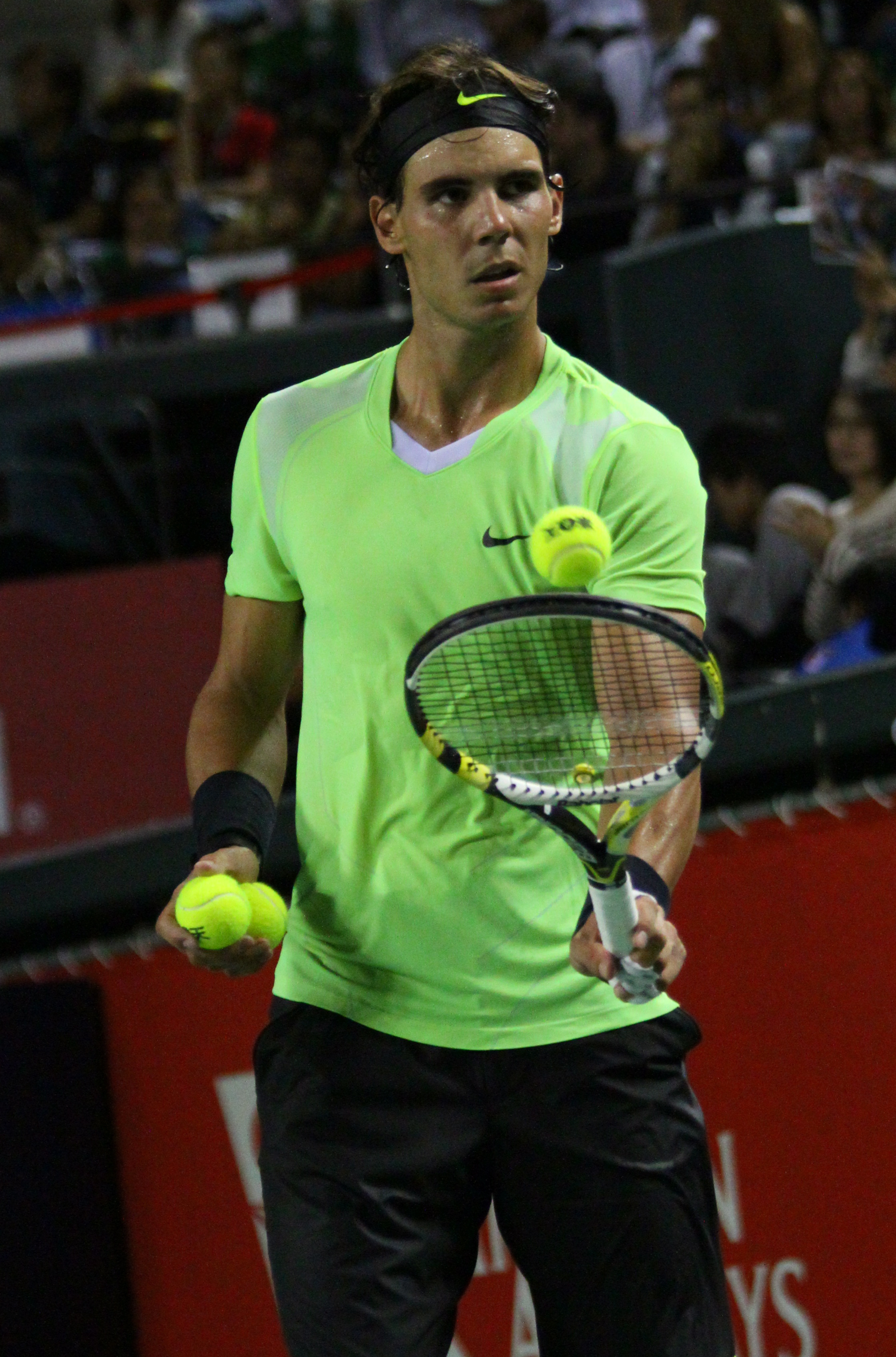
- Rafael Nadal finished the year as world No. 1 for the second time in his career. He won seven singles tournaments during the season, including three majors at the French Open, the Wimbledon Championships, and the US Open (completing the career Golden Slam). He also won three Masters 1000 singles events.

Details
- Duration: January 2, 2010 – November 29, 2010
- Edition: 41st
- Tournaments: 70

Achievements (singles)
- Most titles: (Spain) Rafael Nadal (7)
- Most finals: (Switzerland) Roger Federer (Spain) Rafael Nadal (9)
- Prize money leader: (Spain) Rafael Nadal ($10,171,998)
- Points leader: (Spain) Rafael Nadal (12,450)

Awards
- Player of the year: (Spain) Rafael Nadal
- Doubles team of the year: (United States) Bob Bryan (United States) Mike Bryan
- Most improved player of the year: (Kazakhstan) Andrey Golubev
- Newcomer of the year: (Germany) Tobias Kamke
- Comeback player of the year: (Netherlands) Robin Haase

The Association of Tennis Professionals (ATP) World Tour is the elite professional tennis circuit organized by the ATP. The 2010 ATP World Tour calendar comprises the Grand Slam tournaments (supervised by the International Tennis Federation (ITF)), the ATP World Tour Masters 1000, the ATP World Tour 500 series, the ATP World Tour 250 series, the ATP World Team Championship, the Davis Cup (organized by the ITF), and the ATP World Tour Finals. Also included in the 2010 calendar is the Hopman Cup, which does not distribute ranking points, and is organized by the ITF.

== Schedule ==
This is the complete schedule of events on the 2010 calendar, with player progression documented from the quarterfinals stage.

Key

Grand Slam
ATP World Tour Finals
ATP World Tour Masters 1000
ATP World Tour 500
ATP World Tour 250
Team Events

=== January ===
| Week | Tournament | Champions | Runners-up | Semifinalists | Quarterfinalists |
|---|---|---|---|---|---|
| 4 Jan | Hyundai Hopman Cup; Perth, Australia; ITF Mixed Team Championships; Hard (i) – A$1,000,000 – 8 teams (RR) | Spain; 2–1 | Great Britain | Round Robin losers (Group A) Romania; United States; Australia | Round Robin losers (Group B) Kazakhstan; Russia; Germany |
| 4 Jan | Brisbane International; Brisbane, Australia; ATP World Tour 250; Hard – $372,500 – 32S/16D; Singles – Doubles | (United States) Andy Roddick; 7–6^{(7–2)}, 7–6^{(9–7)} | (Czech Republic) Radek Štěpánek | (Czech Republic) Tomáš Berdych (France) Gaël Monfils | (France) Richard Gasquet (Brazil) Thomaz Bellucci (United States) James Blake (United States) Wayne Odesnik |
| 4 Jan | Brisbane International; Brisbane, Australia; ATP World Tour 250; Hard – $372,500 – 32S/16D; Singles – Doubles | (France) Jérémy Chardy (France) Marc Gicquel; 6–3, 7–6^{(7–5)} | (Czech Republic) Lukáš Dlouhý (India) Leander Paes | (Czech Republic) Tomáš Berdych (France) Gaël Monfils | (France) Richard Gasquet (Brazil) Thomaz Bellucci (United States) James Blake (United States) Wayne Odesnik |
| 4 Jan | Aircel Chennai Open; Chennai, India; ATP World Tour 250; Hard – $398,250 – 32S/16D; Singles – Doubles | (Croatia) Marin Čilić; 7–6^{(7–2)}, 7–6^{(7–3)} | (Switzerland) Stanislas Wawrinka | (Israel) Dudi Sela (Serbia) Janko Tipsarević | (Slovakia) Lukáš Lacko (Germany) Michael Berrer (Netherlands) Thiemo de Bakker (Colombia) Santiago Giraldo |
| 4 Jan | Aircel Chennai Open; Chennai, India; ATP World Tour 250; Hard – $398,250 – 32S/16D; Singles – Doubles | (Spain) Marcel Granollers (Spain) Santiago Ventura; 7–5, 6–2 | (Chinese Taipei) Lu Yen-hsun (Serbia) Janko Tipsarević | (Israel) Dudi Sela (Serbia) Janko Tipsarević | (Slovakia) Lukáš Lacko (Germany) Michael Berrer (Netherlands) Thiemo de Bakker (Colombia) Santiago Giraldo |
| 4 Jan | Qatar ExxonMobil Open; Doha, Qatar; ATP World Tour 250; Hard – $1,024,000 – 32S/16D; Singles – Doubles | (Russia) Nikolay Davydenko; 0–6, 7–6^{(10–8)}, 6–4 | (Spain) Rafael Nadal | (Switzerland) Roger Federer (Serbia) Viktor Troicki | (Latvia) Ernests Gulbis (Croatia) Ivo Karlović (Poland) Łukasz Kubot (Belgium) Steve Darcis |
| 4 Jan | Qatar ExxonMobil Open; Doha, Qatar; ATP World Tour 250; Hard – $1,024,000 – 32S/16D; Singles – Doubles | (Spain) Guillermo García López (Spain) Albert Montañés; 6–4, 7–5 | (Czech Republic) František Čermák (Slovakia) Michal Mertiňák | (Switzerland) Roger Federer (Serbia) Viktor Troicki | (Latvia) Ernests Gulbis (Croatia) Ivo Karlović (Poland) Łukasz Kubot (Belgium) Steve Darcis |
| 11 Jan | Medibank International Sydney; Sydney, Australia; ATP World Tour 250; Hard – $372,500 – 28S/16D; Singles – Doubles | (Cyprus) Marcos Baghdatis; 6–4, 7–6^{(7–2)} | (France) Richard Gasquet | (France) Julien Benneteau (United States) Mardy Fish | (Italy) Potito Starace (Argentina) Leonardo Mayer (Australia) Lleyton Hewitt (Australia) Peter Luczak |
| 11 Jan | Medibank International Sydney; Sydney, Australia; ATP World Tour 250; Hard – $372,500 – 28S/16D; Singles – Doubles | (Canada) Daniel Nestor (Serbia) Nenad Zimonjić; 6–3, 7–6^{(7–5)} | (United Kingdom) Ross Hutchins (Australia) Jordan Kerr | (France) Julien Benneteau (United States) Mardy Fish | (Italy) Potito Starace (Argentina) Leonardo Mayer (Australia) Lleyton Hewitt (Australia) Peter Luczak |
| 11 Jan | Heineken Open; Auckland, New Zealand; ATP World Tour 250; Hard – $355,500 – 28S/16D; Singles – Doubles | (United States) John Isner; 6–3, 5–7, 7–6^{(7–2)} | (France) Arnaud Clément | (Spain) Albert Montañés (Germany) Philipp Kohlschreiber | (Spain) Tommy Robredo (Switzerland) Michael Lammer (France) Marc Gicquel (Austria) Jürgen Melzer |
| 11 Jan | Heineken Open; Auckland, New Zealand; ATP World Tour 250; Hard – $355,500 – 28S/16D; Singles – Doubles | (New Zealand) Marcus Daniell (Romania) Horia Tecău; 7–5, 6–4 | (Brazil) Marcelo Melo (Brazil) Bruno Soares | (Spain) Albert Montañés (Germany) Philipp Kohlschreiber | (Spain) Tommy Robredo (Switzerland) Michael Lammer (France) Marc Gicquel (Austria) Jürgen Melzer |
| 18 Jan; 25 Jan | Australian Open; Melbourne, Australia; Grand Slam; Hard – A$10,712,240; 128S/64D/32X; Singles – Doubles – Mixed doubles | (Switzerland) Roger Federer; 6–3, 6–4, 7–6^{(13–11)} | (United Kingdom) Andy Murray | (France) Jo-Wilfried Tsonga (Croatia) Marin Čilić | (Russia) Nikolay Davydenko (Serbia) Novak Djokovic (United States) Andy Roddick (Spain) Rafael Nadal |
| 18 Jan; 25 Jan | Australian Open; Melbourne, Australia; Grand Slam; Hard – A$10,712,240; 128S/64D/32X; Singles – Doubles – Mixed doubles | (United States) Bob Bryan (United States) Mike Bryan; 6–3, 6–7^{(5–7)}, 6–3 | (Canada) Daniel Nestor (Serbia) Nenad Zimonjić | (France) Jo-Wilfried Tsonga (Croatia) Marin Čilić | (Russia) Nikolay Davydenko (Serbia) Novak Djokovic (United States) Andy Roddick (Spain) Rafael Nadal |
| 18 Jan; 25 Jan | Australian Open; Melbourne, Australia; Grand Slam; Hard – A$10,712,240; 128S/64D/32X; Singles – Doubles – Mixed doubles | (India) Leander Paes (Zimbabwe) Cara Black; 7–5, 6–3 | (Czech Republic) Jaroslav Levinský (Russia) Ekaterina Makarova | (France) Jo-Wilfried Tsonga (Croatia) Marin Čilić | (Russia) Nikolay Davydenko (Serbia) Novak Djokovic (United States) Andy Roddick (Spain) Rafael Nadal |

=== February ===
| Week | Tournament | Champions | Runners-up | Semifinalists | Quarterfinalists |
|---|---|---|---|---|---|
| 1 Feb | SA Tennis Open; Johannesburg, South Africa; ATP World Tour 250; Hard – $442,500 – 32S/16D; Singles – Doubles | (Spain) Feliciano López; 7–5, 6–1 | (France) Stéphane Robert | (France) Gaël Monfils (Spain) David Ferrer | (Chinese Taipei) Lu Yen-hsun (United States) Rajeev Ram (Jamaica) Dustin Brown (India) Somdev Devvarman |
| 1 Feb | SA Tennis Open; Johannesburg, South Africa; ATP World Tour 250; Hard – $442,500 – 32S/16D; Singles – Doubles | (India) Rohan Bopanna (Pakistan) Aisam-ul-Haq Qureshi; 2–6, 6–3, [10–5] | (Slovakia) Karol Beck (Israel) Harel Levy | (France) Gaël Monfils (Spain) David Ferrer | (Chinese Taipei) Lu Yen-hsun (United States) Rajeev Ram (Jamaica) Dustin Brown (India) Somdev Devvarman |
| 1 Feb | PBZ Zagreb Indoors; Zagreb, Croatia; ATP World Tour 250; Hard (i) – €398,250 – 32S/16D; Singles – Doubles | (Croatia) Marin Čilić; 6–4, 6–7^{(5–7)}, 6–3 | (Germany) Michael Berrer | (Austria) Jürgen Melzer (Germany) Philipp Petzschner | (Croatia) Ivo Karlović (Ukraine) Illya Marchenko (Serbia) Viktor Troicki (Slovakia) Lukáš Lacko |
| 1 Feb | PBZ Zagreb Indoors; Zagreb, Croatia; ATP World Tour 250; Hard (i) – €398,250 – 32S/16D; Singles – Doubles | (Austria) Jürgen Melzer (Germany) Philipp Petzschner; 3–6, 6–3, [10–8] | (France) Arnaud Clément (Belgium) Olivier Rochus | (Austria) Jürgen Melzer (Germany) Philipp Petzschner | (Croatia) Ivo Karlović (Ukraine) Illya Marchenko (Serbia) Viktor Troicki (Slovakia) Lukáš Lacko |
| 1 Feb | Movistar Open; Santiago, Chile; ATP World Tour 250; Clay (red) – $398,250 – 32S/16D; Singles – Doubles | (Brazil) Thomaz Bellucci; 6–2, 0–6, 6–4 | (Argentina) Juan Mónaco | (Chile) Fernando González (Brazil) João Souza | (Spain) Marcel Granollers (Argentina) Eduardo Schwank (Spain) Alberto Martín (Australia) Peter Luczak |
| 1 Feb | Movistar Open; Santiago, Chile; ATP World Tour 250; Clay (red) – $398,250 – 32S/16D; Singles – Doubles | (Poland) Łukasz Kubot (Austria) Oliver Marach; 6–4, 6–0 | (Italy) Potito Starace (Argentina) Horacio Zeballos | (Chile) Fernando González (Brazil) João Souza | (Spain) Marcel Granollers (Argentina) Eduardo Schwank (Spain) Alberto Martín (Australia) Peter Luczak |
| 8 Feb | ABN AMRO World Tennis Tournament; Rotterdam, Netherlands; ATP World Tour 500; Hard (i) – €1,150,000 – 32S/16D; Singles – Doubles | (Sweden) Robin Söderling; 6–4, 2–0 retired^{[a]} | (Russia) Mikhail Youzhny | (Serbia) Novak Djokovic (Russia) Nikolay Davydenko | (Germany) Florian Mayer (France) Gaël Monfils (France) Julien Benneteau (Austria) Jürgen Melzer |
| 8 Feb | ABN AMRO World Tennis Tournament; Rotterdam, Netherlands; ATP World Tour 500; Hard (i) – €1,150,000 – 32S/16D; Singles – Doubles | (Canada) Daniel Nestor (Serbia) Nenad Zimonjić; 6–4, 4–6, [10–7] | (Sweden) Simon Aspelin (Australia) Paul Hanley | (Serbia) Novak Djokovic (Russia) Nikolay Davydenko | (Germany) Florian Mayer (France) Gaël Monfils (France) Julien Benneteau (Austria) Jürgen Melzer |
| 8 Feb | SAP Open; San Jose, United States; ATP World Tour 250; Hard (i) – $531,000 – 32S/16D; Singles – Doubles | (Spain) Fernando Verdasco; 3–6, 6–4, 6–4 | (United States) Andy Roddick | (United States) Sam Querrey (Uzbekistan) Denis Istomin | (Czech Republic) Tomáš Berdych (United States) Michael Russell (Germany) Philipp Kohlschreiber (Lithuania) Ričardas Berankis |
| 8 Feb | SAP Open; San Jose, United States; ATP World Tour 250; Hard (i) – $531,000 – 32S/16D; Singles – Doubles | (United States) Mardy Fish (United States) Sam Querrey; 7–6^{(7–3)}, 7–5 | (Germany) Benjamin Becker (Argentina) Leonardo Mayer | (United States) Sam Querrey (Uzbekistan) Denis Istomin | (Czech Republic) Tomáš Berdych (United States) Michael Russell (Germany) Philipp Kohlschreiber (Lithuania) Ričardas Berankis |
| 8 Feb | Brasil Open; Costa do Sauípe, Brazil; ATP World Tour 250; Clay (red) – $442,500 – 32S/16D; Singles – Doubles | (Spain) Juan Carlos Ferrero; 6–1, 6–0 | (Poland) Łukasz Kubot | (Brazil) Ricardo Mello (Russia) Igor Andreev | (Argentina) Carlos Berlocq (Brazil) Thomaz Bellucci (Uruguay) Pablo Cuevas (Italy) Fabio Fognini |
| 8 Feb | Brasil Open; Costa do Sauípe, Brazil; ATP World Tour 250; Clay (red) – $442,500 – 32S/16D; Singles – Doubles | (Uruguay) Pablo Cuevas (Spain) Marcel Granollers; 7–5, 6–4 | (Poland) Łukasz Kubot (Austria) Oliver Marach | (Brazil) Ricardo Mello (Russia) Igor Andreev | (Argentina) Carlos Berlocq (Brazil) Thomaz Bellucci (Uruguay) Pablo Cuevas (Italy) Fabio Fognini |
| 15 Feb | Regions Morgan Keegan Championships; Memphis, United States; ATP World Tour 500; Hard (i) – $1,100,000 – 32S/16D; Singles – Doubles | (United States) Sam Querrey; 6–7^{(3–7)}, 7–6^{(7–5)}, 6–3 | (United States) John Isner | (Latvia) Ernests Gulbis (Germany) Philipp Petzschner | (United States) Andy Roddick (Czech Republic) Tomáš Berdych (Croatia) Ivo Karlović (Slovakia) Lukáš Lacko |
| 15 Feb | Regions Morgan Keegan Championships; Memphis, United States; ATP World Tour 500; Hard (i) – $1,100,000 – 32S/16D; Singles – Doubles | (United States) John Isner (United States) Sam Querrey; 6–4, 6–4 | (United Kingdom) Ross Hutchins (Australia) Jordan Kerr | (Latvia) Ernests Gulbis (Germany) Philipp Petzschner | (United States) Andy Roddick (Czech Republic) Tomáš Berdych (Croatia) Ivo Karlović (Slovakia) Lukáš Lacko |
| 15 Feb | Open 13; Marseille, France; ATP World Tour 250; Hard (i) – €512,750 – 28S/16D; Singles – Doubles | (France) Michaël Llodra; 6–3, 6–4 | (France) Julien Benneteau | (Germany) Mischa Zverev (France) Jo-Wilfried Tsonga | (Sweden) Robin Söderling (France) Guillaume Rufin (France) Gaël Monfils (Ukraine) Illya Marchenko |
| 15 Feb | Open 13; Marseille, France; ATP World Tour 250; Hard (i) – €512,750 – 28S/16D; Singles – Doubles | (France) Julien Benneteau (France) Michaël Llodra; 6–4, 6–3 | (Austria) Julian Knowle (Sweden) Robert Lindstedt | (Germany) Mischa Zverev (France) Jo-Wilfried Tsonga | (Sweden) Robin Söderling (France) Guillaume Rufin (France) Gaël Monfils (Ukraine) Illya Marchenko |
| 15 Feb | Copa Telmex; Buenos Aires, Argentina; ATP World Tour 250; Clay (red) – $475,300 – 32S/16D; Singles – Doubles | (Spain) Juan Carlos Ferrero; 5–7, 6–4, 6–3 | (Spain) David Ferrer | (Spain) Albert Montañés (Argentina) Juan Mónaco | (Russia) Igor Andreev (Argentina) David Nalbandian (Argentina) Horacio Zeballos (Spain) Santiago Ventura |
| 15 Feb | Copa Telmex; Buenos Aires, Argentina; ATP World Tour 250; Clay (red) – $475,300 – 32S/16D; Singles – Doubles | (Argentina) Sebastián Prieto (Argentina) Horacio Zeballos; 7–6^{(7–4)}, 6–3 | (Germany) Simon Greul (Australia) Peter Luczak | (Spain) Albert Montañés (Argentina) Juan Mónaco | (Russia) Igor Andreev (Argentina) David Nalbandian (Argentina) Horacio Zeballos (Spain) Santiago Ventura |
| 22 Feb | Barclays Dubai Tennis Championships; Dubai, United Arab Emirates; ATP World Tour 500; Hard – $1,619,500 – 32S/16D; Singles – Doubles | (Serbia) Novak Djokovic; 7–5, 5–7, 6–3 | (Russia) Mikhail Youzhny | (Austria) Jürgen Melzer (Cyprus) Marcos Baghdatis | (Croatia) Marin Čilić (Serbia) Janko Tipsarević (Germany) Michael Berrer (Croatia) Ivan Ljubičić |
| 22 Feb | Barclays Dubai Tennis Championships; Dubai, United Arab Emirates; ATP World Tour 500; Hard – $1,619,500 – 32S/16D; Singles – Doubles | (Sweden) Simon Aspelin (Australia) Paul Hanley; 6–2, 6–3 | (Czech Republic) Lukáš Dlouhý (India) Leander Paes | (Austria) Jürgen Melzer (Cyprus) Marcos Baghdatis | (Croatia) Marin Čilić (Serbia) Janko Tipsarević (Germany) Michael Berrer (Croatia) Ivan Ljubičić |
| 22 Feb | Abierto Mexicano Telcel; Acapulco, Mexico; ATP World Tour 500; Clay (red) – $955,000 – 32S/16D; Singles – Doubles | (Spain) David Ferrer; 6–3, 3–6, 6–1 | (Spain) Juan Carlos Ferrero | (Argentina) Juan Mónaco (Chile) Fernando González | (Spain) Fernando Verdasco (Spain) Nicolás Almagro (Uruguay) Pablo Cuevas (Argentina) Eduardo Schwank |
| 22 Feb | Abierto Mexicano Telcel; Acapulco, Mexico; ATP World Tour 500; Clay (red) – $955,000 – 32S/16D; Singles – Doubles | (Poland) Łukasz Kubot (Austria) Oliver Marach; 6–0, 6–0 | (Italy) Fabio Fognini (Italy) Potito Starace | (Argentina) Juan Mónaco (Chile) Fernando González | (Spain) Fernando Verdasco (Spain) Nicolás Almagro (Uruguay) Pablo Cuevas (Argentina) Eduardo Schwank |
| 22 Feb | Delray Beach International Tennis Championships; Delray Beach, United States; ATP World Tour 250; Hard – $442,500 – 32S/16D; Singles – Doubles | (Latvia) Ernests Gulbis; 6–2, 6–3 | (Croatia) Ivo Karlović | (Finland) Jarkko Nieminen (United States) Mardy Fish | (Argentina) Leonardo Mayer (Germany) Benjamin Becker (France) Jérémy Chardy (United States) James Blake |
| 22 Feb | Delray Beach International Tennis Championships; Delray Beach, United States; ATP World Tour 250; Hard – $442,500 – 32S/16D; Singles – Doubles | (United States) Bob Bryan (United States) Mike Bryan; 6–3, 7–6^{(7–3)} | (Germany) Philipp Marx (Slovakia) Igor Zelenay | (Finland) Jarkko Nieminen (United States) Mardy Fish | (Argentina) Leonardo Mayer (Germany) Benjamin Becker (France) Jérémy Chardy (United States) James Blake |

=== March ===
| Week | Tournament | Champions | Runners-up | Semifinalists | Quarterfinalists |
|---|---|---|---|---|---|
| 1 Mar | Davis Cup by BNP Paribas First Round; Logroño, Spain – clay (red); Toulon, France – hard (i); Moscow, Russia – hard (i); Stockholm, Sweden – hard (i); Varaždin, Croatia – hard (i); Belgrade, Serbia – clay (red) (i); Coquimbo, Chile – clay (red); Bree, Belgium – clay (red) (i) | First round winners Spain 4–1; France 4–1; Russia 3–2; Argentina 3–2; Croatia 5–0; Serbia 3–2; Chile 4–1; Czech Republic 4–1 | First round losers Switzerland; Germany; India; Sweden; Ecuador; United States; Israel; Belgium | | |
| 8 Mar; 15 Mar | BNP Paribas Open; Indian Wells, United States; ATP World Tour Masters 1000; Hard – $3,645,000 – 96S/32D; Singles – Doubles | (Croatia) Ivan Ljubičić; 7–6^{(7–3)}, 7–6^{(7–5)} | (United States) Andy Roddick | (Sweden) Robin Söderling (Spain) Rafael Nadal | (Spain) Tommy Robredo (United Kingdom) Andy Murray (Czech Republic) Tomáš Berdych (Argentina) Juan Mónaco |
| 8 Mar; 15 Mar | BNP Paribas Open; Indian Wells, United States; ATP World Tour Masters 1000; Hard – $3,645,000 – 96S/32D; Singles – Doubles | (Spain) Marc López (Spain) Rafael Nadal; 7–6^{(10–8)}, 6–3 | (Canada) Daniel Nestor (Serbia) Nenad Zimonjić | (Sweden) Robin Söderling (Spain) Rafael Nadal | (Spain) Tommy Robredo (United Kingdom) Andy Murray (Czech Republic) Tomáš Berdych (Argentina) Juan Mónaco |
| 22 Mar; 29 Mar | Sony Ericsson Open; Key Biscayne, United States; ATP World Tour Masters 1000; Hard – $3,645,000 – 96S/32D; Singles – Doubles | (United States) Andy Roddick; 7–5, 6–4 | (Czech Republic) Tomáš Berdych | (Sweden) Robin Söderling (Spain) Rafael Nadal | (Spain) Fernando Verdasco (Russia) Mikhail Youzhny (France) Jo-Wilfried Tsonga (Spain) Nicolás Almagro |
| 22 Mar; 29 Mar | Sony Ericsson Open; Key Biscayne, United States; ATP World Tour Masters 1000; Hard – $3,645,000 – 96S/32D; Singles – Doubles | (Czech Republic) Lukáš Dlouhý (India) Leander Paes; 6–2, 7–5 | (India) Mahesh Bhupathi (Belarus) Max Mirnyi | (Sweden) Robin Söderling (Spain) Rafael Nadal | (Spain) Fernando Verdasco (Russia) Mikhail Youzhny (France) Jo-Wilfried Tsonga (Spain) Nicolás Almagro |

=== April ===
| Week | Tournament | Champions | Runners-up | Semifinalists | Quarterfinalists |
|---|---|---|---|---|---|
| 5 Apr | Grand Prix Hassan II; Casablanca, Morocco; ATP World Tour 250; Clay (red) – €398,250 – 28S/16D; Singles – Doubles | (Switzerland) Stanislas Wawrinka; 6–2, 6–3 | (Romania) Victor Hănescu | (Italy) Potito Starace (France) Florent Serra | (Morocco) Reda El Amrani (Poland) Łukasz Kubot (France) Richard Gasquet (Spain) Guillermo García López |
| 5 Apr | Grand Prix Hassan II; Casablanca, Morocco; ATP World Tour 250; Clay (red) – €398,250 – 28S/16D; Singles – Doubles | (Sweden) Robert Lindstedt (Romania) Horia Tecău; 6–2, 3–6, [10–7] | (India) Rohan Bopanna (Pakistan) Aisam-ul-Haq Qureshi | (Italy) Potito Starace (France) Florent Serra | (Morocco) Reda El Amrani (Poland) Łukasz Kubot (France) Richard Gasquet (Spain) Guillermo García López |
| 5 Apr | US Men's Clay Court Championships; Houston, United States; ATP World Tour 250; Clay – $442,500 (maroon) – 28S/16D; Singles – Doubles | (Argentina) Juan Ignacio Chela; 5–7, 6–4, 6–3 | (United States) Sam Querrey | (Argentina) Horacio Zeballos (United States) Wayne Odesnik | (Chile) Fernando González (Australia) Lleyton Hewitt (Chile) Nicolás Massú (Belgium) Xavier Malisse |
| 5 Apr | US Men's Clay Court Championships; Houston, United States; ATP World Tour 250; Clay – $442,500 (maroon) – 28S/16D; Singles – Doubles | (United States) Bob Bryan (United States) Mike Bryan; 6–3, 7–5 | (Australia) Stephen Huss (South Africa) Wesley Moodie | (Argentina) Horacio Zeballos (United States) Wayne Odesnik | (Chile) Fernando González (Australia) Lleyton Hewitt (Chile) Nicolás Massú (Belgium) Xavier Malisse |
| 12 Apr | Monte-Carlo Rolex Masters; Roquebrune-Cap-Martin, France; ATP World Tour Masters 1000; Clay (red) – €2,227,500 – 56S/24D; Singles – Doubles | (Spain) Rafael Nadal; 6–0, 6–1 | (Spain) Fernando Verdasco | (Serbia) Novak Djokovic (Spain) David Ferrer | (Argentina) David Nalbandian (Spain) Albert Montañés (Germany) Philipp Kohlschreiber (Spain) Juan Carlos Ferrero |
| 12 Apr | Monte-Carlo Rolex Masters; Roquebrune-Cap-Martin, France; ATP World Tour Masters 1000; Clay (red) – €2,227,500 – 56S/24D; Singles – Doubles | (Canada) Daniel Nestor (Serbia) Nenad Zimonjić; 6–3, 2–0 retired^{[b]} | (India) Mahesh Bhupathi (Belarus) Max Mirnyi | (Serbia) Novak Djokovic (Spain) David Ferrer | (Argentina) David Nalbandian (Spain) Albert Montañés (Germany) Philipp Kohlschreiber (Spain) Juan Carlos Ferrero |
| 19 Apr | Barcelona Open Banco Sabadell; Barcelona, Spain; ATP World Tour 500; Clay (red) – €1,550,000 – 56S/24D; Singles – Doubles | (Spain) Fernando Verdasco; 6–3, 4–6, 6–3 | (Sweden) Robin Söderling | (Spain) David Ferrer (Netherlands) Thiemo de Bakker | (Brazil) Thomaz Bellucci (Latvia) Ernests Gulbis (France) Jo-Wilfried Tsonga (Argentina) Eduardo Schwank |
| 19 Apr | Barcelona Open Banco Sabadell; Barcelona, Spain; ATP World Tour 500; Clay (red) – €1,550,000 – 56S/24D; Singles – Doubles | (Canada) Daniel Nestor (Serbia) Nenad Zimonjić; 4–6, 6–3, [10–6] | (Australia) Lleyton Hewitt (The Bahamas) Mark Knowles | (Spain) David Ferrer (Netherlands) Thiemo de Bakker | (Brazil) Thomaz Bellucci (Latvia) Ernests Gulbis (France) Jo-Wilfried Tsonga (Argentina) Eduardo Schwank |
| 26 Apr | Internazionali BNL d'Italia; Rome, Italy; ATP World Tour Masters 1000; Clay (red) – €2,227,500 – 56S/24D; Singles – Doubles | (Spain) Rafael Nadal; 7–5, 6–2 | (Spain) David Ferrer | (Latvia) Ernests Gulbis (Spain) Fernando Verdasco | (Spain) Feliciano López (Switzerland) Stanislas Wawrinka (France) Jo-Wilfried Tsonga (Serbia) Novak Djokovic |
| 26 Apr | Internazionali BNL d'Italia; Rome, Italy; ATP World Tour Masters 1000; Clay (red) – €2,227,500 – 56S/24D; Singles – Doubles | (United States) Bob Bryan (United States) Mike Bryan; 6–2, 6–3 | (United States) John Isner (United States) Sam Querrey | (Latvia) Ernests Gulbis (Spain) Fernando Verdasco | (Spain) Feliciano López (Switzerland) Stanislas Wawrinka (France) Jo-Wilfried Tsonga (Serbia) Novak Djokovic |

=== May ===
| Week | Tournament | Champions | Runners-up | Semifinalists | Quarterfinalists |
|---|---|---|---|---|---|
| 3 May | BMW Open; Munich, Germany; ATP World Tour 250; Clay (red) – €398,250 – 32S/16D; Singles – Doubles | (Russia) Mikhail Youzhny; 6–3, 4–6, 6–4 | (Croatia) Marin Čilić | (Cyprus) Marcos Baghdatis (Germany) Philipp Petzschner | (Spain) Nicolás Almagro (Germany) Philipp Kohlschreiber (Czech Republic) Tomáš Berdych (Czech Republic) Jan Hájek |
| 3 May | BMW Open; Munich, Germany; ATP World Tour 250; Clay (red) – €398,250 – 32S/16D; Singles – Doubles | (Austria) Oliver Marach (Spain) Santiago Ventura; 5–7, 6–3, [16–14] | (United States) Eric Butorac (Germany) Michael Kohlmann | (Cyprus) Marcos Baghdatis (Germany) Philipp Petzschner | (Spain) Nicolás Almagro (Germany) Philipp Kohlschreiber (Czech Republic) Tomáš Berdych (Czech Republic) Jan Hájek |
| 3 May | Serbia Open powered by Telekom Srbija; Belgrade, Serbia; ATP World Tour 250; Clay (red) – €373,200 – 28S/16D; Singles – Doubles | (United States) Sam Querrey; 3–6, 7–6^{(7–4)}, 6–4 | (United States) John Isner | (Serbia) Filip Krajinović (Switzerland) Stanislas Wawrinka | (Serbia) Novak Djokovic (Russia) Igor Andreev (Serbia) Viktor Troicki (France) Richard Gasquet |
| 3 May | Serbia Open powered by Telekom Srbija; Belgrade, Serbia; ATP World Tour 250; Clay (red) – €373,200 – 28S/16D; Singles – Doubles | (Mexico) Santiago González (United States) Travis Rettenmaier; 7–6^{(8–6)}, 6–1 | (Poland) Tomasz Bednarek (Poland) Mateusz Kowalczyk | (Serbia) Filip Krajinović (Switzerland) Stanislas Wawrinka | (Serbia) Novak Djokovic (Russia) Igor Andreev (Serbia) Viktor Troicki (France) Richard Gasquet |
| 3 May | Estoril Open; Oeiras, Portugal; ATP World Tour 250; Clay (red) – €398,250 – 28S/16D; Singles – Doubles | (Spain) Albert Montañés; 6–2, 6–7^{(4–7)}, 7–5 | (Portugal) Frederico Gil | (Switzerland) Roger Federer (Spain) Guillermo García López | (France) Arnaud Clément (Uruguay) Pablo Cuevas (Spain) Alberto Martín (Portugal) Rui Machado |
| 3 May | Estoril Open; Oeiras, Portugal; ATP World Tour 250; Clay (red) – €398,250 – 28S/16D; Singles – Doubles | (Spain) Marc López (Spain) David Marrero; 7–6^{(7–1)}, 4–6, [10–4] | (Uruguay) Pablo Cuevas (Spain) Marcel Granollers | (Switzerland) Roger Federer (Spain) Guillermo García López | (France) Arnaud Clément (Uruguay) Pablo Cuevas (Spain) Alberto Martín (Portugal) Rui Machado |
| 10 May | Mutua Madrileña Madrid Open; Madrid, Spain; ATP World Tour Masters 1000; Clay (red) – €2,835,000 – 56S/28Q/24D; Singles – Doubles | (Spain) Rafael Nadal; 6–4, 7–6^{(7–5)} | (Switzerland) Roger Federer | (Spain) David Ferrer (Spain) Nicolás Almagro | (Latvia) Ernests Gulbis (United Kingdom) Andy Murray (Austria) Jürgen Melzer (France) Gaël Monfils |
| 10 May | Mutua Madrileña Madrid Open; Madrid, Spain; ATP World Tour Masters 1000; Clay (red) – €2,835,000 – 56S/28Q/24D; Singles – Doubles | (United States) Bob Bryan (United States) Mike Bryan; 6–3, 6–4 | (Canada) Daniel Nestor (Serbia) Nenad Zimonjić | (Spain) David Ferrer (Spain) Nicolás Almagro | (Latvia) Ernests Gulbis (United Kingdom) Andy Murray (Austria) Jürgen Melzer (France) Gaël Monfils |
| 17 May | ARAG ATP World Team Championship; Düsseldorf, Germany; ATP World Team Championship; Clay (red) – €1,351,000 – 8 teams (RR) | Argentina; 2–1 | United States | Round Robin losers (Blue Group) France; Germany; Serbia | Round Robin losers (Red Group) Czech Republic; Spain; Australia |
| 17 May | Open de Nice Côte d'Azur; Nice, France; ATP World Tour 250; Clay (red) – €398,250 – 28S/16D; Singles – Doubles | (France) Richard Gasquet; 6–3, 5–7, 7–6^{(7–5)} | (Spain) Fernando Verdasco | (Italy) Potito Starace (Argentina) Leonardo Mayer | (Belgium) Olivier Rochus (France) Gaël Monfils (Cyprus) Marcos Baghdatis (Ukraine) Sergiy Stakhovsky |
| 17 May | Open de Nice Côte d'Azur; Nice, France; ATP World Tour 250; Clay (red) – €398,250 – 28S/16D; Singles – Doubles | (Brazil) Marcelo Melo (Brazil) Bruno Soares; 1–6, 6–3, [10–5] | (India) Rohan Bopanna (Pakistan) Aisam-ul-Haq Qureshi | (Italy) Potito Starace (Argentina) Leonardo Mayer | (Belgium) Olivier Rochus (France) Gaël Monfils (Cyprus) Marcos Baghdatis (Ukraine) Sergiy Stakhovsky |
| 24 May; 31 May | French Open; Paris, France; Grand Slam; Clay (red) – €7,580,800; 128S/64D/32X; Singles – Doubles – Mixed doubles | (Spain) Rafael Nadal; 6–4, 6–2, 6–4 | (Sweden) Robin Söderling | (Czech Republic) Tomáš Berdych (Austria) Jürgen Melzer | (Switzerland) Roger Federer (Russia) Mikhail Youzhny (Serbia) Novak Djokovic (Spain) Nicolás Almagro |
| 24 May; 31 May | French Open; Paris, France; Grand Slam; Clay (red) – €7,580,800; 128S/64D/32X; Singles – Doubles – Mixed doubles | (Canada) Daniel Nestor (Serbia) Nenad Zimonjić; 7–5, 6–2 | (Czech Republic) Lukáš Dlouhý (India) Leander Paes | (Czech Republic) Tomáš Berdych (Austria) Jürgen Melzer | (Switzerland) Roger Federer (Russia) Mikhail Youzhny (Serbia) Novak Djokovic (Spain) Nicolás Almagro |
| 24 May; 31 May | French Open; Paris, France; Grand Slam; Clay (red) – €7,580,800; 128S/64D/32X; Singles – Doubles – Mixed doubles | (Serbia) Nenad Zimonjić (Slovenia) Katarina Srebotnik; 4–6, 6–3, [10–8] | (Austria) Julian Knowle (Kazakhstan) Yaroslava Shvedova | (Czech Republic) Tomáš Berdych (Austria) Jürgen Melzer | (Switzerland) Roger Federer (Russia) Mikhail Youzhny (Serbia) Novak Djokovic (Spain) Nicolás Almagro |

=== June ===
| Week | Tournament | Champions | Runners-up | Semifinalists | Quarterfinalists |
|---|---|---|---|---|---|
| 7 Jun | Gerry Weber Open; Halle, Germany; ATP World Tour 250; Grass – €663,750 – 32S/16D; Singles – Doubles | (Australia) Lleyton Hewitt; 3–6, 7–6^{(7–4)}, 6–4 | (Switzerland) Roger Federer | (Germany) Philipp Petzschner (Germany) Benjamin Becker | (Germany) Philipp Kohlschreiber (Slovakia) Lukáš Lacko (Germany) Andreas Beck (Germany) Mischa Zverev |
| 7 Jun | Gerry Weber Open; Halle, Germany; ATP World Tour 250; Grass – €663,750 – 32S/16D; Singles – Doubles | (Ukraine) Sergiy Stakhovsky (Russia) Mikhail Youzhny; 4–6, 7–5, [10–7] | (Czech Republic) Martin Damm (Slovakia) Filip Polášek | (Germany) Philipp Petzschner (Germany) Benjamin Becker | (Germany) Philipp Kohlschreiber (Slovakia) Lukáš Lacko (Germany) Andreas Beck (Germany) Mischa Zverev |
| 7 Jun | Aegon Championships; London, United Kingdom; ATP World Tour 250; Grass – €627,700 – 56S/24D; Singles – Doubles | (United States) Sam Querrey; 7–6^{(7–3)}, 7–5 | (United States) Mardy Fish | (Spain) Feliciano López (Germany) Rainer Schüttler | (Spain) Rafael Nadal (France) Michaël Llodra (Israel) Dudi Sela (Belgium) Xavier Malisse |
| 7 Jun | Aegon Championships; London, United Kingdom; ATP World Tour 250; Grass – €627,700 – 56S/24D; Singles – Doubles | (Serbia) Novak Djokovic (Israel) Jonathan Erlich; 6–7^{(6–8)}, 6–2, [10–3] | (Slovakia) Karol Beck (Czech Republic) David Škoch | (Spain) Feliciano López (Germany) Rainer Schüttler | (Spain) Rafael Nadal (France) Michaël Llodra (Israel) Dudi Sela (Belgium) Xavier Malisse |
| 14 Jun | UNICEF Open 's-Hertogenbosch, Netherlands; ATP World Tour 250; Grass – €398,250 – 32S/16D; Singles – Doubles | (Ukraine) Sergiy Stakhovsky; 6–3, 6–0 | (Serbia) Janko Tipsarević | (Belgium) Xavier Malisse (Germany) Benjamin Becker | (Colombia) Alejandro Falla (Colombia) Santiago Giraldo (Germany) Simon Greul (Australia) Peter Luczak |
| 14 Jun | UNICEF Open 's-Hertogenbosch, Netherlands; ATP World Tour 250; Grass – €398,250 – 32S/16D; Singles – Doubles | (Sweden) Robert Lindstedt (Romania) Horia Tecău; 1–6, 7–5, [10–7] | (Czech Republic) Lukáš Dlouhý (India) Leander Paes | (Belgium) Xavier Malisse (Germany) Benjamin Becker | (Colombia) Alejandro Falla (Colombia) Santiago Giraldo (Germany) Simon Greul (Australia) Peter Luczak |
| 14 Jun | Aegon International; Eastbourne, United Kingdom; ATP World Tour 250; Grass – €405,000 – 32S/16D; Singles – Doubles | (France) Michaël Llodra; 7–5, 6–2 | (Spain) Guillermo García López | (Uzbekistan) Denis Istomin (Ukraine) Alexandr Dolgopolov | (Ukraine) Illya Marchenko (France) Julien Benneteau (France) Gilles Simon (United Kingdom) James Ward |
| 14 Jun | Aegon International; Eastbourne, United Kingdom; ATP World Tour 250; Grass – €405,000 – 32S/16D; Singles – Doubles | (Poland) Mariusz Fyrstenberg (Poland) Marcin Matkowski; 6–3, 5–7, [10–8] | (United Kingdom) Colin Fleming (United Kingdom) Ken Skupski | (Uzbekistan) Denis Istomin (Ukraine) Alexandr Dolgopolov | (Ukraine) Illya Marchenko (France) Julien Benneteau (France) Gilles Simon (United Kingdom) James Ward |
| 21 Jun; 28 Jun | The Championships, Wimbledon; London, United Kingdom; Grand Slam; Grass – £6,196,000; 128S/64D/48X; Singles – Doubles – Mixed doubles | (Spain) Rafael Nadal; 6–3, 7–5, 6–4 | (Czech Republic) Tomáš Berdych | (Serbia) Novak Djokovic (United Kingdom) Andy Murray | (Switzerland) Roger Federer (Chinese Taipei) Lu Yen-hsun (France) Jo-Wilfried Tsonga (Sweden) Robin Söderling |
| 21 Jun; 28 Jun | The Championships, Wimbledon; London, United Kingdom; Grand Slam; Grass – £6,196,000; 128S/64D/48X; Singles – Doubles – Mixed doubles | (Austria) Jürgen Melzer (Germany) Philipp Petzschner; 6–1, 7–5, 7–5 | (Sweden) Robert Lindstedt (Romania) Horia Tecău | (Serbia) Novak Djokovic (United Kingdom) Andy Murray | (Switzerland) Roger Federer (Chinese Taipei) Lu Yen-hsun (France) Jo-Wilfried Tsonga (Sweden) Robin Söderling |
| 21 Jun; 28 Jun | The Championships, Wimbledon; London, United Kingdom; Grand Slam; Grass – £6,196,000; 128S/64D/48X; Singles – Doubles – Mixed doubles | (India) Leander Paes (Zimbabwe) Cara Black; 6–4, 7–6^{(7–5)} | (South Africa) Wesley Moodie (United States) Lisa Raymond | (Serbia) Novak Djokovic (United Kingdom) Andy Murray | (Switzerland) Roger Federer (Chinese Taipei) Lu Yen-hsun (France) Jo-Wilfried Tsonga (Sweden) Robin Söderling |

=== July ===
| Week | Tournament | Champions | Runners-up | Semifinalists | Quarterfinalists |
|---|---|---|---|---|---|
| 5 Jul | Campbell's Hall of Fame Tennis Championships; Newport, United States; ATP World Tour 250; Grass – $442,500 – 32S/16D; Singles – Doubles | (United States) Mardy Fish; 5–7, 6–3, 6–4 | (Belgium) Olivier Rochus | (Argentina) Brian Dabul (United Kingdom) Richard Bloomfield | (Jamaica) Dustin Brown (South Africa) Raven Klaasen (Canada) Frank Dancevic (United States) Ryan Harrison |
| 5 Jul | Campbell's Hall of Fame Tennis Championships; Newport, United States; ATP World Tour 250; Grass – $442,500 – 32S/16D; Singles – Doubles | (Australia) Carsten Ball (Australia) Chris Guccione; 6–3, 6–4 | (Mexico) Santiago González (United States) Travis Rettenmaier | (Argentina) Brian Dabul (United Kingdom) Richard Bloomfield | (Jamaica) Dustin Brown (South Africa) Raven Klaasen (Canada) Frank Dancevic (United States) Ryan Harrison |
| 5 Jul | Davis Cup by BNP Paribas Quarterfinals; Clermont-Ferrand, France – hard (i); Moscow, Russia – hard (i); Split, Croatia – hard (i); Coquimbo, Chile – clay (red) | Quarterfinals winners France 5–0; Argentina 3–2; Serbia 4–1; Czech Republic 4–1 | Quarterfinals losers Spain; Russia; Croatia; Chile | | |
| 12 Jul | MercedesCup; Stuttgart, Germany; ATP World Tour 250; Clay (red) – €398,250 – 28S/16D; Singles – Doubles | (Spain) Albert Montañés; 6–2, 1–2 retired^{[c]} | (France) Gaël Monfils | (Spain) Daniel Gimeno Traver (Spain) Juan Carlos Ferrero | (Switzerland) Marco Chiudinelli (Germany) Florian Mayer (Germany) Simon Greul (Austria) Jürgen Melzer |
| 12 Jul | MercedesCup; Stuttgart, Germany; ATP World Tour 250; Clay (red) – €398,250 – 28S/16D; Singles – Doubles | (Argentina) Carlos Berlocq (Argentina) Eduardo Schwank; 7–6^{(7–5)}, 7–6^{(8–6)} | (Germany) Christopher Kas (Germany) Philipp Petzschner | (Spain) Daniel Gimeno Traver (Spain) Juan Carlos Ferrero | (Switzerland) Marco Chiudinelli (Germany) Florian Mayer (Germany) Simon Greul (Austria) Jürgen Melzer |
| 12 Jul | SkiStar Swedish Open; Båstad, Sweden; ATP World Tour 250; Clay (red) – €398,250 – 28S/16D; Singles – Doubles | (Spain) Nicolás Almagro; 7–5, 3–6, 6–2 | (Sweden) Robin Söderling | (Spain) David Ferrer (Spain) Tommy Robredo | (Italy) Andreas Seppi (Uruguay) Pablo Cuevas (Croatia) Franko Škugor (Spain) Fernando Verdasco |
| 12 Jul | SkiStar Swedish Open; Båstad, Sweden; ATP World Tour 250; Clay (red) – €398,250 – 28S/16D; Singles – Doubles | (Sweden) Robert Lindstedt (Romania) Horia Tecău; 6–4, 7–5 | (Italy) Andreas Seppi (Italy) Simone Vagnozzi | (Spain) David Ferrer (Spain) Tommy Robredo | (Italy) Andreas Seppi (Uruguay) Pablo Cuevas (Croatia) Franko Škugor (Spain) Fernando Verdasco |
| 19 Jul | International German Open; Hamburg, Germany; ATP World Tour 500; Clay (red) – €1,000,000 – 48S/16D; Singles – Doubles | (Kazakhstan) Andrey Golubev; 6–3, 7–5 | (Austria) Jürgen Melzer | (Germany) Florian Mayer (Italy) Andreas Seppi | (Uzbekistan) Denis Istomin (Spain) Juan Carlos Ferrero (Italy) Potito Starace (Brazil) Thomaz Bellucci |
| 19 Jul | International German Open; Hamburg, Germany; ATP World Tour 500; Clay (red) – €1,000,000 – 48S/16D; Singles – Doubles | (Spain) Marc López (Spain) David Marrero; 6–3, 2–6, [10–8] | (France) Jérémy Chardy (France) Paul-Henri Mathieu | (Germany) Florian Mayer (Italy) Andreas Seppi | (Uzbekistan) Denis Istomin (Spain) Juan Carlos Ferrero (Italy) Potito Starace (Brazil) Thomaz Bellucci |
| 19 Jul | Atlanta Tennis Championships; Atlanta, United States; ATP World Tour 250; Hard – $531,000 – 32S/16D; Singles – Doubles | (United States) Mardy Fish; 4–6, 6–4, 7–6^{(7–4)} | (United States) John Isner | (United States) Andy Roddick (South Africa) Kevin Anderson | (Belgium) Xavier Malisse (United States) Taylor Dent (Slovakia) Lukáš Lacko (United States) Michael Russell |
| 19 Jul | Atlanta Tennis Championships; Atlanta, United States; ATP World Tour 250; Hard – $531,000 – 32S/16D; Singles – Doubles | (United States) Scott Lipsky (United States) Rajeev Ram; 6–3, 6–7^{(4–7)}, [12–10] | (India) Rohan Bopanna (Belgium) Kristof Vliegen | (United States) Andy Roddick (South Africa) Kevin Anderson | (Belgium) Xavier Malisse (United States) Taylor Dent (Slovakia) Lukáš Lacko (United States) Michael Russell |
| 26 Jul | Allianz Suisse Open Gstaad; Gstaad, Switzerland; ATP World Tour 250; Clay (red) – €398,250 – 32S/16D; Singles – Doubles | (Spain) Nicolás Almagro; 7–5, 6–1 | (France) Richard Gasquet | (Kazakhstan) Yuri Schukin (Spain) Daniel Gimeno Traver | (Russia) Mikhail Youzhny (Spain) Albert Montañés (Russia) Igor Andreev (France) Jérémy Chardy |
| 26 Jul | Allianz Suisse Open Gstaad; Gstaad, Switzerland; ATP World Tour 250; Clay (red) – €398,250 – 32S/16D; Singles – Doubles | (Sweden) Johan Brunström (Finland) Jarkko Nieminen; 6–3, 6–7^{(4–7)}, [11–9] | (Brazil) Marcelo Melo (Brazil) Bruno Soares | (Kazakhstan) Yuri Schukin (Spain) Daniel Gimeno Traver | (Russia) Mikhail Youzhny (Spain) Albert Montañés (Russia) Igor Andreev (France) Jérémy Chardy |
| 26 Jul | Farmers Classic; Los Angeles, United States; ATP World Tour 250; Hard – $619,500 – 28S/16D; Singles – Doubles | (United States) Sam Querrey; 5–7, 7–6^{(7–2)}, 6–3 | (United Kingdom) Andy Murray | (Spain) Feliciano López (Serbia) Janko Tipsarević | (Colombia) Alejandro Falla (United States) James Blake (Cyprus) Marcos Baghdatis (Germany) Rainer Schüttler |
| 26 Jul | Farmers Classic; Los Angeles, United States; ATP World Tour 250; Hard – $619,500 – 28S/16D; Singles – Doubles | (United States) Bob Bryan (United States) Mike Bryan; 6–7^{(6–8)}, 6–2, [10–7] | (United States) Eric Butorac (Netherlands Antilles) Jean-Julien Rojer | (Spain) Feliciano López (Serbia) Janko Tipsarević | (Colombia) Alejandro Falla (United States) James Blake (Cyprus) Marcos Baghdatis (Germany) Rainer Schüttler |
| 26 Jul | ATP Studena Croatia Open Umag; Umag, Croatia; ATP World Tour 250; Clay (red) – €398,250 – 32S/16D; Singles – Doubles | (Spain) Juan Carlos Ferrero; 6–4, 6–4 | (Italy) Potito Starace | (Argentina) Juan Ignacio Chela (Italy) Andreas Seppi | (Russia) Nikolay Davydenko (Croatia) Ivan Ljubičić (Ukraine) Alexandr Dolgopolov (Austria) Jürgen Melzer |
| 26 Jul | ATP Studena Croatia Open Umag; Umag, Croatia; ATP World Tour 250; Clay (red) – €398,250 – 32S/16D; Singles – Doubles | (Czech Republic) Leoš Friedl (Slovakia) Filip Polášek; 6–3, 7–6^{(9–7)} | (Czech Republic) František Čermák (Slovakia) Michal Mertiňák | (Argentina) Juan Ignacio Chela (Italy) Andreas Seppi | (Russia) Nikolay Davydenko (Croatia) Ivan Ljubičić (Ukraine) Alexandr Dolgopolov (Austria) Jürgen Melzer |

=== August ===
| Week | Tournament | Champions | Runners-up | Semifinalists | Quarterfinalists |
|---|---|---|---|---|---|
| 2 Aug | Legg Mason Tennis Classic; Washington, D.C., United States; ATP World Tour 500; Hard – $1,165,500 – 48S/16D; Singles – Doubles | (Argentina) David Nalbandian; 6–2, 7–6^{(7–4)} | (Cyprus) Marcos Baghdatis | (Belgium) Xavier Malisse (Croatia) Marin Čilić | (Czech Republic) Tomáš Berdych (Spain) Fernando Verdasco (Serbia) Janko Tipsarević (France) Gilles Simon |
| 2 Aug | Legg Mason Tennis Classic; Washington, D.C., United States; ATP World Tour 500; Hard – $1,165,500 – 48S/16D; Singles – Doubles | (United States) Mardy Fish (The Bahamas) Mark Knowles; 4–6, 7–6^{(9–7)}, [10–7] | (Czech Republic) Tomáš Berdych (Czech Republic) Radek Štěpánek | (Belgium) Xavier Malisse (Croatia) Marin Čilić | (Czech Republic) Tomáš Berdych (Spain) Fernando Verdasco (Serbia) Janko Tipsarević (France) Gilles Simon |
| 9 Aug | Rogers Cup; Toronto, Canada; ATP World Tour Masters 1000; Hard – $2,430,000 – 56S/24D; Singles – Doubles | (United Kingdom) Andy Murray; 7–5, 7–5 | (Switzerland) Roger Federer | (Spain) Rafael Nadal (Serbia) Novak Djokovic | (Germany) Philipp Kohlschreiber (Argentina) David Nalbandian (Czech Republic) Tomáš Berdych (France) Jérémy Chardy |
| 9 Aug | Rogers Cup; Toronto, Canada; ATP World Tour Masters 1000; Hard – $2,430,000 – 56S/24D; Singles – Doubles | (United States) Bob Bryan (United States) Mike Bryan; 7–5, 6–3 | (France) Julien Benneteau (France) Michaël Llodra | (Spain) Rafael Nadal (Serbia) Novak Djokovic | (Germany) Philipp Kohlschreiber (Argentina) David Nalbandian (Czech Republic) Tomáš Berdych (France) Jérémy Chardy |
| 16 Aug | Western & Southern Financial Group Masters; Mason, United States; ATP World Tour Masters 1000; Hard – $2,430,000 – 56S/24D; Singles – Doubles | (Switzerland) Roger Federer; 6–7^{(5–7)}, 7–6^{(7–1)}, 6–4 | (United States) Mardy Fish | (Cyprus) Marcos Baghdatis (United States) Andy Roddick | (Spain) Rafael Nadal (Russia) Nikolay Davydenko (United Kingdom) Andy Murray (Serbia) Novak Djokovic |
| 16 Aug | Western & Southern Financial Group Masters; Mason, United States; ATP World Tour Masters 1000; Hard – $2,430,000 – 56S/24D; Singles – Doubles | (United States) Bob Bryan (United States) Mike Bryan; 6–3, 6–4 | (India) Mahesh Bhupathi (Belarus) Max Mirnyi | (Cyprus) Marcos Baghdatis (United States) Andy Roddick | (Spain) Rafael Nadal (Russia) Nikolay Davydenko (United Kingdom) Andy Murray (Serbia) Novak Djokovic |
| 23 Aug | Pilot Pen Tennis; New Haven, United States; ATP World Tour 250; Hard – $663,750 – 48S/16D; Singles – Doubles | (Ukraine) Sergiy Stakhovsky; 3–6, 6–3, 6–4 | (Uzbekistan) Denis Istomin | (Netherlands) Thiemo de Bakker (Serbia) Viktor Troicki | (Cyprus) Marcos Baghdatis (Kazakhstan) Evgeny Korolev (Czech Republic) Radek Štěpánek (Russia) Teymuraz Gabashvili |
| 23 Aug | Pilot Pen Tennis; New Haven, United States; ATP World Tour 250; Hard – $663,750 – 48S/16D; Singles – Doubles | (Sweden) Robert Lindstedt (Romania) Horia Tecău; 6–4, 7–5 | (India) Rohan Bopanna (Pakistan) Aisam-ul-Haq Qureshi | (Netherlands) Thiemo de Bakker (Serbia) Viktor Troicki | (Cyprus) Marcos Baghdatis (Kazakhstan) Evgeny Korolev (Czech Republic) Radek Štěpánek (Russia) Teymuraz Gabashvili |
| 30 Aug; 6 Sep | US Open; New York City, United States; Grand Slam; Hard – $10,508,000; 128S/64D/32X; Singles – Doubles – Mixed doubles | (Spain) Rafael Nadal; 6–4, 5–7, 6–4, 6–2 | (Serbia) Novak Djokovic | (Russia) Mikhail Youzhny (Switzerland) Roger Federer | (Spain) Fernando Verdasco (Switzerland) Stanislas Wawrinka (France) Gaël Monfils (Sweden) Robin Söderling |
| 30 Aug; 6 Sep | US Open; New York City, United States; Grand Slam; Hard – $10,508,000; 128S/64D/32X; Singles – Doubles – Mixed doubles | (United States) Bob Bryan (United States) Mike Bryan; 7–6^{(7–5)}, 7–6^{(7–4)} | (India) Rohan Bopanna (Pakistan) Aisam-ul-Haq Qureshi | (Russia) Mikhail Youzhny (Switzerland) Roger Federer | (Spain) Fernando Verdasco (Switzerland) Stanislas Wawrinka (France) Gaël Monfils (Sweden) Robin Söderling |
| 30 Aug; 6 Sep | US Open; New York City, United States; Grand Slam; Hard – $10,508,000; 128S/64D/32X; Singles – Doubles – Mixed doubles | (United States) Bob Bryan (United States) Liezel Huber; 6–4, 6–4 | (Pakistan) Aisam-ul-Haq Qureshi (Czech Republic) Květa Peschke | (Russia) Mikhail Youzhny (Switzerland) Roger Federer | (Spain) Fernando Verdasco (Switzerland) Stanislas Wawrinka (France) Gaël Monfils (Sweden) Robin Söderling |

=== September ===
| Week | Tournament | Champions | Runners-up | Semifinalists | Quarterfinalists |
|---|---|---|---|---|---|
| 13 Sep | Davis Cup by BNP Paribas Semifinals; Lyon, France – hard (i); Belgrade, Serbia – hard (i) | Semifinals winners France 5–0; Serbia 3–2 | Semifinals losers Argentina; Czech Republic | | |
| 20 Sep | Open de Moselle; Metz, France; ATP World Tour 250; Hard (i) – €398,250 – 28S/16D; Singles – Doubles | (France) Gilles Simon; 6–3, 6–2 | (Germany) Mischa Zverev | (Germany) Philipp Kohlschreiber (France) Richard Gasquet | (Croatia) Marin Čilić (Belgium) Xavier Malisse (Spain) Tommy Robredo (Finland) Jarkko Nieminen |
| 20 Sep | Open de Moselle; Metz, France; ATP World Tour 250; Hard (i) – €398,250 – 28S/16D; Singles – Doubles | (Jamaica) Dustin Brown (Netherlands) Rogier Wassen; 6–3, 6–3 | (Brazil) Marcelo Melo (Brazil) Bruno Soares | (Germany) Philipp Kohlschreiber (France) Richard Gasquet | (Croatia) Marin Čilić (Belgium) Xavier Malisse (Spain) Tommy Robredo (Finland) Jarkko Nieminen |
| 20 Sep | BCR Open Romania; Bucharest, Romania; ATP World Tour 250; Clay (red) – €368,450 – 28S/16D; Singles – Doubles | (Argentina) Juan Ignacio Chela; 7–5, 6–1 | (Spain) Pablo Andújar | (Spain) Albert Montañés (Spain) Marcel Granollers | (France) Jérémy Chardy (Germany) Björn Phau (Italy) Potito Starace (Uruguay) Pablo Cuevas |
| 20 Sep | BCR Open Romania; Bucharest, Romania; ATP World Tour 250; Clay (red) – €368,450 – 28S/16D; Singles – Doubles | (Argentina) Juan Ignacio Chela (Poland) Łukasz Kubot; 6–2, 5–7, [13–11] | (Spain) Marcel Granollers (Spain) Santiago Ventura | (Spain) Albert Montañés (Spain) Marcel Granollers | (France) Jérémy Chardy (Germany) Björn Phau (Italy) Potito Starace (Uruguay) Pablo Cuevas |
| 27 Sep | PTT Thailand Open; Bangkok, Thailand; ATP World Tour 250; Hard (i) – $551,000 – 28S/16D; Singles – Doubles | (Spain) Guillermo García López; 6–4, 3–6, 6–4 | (Finland) Jarkko Nieminen | (Spain) Rafael Nadal (Germany) Benjamin Becker | (Kazakhstan) Mikhail Kukushkin (Latvia) Ernests Gulbis (Austria) Jürgen Melzer (Germany) Daniel Brands |
| 27 Sep | PTT Thailand Open; Bangkok, Thailand; ATP World Tour 250; Hard (i) – $551,000 – 28S/16D; Singles – Doubles | (Germany) Christopher Kas (Serbia) Viktor Troicki; 6–4, 6–4 | (Israel) Jonathan Erlich (Austria) Jürgen Melzer | (Spain) Rafael Nadal (Germany) Benjamin Becker | (Kazakhstan) Mikhail Kukushkin (Latvia) Ernests Gulbis (Austria) Jürgen Melzer (Germany) Daniel Brands |
| 27 Sep | Proton Malaysian Open; Kuala Lumpur, Malaysia; ATP World Tour 250; Hard (i) – $850,000 – 28S/17S/16D; Singles – Doubles | (Russia) Mikhail Youzhny; 6–7^{(7–9)}, 6–2, 7–6^{(7–3)} | (Kazakhstan) Andrey Golubev | (Spain) David Ferrer (Russia) Igor Andreev | (Sweden) Robin Söderling (Czech Republic) Tomáš Berdych (Cyprus) Marcos Baghdatis (Canada) Milos Raonic |
| 27 Sep | Proton Malaysian Open; Kuala Lumpur, Malaysia; ATP World Tour 250; Hard (i) – $850,000 – 28S/17S/16D; Singles – Doubles | (Czech Republic) František Čermák (Slovakia) Michal Mertiňák; 7–6^{(7–3)}, 7–6^{(7–5)} | (Poland) Mariusz Fyrstenberg (Poland) Marcin Matkowski | (Spain) David Ferrer (Russia) Igor Andreev | (Sweden) Robin Söderling (Czech Republic) Tomáš Berdych (Cyprus) Marcos Baghdatis (Canada) Milos Raonic |

=== October ===
| Week | Tournament | Champions | Runners-up | Semifinalists | Quarterfinalists |
|---|---|---|---|---|---|
| 4 Oct | China Open; Beijing, People's Republic of China; ATP World Tour 500; Hard – $2,100,000 – 32S/16D; Singles – Doubles | (Serbia) Novak Djokovic; 6–2, 6–4 | (Spain) David Ferrer | (United States) John Isner (Croatia) Ivan Ljubičić | (France) Gilles Simon (Russia) Nikolay Davydenko (Sweden) Robin Söderling (United Kingdom) Andy Murray |
| 4 Oct | China Open; Beijing, People's Republic of China; ATP World Tour 500; Hard – $2,100,000 – 32S/16D; Singles – Doubles | (United States) Bob Bryan (United States) Mike Bryan; 6–1, 7–6^{(7–5)} | (Poland) Mariusz Fyrstenberg (Poland) Marcin Matkowski | (United States) John Isner (Croatia) Ivan Ljubičić | (France) Gilles Simon (Russia) Nikolay Davydenko (Sweden) Robin Söderling (United Kingdom) Andy Murray |
| 4 Oct | Rakuten Japan Open Tennis Championships; Tokyo, Japan; ATP World Tour 500; Hard – $1,100,000 – 32S/16D; Singles – Doubles | (Spain) Rafael Nadal; 6–1, 7–5 | (France) Gaël Monfils | (Serbia) Viktor Troicki (Czech Republic) Radek Štěpánek | (Russia) Dmitry Tursunov (Spain) Guillermo García López (Finland) Jarkko Nieminen (United States) Andy Roddick |
| 4 Oct | Rakuten Japan Open Tennis Championships; Tokyo, Japan; ATP World Tour 500; Hard – $1,100,000 – 32S/16D; Singles – Doubles | (United States) Eric Butorac (Netherlands Antilles) Jean-Julien Rojer; 6–3, 6–2 | (Italy) Andreas Seppi (Russia) Dmitry Tursunov | (Serbia) Viktor Troicki (Czech Republic) Radek Štěpánek | (Russia) Dmitry Tursunov (Spain) Guillermo García López (Finland) Jarkko Nieminen (United States) Andy Roddick |
| 11 Oct | Shanghai Rolex Masters; Shanghai, People's Republic of China; ATP World Tour Masters 1000; Hard – $3,240,000 – 56S/24D; Singles – Doubles | (United Kingdom) Andy Murray; 6–3, 6–2 | (Switzerland) Roger Federer | (Argentina) Juan Mónaco (Serbia) Novak Djokovic | (Austria) Jürgen Melzer (France) Jo-Wilfried Tsonga (Sweden) Robin Söderling (Spain) Guillermo García López |
| 11 Oct | Shanghai Rolex Masters; Shanghai, People's Republic of China; ATP World Tour Masters 1000; Hard – $3,240,000 – 56S/24D; Singles – Doubles | (Austria) Jürgen Melzer (India) Leander Paes; 7–5, 4–6, [10–5] | (Poland) Mariusz Fyrstenberg (Poland) Marcin Matkowski | (Argentina) Juan Mónaco (Serbia) Novak Djokovic | (Austria) Jürgen Melzer (France) Jo-Wilfried Tsonga (Sweden) Robin Söderling (Spain) Guillermo García López |
| 18 Oct | Kremlin Cup; Moscow, Russia; ATP World Tour 250; Hard (i) – $1,000,000 – 28S/16D; Singles – Doubles | (Serbia) Viktor Troicki; 3–6, 6–4, 6–3 | (Cyprus) Marcos Baghdatis | (Uruguay) Pablo Cuevas (Uzbekistan) Denis Istomin | (Czech Republic) Radek Štěpánek (Argentina) Horacio Zeballos (Ukraine) Alexandr Dolgopolov (Russia) Igor Kunitsyn |
| 18 Oct | Kremlin Cup; Moscow, Russia; ATP World Tour 250; Hard (i) – $1,000,000 – 28S/16D; Singles – Doubles | (Russia) Igor Kunitsyn (Russia) Dmitry Tursunov; 7–6^{(10–8)}, 6–3 | (Serbia) Janko Tipsarević (Serbia) Viktor Troicki | (Uruguay) Pablo Cuevas (Uzbekistan) Denis Istomin | (Czech Republic) Radek Štěpánek (Argentina) Horacio Zeballos (Ukraine) Alexandr Dolgopolov (Russia) Igor Kunitsyn |
| 18 Oct | If Stockholm Open; Stockholm, Sweden; ATP World Tour 250; Hard (i) – €531,000 – 28S/16D; Singles – Doubles | (Switzerland) Roger Federer; 6–4, 6–3 | (Germany) Florian Mayer | (Croatia) Ivan Ljubičić (Finland) Jarkko Nieminen | (Switzerland) Stanislas Wawrinka (Croatia) Ivan Dodig (United States) James Blake (Sweden) Robin Söderling |
| 18 Oct | If Stockholm Open; Stockholm, Sweden; ATP World Tour 250; Hard (i) – €531,000 – 28S/16D; Singles – Doubles | (United States) Eric Butorac (Netherlands Antilles) Jean-Julien Rojer; 6–3, 6–4 | (Sweden) Johan Brunström (Finland) Jarkko Nieminen | (Croatia) Ivan Ljubičić (Finland) Jarkko Nieminen | (Switzerland) Stanislas Wawrinka (Croatia) Ivan Dodig (United States) James Blake (Sweden) Robin Söderling |
| 25 Oct | St. Petersburg Open; Saint Petersburg, Russia; ATP World Tour 250; Hard (i) – $663,750 – 32S/16D; Singles – Doubles | (Kazakhstan) Mikhail Kukushkin; 6–3, 7–6^{(7–2)} | (Russia) Mikhail Youzhny | (Russia) Dmitry Tursunov (Ukraine) Illya Marchenko | (Romania) Victor Hănescu (Ukraine) Alexandr Dolgopolov (Serbia) Janko Tipsarević (Germany) Benjamin Becker |
| 25 Oct | St. Petersburg Open; Saint Petersburg, Russia; ATP World Tour 250; Hard (i) – $663,750 – 32S/16D; Singles – Doubles | (Italy) Daniele Bracciali (Italy) Potito Starace; 7–6^{(8–6)}, 7–6^{(7–5)} | (India) Rohan Bopanna (Pakistan) Aisam-ul-Haq Qureshi | (Russia) Dmitry Tursunov (Ukraine) Illya Marchenko | (Romania) Victor Hănescu (Ukraine) Alexandr Dolgopolov (Serbia) Janko Tipsarević (Germany) Benjamin Becker |
| 25 Oct | Bank Austria-TennisTrophy; Vienna, Austria; ATP World Tour 250; Hard (i) – €575,250 – 28S/16D; Singles – Doubles | (Austria) Jürgen Melzer; 6–7^{(10–12)}, 7–6^{(7–4)}, 6–4 | (Austria) Andreas Haider-Maurer | (Spain) Nicolás Almagro (Germany) Michael Berrer | (Germany) Philipp Kohlschreiber (Argentina) Juan Ignacio Chela (Cyprus) Marcos Baghdatis (Croatia) Marin Čilić |
| 25 Oct | Bank Austria-TennisTrophy; Vienna, Austria; ATP World Tour 250; Hard (i) – €575,250 – 28S/16D; Singles – Doubles | (Canada) Daniel Nestor (Serbia) Nenad Zimonjić; 7–5, 3–6, [10–5] | (Poland) Mariusz Fyrstenberg (Poland) Marcin Matkowski | (Spain) Nicolás Almagro (Germany) Michael Berrer | (Germany) Philipp Kohlschreiber (Argentina) Juan Ignacio Chela (Cyprus) Marcos Baghdatis (Croatia) Marin Čilić |
| 25 Oct | Open Sud de France; Montpellier, France; ATP World Tour 250; Hard (i) – €575,250 – 28S/16D; Singles – Doubles | (France) Gaël Monfils; 6–2, 5–7, 6–1 | (Croatia) Ivan Ljubičić | (Spain) Albert Montañés (France) Jo-Wilfried Tsonga | (Russia) Nikolay Davydenko (Finland) Jarkko Nieminen (United States) John Isner (France) Gilles Simon |
| 25 Oct | Open Sud de France; Montpellier, France; ATP World Tour 250; Hard (i) – €575,250 – 28S/16D; Singles – Doubles | (Australia) Stephen Huss (United Kingdom) Ross Hutchins; 6–2, 4–6, [10–7] | (Spain) Marc López (Argentina) Eduardo Schwank | (Spain) Albert Montañés (France) Jo-Wilfried Tsonga | (Russia) Nikolay Davydenko (Finland) Jarkko Nieminen (United States) John Isner (France) Gilles Simon |

=== November ===
| Week | Tournament | Champions | Runners-up | Semifinalists | Quarterfinalists |
|---|---|---|---|---|---|
| 1 Nov | Valencia Open 500; Valencia, Spain; ATP World Tour 500; Hard (i) – €1,357,000 – 32S/16D; Singles – Doubles | (Spain) David Ferrer; 7–5, 6–3 | (Spain) Marcel Granollers | (France) Gilles Simon (Sweden) Robin Söderling | (Argentina) Juan Mónaco (Russia) Nikolay Davydenko (Italy) Potito Starace (France) Gaël Monfils |
| 1 Nov | Valencia Open 500; Valencia, Spain; ATP World Tour 500; Hard (i) – €1,357,000 – 32S/16D; Singles – Doubles | (United Kingdom) Andy Murray (United Kingdom) Jamie Murray; 7–6^{(10–8)}, 5–7, [10–7] | (India) Mahesh Bhupathi (Belarus) Max Mirnyi | (France) Gilles Simon (Sweden) Robin Söderling | (Argentina) Juan Mónaco (Russia) Nikolay Davydenko (Italy) Potito Starace (France) Gaël Monfils |
| 1 Nov | Davidoff Swiss Indoors; Basel, Switzerland; ATP World Tour 500; Hard (i) – €1,225,000 – 32S/16D; Singles – Doubles | (Switzerland) Roger Federer; 6–4, 3–6, 6–1 | (Serbia) Novak Djokovic | (United States) Andy Roddick (Serbia) Viktor Troicki | (Czech Republic) Radek Štěpánek (Argentina) David Nalbandian (France) Richard Gasquet (Netherlands) Robin Haase |
| 1 Nov | Davidoff Swiss Indoors; Basel, Switzerland; ATP World Tour 500; Hard (i) – €1,225,000 – 32S/16D; Singles – Doubles | (United States) Bob Bryan (United States) Mike Bryan; 6–3, 3–6, [10–3] | (Canada) Daniel Nestor (Serbia) Nenad Zimonjić | (United States) Andy Roddick (Serbia) Viktor Troicki | (Czech Republic) Radek Štěpánek (Argentina) David Nalbandian (France) Richard Gasquet (Netherlands) Robin Haase |
| 8 Nov | BNP Paribas Masters; Paris, France; ATP World Tour Masters 1000; Hard (i) – €2,227,500 – 48S/24D; Singles – Doubles | (Sweden) Robin Söderling; 6–1, 7–6^{(7–1)} | (France) Gaël Monfils | (Switzerland) Roger Federer (France) Michaël Llodra | (Austria) Jürgen Melzer (United Kingdom) Andy Murray (United States) Andy Roddick (Russia) Nikolay Davydenko |
| 8 Nov | BNP Paribas Masters; Paris, France; ATP World Tour Masters 1000; Hard (i) – €2,227,500 – 48S/24D; Singles – Doubles | (India) Mahesh Bhupathi (Belarus) Max Mirnyi; 7–5, 7–5 | (The Bahamas) Mark Knowles (Israel) Andy Ram | (Switzerland) Roger Federer (France) Michaël Llodra | (Austria) Jürgen Melzer (United Kingdom) Andy Murray (United States) Andy Roddick (Russia) Nikolay Davydenko |
| 22 Nov | Barclays ATP World Tour Finals; London, United Kingdom; ATP World Tour Finals; Hard (i) – £2,227,500 – 8S/8D (RR); Singles – Doubles | (Switzerland) Roger Federer; 6–3, 3–6, 6–1 | (Spain) Rafael Nadal | (United Kingdom) Andy Murray (Serbia) Novak Djokovic | Round Robin losers (Czech Republic) Tomáš Berdych (United States) Andy Roddick (Sweden) Robin Söderling (Spain) David Ferrer |
| 22 Nov | Barclays ATP World Tour Finals; London, United Kingdom; ATP World Tour Finals; Hard (i) – £2,227,500 – 8S/8D (RR); Singles – Doubles | (Canada) Daniel Nestor (Serbia) Nenad Zimonjić; 7–6^{(8–6)}, 6–4 | (India) Mahesh Bhupathi (Belarus) Max Mirnyi | (United Kingdom) Andy Murray (Serbia) Novak Djokovic | Round Robin losers (Czech Republic) Tomáš Berdych (United States) Andy Roddick (Sweden) Robin Söderling (Spain) David Ferrer |
| 29 Nov | Davis Cup by BNP Paribas Final; Belgrade, Serbia – hard (i) | Serbia; 3–2 | France | | |

== Statistical information ==
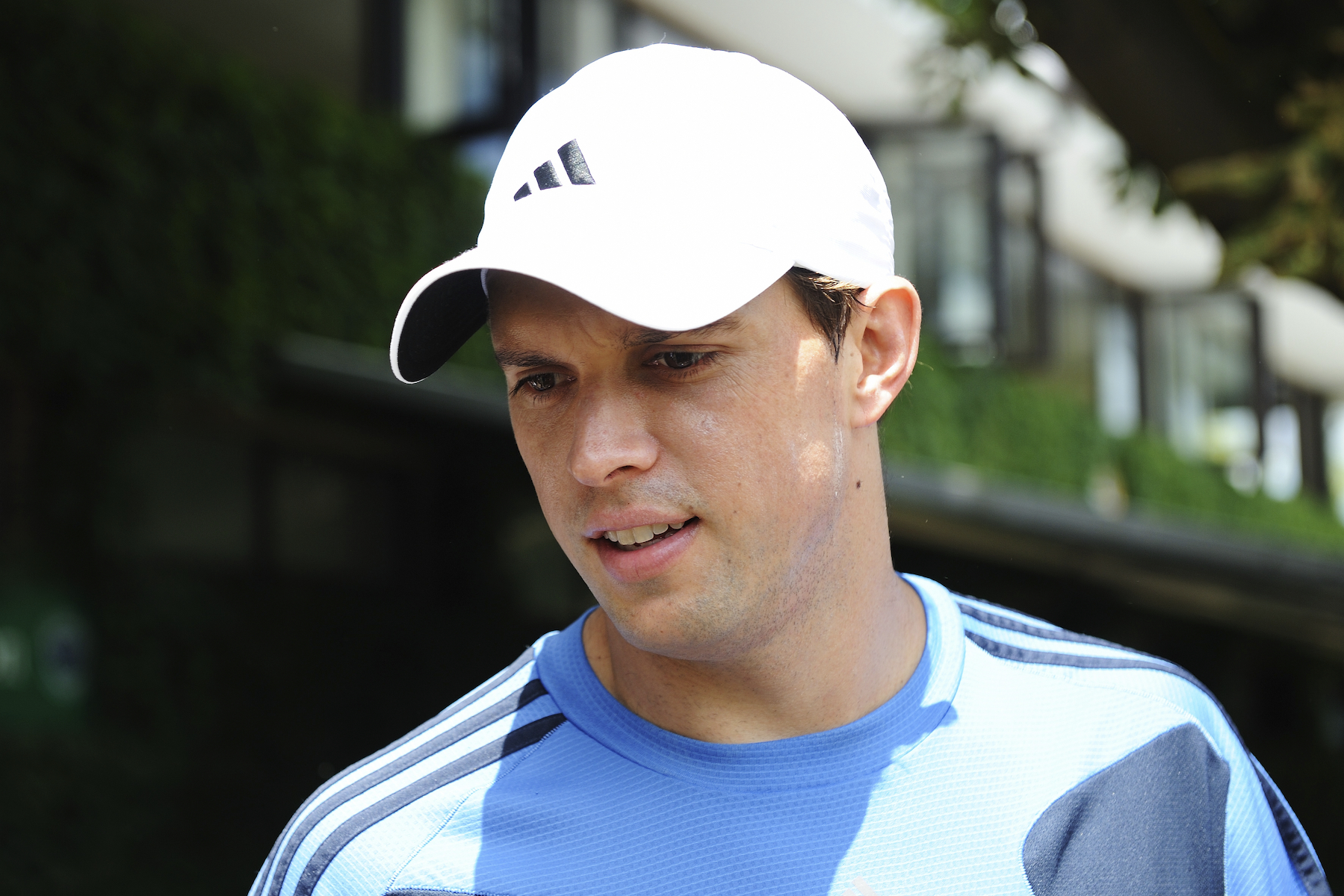
With eleven titles collected alongside his twin brother Mike plus a mixed doubles title won at the US Open with Liezel Huber, doubles world No. 1 Bob Bryan is the title leader in the 2010 ATP World Tour season.

These tables present the number of singles (S), doubles (D), and mixed doubles (X) titles won by each player and each nation during the season, within all the tournament categories of the 2010 ATP World Tour: the Grand Slam tournaments, the ATP World Tour Finals, the ATP World Tour Masters 1000, the ATP World Tour 500 series, and the ATP World Tour 250 series. The players/nations are sorted by: 1) total number of titles (a doubles title won by two players representing the same nation counts as only one win for the nation); 2) cumulated importance of those titles (one Grand Slam win equalling two Masters 1000 wins, one ATP World Tour Finals win equalling one-and-a-half Masters 1000 win, one Masters 1000 win equalling two 500 events wins, one 500 event win equalling two 250 events wins); 3) a singles > doubles > mixed doubles hierarchy; 4) alphabetical order (by family names for players).

=== Key ===
Grand Slam
ATP World Tour Finals
ATP World Tour Masters 1000
ATP World Tour 500
ATP World Tour 250
All titles

=== Titles won by player ===
| Total | Player | Grand Slam | | | ATP Finals | | Masters 1000 | | Tour 500 | | Tour 250 | | Total | | |
| Total | Player | S | D | X | S | D | S | D | S | D | S | D | S | D | X |
|---|---|---|---|---|---|---|---|---|---|---|---|---|---|---|---|
| 12 | Bob Bryan (USA) | | ● ● | ● | | | | ● ● ● ● | | ● ● | | ● ● ● | 0 | 11 | 1 |
| 11 | Mike Bryan (USA) | | ● ● | | | | | ● ● ● ● | | ● ● | | ● ● ● | 0 | 11 | 0 |
| 8 | Rafael Nadal (ESP) | ● ● ● | | | | | ● ● ● | ● | ● | | | | 7 | 1 | 0 |
| 8 | Nenad Zimonjić (SRB) | | ● | ● | | ● | | ● | | ● ● | | ● ● | 0 | 7 | 1 |
| 7 | Daniel Nestor (CAN) | | ● | | | ● | | ● | | ● ● | | ● ● | 0 | 7 | 0 |
| 6 | Sam Querrey (USA) | | | | | | | | ● | ● | ● ● ● | ● | 4 | 2 | 0 |
| 5 | Roger Federer (SUI) | ● | | | ● | | ● | | ● | | ● | | 5 | 0 | 0 |
| 5 | Horia Tecău (ROU) | | | | | | | | | | | ● ● ● ● ● | 0 | 5 | 0 |
| 4 | Leander Paes (IND) | | | ●● | | | | ● ● | | | | | 0 | 2 | 2 |
| 4 | Jürgen Melzer (AUT) | | ● | | | | | ● | | | ● | ● | 1 | 3 | 0 |
| 4 | Mardy Fish (USA) | | | | | | | | | ● | ● ● | ● | 2 | 2 | 0 |
| 4 | Robert Lindstedt (SWE) | | | | | | | | | | | ● ● ● ● | 0 | 4 | 0 |
| 3 | Andy Murray (GBR) | | | | | | ● ● | | | ● | | | 2 | 1 | 0 |
| 3 | Marc López (ESP) | | | | | | | ● | | ● | | ● | 0 | 3 | 0 |
| 3 | Novak Djokovic (SRB) | | | | | | | | ● ● | | | ● | 2 | 1 | 0 |
| 3 | Łukasz Kubot (POL) | | | | | | | | | ● | | ● ● | 0 | 3 | 0 |
| 3 | Oliver Marach (AUT) | | | | | | | | | ● | | ● ● | 0 | 3 | 0 |
| 3 | Juan Carlos Ferrero (ESP) | | | | | | | | | | ● ● ● | | 3 | 0 | 0 |
| 3 | Juan Ignacio Chela (ARG) | | | | | | | | | | ● ● | ● | 2 | 1 | 0 |
| 3 | Michaël Llodra (FRA) | | | | | | | | | | ● ● | ● | 2 | 1 | 0 |
| 3 | Albert Montañés (ESP) | | | | | | | | | | ● ● | ● | 2 | 1 | 0 |
| 3 | Sergiy Stakhovsky (UKR) | | | | | | | | | | ● ● | ● | 2 | 1 | 0 |
| 3 | Mikhail Youzhny (RUS) | | | | | | | | | | ● ● | ● | 2 | 1 | 0 |
| 2 | Philipp Petzschner (GER) | | ● | | | | | | | | | ● | 0 | 2 | 0 |
| 2 | Robin Söderling (SWE) | | | | | | ● | | ● | | | | 2 | 0 | 0 |
| 2 | Andy Roddick (USA) | | | | | | ● | | | | ● | | 2 | 0 | 0 |
| 2 | David Ferrer (ESP) | | | | | | | | ● ● | | | | 2 | 0 | 0 |
| 2 | Fernando Verdasco (ESP) | | | | | | | | ● | | ● | | 2 | 0 | 0 |
| 2 | John Isner (USA) | | | | | | | | | ● | ● | | 1 | 1 | 0 |
| 2 | Eric Butorac (USA) | | | | | | | | | ● | | ● | 0 | 2 | 0 |
| 2 | David Marrero (ESP) | | | | | | | | | ● | | ● | 0 | 2 | 0 |
| 2 | Jean-Julien Rojer (AHO) | | | | | | | | | ● | | ● | 0 | 2 | 0 |
| 2 | Nicolás Almagro (ESP) | | | | | | | | | | ● ● | | 2 | 0 | 0 |
| 2 | Marin Čilić (CRO) | | | | | | | | | | ● ● | | 2 | 0 | 0 |
| 2 | Guillermo García López (ESP) | | | | | | | | | | ● | ● | 1 | 1 | 0 |
| 2 | Viktor Troicki (SRB) | | | | | | | | | | ● | ● | 1 | 1 | 0 |
| 2 | Marcel Granollers (ESP) | | | | | | | | | | | ● ● | 0 | 2 | 0 |
| 2 | Santiago Ventura (ESP) | | | | | | | | | | | ● ● | 0 | 2 | 0 |
| 1 | Ivan Ljubičić (CRO) | | | | | | ● | | | | | | 1 | 0 | 0 |
| 1 | Mahesh Bhupathi (IND) | | | | | | | ● | | | | | 0 | 1 | 0 |
| 1 | Lukáš Dlouhý (CZE) | | | | | | | ● | | | | | 0 | 1 | 0 |
| 1 | Max Mirnyi (BLR) | | | | | | | ● | | | | | 0 | 1 | 0 |
| 1 | Andrey Golubev (KAZ) | | | | | | | | ● | | | | 1 | 0 | 0 |
| 1 | David Nalbandian (ARG) | | | | | | | | ● | | | | 1 | 0 | 0 |
| 1 | Simon Aspelin (SWE) | | | | | | | | | ● | | | 0 | 1 | 0 |
| 1 | Paul Hanley (AUS) | | | | | | | | | ● | | | 0 | 1 | 0 |
| 1 | Mark Knowles (BAH) | | | | | | | | | ● | | | 0 | 1 | 0 |
| 1 | Jamie Murray (GBR) | | | | | | | | | ● | | | 0 | 1 | 0 |
| 1 | Marcos Baghdatis (CYP) | | | | | | | | | | ● | | 1 | 0 | 0 |
| 1 | Thomaz Bellucci (BRA) | | | | | | | | | | ● | | 1 | 0 | 0 |
| 1 | Nikolay Davydenko (RUS) | | | | | | | | | | ● | | 1 | 0 | 0 |
| 1 | Richard Gasquet (FRA) | | | | | | | | | | ● | | 1 | 0 | 0 |
| 1 | Ernests Gulbis (LAT) | | | | | | | | | | ● | | 1 | 0 | 0 |
| 1 | Lleyton Hewitt (AUS) | | | | | | | | | | ● | | 1 | 0 | 0 |
| 1 | Mikhail Kukushkin (KAZ) | | | | | | | | | | ● | | 1 | 0 | 0 |
| 1 | Feliciano López (ESP) | | | | | | | | | | ● | | 1 | 0 | 0 |
| 1 | Gaël Monfils (FRA) | | | | | | | | | | ● | | 1 | 0 | 0 |
| 1 | Gilles Simon (FRA) | | | | | | | | | | ● | | 1 | 0 | 0 |
| 1 | Stanislas Wawrinka (SUI) | | | | | | | | | | ● | | 1 | 0 | 0 |
| 1 | Carsten Ball (AUS) | | | | | | | | | | | ● | 0 | 1 | 0 |
| 1 | Julien Benneteau (FRA) | | | | | | | | | | | ● | 0 | 1 | 0 |
| 1 | Carlos Berlocq (ARG) | | | | | | | | | | | ● | 0 | 1 | 0 |
| 1 | Rohan Bopanna (IND) | | | | | | | | | | | ● | 0 | 1 | 0 |
| 1 | Daniele Bracciali (ITA) | | | | | | | | | | | ● | 0 | 1 | 0 |
| 1 | Dustin Brown (GER)^{[d]} | | | | | | | | | | | ● | 0 | 1 | 0 |
| 1 | Johan Brunström (SWE) | | | | | | | | | | | ● | 0 | 1 | 0 |
| 1 | František Čermák (CZE) | | | | | | | | | | | ● | 0 | 1 | 0 |
| 1 | Jérémy Chardy (FRA) | | | | | | | | | | | ● | 0 | 1 | 0 |
| 1 | Pablo Cuevas (URU) | | | | | | | | | | | ● | 0 | 1 | 0 |
| 1 | Marcus Daniell (NZL) | | | | | | | | | | | ● | 0 | 1 | 0 |
| 1 | Jonathan Erlich (ISR) | | | | | | | | | | | ● | 0 | 1 | 0 |
| 1 | Leoš Friedl (CZE) | | | | | | | | | | | ● | 0 | 1 | 0 |
| 1 | Mariusz Fyrstenberg (POL) | | | | | | | | | | | ● | 0 | 1 | 0 |
| 1 | Marc Gicquel (FRA) | | | | | | | | | | | ● | 0 | 1 | 0 |
| 1 | Santiago González (MEX) | | | | | | | | | | | ● | 0 | 1 | 0 |
| 1 | Chris Guccione (AUS) | | | | | | | | | | | ● | 0 | 1 | 0 |
| 1 | Stephen Huss (AUS) | | | | | | | | | | | ● | 0 | 1 | 0 |
| 1 | Ross Hutchins (GBR) | | | | | | | | | | | ● | 0 | 1 | 0 |
| 1 | Christopher Kas (GER) | | | | | | | | | | | ● | 0 | 1 | 0 |
| 1 | Igor Kunitsyn (RUS) | | | | | | | | | | | ● | 0 | 1 | 0 |
| 1 | Scott Lipsky (USA) | | | | | | | | | | | ● | 0 | 1 | 0 |
| 1 | Marcin Matkowski (POL) | | | | | | | | | | | ● | 0 | 1 | 0 |
| 1 | Marcelo Melo (BRA) | | | | | | | | | | | ● | 0 | 1 | 0 |
| 1 | Michal Mertiňák (SVK) | | | | | | | | | | | ● | 0 | 1 | 0 |
| 1 | Jarkko Nieminen (FIN) | | | | | | | | | | | ● | 0 | 1 | 0 |
| 1 | Filip Polášek (SVK) | | | | | | | | | | | ● | 0 | 1 | 0 |
| 1 | Sebastián Prieto (ARG) | | | | | | | | | | | ● | 0 | 1 | 0 |
| 1 | Aisam-ul-Haq Qureshi (PAK) | | | | | | | | | | | ● | 0 | 1 | 0 |
| 1 | Rajeev Ram (USA) | | | | | | | | | | | ● | 0 | 1 | 0 |
| 1 | Travis Rettenmaier (USA) | | | | | | | | | | | ● | 0 | 1 | 0 |
| 1 | Eduardo Schwank (ARG) | | | | | | | | | | | ● | 0 | 1 | 0 |
| 1 | Bruno Soares (BRA) | | | | | | | | | | | ● | 0 | 1 | 0 |
| 1 | Potito Starace (ITA) | | | | | | | | | | | ● | 0 | 1 | 0 |
| 1 | Dmitry Tursunov (RUS) | | | | | | | | | | | ● | 0 | 1 | 0 |
| 1 | Rogier Wassen (NED) | | | | | | | | | | | ● | 0 | 1 | 0 |
| 1 | Horacio Zeballos (ARG) | | | | | | | | | | | ● | 0 | 1 | 0 |

=== Titles won by nation ===
| Total | Nation | Grand Slam | | | ATP Finals | | Masters 1000 | | Tour 500 | | Tour 250 | | Total | | |
| Total | Nation | S | D | X | S | D | S | D | S | D | S | D | S | D | X |
|---|---|---|---|---|---|---|---|---|---|---|---|---|---|---|---|
| 27 | Spain (ESP) | 3 | | | | | 3 | 1 | 4 | 1 | 10 | 5 | 20 | 7 | 0 |
| 27 | United States (USA) | | 2 | 1 | | | 1 | 4 | 1 | 4 | 6 | 8 | 9 | 17 | 1 |
| 13 | Serbia (SRB) | | 1 | 1 | | 1 | | 1 | 2 | 2 | 1 | 4 | 3 | 9 | 1 |
| 8 | Sweden (SWE) | | | | | | 1 | | 1 | 1 | | 5 | 2 | 6 | 0 |
| 7 | Canada (CAN) | | 1 | | | 1 | | 1 | | 2 | | 2 | 0 | 7 | 0 |
| 7 | Austria (AUT) | | 1 | | | | | 1 | | 1 | 1 | 3 | 1 | 6 | 0 |
| 7 | France (FRA) | | | | | | | | | | 4 | 2 | 5 | 2 | 0 |
| 6 | India (IND) | | | 2 | | | | 3 | | | | 1 | 0 | 4 | 2 |
| 6 | Switzerland (SUI) | 1 | | | 1 | | 1 | | 1 | | 2 | | 6 | 0 | 0 |
| 6 | Argentina (ARG) | | | | | | | | 1 | | 2 | 3 | 3 | 3 | 0 |
| 5 | Russia (RUS) | | | | | | | | | | 3 | 2 | 3 | 2 | 0 |
| 5 | Romania (ROU) | | | | | | | | | | | 5 | 0 | 5 | 0 |
| 4 | Great Britain (GBR) | | | | | | 2 | | | 1 | | 1 | 2 | 2 | 0 |
| 3 | Germany (GER) | | 1 | | | | | | | | | 2 | 0 | 3 | 0 |
| 3 | Croatia (CRO) | | | | | | 1 | | | | 2 | | 3 | 0 | 0 |
| 3 | Czech Republic (CZE) | | | | | | | 1 | | | | 2 | 0 | 3 | 0 |
| 3 | Australia (AUS) | | | | | | | | | 1 | 1 | 1 | 1 | 2 | 0 |
| 3 | Poland (POL) | | | | | | | | | 1 | | 2 | 0 | 3 | 0 |
| 3 | Ukraine (UKR) | | | | | | | | | | 2 | 1 | 2 | 1 | 0 |
| 2 | Kazakhstan (KAZ) | | | | | | | | 1 | | 1 | | 2 | 0 | 0 |
| 2 | Netherlands Antilles (AHO) | | | | | | | | | 1 | | 1 | 0 | 2 | 0 |
| 2 | Brazil (BRA) | | | | | | | | | | 1 | 1 | 1 | 1 | 0 |
| 2 | Slovakia (SVK) | | | | | | | | | | | 2 | 0 | 2 | 0 |
| 1 | Belarus (BLR) | | | | | | | 1 | | | | | 0 | 1 | 0 |
| 1 | Bahamas (BAH) | | | | | | | | | 1 | | | 0 | 1 | 0 |
| 1 | Cyprus (CYP) | | | | | | | | | | 1 | | 1 | 0 | 0 |
| 1 | Latvia (LAT) | | | | | | | | | | 1 | | 1 | 0 | 0 |
| 1 | Finland (FIN) | | | | | | | | | | | 1 | 0 | 1 | 0 |
| 1 | Israel (ISR) | | | | | | | | | | | 1 | 0 | 1 | 0 |
| 1 | Italy (ITA) | | | | | | | | | | | 1 | 0 | 1 | 0 |
| 1 | Jamaica (JAM) | | | | | | | | | | | 1 | 0 | 1 | 0 |
| 1 | Mexico (MEX) | | | | | | | | | | | 1 | 0 | 1 | 0 |
| 1 | Netherlands (NED) | | | | | | | | | | | 1 | 0 | 1 | 0 |
| 1 | New Zealand (NZL) | | | | | | | | | | | 1 | 0 | 1 | 0 |
| 1 | Pakistan (PAK) | | | | | | | | | | | 1 | 0 | 1 | 0 |
| 1 | Uruguay (URU) | | | | | | | | | | | 1 | 0 | 1 | 0 |

=== Titles information ===
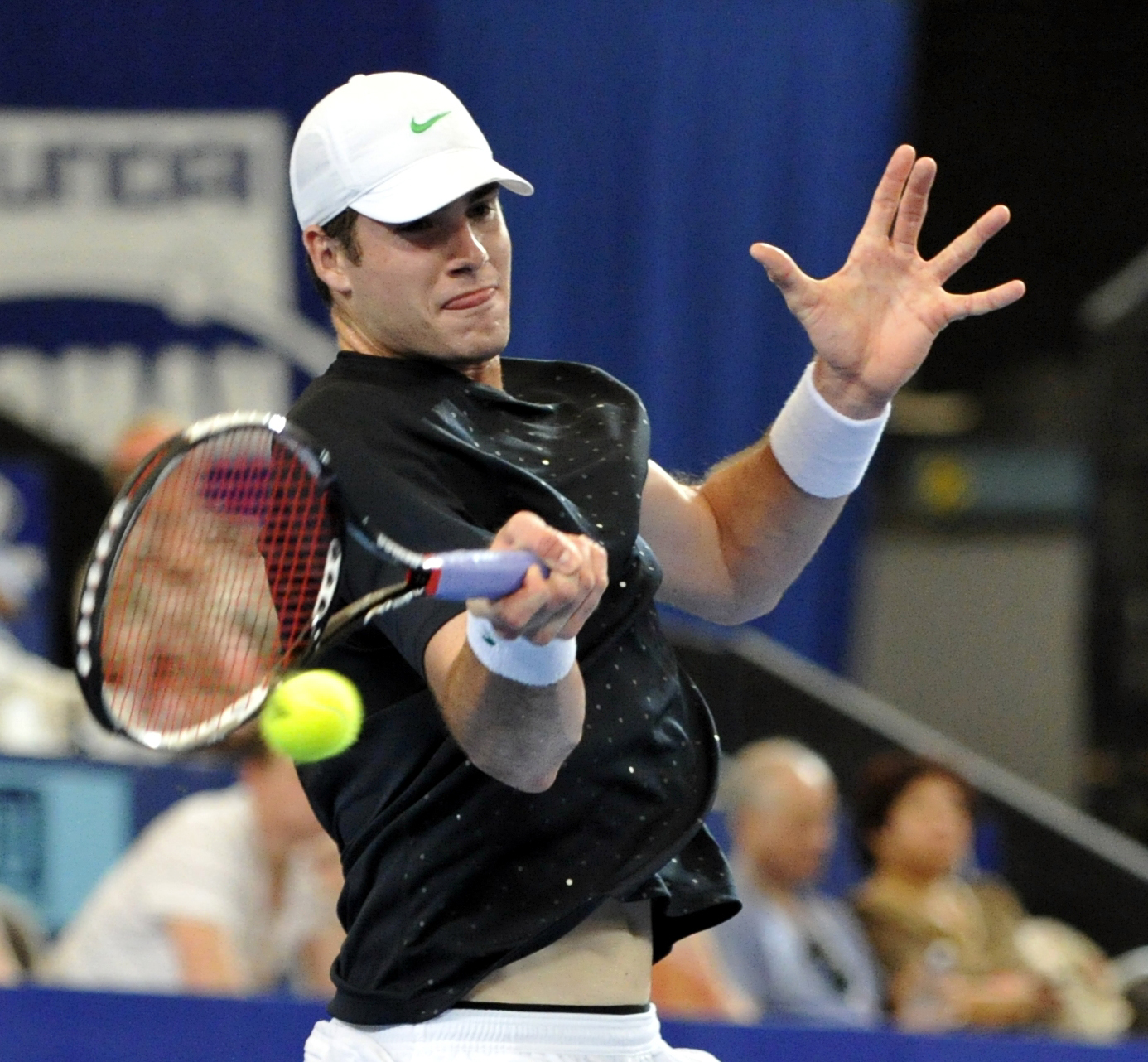
John Isner collected his first singles title on the ATP World Tour overcoming Arnaud Clément in the Auckland final.

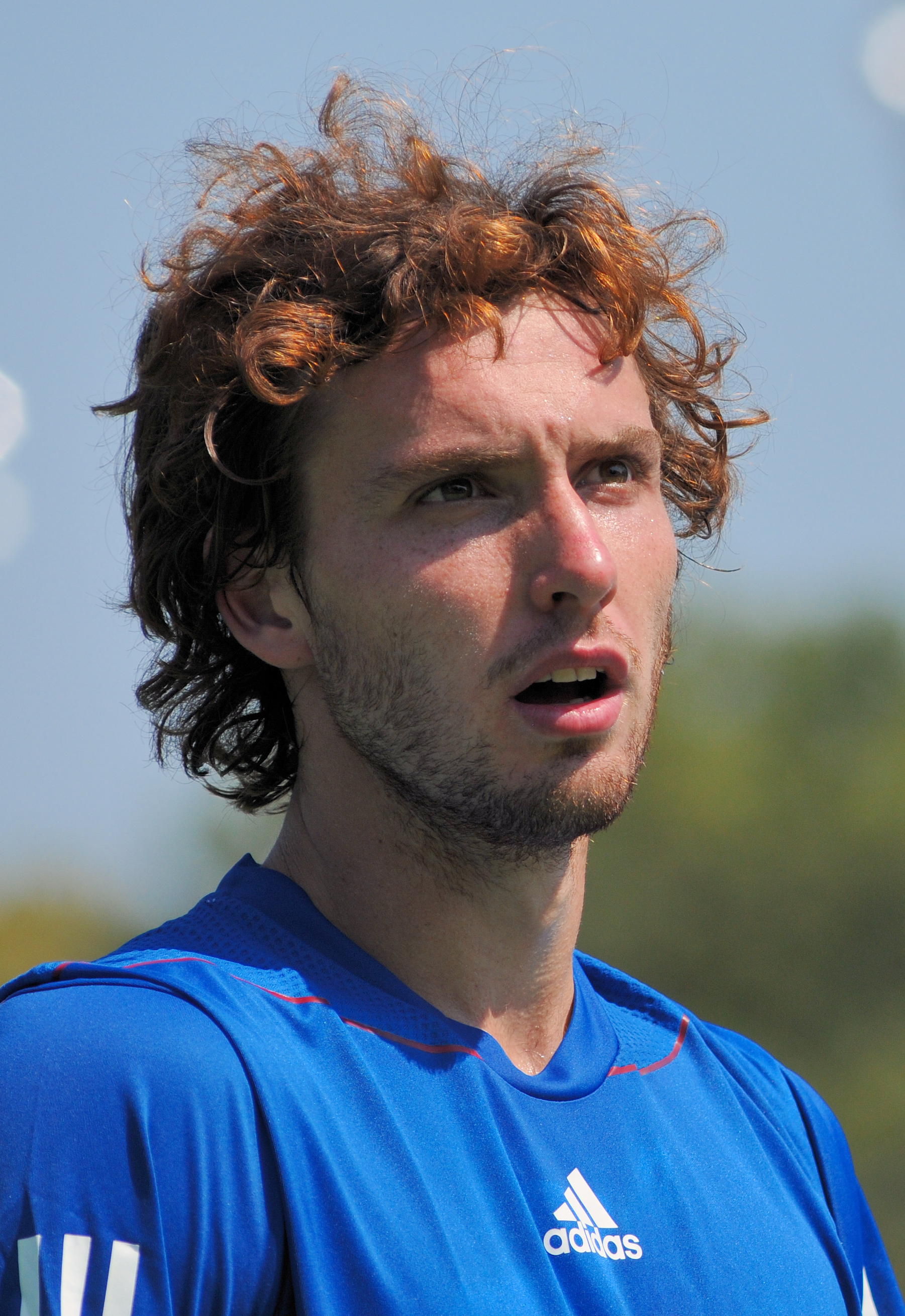
21-year-old Ernests Gulbis won his maiden ATP World Tour singles title in Delray Beach defeating Ivo Karlović in the final.

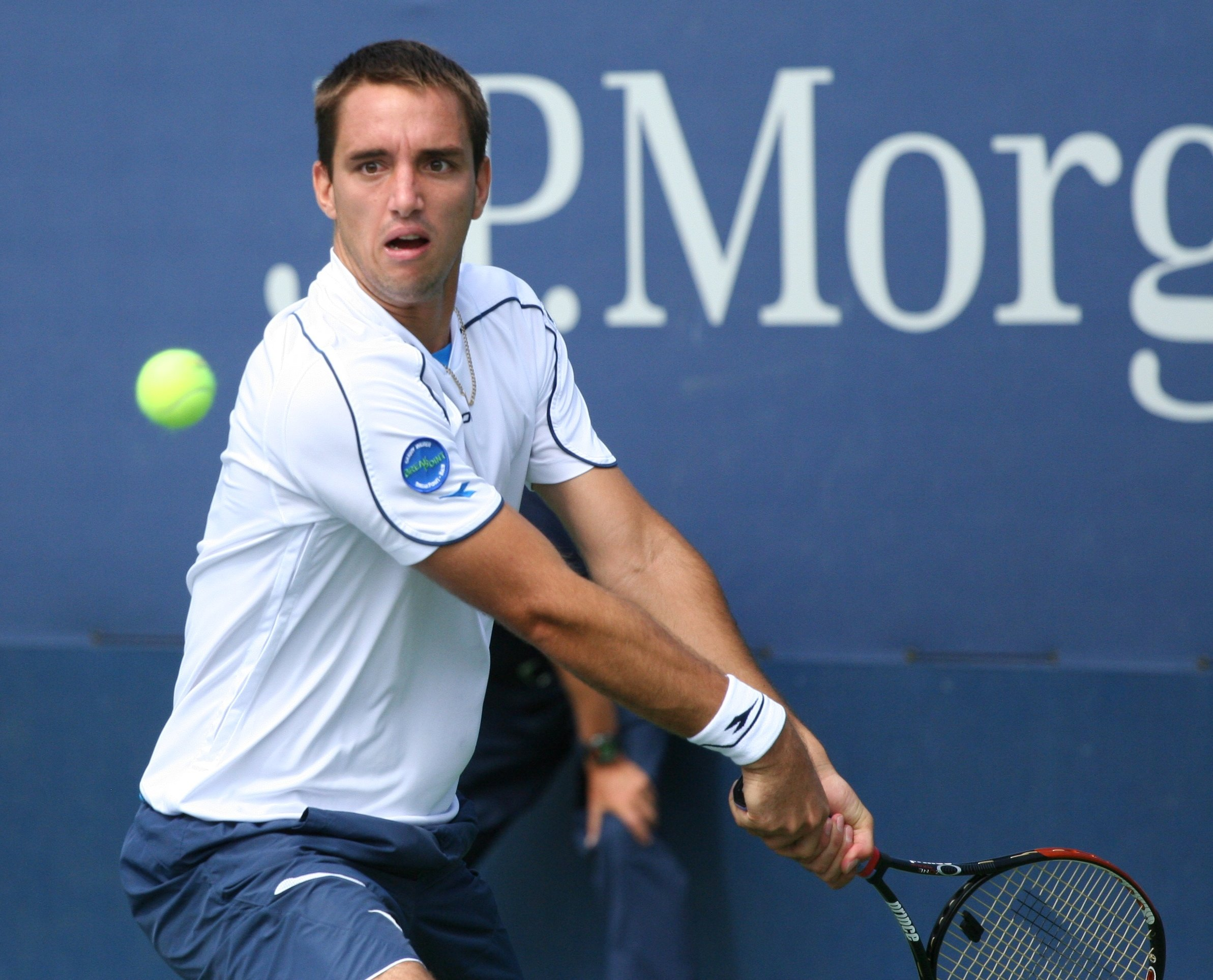
Serbia's Viktor Troicki captured his first doubles and singles titles on the ATP World Tour respectively in Bangkok and Moscow.

The following players won their first main circuit title in singles, doubles, or mixed doubles:

Singles

- (United States) John Isner – Auckland (singles)
- (Latvia) Ernests Gulbis – Delray Beach (singles)
- (Kazakhstan) Andrey Golubev – Hamburg (singles)
- (Serbia) Viktor Troicki – Moscow (singles)
- (Kazakhstan) Mikhail Kukushkin – St. Petersburg (singles)

Doubles

- (France) Jérémy Chardy – Brisbane (doubles)
- (Spain) Guillermo García López – Doha (doubles)
- (New Zealand) Marcus Daniell – Auckland (doubles)
- (Romania) Horia Tecău – Auckland (doubles)
- (Pakistan) Aisam-ul-Haq Qureshi – Johannesburg (doubles)
- (Germany) Philipp Petzschner – Zagreb (doubles)
- (United States) Sam Querrey – San Jose (doubles)
- (Argentina) Horacio Zeballos – Buenos Aires (doubles)
- (Mexico) Santiago González – Belgrade (doubles)
- (United States) Travis Rettenmaier – Belgrade (doubles)
- (Spain) David Marrero – Estoril (doubles)
- (Serbia) Novak Djokovic – London (doubles)
- (Argentina) Carlos Berlocq – Stuttgart (doubles)
- (Sweden) Johan Brunström – Gstaad (doubles)
- (Germany) Dustin Brown^{[d]} – Metz (doubles)
- (Serbia) Viktor Troicki – Bangkok (doubles)
- (Netherlands Antilles) Jean-Julien Rojer – Tokyo (doubles)
- (Russia) Igor Kunitsyn – Moscow (doubles)
- (United Kingdom) Andy Murray – Valencia (doubles)

The following players defended a main circuit title in singles, doubles, or mixed doubles:

- (France) Marc Gicquel – Brisbane (doubles)
- (Croatia) Marin Čilić – Chennai (singles), Zagreb (singles)
- (United States) Bob Bryan – Australian Open (doubles) , Delray Beach (doubles), Houston (doubles), Los Angeles (doubles), Beijing (doubles)
- (United States) Mike Bryan – Australian Open (doubles) , Delray Beach (doubles), Houston (doubles), Los Angeles (doubles), Beijing (doubles)
- (Canada) Daniel Nestor – Rotterdam (doubles), Monte Carlo (doubles), Barcelona (doubles)
- (Serbia) Nenad Zimonjić – Rotterdam (doubles), Monte Carlo (doubles), Barcelona (doubles)
- (Spain) Marcel Granollers – Costa do Sauípe (doubles)
- (France) Michaël Llodra – Marseille (doubles)
- (Serbia) Novak Djokovic – Dubai (singles), Beijing (singles)
- (Spain) Rafael Nadal – Monte Carlo (singles), Rome (singles)
- (Spain) Albert Montañés – Estoril (singles)
- (Poland) Mariusz Fyrstenberg – Eastbourne (doubles)
- (Poland) Marcin Matkowski – Eastbourne (doubles)
- (United States) Sam Querrey – Los Angeles (singles)
- (United Kingdom) Andy Murray – Toronto (singles)
- (Switzerland) Roger Federer – Cincinnati (singles)
- (Austria) Jürgen Melzer – Vienna (singles)

== Rankings ==
These are the ATP rankings of the top twenty singles players, doubles players, and the top ten doubles teams on the ATP Tour, at the end of the 2009 ATP World Tour, and of the 2010 season, with number of rankings points, number of tournaments played, year-end ranking in 2009, highest and lowest position during the season (for singles and doubles individual only, as doubles team rankings are not calculated over a rolling year-to-date system), and number of spots gained or lost from the 2009 to the 2010 year-end rankings.

=== Singles ===
as of December 28, 2009
| # | Player | Points |
|---|---|---|
| 1 | Roger Federer (SUI) | 10550 |
| 2 | Rafael Nadal (ESP) | 9205 |
| 3 | Novak Djokovic (SRB) | 8310 |
| 4 | Andy Murray (GBR) | 7030 |
| 5 | Juan Martín del Potro (ARG) | 6785 |
| 6 | Nikolay Davydenko (RUS) | 4930 |
| 7 | Andy Roddick (USA) | 4410 |
| 8 | Robin Söderling (SWE) | 3410 |
| 9 | Fernando Verdasco (ESP) | 3300 |
| 10 | Jo-Wilfried Tsonga (FRA) | 2875 |
| 11 | Fernando González (CHI) | 2870 |
| 12 | Radek Štěpánek (CZE) | 2625 |
| 13 | Gaël Monfils (FRA) | 2610 |
| 14 | Marin Čilić (CRO) | 2430 |
| 15 | Gilles Simon (FRA) | 2275 |
| 16 | Tommy Robredo (ESP) | 2175 |
| 17 | David Ferrer (ESP) | 1870 |
| 18 | Tommy Haas (GER) | 1855 |
| 19 | Mikhail Youzhny (RUS) | 1690 |
| 20 | Tomáš Berdych (CZE) | 1655 |

Year-end rankings 2010 (27 December 2010)
| # | Player | Points | #Trn | '09 Rk | High | Low | '09→'10 |
|---|---|---|---|---|---|---|---|
| 1 | Rafael Nadal (ESP) | 12450 | 17 | 2 | 1 | 4 | ▲1 |
| 2 | Roger Federer (SUI) | 9145 | 18 | 1 | 1 | 3 | ▼1 |
| 3 | Novak Djokovic (SRB) | 6240 | 20 | 3 | 2 | 3 | Steady |
| 4 | Andy Murray (GBR) | 5760 | 19 | 4 | 3 | 5 | Steady |
| 5 | Robin Söderling (SWE) | 5580 | 24 | 8 | 4 | 8 | ▲3 |
| 6 | Tomáš Berdych (CZE) | 3955 | 25 | 20 | 6 | 25 | ▲14 |
| 7 | David Ferrer (ESP) | 3735 | 24 | 17 | 7 | 19 | ▲10 |
| 8 | Andy Roddick (USA) | 3665 | 18 | 7 | 7 | 13 | ▼1 |
| 9 | Fernando Verdasco (ESP) | 3240 | 24 | 9 | 7 | 12 | Steady |
| 10 | Mikhail Youzhny (RUS) | 2920 | 22 | 19 | 8 | 20 | ▲9 |
| 11 | Jürgen Melzer (AUT) | 2785 | 27 | 28 | 11 | 32 | ▲17 |
| 12 | Gaël Monfils (FRA) | 2560 | 21 | 13 | 12 | 20 | ▲1 |
| 13 | Jo-Wilfried Tsonga (FRA) | 2345 | 16 | 10 | 9 | 13 | ▼3 |
| 14 | Marin Čilić (CRO) | 2300 | 24 | 14 | 9 | 15 | Steady |
| 15 | Nicolás Almagro (ESP) | 2160 | 27 | 26 | 15 | 40 | ▲11 |
| 16 | Mardy Fish (USA) | 1991 | 19 | 55 | 16 | 108 | ▲39 |
| 17 | Ivan Ljubičić (CRO) | 1965 | 20 | 24 | 13 | 26 | ▲7 |
| 18 | Sam Querrey (USA) | 1860 | 27 | 25 | 18 | 31 | ▲7 |
| 19 | John Isner (USA) | 1850 | 23 | 34 | 18 | 34 | ▲15 |
| 20 | Marcos Baghdatis (CYP) | 1785 | 28 | 42 | 18 | 42 | ▲22 |

==== Number 1 ranking ====
| Holder | Date gained | Date forfeited |
|---|---|---|
| Roger Federer (SUI) | Year-end 2009 | 6 June 2010 |
| Rafael Nadal (ESP) | 7 June 2010 | Year-end 2010 |

=== Doubles (Individual) ===
as of December 28, 2009
| # | Player | Points |
|---|---|---|
| 1 | Bob Bryan (USA) | 10480 |
| = | Mike Bryan (USA) | 10480 |
| 3 | Daniel Nestor (CAN) | 10410 |
| = | Nenad Zimonjić (SRB) | 10410 |
| 5 | Mark Knowles (BAH) | 6880 |
| 6 | Lukáš Dlouhý (CZE) | 6460 |
| 7 | Mahesh Bhupathi (IND) | 6260 |
| 8 | Leander Paes (IND) | 5890 |
| 9 | Andy Ram (ISR) | 4950 |
| 10 | Wesley Moodie (RSA) | 4550 |
| 11 | Max Mirnyi (BLR) | 4350 |
| 12 | Łukasz Kubot (POL) | 3880 |
| 13 | Oliver Marach (AUT) | 3790 |
| 14 | Michal Mertiňák (SVK) | 3740 |
| 15 | Dick Norman (BEL) | 3666 |
| 16 | František Čermák (CZE) | 3590 |
| 17 | Marcin Matkowski (POL) | 3490 |
| 18 | Mariusz Fyrstenberg (POL) | 3400 |
| 19 | Mardy Fish (USA) | 3275 |
| 20 | Tommy Robredo (ESP) | 2905 |

Year-end rankings 2010 (27 December 2010)
| # | Player | Points | #Trn | '09 Rk | High | Low | '09→'10 |
|---|---|---|---|---|---|---|---|
| 1 | Bob Bryan (USA) | 11500 | 25 | 1T | 1T | 3T | = |
| = | Mike Bryan (USA) | 11500 | 25 | 1T | 1T | 3T | = |
| 3 | Daniel Nestor (CAN) | 9150 | 25 | 3T | 1T | 3T | = |
| = | Nenad Zimonjić (SRB) | 9150 | 27 | 3T | 1T | 3T | = |
| 5 | Leander Paes (IND) | 5150 | 22 | 8 | 5 | 9 | ▲3 |
| 6 | Mahesh Bhupathi (IND) | 5085 | 23 | 7 | 6 | 15 | ▲1 |
| 7 | Max Mirnyi (BLR) | 5070 | 20 | 11 | 8 | 18 | ▲4 |
| 8 | Jürgen Melzer (AUT) | 4410 | 25 | 26 | 6 | 26 | ▲18 |
| 9 | Lukáš Dlouhý (CZE) | 4315 | 27 | 6 | 5 | 10 | ▼3 |
| 10 | Łukasz Kubot (POL) | 4140 | 26 | 12 | 7 | 15 | ▲2 |
| 11 | Oliver Marach (AUT) | 4050 | 30 | 13 | 8 | 16 | ▲2 |
| 12 | Mariusz Fyrstenberg (POL) | 3850 | 29 | 18 | 10T | 20 | ▲6 |
| = | Marcin Matkowski (POL) | 3850 | 29 | 17 | 10T | 19 | ▲5 |
| 14 | Wesley Moodie (RSA) | 3500 | 27 | 10 | 9 | 25 | ▼4 |
| 15 | Marc López (ESP) | 3385 | 24 | 62 | 14 | 88 | ▲47 |
| 16 | Rohan Bopanna (IND) | 3370 | 30 | 83 | 13 | 88 | ▲67 |
| 17 | Dick Norman (BEL) | 3350 | 31 | 15 | 10 | 24 | ▼2 |
| 18 | Aisam-ul-Haq Qureshi (PAK) | 3268 | 29 | 59 | 16 | 65 | ▲41 |
| 19 | Horia Tecău (ROU) | 3250 | 32 | 46 | 15 | 46 | ▲27 |
| 20 | Philipp Petzschner (GER) | 3200 | 19 | 55 | 19 | 63 | ▲35 |

=== Doubles (Team) ===
as of December 28, 2009
| # | Team | Points |
|---|---|---|
| 1 | Bob Bryan (USA); Mike Bryan (USA) | 10800 |
| 2 | Daniel Nestor (CAN); Nenad Zimonjić (SRB) | 10710 |
| 3 | Mahesh Bhupathi (IND); Mark Knowles (BAH) | 6350 |
| 4 | Lukáš Dlouhý (CZE); Leander Paes (IND) | 5740 |
| 5 | Max Mirnyi (BLR); Andy Ram (ISR) | 4350 |
| 6 | František Čermák (CZE); Michal Mertiňák (SVK) | 3980 |
| 7 | Łukasz Kubot (POL); Oliver Marach (AUT) | 3970 |
| 8 | Mariusz Fyrstenberg (POL); Marcin Matkowski (POL) | 3535 |
| 9 | Wesley Moodie (RSA); Dick Norman (BEL) | 3295 |
| 10 | Bruno Soares (BRA); Kevin Ullyett (ZIM) | 2560 |

Year-end rankings 2010 (27 December 2010)
| # | Team | Points | #Trn | '09 Rk | '09→'10 |
|---|---|---|---|---|---|
| 1 | Bob Bryan (USA); Mike Bryan (USA) | 11680 | 23 | 1 | Steady |
| 2 | Daniel Nestor (CAN); Nenad Zimonjić (SRB) | 9580 | 25 | 2 | Steady |
| 3 | Mahesh Bhupathi (IND); Max Mirnyi (BLR) | 5070 | 20 | — | ▲NR |
| 4 | Mariusz Fyrstenberg (POL); Marcin Matkowski (POL) | 4120 | 29 | 8 | ▲4 |
| 5 | Lukáš Dlouhý (CZE); Leander Paes (IND) | 4015 | 19 | 4 | ▼1 |
| 6 | Łukasz Kubot (POL); Oliver Marach (AUT) | 3935 | 24 | 7 | ▲1 |
| 7 | Wesley Moodie (RSA); Dick Norman (BEL) | 3575 | 21 | 9 | ▲2 |
| 8 | Rohan Bopanna (IND); Aisam-ul-Haq Qureshi (PAK) | 3265 | 23 | 232T | ▲224 |
| 9 | František Čermák (CZE); Michal Mertiňák (SVK) | 2980 | 27 | 6 | ▼3 |
| 10 | Jürgen Melzer (AUT); Philipp Petzschner (GER) | 2945 | 13 | — | ▲NR |

== Prize money leaders ==
As of 6 December 2010.

| # | Country | Player | Year-to-date |
|---|---|---|---|
| 1. | ESP | Rafael Nadal | $10,171,998 |
| 2. | SUI | Roger Federer | $7,698,289 |
| 3. | SRB | Novak Djokovic | $4,278,857 |
| 4. | GBR | Andy Murray | $4,046,805 |
| 5. | SWE | Robin Söderling | $3,731,527 |
| 6. | ESP | David Ferrer | $2,593,353 |
| 7. | CZE | Tomáš Berdych | $2,509,122 |
| 8. | AUT | Jürgen Melzer | $2,037,084 |
| 9. | ESP | Fernando Verdasco | $1,971,365 |
| 10. | USA | Andy Roddick | $1,917,612 |

== Statistics leaders ==
As of November 29, 2010.

ACES
| Pos | Player | Aces | Matches |
|---|---|---|---|
| 1 | (United States) John Isner | 1,048 | 60 |
| 2 | (United States) Andy Roddick | 815 | 66 |
| 3 | (Sweden) Robin Söderling | 739 | 75 |
| 4 | (United States) Sam Querrey | 709 | 60 |
| 5 | (Switzerland) Roger Federer | 658 | 78 |
| 6 | (United States) Mardy Fish | 567 | 52 |
| 7 | (France) Gaël Monfils | 565 | 61 |
| 8 | (Serbia) Viktor Troicki | 558 | 62 |
| 9 | (Czech Republic) Tomáš Berdych | 547 | 68 |
| 10 | (Spain) Nicolás Almagro | 541 | 67 |

SERVICE GAMES WON
| Pos | Player | % | Matches |
|---|---|---|---|
| 1 | (United States) Andy Roddick | 91 | 66 |
| 2 | (Spain) Rafael Nadal | 90 | 81 |
| 3 | (United States) John Isner | 90 | 60 |
| 4 | (Switzerland) Roger Federer | 89 | 78 |
| 5 | (Czech Republic) Tomáš Berdych | 87 | 68 |
| 6 | (Sweden) Robin Söderling | 86 | 75 |
| 7 | (United States) Sam Querrey | 86 | 60 |
| 8 | (France) Jo-Wilfried Tsonga | 86 | 45 |
| 9 | (United States) Mardy Fish | 85 | 52 |
| 10 | (Netherlands) Thiemo de Bakker | 85 | 49 |
| = | (Spain) Feliciano López | 85 | 49 |

BREAK POINTS SAVED
| Pos | Player | % | Matches |
|---|---|---|---|
| 1 | (Spain) Rafael Nadal | 69 | 89 |
| 2 | (United States) Andy Roddick | 69 | 66 |
| 3 | (United States) John Isner | 69 | 60 |
| 4 | (Croatia) Marin Čilić | 69 | 59 |
| 5 | (Switzerland) Roger Federer | 68 | 78 |
| 6 | (Spain) Feliciano López | 68 | 49 |
| 7 | (Serbia) Novak Djokovic | 67 | 72 |
| 8 | (Czech Republic) Tomáš Berdych | 67 | 68 |
| 9 | (United States) Sam Querrey | 67 | 60 |
| 10 | (Switzerland) Stanislas Wawrinka | 67 | 52 |

FIRST SERVE PERCENTAGE
| Pos | Player | % | Matches |
|---|---|---|---|
| 1 | (Italy) Potito Starace | 74 | 48 |
| 2 | (Spain) Juan Carlos Ferrero | 72 | 47 |
| = | (Romania) Victor Hănescu | 72 | 47 |
| 4 | (Finland) Jarkko Nieminen | 70 | 54 |
| 5 | (United States) Andy Roddick | 69 | 66 |
| 6 | (United States) John Isner | 69 | 60 |
| 7 | (Spain) Rafael Nadal | 67 | 81 |
| 8 | (Spain) Fernando Verdasco | 67 | 64 |
| 9 | (Uzbekistan) Denis Istomin | 66 | 58 |
| 10 | (France) Julien Benneteau | 66 | 43 |

FIRST SERVICE POINTS WON
| Pos | Player | % | Matches |
|---|---|---|---|
| 1 | (United States) Mardy Fish | 80 | 52 |
| 2 | (Czech Republic) Tomáš Berdych | 79 | 68 |
| 3 | (United States) Andy Roddick | 79 | 66 |
| 4 | (United States) Sam Querrey | 79 | 60 |
| 5 | (Switzerland) Roger Federer | 78 | 78 |
| 6 | (Sweden) Robin Söderling | 78 | 75 |
| 7 | (United Kingdom) Andy Murray | 77 | 64 |
| 8 | (Spain) Feliciano López | 77 | 49 |
| 9 | (Cyprus) Marcos Baghdatis | 76 | 68 |
| 10 | (United States) John Isner | 76 | 60 |

SECOND SERVE POINTS WON
| Pos | Player | % | Matches |
|---|---|---|---|
| 1 | (Spain) Rafael Nadal | 60 | 81 |
| 2 | (United States) Andy Roddick | 57 | 66 |
| 3 | (Switzerland) Roger Federer | 56 | 78 |
| 4 | (Spain) Juan Carlos Ferrero | 56 | 47 |
| 5 | (Spain) David Ferrer | 55 | 81 |
| 6 | (Austria) Jürgen Melzer | 55 | 72 |
| 7 | (Czech Republic) Tomáš Berdych | 55 | 68 |
| 8 | (United States) John Isner | 55 | 60 |
| 9 | (Spain) Nicolás Almagro | 54 | 67 |
| 10 | (France) Richard Gasquet | 54 | 60 |

POINTS WON RETURNING 1ST SERVICE
| Pos | Player | % | Matches |
|---|---|---|---|
| 1 | (Argentina) Juan Ignacio Chela | 35 | 52 |
| 2 | (Argentina) Juan Mónaco | 35 | 49 |
| 3 | (Switzerland) Roger Federer | 34 | 78 |
| 4 | (Serbia) Novak Djokovic | 34 | 72 |
| 5 | (Spain) Juan Carlos Ferrero | 34 | 47 |
| 6 | (Spain) David Ferrer | 33 | 81 |
| 7 | (Uruguay) Pablo Cuevas | 33 | 42 |
| 8 | (United Kingdom) Andy Murray | 32 | 64 |
| = | (Spain) Fernando Verdasco | 32 | 64 |
| 10 | (Serbia) Viktor Troicki | 32 | 62 |

BREAK POINTS CONVERTED
| Pos | Player | % | Matches |
|---|---|---|---|
| 1 | (Spain) Juan Carlos Ferrero | 46 | 47 |
| 2 | (Serbia) Novak Djokovic | 45 | 72 |
| 3 | (Argentina) Juan Ignacio Chela | 45 | 52 |
| 4 | (France) Michaël Llodra | 45 | 48 |
| 5 | (Spain) David Ferrer | 44 | 81 |
| = | (Spain) Rafael Nadal | 44 | 81 |
| 7 | (Sweden) Robin Söderling | 44 | 75 |
| 8 | (Russia) Mikhail Youzhny | 44 | 58 |
| 9 | (United States) Mardy Fish | 44 | 52 |
| 10 | (Serbia) Viktor Troicki | 43 | 62 |

RETURN GAMES WON
| Pos | Player | % | Matches |
|---|---|---|---|
| 1 | (Serbia) Novak Djokovic | 32 | 72 |
| 2 | (Argentina) Juan Ignacio Chela | 32 | 52 |
| 3 | (Spain) Juan Carlos Ferrero | 32 | 47 |
| 4 | (Spain) David Ferrer | 31 | 81 |
| 5 | (United Kingdom) Andy Murray | 30 | 64 |
| 6 | (Spain) Rafael Nadal | 29 | 81 |
| 7 | (Russia) Nikolay Davydenko | 29 | 47 |
| 8 | (Argentina) Juan Mónaco | 28 | 49 |
| 9 | (Switzerland) Roger Federer | 27 | 78 |
| 10 | (Spain) Fernando Verdasco | 27 | 64 |

== Best 5 matches by ATPWorldTour.com ==
| | Event | Round | Surface | Winner | Opponent | Result |
|---|---|---|---|---|---|---|
| 1. | ATP Finals | SF | Hard (i) | (Spain) Rafael Nadal | (United Kingdom) Andy Murray | 7–6^{(7–5)}, 3–6, 7–6^{(8–6)} |
| 2. | US Open | SF | Hard | (Serbia) Novak Djokovic | (Switzerland) Roger Federer | 5–7, 6–1, 5–7, 6–2, 7–5 |
| 3. | Wimbledon | R1 | Grass | (United States) John Isner | (France) Nicolas Mahut | 6–4, 3–6, 6–7^{(7–9)}, 7–6^{(7–3)}, 70–68 |
| 4. | Paris Masters | SF | Hard (i) | (Sweden) Robin Söderling | (France) Michaël Llodra | 6–7^{(0–7)}, 7–5, 7–6^{(7–5)} |
| 5. | Paris Masters | SF | Hard (i) | (France) Gaël Monfils | (Switzerland) Roger Federer | 7–6^{(9–7)}, 6–7^{(1–7)}, 7–6^{(7–4)} |

== Point distribution ==
| Tournament Category | W | F | SF (3rd/4th) | QF | R16 | R32 | R64 | R128 | Additional qualifying points |
|---|---|---|---|---|---|---|---|---|---|
| Grand Slam | 2000 | 1200 | 720 | 360 | 180 | 90 | 45 | 10 | 25 |
| ATP World Tour Finals | 1500^ 1100^{m} | 1000^ 600^{m} | 600^ 200^{m} | (200 for each round robin match win, +400 for a semifinal win, +500 for the final win) | | | | | |
| Masters 1000 | 1000 | 600 | 360 | 180 | 90 | 45 | 10 (25) | (10) | 25 |
| 500 | 500 | 300 | 180 | 90 | 45 | (20) | | | 20 |
| 250 | 250 | 150 | 90 | 45 | 20 | (10) | | | 12 |

- (ATP World Tour Masters 1000) Qualifying points changes to 12 points only if the main draw is larger than 56
- (ATP World Tour 500) Qualifying points changes to 10 points only if the main draw is larger than 32
- (ATP World Tour 250) Qualifying points changes to 5 points only if the main draw is larger than 32

Davis Cup
| Rubber category | | Match win | Match loss | Team bonus | Performance bonus | Total achievable |
|---|---|---|---|---|---|---|
| Singles | Play-offs | 5 / 10^{1} | | | | 15 |
| Singles | First round | 40 | 10^{2} | | | 80 |
| Singles | Quarterfinals | 65 | | | | 130 |
| Singles | Semifinals | 70 | | | | 140 |
| Singles | Final | 75 | | 75^{3} | 125^{4} | 150 / 225^{3} / 275^{4} |
| Singles | Cumulative total | 500 | | 500 to 535^{3} | 625^{4} | 625^{4} |
| Doubles | Play-offs | 10 | | | | 10 |
| Doubles | First round | 50 | 10^{2} | | | 50 |
| Doubles | Quarterfinals | 80 | | | | 80 |
| Doubles | Semifinals | 90 | | | | 90 |
| Doubles | Final | 95 | | 35^{5} | | 95 / 130^{5} |
| Doubles | Cumulative total | 315 | | 350^{5} | | 350^{5} |

The Davis Cup World Group and World Group Play-Off matches awarded ATP Ranking points from 2009 to 2015.

Glossary

Only live matches earn points; dead rubbers earn no points. If a player does not compete in the singles of one or more rounds he will receive points from the previous round when playing singles at the next tie. This last rule also applies for playing in doubles matches.

^{1} A player who wins a singles rubber in the first day of the tie is awarded 5 points, whereas a singles rubber win in tie's last day grants 10 points for a total of 15 available points.

^{2} For the first round only, any player who competes in a live rubber, without a win, receives 10 ranking points for participation.

^{3} Team bonus awarded to a singles player who wins 7 live matches in a calendar year and his team wins the competition.

^{4} Performance bonus awarded to a singles player who wins 8 live matches in a calendar year. In this case, no Team bonus is awarded.

^{5} Team bonus awarded to an unchanged doubles team who wins 4 matches in a calendar year and his team wins the competition.

World Team Cup
| Match type | 1st round | 2nd round | 3rd round | Finals | Points | Bonus | Total |
|---|---|---|---|---|---|---|---|
| Singles 1 | 35 | 35 | 35 | 95 | 200 | 50 | 250 |
| Singles 2 | 25 | 25 | 25 | 50 | 125 | 50 | 175 |
| Deciding match (doubles) | 35 | 35 | 35 | 95 | 200 | 50 | 250 |
| Dead rubber (doubles) | 10 | 10 | 10 | 20 | 50 | | 50 |

- Players who only play the finals will be awarded points from the previous round.
- Players must win all 4 matches and be part of the winning team in order to earn the Bonus Points.

== Retirements and comebacks ==
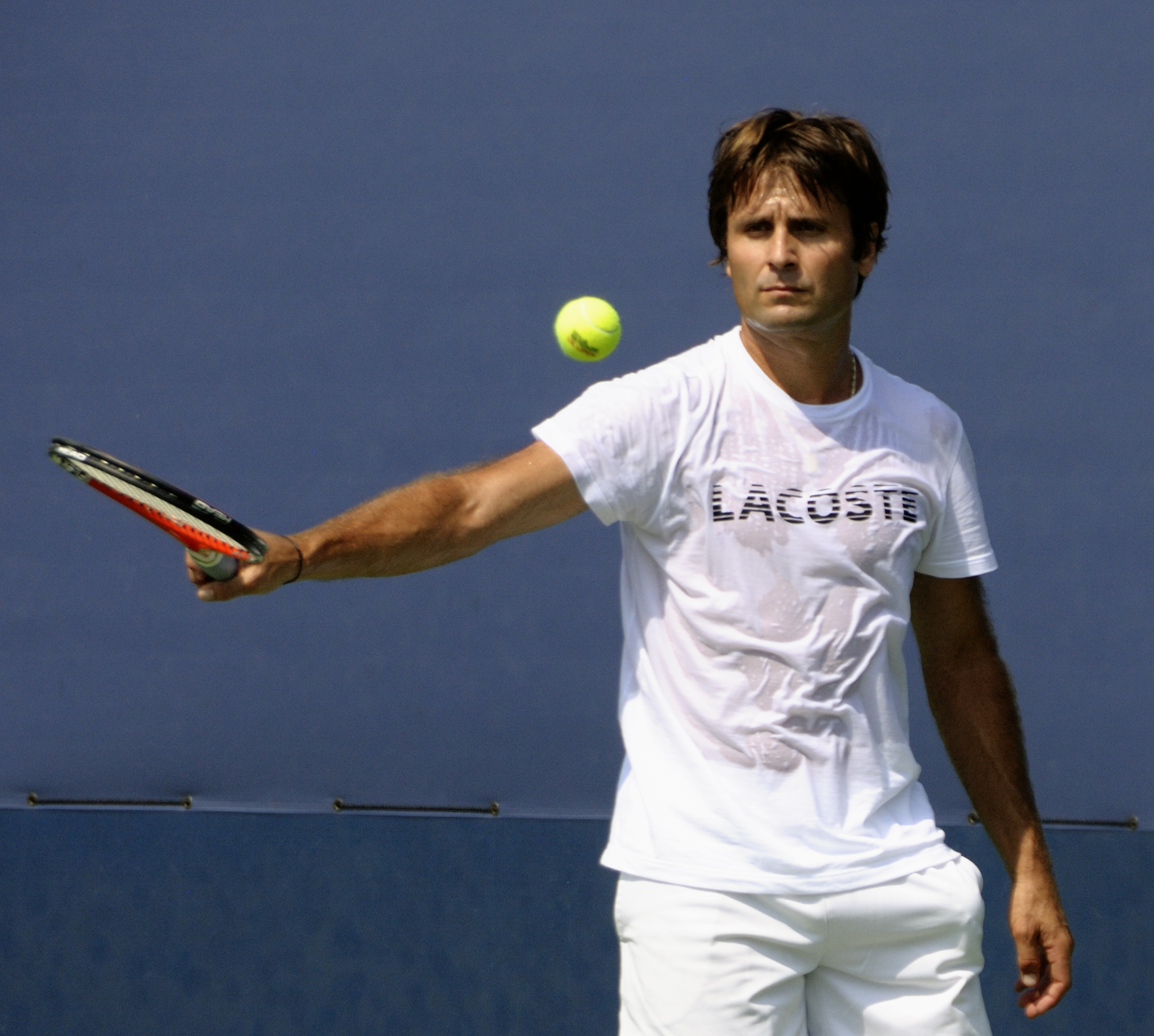
Frenchman Fabrice Santoro broke several longevity records on the tour in a career spanning from 1989 to 2010.

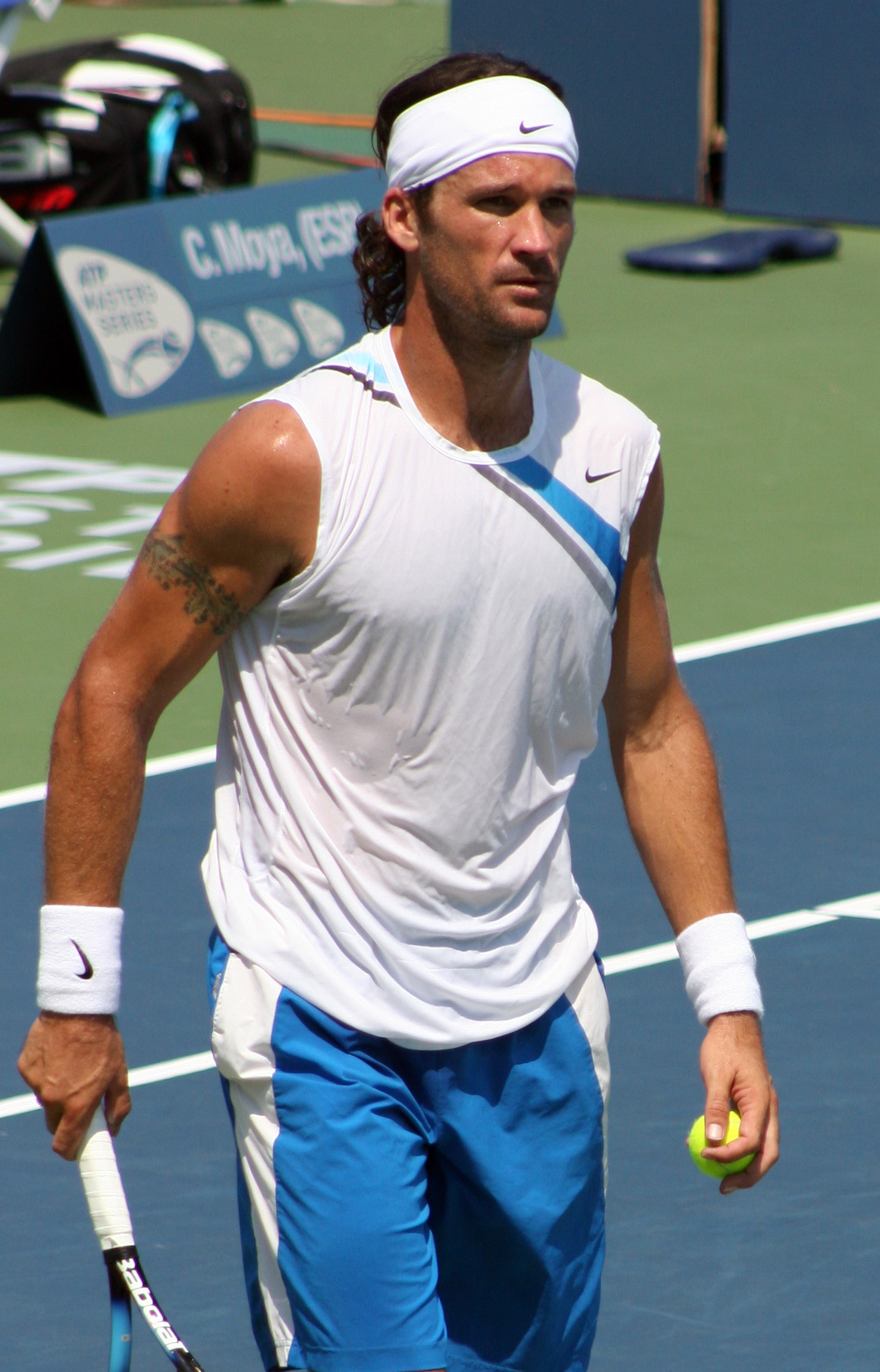
Former world No. 1, 1998 French Open champion Carlos Moyà ended his professional career due to a recurring injury.

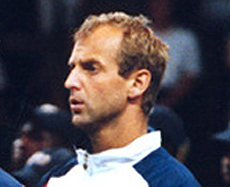
Former world No. 1 Thomas Muster from Austria returned to the tour after a ten-year hiatus.

Following is a list of notable players (winners of a main tour title, and/or part of the ATP rankings top 100 (singles) or top 50 (doubles) for at least one week) who announced their retirement from professional tennis during the 2010 season:

- (France) Thierry Ascione (born January 17, 1981, in Villeurbanne, France) turned professional in 2000, reached his career-high singles ranking, No. 81, in 2004. Ascione had his best results on the ATP Challenger Tour, where he collected eight singles titles. He played his last match on the main tour in Metz in September.
- (Morocco) Younes El Aynaoui (born September 12, 1971, in Rabat, Morocco) entered the tour in 1990, and was ranked No. 14 in singles in 2003. He collected five titles on the main circuit, and reached four Grand Slam quarterfinals, at the Australian Open (2000, 2003) and the US Open (2002, 2003). Regularly injured since 2004, El Aynaoui made several comeback attempts before deciding to close his career in Doha in January.
- (Argentina) Guillermo Cañas (born December 25, 1977, in Buenos Aires, Argentina) turned professional in 1995, and peaked No. 8 in singles in 2005 and No. 47 in doubles in 2002. He won seven titles in singles (including the 2002 Toronto Masters), two in doubles, and reached the quarterfinals of the French Open three times (2002, 2005, 2007). Suspended for doping in 2005, Cañas was acquitted in 2006 and returned to the tour in 2007, finishing the year ranked no. 15. He played his last match in the Hamburg qualifying in July 2009.
- (Czech Republic) Martin Damm (born August 12, 1972, in Liberec, Czech Republic, then Czechoslovakia) joined the circuit in 1990, becoming No. 42 in singles in 1997, and eventually No. 5 in doubles in 2007. Damm won 40 doubles titles during his career, among which four ATP Masters Series titles out of seven finals and one Grand Slam title at the US Open (2006, with Leander Paes) out of three finals. He played his last match in September in New York and started a coaching career with 18-year-old ATP pro Ryan Harrison.
- (United States) Taylor Dent (born April 24, 1981, in Newport Beach, United States) became a tennis pro in 1998, and reached his highest singles ranking, No. 21, in 2005. The son of former ATP pro Phil Dent, Taylor Dent collected four singles titles on the main circuit, last playing at the Charlottesville Challenger in November.
- (France) Sébastien Grosjean (born May 29, 1978, in Marseille, France) turned professional in 1996 and peaked at the No. 4 ranking in late 2002, finishing two seasons in the top 10 (2001, 2003). One-time runner-up at the Tennis Masters Cup (2001, lost to Hewitt), Grosjean won four singles and five doubles titles in his career, and made four Grand Slam semifinals, at the Australian Open (2001), at the French Open (2001) and at Wimbledon (2003, 2004). He played his last match in March in Sunrise, and retired during the French Open in May.
- (Slovakia) Dominik Hrbatý (born 4 January 1978 in Bratislava, Slovakia) retired after 14 years of professional play citing the reason as being able to spend more time with his family as his wife was due to give birth in December. He was one of the two active players to have a positive win–loss records against Rafael Nadal. He reached the 1999 French Open semifinals only to lose to the eventual champion Andre Agassi. On the team ground, he was more successful, winning the 2005 and 2009 Hopman Cup and reaching the 2005 Davis Cup final as a recurring member of the Slovakia Davis Cup team. The same year he was elected Slovakian sportsman of the year. He peaked the ATP rankings on 12 October 2004. He has six singles career titles.
- (Germany) Nicolas Kiefer (born July 5, 1977, in Holzminden, Germany, then-West Germany) joined the circuit in 1995, ranking as high as No. 4 in singles in 2000. An Australian Open and US Open boys' singles champion (1995), Kiefer went on to win six singles and three doubles titles on the main tour. In majors, he reached the quarterfinals at Wimbledon (1997) and the US Open (2000), and the semis in Melbourne (2006). Partnering countryman Rainer Schüttler, Kiefer also took the silver medal in doubles at the 2004 Athens Olympics, losing the final in five sets (lost to González/Massú). Injured during most of 2010, he played his last event in November, in doubles, at an ATP Challenger event in Aachen, Germany.
- (Spain) Alberto Martín (born August 20, 1978, in Barcelona, Spain) entered the circuit in 1995 and reached his highest ranking, No. 34, in 2001. A French Open junior singles champion in 1996, Martín won three singles and three doubles titles (all on clay courts) on the main tour. He last competed at the Braunschweig Challenger in June.
- (Spain) Carlos Moyá (born August 26, 1976, in Palma, Majorca, Spain) joined the main tour in 1995, and became the first Spaniard to be ranked world No. 1 on March 15, 1999, holding the position for two weeks. Finishing five seasons within the top 10 (1997–1998, 2002–2004), Moyá went past the fourth round at all Grand Slam tournaments but Wimbledon, his best results being one US Open semifinal (1998), one Australian Open final (1997, lost to Sampras), and one French Open title, his only major victory (1998, def. Corretja). Also a one-time runner-up at the ÀTP Tour World Championships (1998, lost to Corretja), Moyá collected 20 singles titles during his career, among which three ATP Masters Series shields (Monte Carlo (1998), Cincinnati (2002), and Rome (2004)), and was on the team that clinched the Davis Cup trophy in 2004. The Spaniard struggled with a foot injury for more than a year before deciding to retire, playing his last match in Madrid in May. A goodbye ceremony involving Rafael Nadal, Roger Federer, Novak Djokovic, Andy Murray and Andy Roddick was held in November during the ATP World Tour Finals in London.
- (France) Fabrice Santoro (born December 9, 1972, in Tahiti, French Polynesia, France) joined the tour in 1989, and ranked as high as No. 17 in singles in 2001, and No. 6 in doubles in 1999. Junior French Open champion in 1989, Santoro gathered six singles titles, 24 doubles titles, and one mixed doubles title at the French Open (2005, with Daniela Hantuchová) during his pro career. A one-time Grand Slam quarterfinalist in singles at the Australian Open (2006), Santoro reached five major and two year-end championships doubles finals, titling twice in Melbourne (2003, 2004) and once at the Tennis Masters Cup (2005), partnering Michaël Llodra for each win. The Frenchman holds the record for most consecutive appearances in Grand Slam draws (70 from 1998 to 2010), and is the only player to have competed in four different decades (from the 1980s to the 2010s).
- (Thailand) Paradorn Srichaphan (born June 14, 1979, in Khon Kaen, Thailand) joined the professional circuit in 1997, and ranked as high as No. 9 in singles in mid-2003, though he never finished a season within the top 10. Twice a recipient of the Stefan Edberg Sportsmanship Award, Srichaphan titled five times in singles on the main tour. He last competed in a doubles match during the PTT Thailand Open in September 2009. Srichaphan now captains the Thailand Davis Cup team.
- (Zimbabwe) Kevin Ullyett (born May 23, 1972, in Salisbury, Rhodesia (now Harare, Zimbabwe)) came on the tour in 1990, becoming a doubles specialist and peaking at No. 4 in 2005. Ullyett gathered 34 doubles titles during his 19-year career (including five ATP Masters Series titles) and one mixed doubles title at the Australian Open (2002, with Daniela Hantuchová). He won two Grand Slam doubles titles out of three finals, at the US Open (2001) and at the Australian Open (2005), partnering Wayne Black for each win. He last played at Wimbledon in June.
- (Argentina) Mariano Zabaleta (born February 28, 1978, in Tandil, Argentina) joined the tour in 1996 and was ranked No. 21 in singles in 2000. Zabaleta won three singles titles in his career and reached one Grand Slam quarterfinal at the US Open (2001). He last played at the Lima Challenger in November 2009, and officially announced his retirement in May.

Following is a list of notable players (winners of a main tour title, and/or part of the ATP rankings top 100 (singles) or top 50 (doubles) for at least one week) who came out of retirement from professional tennis during the 2010 season:

- (Austria) Thomas Muster (born October 2, 1967, in Leibnitz, Austria) first joined the tour in 1985 before unofficially retiring in 1999. Ranked world No. 1 for a total of six weeks in 1996, Muster finished five seasons in the top 10 (1990, 1993, 1995–1997), and won 44 singles titles on the main circuit during his career, including eight Super 9 titles and one Grand Slam trophy at the French Open (1995, def. Chang). Muster returned this year on the ATP Challenger Tour, playing his first pro match in ten years in Braunschweig in June. He entered several Challenger events during the rest of the season, making one main tour appearance at the Vienna 250 event. Muster finished the season ranked 980 in singles.
- (Hungary) Sándor Noszály (born March 16, 1972, in Budapest, Hungary) joined the ATP Challenger Tour in 1989 both in singles and doubles at the age of 17. In 1995 he reached the quarterfinal of 1995 Austrian Open losing to Thomas Muster and the semifinal of 1995 Romanian Open losing again to the Austrian. Thus he became ranked No. 95 in the world. The same year—maturing from being the youngest member ever (16 ages old) of the Davis Cup team—he pushed Hungary to the World Group for the second time (1993) after beating former champions Australia in the play-off. He returned to international tennis in the 2010 Sarasota Open after a 7-year gap competing only in the unofficial non-ATP event Hungarian National Tennis Championships, which he had won 16 times.

== See also ==
- 2010 WTA Tour
- 2010 ATP Challenger Tour
- 2010 ITF Women's Circuit
- Association of Tennis Professionals
- International Tennis Federation

== Notes ==
- ^{a} Robin Söderling won the final after Mikhail Youzhny retired because of a right hamstring injury.
- ^{b} Daniel Nestor and Nenad Zimonjić won the final after Mahesh Bhupathi and Max Mirnyi were forced to retire because of a left leg injury contracted by Bhupathi.
- ^{c} Albert Montañés won the final after Gaël Monfils retired because of a right ankle injury.
- ^{d} Dustin Brown decided to play under the German flag starting in October – he was still representing Jamaica when he won the Metz doubles in September.
