= 2010 Novak Djokovic tennis season =

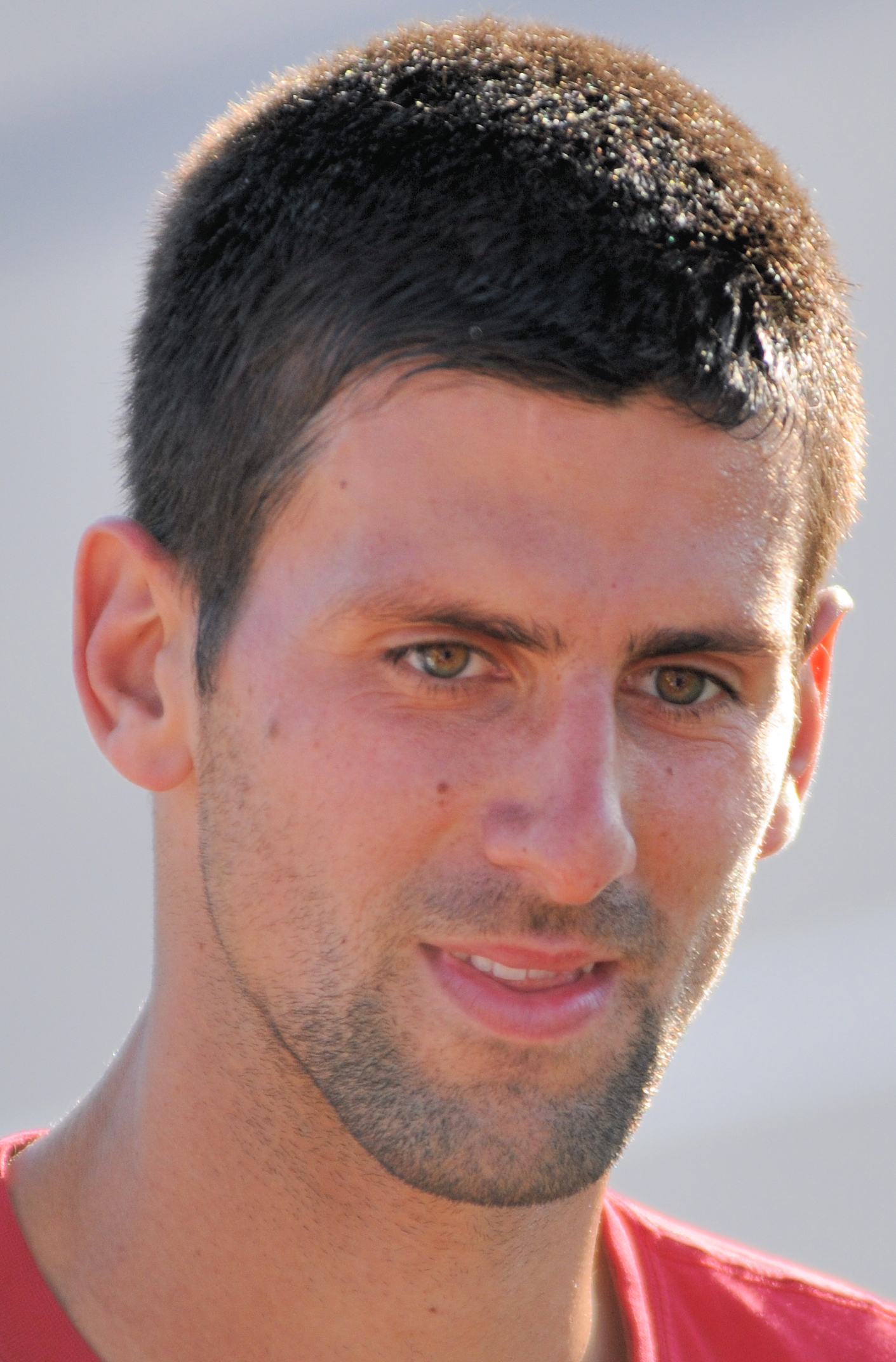
- A close up of Djokovic at Indian Wells
- Full name: Novak Djokovic
- Country: Serbia
- Calendar prize money: $4,278,856 (singles & doubles)

Singles
- Season record: 61–18
- Calendar titles: 2
- Year-end ranking: No. 3
- Ranking change from previous year: Steady

Grand Slam & significant results
- Australian Open: QF
- French Open: QF
- Wimbledon: SF
- US Open: F
- Other tournaments
- Tour Finals: SF

Doubles
- Season record: 7–5
- Calendar titles: 1
- Current ranking: No. 163
- Ranking change from previous year: ▼49

Davis Cup
- Davis Cup: W

The 2010 Novak Djokovic tennis season officially commenced on January 4 with the start of the 2010 ATP World Tour.

== Yearly summary ==
=== Early hard court season ===
After playing nearly a hundred matches in 2009, Djokovic stated that he was "fed up with matches", so he decided not to play any ranking tournaments before the Australian Open, thus starting his year by playing in the AAMI Classic, an exhibition event, where he beat Tommy Haas, but lost to Fernando Verdasco and teenager Bernard Tomic.

==== Australian Open ====
Djokovic eased through the initial four rounds of the first Grand Slam of the year, dropping just one set to Marco Chiudinelli. In a repeat of the 2008 final, Djokovic faced Jo-Wilfried Tsonga in the quarter-finals. Tsonga "gained revenge with an absorbing – albeit error-strewn – victory against the third seed in a match lasting almost four hours." Djokovic had convincingly won the third set 6–1 but soon after left the court having told the umpire that he was about to vomit. After the medical time out, Djokovic returned to the court but "quickly found himself 5–0 down and never really recovered." Tsonga eventually progressed by way of a 7–6^{(8–6)} 6–7^{(5–7)} 1–6 6–3 6–1 victory.

==== Dubai Tennis Championships ====
Despite the loss, he attained a career-high ranking of No. 2 and went on to reach the semifinals in Rotterdam, where he lost to Mikhail Youzhny. At the Dubai Championships, Djokovic reached the final, this time defeating Youzhny to win his first title of the year and to successfully defend a title for the first time in his career.

==== Indian Wells and Miami Opens ====
After early exits at the Indian Wells Open and Miami Open, Djokovic announced that he had ceased working with Todd Martin as his coach.

=== Clay court season ===
On 6–8 March 2010, Djokovic then took part in Serbia's Davis Cup tie against the United States on clay in Belgrade, where he played a key role in helping his country reach the quarterfinal in the Davis Cup for the first time in its independent history, winning both singles matches against Sam Querrey and John Isner in a 3–2 victory.

At the Monte-Carlo Masters, top-seeded Djokovic reached the semifinals with wins over Wawrinka and David Nalbandian before losing to Verdasco. Djokovic again lost to Verdasco at the Italian Open in Rome, this time in the quarterfinals. As the defending champion at his hometown event, the Serbia Open in Belgrade, he withdrew in the quarterfinals while trailing No. 319 Filip Krajinović, the lowest-ranked player to ever beat Djokovic as well as the only time that Djokovic lost to a player outside the Top 200.

==== French Open ====
Djokovic entered the French Open seeded third. He defeated Evgeny Korolev, Kei Nishikori, Victor Hănescu, and Robby Ginepri en route to the quarter-finals, where he lost to No. 22 Jürgen Melzer in a five-set match that lasted 4 hours and 15 minutes, marking the first of two instances he lost a match at a major after leading two sets to love. Despite suffering from hayfever-like symptoms, Djokovic managed to save two match points before eventually relinquishing the match. It was the first time Melzer reached the last four of a Grand Slam event.

=== Grass court season ===
Djokovic then won the first ATP doubles titles of his career at the Aegon Championships, pairing with Jonathan Erlich to beat Karol Beck and David Škoch in the final.

==== Wimbledon ====
Again seeded third, Djokovic defeated Olivier Rochus, Taylor Dent and Albert Montañés to set up a fourth-round encounter with former Wimbledon champion Lleyton Hewitt. Djokovic eventually progressed to his second Wimbledon semi-final against Tomáš Berdych, the Czech having upset Roger Federer in the previous round. "Djokovic had won both the previous matches between the two and as the world no. 3 was the higher-ranked player, far more experienced at this level, having played in six previous semi-finals." Nevertheless, Berdych overcame Djokovic in straight sets, setting up a final with Rafael Nadal.

=== Fall hard court season ===
Djokovic then competed at the Canadian Open in Toronto, where he lost to Federer in the semifinals. Djokovic also competed in doubles with Nadal in a one-time, high-profile partnership. This had not happened since 1976, when Jimmy Connors and Arthur Ashe as No. 1 and No. 2 paired together as a doubles team. They lost in the first round to Canadians Milos Raonic and Vasek Pospisil.

==== Cincinnati Open ====
Djokovic then lost to Roddick in the quarterfinals of the Cincinnati Open.

==== US Open ====
Djokovic came very close to losing in his opening round against Viktor Troicki in extreme heat. He then defeated Philipp Petzschner, James Blake, Mardy Fish, and no. 17 seed Gaël Monfils, all in straight sets, to reach the US Open semifinals for the fourth consecutive year. In the semifinals, Djokovic defeated Roger Federer in five sets after saving 2 match points with forehand winners while serving to stay in the match at 4–5 in the 5th set. It was Djokovic's first victory over Federer at the US Open in four attempts and his first victory over Federer in a Major since the 2008 Australian Open. Djokovic lost to Nadal in the final, a match that saw Nadal complete his career Grand Slam.

==== China Open ====
After helping Serbia defeat the Czech Republic 3–2 to make it to the Davis Cup final, Djokovic competed at the China Open as the top seed, where he successfully defended his title after defeating David Ferrer in the final. At the Shanghai Masters, Djokovic made a semifinal appearance, losing to Federer.

==== ATP Finals ====
Djokovic played his final tournament of the year at the ATP Finals in London, where he lost to Federer in the semifinals.

==== Davis Cup glory ====
Serbia progressed to the Davis Cup final, following the victories over Croatia (4–1) and the Czech Republic (3–2). Serbia came from 1–2 down to defeat France in the final tie 3–2 in Belgrade to win the nation's first Davis Cup Championship. In the final, Djokovic scored two singles points for Serbia, defeating Gilles Simon and Gaël Monfils. He was the backbone of the Serbian squad, going 7–0 in singles rubbers to lead the nation to the title, although the honour of winning the deciding rubber in the final went to compatriot Viktor Troicki. These two singles rubbers wins started a long unbeaten run that went on into 2011.

Djokovic finished the year ranked No. 3, his fourth successive finish at this position. He was awarded the title "Serbian Sportsman of the year" by the Olympic Committee of Serbia and "Serbian Athlete of the year" by DSL Sport.

== All matches ==
This table chronicles all the matches of Djokovic in 2010, including walkovers (W/O) which the ATP does not count as wins. They are marked ND for non-decision or no decision.

Key
W	F	SF	QF	#R	RR	Q#	P#	DNQ	A	Z#	PO	G	S	B	NMS	NTI	P	NH

(W) winner; (F) finalist; (SF) semifinalist; (QF) quarterfinalist; (#R) rounds 4, 3, 2, 1; (RR) round-robin stage; (Q#) qualification round; (P#) preliminary round; (DNQ) did not qualify; (A) absent; (Z#) Davis/Fed Cup Zonal Group (with number indication) or (PO) play-off; (G) gold, (S) silver or (B) bronze Olympic/Paralympic medal; (NMS) not a Masters tournament; (NTI) not a Tier I tournament; (P) postponed; (NH) not held; (SR) strike rate (events won / competed); (W–L) win–loss record.
To avoid confusion and double counting, these charts are updated at the conclusion of a tournament or when the player's participation has ended.

=== Singles matches ===
Tournament	#	Round	Opponent	Rank	Result	Score
Australian Open; Melbourne, Australia; Grand Slam tournament Hard, outdoor January 18, 2010
Australian Open; Melbourne, Australia; Grand Slam tournament Hard, outdoor January 18, 2010	1 / 351	1R	(Spain) Daniel Gimeno Traver	74	Win	7–5, 6–3, 6–2
Australian Open; Melbourne, Australia; Grand Slam tournament Hard, outdoor January 18, 2010	2 / 352	2R	(Switzerland) Marco Chiudinelli	58	Win	3–6, 6–1, 6–1, 6–3
Australian Open; Melbourne, Australia; Grand Slam tournament Hard, outdoor January 18, 2010	3 / 353	3R	(Uzbekistan) Denis Istomin	103	Win	6–1, 6–1, 6–2
Australian Open; Melbourne, Australia; Grand Slam tournament Hard, outdoor January 18, 2010	4 / 354	4R	(Poland) Łukasz Kubot	86	Win	6–1, 6–2, 7–5
Australian Open; Melbourne, Australia; Grand Slam tournament Hard, outdoor January 18, 2010	5 / 355	QF	(France) Jo-Wilfried Tsonga	10	Loss	6–7^{(8–10)}, 7–6^{(7–5)}, 6–1, 3–6, 1–6
ABN AMRO World Tennis Tournament; Rotterdam, Netherlands; ATP 500; Hard, indoor February 8, 2010
ABN AMRO World Tennis Tournament; Rotterdam, Netherlands; ATP 500; Hard, indoor February 8, 2010	6 / 356	1R	(Ukraine) Sergiy Stakhovsky	69	Win	6–2, 4–1 Ret.
ABN AMRO World Tennis Tournament; Rotterdam, Netherlands; ATP 500; Hard, indoor February 8, 2010	7 / 357	2R	(Switzerland) Marco Chiudinelli	54	Win	6–4, 6–2
ABN AMRO World Tennis Tournament; Rotterdam, Netherlands; ATP 500; Hard, indoor February 8, 2010	–	QF	(Germany) Florian Mayer	63	Walkover	N/A
ABN AMRO World Tennis Tournament; Rotterdam, Netherlands; ATP 500; Hard, indoor February 8, 2010	8 / 358	SF	(Russia) Mikhail Youzhny	20	Loss	6–7^{(5–7)}, 6–7^{(6–8)}
Dubai Tennis Championships; Dubai, UAE; ATP 500; Hard, outdoor February 22, 2010
Dubai Tennis Championships; Dubai, UAE; ATP 500; Hard, outdoor February 22, 2010	9 / 359	1R	(Spain) Guillermo García López	47	Win	6–4, 6–4
Dubai Tennis Championships; Dubai, UAE; ATP 500; Hard, outdoor February 22, 2010	10 / 360	2R	(Serbia) Viktor Troicki	35	Win	3–6, 6–4, 6–2
Dubai Tennis Championships; Dubai, UAE; ATP 500; Hard, outdoor February 22, 2010	11 / 361	QF	(Croatia) Ivan Ljubičić	26	Win	2–6, 6–4, 6–0
Dubai Tennis Championships; Dubai, UAE; ATP 500; Hard, outdoor February 22, 2010	12 / 362	SF	(Cyprus) Marcos Baghdatis	37	Win	6–7^{(2–7)}, 6–3, 6–4
Dubai Tennis Championships; Dubai, UAE; ATP 500; Hard, outdoor February 22, 2010	13 / 363	W	(Russia) Mikhail Youzhny	15	Win (1)	7–5, 5–7, 6–3
Davis Cup World Group; 1st Round: Serbia vs USA; Belgrade, Serbia; Davis Cup; Clay, indoor March 5, 2010	14 / 364	1R; R2	(United States) Sam Querrey	22	Win	6–2, 7–6^{(7–4)}, 2–6, 6–3
Davis Cup World Group; 1st Round: Serbia vs USA; Belgrade, Serbia; Davis Cup; Clay, indoor March 5, 2010	15 / 365	1R; R4	(United States) John Isner	20	Win	7–5, 3–6, 6–3, 6–7^{(6–8)}, 6–4
BNP Paribas Open; Indian Wells, United States; ATP World Tour Masters 1000; Hard, outdoor March 11, 2010		1R	Bye			
BNP Paribas Open; Indian Wells, United States; ATP World Tour Masters 1000; Hard, outdoor March 11, 2010	16 / 366	2R	(United States) Mardy Fish	106	Win	6–1, 0–6, 6–2
BNP Paribas Open; Indian Wells, United States; ATP World Tour Masters 1000; Hard, outdoor March 11, 2010	17 / 367	3R	(Germany) Philipp Kohlschreiber	31	Win	6–3, 2–6, 7–6^{(7–3)}
BNP Paribas Open; Indian Wells, United States; ATP World Tour Masters 1000; Hard, outdoor March 11, 2010	18 / 368	4R	(Croatia) Ivan Ljubičić	26	Loss	5–7, 3–6
Sony Ericsson Open; Miami, United States; ATP World Tour Masters 1000; Hard, outdoor March 22, 2012		1R	Bye			
Sony Ericsson Open; Miami, United States; ATP World Tour Masters 1000; Hard, outdoor March 22, 2012	19 / 369	2R	(Belgium) Olivier Rochus	59	Loss	2–6, 7–6^{(9–7)}, 4–6
Monte-Carlo Rolex Masters; Monte Carlo, Monaco; ATP World Tour Masters 1000; Clay, outdoor April 11, 2010		1R	Bye			
Monte-Carlo Rolex Masters; Monte Carlo, Monaco; ATP World Tour Masters 1000; Clay, outdoor April 11, 2010	20 / 370	2R	(France) Florent Serra	67	Win	6–2, 6–3
Monte-Carlo Rolex Masters; Monte Carlo, Monaco; ATP World Tour Masters 1000; Clay, outdoor April 11, 2010	21 / 371	3R	(Switzerland) Stanislas Wawrinka	20	Win	6–4, 6–4
Monte-Carlo Rolex Masters; Monte Carlo, Monaco; ATP World Tour Masters 1000; Clay, outdoor April 11, 2010	22 / 372	QF	(Argentina) David Nalbandian	151	Win	6–2, 6–3
Monte-Carlo Rolex Masters; Monte Carlo, Monaco; ATP World Tour Masters 1000; Clay, outdoor April 11, 2010	23 / 373	SF	(Spain) Fernando Verdasco	12	Loss	2–6, 2–6
Internazionali BNL d'Italia; Rome, Italy; ATP World Tour Masters 1000; Clay, outdoor April 25, 2010		1R	Bye			
Internazionali BNL d'Italia; Rome, Italy; ATP World Tour Masters 1000; Clay, outdoor April 25, 2010	24 / 374	2R	(France) Jérémy Chardy	46	Win	6–1, 6–1
Internazionali BNL d'Italia; Rome, Italy; ATP World Tour Masters 1000; Clay, outdoor April 25, 2010	25 / 375	3R	(Brazil) Thomaz Bellucci	28	Win	6–4, 6–4
Internazionali BNL d'Italia; Rome, Italy; ATP World Tour Masters 1000; Clay, outdoor April 25, 2010	26 / 376	QF	(Spain) Fernando Verdasco	9	Loss	6–7^{(4–7)}, 6–3, 4–6
Serbia Open; Belgrade, Serbia; ATP World Tour 250; Clay, outdoor May 3, 2010
Serbia Open; Belgrade, Serbia; ATP World Tour 250; Clay, outdoor May 3, 2010		1R	Bye			
Serbia Open; Belgrade, Serbia; ATP World Tour 250; Clay, outdoor May 3, 2010	27 / 377	2R	(Italy) Fabio Fognini	80	Win	6–4, 6–4
Serbia Open; Belgrade, Serbia; ATP World Tour 250; Clay, outdoor May 3, 2010	28 / 378	QF	(Serbia) Filip Krajinović	319	Loss	4–6, Ret.
French Open; Paris, France; Grand Slam tournament Clay, outdoor May 24, 2010
French Open; Paris, France; Grand Slam tournament Clay, outdoor May 24, 2010	29 / 379	1R	(Kazakhstan) Evgeny Korolev	73	Win	6–1, 3–6, 6–1, 6–3
French Open; Paris, France; Grand Slam tournament Clay, outdoor May 24, 2010	30 / 380	2R	(Japan) Kei Nishikori	246	Win	6–1, 6–4, 6–4
French Open; Paris, France; Grand Slam tournament Clay, outdoor May 24, 2010	31 / 381	3R	(Romania) Victor Hănescu	37	Win	6–3, 3–6, 6–3, 6–2
French Open; Paris, France; Grand Slam tournament Clay, outdoor May 24, 2010	32 / 382	4R	(United States) Robby Ginepri	98	Win	6–4, 2–6, 6–1, 6–2
French Open; Paris, France; Grand Slam tournament Clay, outdoor May 24, 2010	33 / 383	QF	(Austria) Jürgen Melzer	27	Loss	6–3, 6–2, 2–6, 6–7^{(3–7)}, 4–6
Queens Club Championships; London, England; ATP World Tour 250; Grass, outdoor June 7, 2010
Queens Club Championships; London, England; ATP World Tour 250; Grass, outdoor June 7, 2010		1R	Bye			
Queens Club Championships; London, England; ATP World Tour 250; Grass, outdoor June 7, 2010	34 / 384	2R	(Italy) Paolo Lorenzi	96	Win	6–3, 6–3
Queens Club Championships; London, England; ATP World Tour 250; Grass, outdoor June 7, 2010	35 / 385	3R	(Belgium) Xavier Malisse	74	Loss	3–6, 6–4, 2–6
Wimbledon Championships; London, England; Grand Slam tournament Grass, outdoor June 21, 2010
Wimbledon Championships; London, England; Grand Slam tournament Grass, outdoor June 21, 2010	36 / 386	1R	(Belgium) Olivier Rochus	68	Win	4–6, 6–2, 3–6, 6–4, 6–2
Wimbledon Championships; London, England; Grand Slam tournament Grass, outdoor June 21, 2010	37 / 387	2R	(United States) Taylor Dent	97	Win	7–6^{(7–5)}, 6–1, 6–4
Wimbledon Championships; London, England; Grand Slam tournament Grass, outdoor June 21, 2010	38 / 388	3R	(Spain) Albert Montañés	31	Win	6–1, 6–4, 6–4
Wimbledon Championships; London, England; Grand Slam tournament Grass, outdoor June 21, 2010	39 / 389	4R	(Australia) Lleyton Hewitt	26	Win	7–5, 6–4, 3–6, 6–4
Wimbledon Championships; London, England; Grand Slam tournament Grass, outdoor June 21, 2010	40 / 390	QF	(Chinese Taipei) Lu Yen-hsun	82	Win	6–3, 6–2, 6–2
Wimbledon Championships; London, England; Grand Slam tournament Grass, outdoor June 21, 2010	41 / 391	SF	(Czech Republic) Tomáš Berdych	13	Loss	3–6, 6–7^{(9–11)}, 3–6
Davis Cup World Group; Quarterfinals: Croatia vs Serbia; Split, Croatia; Davis Cup; Hard, indoor July 9, 2010	42 / 392	QF; R1	(Croatia) Ivan Ljubičić	16	Win	7–6^{(7–3)}, 6–4, 6–1
Davis Cup World Group; Quarterfinals: Croatia vs Serbia; Split, Croatia; Davis Cup; Hard, indoor July 9, 2010	43 / 393	QF; R4	(Croatia) Marin Čilić	13	Win	6–3, 6–3, 6–2
Canadian Open; Toronto, Canada; ATP World Tour Masters 1000; Hard, outdoor August 7, 2010
Canadian Open; Toronto, Canada; ATP World Tour Masters 1000; Hard, outdoor August 7, 2010		1R	Bye			
Canadian Open; Toronto, Canada; ATP World Tour Masters 1000; Hard, outdoor August 7, 2010	44 / 394	2R	(France) Julien Benneteau	33	Win	7–5, 7–5
Canadian Open; Toronto, Canada; ATP World Tour Masters 1000; Hard, outdoor August 7, 2010	45 / 395	3R	(Romania) Victor Hănescu	54	Win	6–3, 6–4
Canadian Open; Toronto, Canada; ATP World Tour Masters 1000; Hard, outdoor August 7, 2010	46 / 396	QF	(France) Jérémy Chardy	72	Win	6–2, 6–3
Canadian Open; Toronto, Canada; ATP World Tour Masters 1000; Hard, outdoor August 7, 2010	47 / 397	SF	(Switzerland) Roger Federer	3	Loss	1–6, 6–3, 5–7
Cincinnati Masters; Cincinnati, USA; ATP World Tour Masters 1000; Hard, outdoor August 14, 2010
Cincinnati Masters; Cincinnati, USA; ATP World Tour Masters 1000; Hard, outdoor August 14, 2010		1R	Bye			
Cincinnati Masters; Cincinnati, USA; ATP World Tour Masters 1000; Hard, outdoor August 14, 2010	48 / 398	2R	(Serbia) Viktor Troicki	47	Win	6–3, 7–5
Cincinnati Masters; Cincinnati, USA; ATP World Tour Masters 1000; Hard, outdoor August 14, 2010	49 / 399	3R	(Argentina) David Nalbandian	37	Win	6–1, 7–6^{(9–7)}
Cincinnati Masters; Cincinnati, USA; ATP World Tour Masters 1000; Hard, outdoor August 14, 2010	50 / 400	QF	(United States) Andy Roddick	13	Loss	4–6, 5–7
US Open; New-York, USA; Grand Slam tournament Hard, outdoor August 30, 2010
US Open; New-York, USA; Grand Slam tournament Hard, outdoor August 30, 2010	51 / 401	1R	(Serbia) Viktor Troicki	47	Win	6–3, 3–6, 2–6, 7–5, 6–3
US Open; New-York, USA; Grand Slam tournament Hard, outdoor August 30, 2010	52 / 402	2R	(Switzerland) Marco Chiudinelli	52	Win	7–5, 6–3, 7–6^{(8–6)}
US Open; New-York, USA; Grand Slam tournament Hard, outdoor August 30, 2010	53 / 403	3R	(United States) James Blake	108	Win	6–1, 7–6^{(7–4)}, 6–3
US Open; New-York, USA; Grand Slam tournament Hard, outdoor August 30, 2010	54 / 404	4R	(United States) Mardy Fish	21	Win	6–3, 6–4, 6–1
US Open; New-York, USA; Grand Slam tournament Hard, outdoor August 30, 2010	55 / 405	QF	(France) Gaël Monfils	19	Win	7–6^{(7–2)}, 6–1, 6–2
US Open; New-York, USA; Grand Slam tournament Hard, outdoor August 30, 2010	56 / 406	SF	(Switzerland) Roger Federer	2	Win	5–7, 6–1, 5–7, 6–2, 7–5
US Open; New-York, USA; Grand Slam tournament Hard, outdoor August 30, 2010	57 / 407	F	(Spain) Rafael Nadal	1	Loss (1)	4–6, 7–5, 4–6, 2–6
Davis Cup World Group; Semifinals: Serbia vs Czech Republic; Belgrade, Serbia; Davis Cup; Hard, indoor September 17, 2010	58 / 408	SF; R4	(Czech Republic) Tomáš Berdych	7	Win	4–6, 6–3, 6–2, 6–4
China Open; Beijing, China; ATP 500; Hard, outdoor October 4, 2010
China Open; Beijing, China; ATP 500; Hard, outdoor October 4, 2010	59 / 409	1R	(China) Gong Maoxin	356	Win	6–1, 6–3
China Open; Beijing, China; ATP 500; Hard, outdoor October 4, 2010	–	2R	(United States) Mardy Fish	19	Walkover	N/A
China Open; Beijing, China; ATP 500; Hard, outdoor October 4, 2010	60 / 410	QF	(France) Gilles Simon	43	Win	6–3, 6–2
China Open; Beijing, China; ATP 500; Hard, outdoor October 4, 2010	61 / 411	SF	(United States) John Isner	22	Win	7–6^{(7–1)}, 6–2
China Open; Beijing, China; ATP 500; Hard, outdoor October 4, 2010	62 / 412	W	(Spain) David Ferrer	11	Win (2)	6–2, 6–4
Shanghai Masters; Shanghai, China; ATP World Tour Masters 1000; Hard, outdoor October 11, 2010
Shanghai Masters; Shanghai, China; ATP World Tour Masters 1000; Hard, outdoor October 11, 2010		1R	Bye			
Shanghai Masters; Shanghai, China; ATP World Tour Masters 1000; Hard, outdoor October 11, 2010	63 / 413	2R	(Croatia) Ivan Ljubičić	17	Win	6–3, 6–3
Shanghai Masters; Shanghai, China; ATP World Tour Masters 1000; Hard, outdoor October 11, 2010	64 / 414	3R	(France) Richard Gasquet	31	Win	6–1, 6–1
Shanghai Masters; Shanghai, China; ATP World Tour Masters 1000; Hard, outdoor October 11, 2010	65 / 415	QF	(Spain) Guillermo García López	35	Win	6–2, 6–3
Shanghai Masters; Shanghai, China; ATP World Tour Masters 1000; Hard, outdoor October 11, 2010	66 / 416	SF	(Switzerland) Roger Federer	3	Loss	5–7, 4–6
Swiss Indoors; Basel, Switzerland; ATP 500; Hard, indoor November 1, 2010
Swiss Indoors; Basel, Switzerland; ATP 500; Hard, indoor November 1, 2010	67 / 417	1R	(Latvia) Ernests Gulbis	26	Win	6–4, 6–2
Swiss Indoors; Basel, Switzerland; ATP 500; Hard, indoor November 1, 2010	68 / 418	2R	(Finland) Jarkko Nieminen	41	Win	6–4, 7–6^{(8–6)}
Swiss Indoors; Basel, Switzerland; ATP 500; Hard, indoor November 1, 2010	69 / 419	QF	(Netherlands) Robin Haase	66	Win	6–2, 6–3
Swiss Indoors; Basel, Switzerland; ATP 500; Hard, indoor November 1, 2010	70 / 420	SF	(Serbia) Viktor Troicki	32	Win	7–6^{(7–4)}, 6–4
Swiss Indoors; Basel, Switzerland; ATP 500; Hard, indoor November 1, 2010	71 / 421	F	(Switzerland) Roger Federer	2	Loss (2)	4–6, 6–3, 1–6
BNP Paribas Masters; Paris, France; ATP World Tour Masters 1000; Hard, indoor November 7, 2010		1R	Bye			
BNP Paribas Masters; Paris, France; ATP World Tour Masters 1000; Hard, indoor November 7, 2010	72 / 422	2R	(Argentina) Juan Mónaco	24	Win	6–4, 6–3
BNP Paribas Masters; Paris, France; ATP World Tour Masters 1000; Hard, indoor November 7, 2010	73 / 423	3R	(France) Michaël Llodra	34	Loss	6–7^{(6–8)}, 2–6
ATP World Tour Finals; London, England; Year-end Championships; Hard, indoor November 21, 2010
ATP World Tour Finals; London, England; Year-end Championships; Hard, indoor November 21, 2010	74 / 424	RR	(Czech Republic) Tomáš Berdych	6	Win	6–3, 6–3
ATP World Tour Finals; London, England; Year-end Championships; Hard, indoor November 21, 2010	75 / 425	RR	(Spain) Rafael Nadal	1	Loss	5–7, 2–6
ATP World Tour Finals; London, England; Year-end Championships; Hard, indoor November 21, 2010	76 / 426	RR	(United States) Andy Roddick	8	Win	6–2, 6–3
ATP World Tour Finals; London, England; Year-end Championships; Hard, indoor November 21, 2010	77 / 427	SF	(Switzerland) Roger Federer	2	Loss	1–6, 4–6
Davis Cup World Group; Final: Serbia vs France; Belgrade, Serbia; Davis Cup; Hard, indoor December 3, 2010	78 / 428	W R2	(France) Gilles Simon	42	Win	6–3, 6–1, 7–5
Davis Cup World Group; Final: Serbia vs France; Belgrade, Serbia; Davis Cup; Hard, indoor December 3, 2010	79 / 429	W R4	(France) Gaël Monfils	12	Win	6–2, 6–2, 6–4

- Source

=== Doubles matches ===
Tournament	Match	Round	Opponents (seed or key)	Ranks	Result	Score
Dubai Tennis Championships; Dubai, United Arab Emirates; ATP 500; Hard, outdoor 22–27 February 2010; Partner: (Serbia) Dušan Vemić
Dubai Tennis Championships; Dubai, United Arab Emirates; ATP 500; Hard, outdoor 22–27 February 2010; Partner: (Serbia) Dušan Vemić	1 / 55	1R	(Sweden) Simon Aspelin / (Australia) Paul Hanley	19 / 26	Loss	4–6, 3–6
Monte Carlo Rolex Masters; Monte Carlo, Monaco; ATP 1000; Clay, outdoor 12–18 April 2010; Partner: (Serbia) Viktor Troicki
Monte Carlo Rolex Masters; Monte Carlo, Monaco; ATP 1000; Clay, outdoor 12–18 April 2010; Partner: (Serbia) Viktor Troicki	2 / 56	1R	(Brazil) Thomaz Bellucci / (Spain) Albert Montañés	227 / 105	Win	6–1, 7–5
Monte Carlo Rolex Masters; Monte Carlo, Monaco; ATP 1000; Clay, outdoor 12–18 April 2010; Partner: (Serbia) Viktor Troicki	3 / 57	2R	(South Africa) Wesley Moodie / (Belgium) Dick Norman (4)	9 / 11	Loss	6–2, 4–6, [8–10]
Aegon Championships; London, United Kingdom; ATP 250; Grass, outdoor 7–13 June 2010; Partner: (Israel) Jonathan Erlich
Aegon Championships; London, United Kingdom; ATP 250; Grass, outdoor 7–13 June 2010; Partner: (Israel) Jonathan Erlich	4 / 58	1R	(United Kingdom) Jamie Delgado / (United Kingdom) Jonathan Marray (WC)	110 / 77	Win	7–5, 6–3
Aegon Championships; London, United Kingdom; ATP 250; Grass, outdoor 7–13 June 2010; Partner: (Israel) Jonathan Erlich	5 / 59	2R	(Brazil) Marcelo Melo / (Brazil) Bruno Soares (7)	30 / 32	Win	7–6^{(7–3)}, 4–6, [10–3]
Aegon Championships; London, United Kingdom; ATP 250; Grass, outdoor 7–13 June 2010; Partner: (Israel) Jonathan Erlich	6 / 60	QF	(South Africa) Wesley Moodie / (Belgium) Dick Norman (2)	15 / 16	Win	4–6, 7–6^{(8–6)}, [10–3]
Aegon Championships; London, United Kingdom; ATP 250; Grass, outdoor 7–13 June 2010; Partner: (Israel) Jonathan Erlich	7 / 61	SF	(France) Julien Benneteau / (France) Michaël Llodra (8)	28 / 33	Win	6–7^{(7–9)}, 6–3, [10–6]
Aegon Championships; London, United Kingdom; ATP 250; Grass, outdoor 7–13 June 2010; Partner: (Israel) Jonathan Erlich	8 / 62	W	(Slovakia) Karol Beck / (Czech Republic) David Škoch	154 / 80	Win (1)	6–7^{(6–8)}, 6–2, [10–3]
Rogers Cup; Toronto, Canada; ATP 1000; Hard, outdoor 9–15 August 2010; Partner: (Spain) Rafael Nadal
Rogers Cup; Toronto, Canada; ATP 1000; Hard, outdoor 9–15 August 2010; Partner: (Spain) Rafael Nadal	9 / 63	1R	(Canada) Vasek Pospisil / (Canada) Milos Raonic (WC)	178 / 492	Loss	7–5, 3–6, [8–10]
Davis Cup, World Group Semifinals; Belgrade, Serbia; Davis Cup; Hard, indoor 17–19 September 2010; Partner: (Serbia) Nenad Zimonjić
Davis Cup, World Group Semifinals; Belgrade, Serbia; Davis Cup; Hard, indoor 17–19 September 2010; Partner: (Serbia) Nenad Zimonjić	10 / 64	SF; R3	(Czech Republic) Tomáš Berdych / (Czech Republic) Radek Štěpánek	133 / 119	Loss	6–3, 1–6, 4–6, 1–6
Shanghai Rolex Masters; Beijing, China; ATP 1000; Hard, outdoor 11–17 October 2010; Partner: (Israel) Jonathan Erlich
Shanghai Rolex Masters; Beijing, China; ATP 1000; Hard, outdoor 11–17 October 2010; Partner: (Israel) Jonathan Erlich	11 / 65	1R	(France) Michaël Llodra / (France) Jo-Wilfried Tsonga	32 / 62	Win	6–3, 6–1
Shanghai Rolex Masters; Beijing, China; ATP 1000; Hard, outdoor 11–17 October 2010; Partner: (Israel) Jonathan Erlich	12 / 66	2R	(Canada) Daniel Nestor / (Serbia) Nenad Zimonjić (2)	3 / 3	Loss	6–7^{(4–7)}, 6–4, [5–10]

- Source

=== Exhibition matches ===
Tournament	Match	Round	Opponent (seed or key)	Rank	Result	Score
AAMI Classic; Melbourne, Australia Hard, outdoor 13–16 January 2010
AAMI Classic; Melbourne, Australia Hard, outdoor 13–16 January 2010	1	QF	(Germany) Tommy Haas (7)	18	Win	6–2, 6–3
AAMI Classic; Melbourne, Australia Hard, outdoor 13–16 January 2010	2	SF	(Spain) Fernando Verdasco (4)	9	Loss	1–6, 2–6
AAMI Classic; Melbourne, Australia Hard, outdoor 13–16 January 2010	–	SF-B	(Argentina) Juan Martín del Potro (2)	4	Walkover	N/A
AAMI Classic; Melbourne, Australia Hard, outdoor 13–16 January 2010	3	PO	(Australia) Bernard Tomic	291	Loss	4–6, 6–3, 5–7

== Tournament schedule ==
=== Singles schedule ===
Date	Tournament	City	Category	Surface	2009 result	2009 points	2010 points	Outcome
18.01.2010–31.01.2010	Australian Open	Melbourne	Grand Slam	Hard	QF	360	360	Quarterfinals (l. to Tsonga, 6–7^{(6–8)}, 7–6^{(7–5)}, 6–1, 3–6, 1–6)
08.02.2010–14.02.2010	ABN AMRO Tournament	Rotterdam	ATP World Tour 500	Hard (i)	DNS	0	180	Semifinals (lost to Mikhail Youzhny, 6–7^{(5–7)}, 6–7^{(6–8)})
22.02.2010–28.02.2010	Dubai Tennis Championships	Dubai	ATP World Tour 500	Hard	W	500	500	Winner (def. Mikhail Youzhny, 7–5, 5–7, 6–3)
05.03.2010–07.03.2010	Davis Cup: Serbia vs. United States	Belgrade	Davis Cup	Hard (i)	1R	0	80	First round: Serbia def. United States 3–2 (def. Sam Querrey, 6–2, 7–6^{(7–4)}, 2–6, 6–3) (def. John Isner, 7–5, 3–6, 6–3, 6–7^{(6–8)}, 6–4)
08.03.2010–21.03.2010	BNP Paribas Open	Indian Wells	ATP Masters 1000	Hard	QF	180	90	Fourth Round (lost to Ivan Ljubičić, 5–7, 3–6)
22.03.2010–04.04.2010	Sony Ericsson Open	Miami	ATP Masters 1000	Hard	F	600	10	Second Round (lost to Olivier Rochus, 2–6, 7–6^{(9–7)}, 4–6)
10.04.2010–18.04.2010	Monte-Carlo Rolex Masters	France	ATP Masters 1000	Clay	F	600	360	Semifinals (lost to Fernando Verdasco, 2–6, 2–6)
24.04.2010–02.05.2010	Internazionali BNL d'Italia	Rome	ATP Masters 1000	Clay	F	600	180	Quarterfinals (lost to Fernando Verdasco, 6–7^{(4–7)}, 6–3, 4–3)
03.05.2010–09.05.2010	Serbia Open	Belgrade	ATP World Tour 250	Clay	W	250	45	Quarterfinals (lost to Filip Krajinović, 4–6, Ret.)
07.05.2010–16.05.2010	Mutua Madrid Open	Madrid	ATP Masters 1000	Clay	SF	360	0	Withdrew
23.05.2010–06.06.2010	French Open	Paris	Grand Slam	Clay	3R	180	360	Quarterfinals (lost to J Melzer, 6–3, 6–2, 2–6, 6–7^{(3–7)}, 4–6)
06.07.2010–13.06.2010	Aegon Championships	London	ATP World Tour 250	Grass	DNS	0	20	Third Round (lost to Xavier Malisse, 3–6, 6–4, 2–6)
21.06.2010–04.07.2010	Wimbledon	London	Grand Slam	Grass	QF	360	720	Semifinals (lost to Tomáš Berdych, 3–6, 6–7^{(9–11)}, 3–6)
09.07.2010–11.07.2010	Davis Cup: Croatia vs. Serbia	Split	Davis Cup	Hard (i)	1R	0	130	Quarterfinals: Serbia def. Croatia 4–1 (def. Ivan Ljubičić, 7–6^{(7–3)}, 6–4, 6–1) (def. Marin Čilić, 6–3, 6–3, 6–2)
07.08.2010–15.08.2010	Rogers Cup	Toronto	ATP Masters 1000	Hard	QF	180	360	Semifinals (lost to Roger Federer, 1–6, 6–3, 5–7)
14.08.2010–22.08.2010	Western & Southern Open	Cincinnati	ATP Masters 1000	Hard	F	600	180	Quarterfinals (lost to Andy Roddick, 4–6, 5–7)
30.08.2010–13.09.2010	US Open	New York City	Grand Slam	Hard	SF	720	1200	Final (lost to Rafael Nadal 4–6, 7–5, 4–6, 2–6)
17.09.2010–19.09.2010	Davis Cup: Serbia vs. Czech	Belgrade	Davis Cup	Hard (i)	1R	0	70	Semifinals: Serbia def. (Czech Republic) Czech 3–2 (def. Tomáš Berdych, 4–6, 6–3, 6–2, 6–4)
01.10.2010–11.10.2010	China Open	Beijing	ATP World Tour 500	Hard	W	500	500	Winner (def. David Ferrer, 6–2, 6–4)
09.10.2010–17.10.2010	Shanghai Rolex Masters	Shanghai	ATP Masters 1000	Hard	SF	360	360	Semifinals (lost to Roger Federer, 5–7, 4–6)
01.11.2010–07.11.2010	Swiss Indoors	Basel	ATP World Tour 500	Hard (i)	W	500	300	Final (lost to Roger Federer 4–6, 6–3, 1–6)
06.11.2010–14.11.2010	BNP Paribas Masters	Paris	ATP Masters 1000	Hard (i)	W	1000	90	Third Round (lost to Michaël Llodra, 6–7^{(6–8)}, 2–6)
21.11.2010–28.11.2010	ATP World Tour Finals	London	ATP World Tour Finals	Hard (i)	RR	400	400	Semifinals (lost to Roger Federer, 1–6, 4–6)
03.12.2010–05.12.2010	Davis Cup: Serbia vs. France	Belgrade	Davis Cup	Hard (i)	1R	0	225	Winner: Serbia def. France 3–2 (def. Gilles Simon, 6–3, 6–1, 7–5) (def. Gaël Monfils, 6–2, 6–2, 6–4)
Total year-end points						8310	6240	▼2070 difference

NOTE: In 2010 season total year-end points from ABN AMRO Tournament and Aegon Championships were not counted, as well as those from First Round, Quarterfinals and Semifinals of Davis Cup.

=== Doubles schedule ===
Date	Tournament	City	Category	Surface	2009 result	2009 points	2010 points	Outcome
22.02.2010–28.02.2010	Dubai Tennis Championships	Dubai	ATP World Tour 500	Hard	DNS	0	(0)	First round (lost to Aspelin/Hanley, 4–6, 3–6)
10.04.2010–18.04.2010	Monte-Carlo Rolex Masters	Monte Carlo	ATP Masters 1000	Clay	SF	360	90	Second round (lost to Moodie/Norman, 6–2, 4–6, [8–10])
06.07.2010–13.06.2010	Aegon Championships	London	ATP World Tour 250	Grass	DNS	0	250	Winner (def. Beck/Škoch, 6–7^{(6–8)}, 6–2, [10–3])
07.08.2010–15.08.2010	Rogers Cup	Toronto	ATP Masters 1000	Hard	1R	(0)	(0)	First round (lost to Fyrstenberg/Matkowski, 7–5, 3–6, [8–10])
17.09.2010–19.09.2010	Davis Cup: Serbia vs. Czech	Belgrade	Davis Cup	Hard (i)	DNS	0	(0)	Semifinals: Serbia def. (Czech Republic) Czech 3–2 (lost to Berdych/Štěpánek, 6–3, 1–6, 4–6, 1–6)
09.10.2010–17.10.2010	Shanghai Rolex Masters	Shanghai	ATP Masters 1000	Hard	DNS	0	90	Second round (lost to Nestor/Zimonjić, 6–7^{(4–7)}, 6–4, [5–10])
Total year-end points						585	430	▼155 difference

== Yearly records ==
=== Head-to-head matchups ===
Novak Djokovic had a 4–8 record against the top 10, a 38–15 against the top 50 and a 23–3 against players outside the top 50.

Ordered by number of wins

=== Finals ===
==== Singles: 4 (2–2) ====
Category Grand Slam (0–1) ATP World Tour Finals (0–0) ATP World Tour Masters 1000 (0–0) ATP World Tour 500 (2–1) ATP World Tour 250 (0–0)	Titles by surface Hard (2–2) Clay (0–0) Grass (0–0)	Titles by conditions Outdoors (2–1) Indoors (0–1)

Outcome	No.	Date	Tournament	Surface	Opponent in the final	Score in the final
Winner	17.	February 28, 2010	Dubai Tennis Championships (2)	Hard	(Russia) Mikhail Youzhny	7–5, 5–7, 6–3
Runner-up	12.	September 13, 2010	US Open, New York City (2)	Hard	(Spain) Rafael Nadal	4–6, 7–5, 4–6, 2–6
Winner	18.	October 10, 2010	China Open, Beijing (2)	Hard	(Spain) David Ferrer	6–2, 6–4
Runner-up	13.	November 7, 2010	Davidoff Swiss Indoors, Basel	Hard (i)	(Switzerland) Roger Federer	4–6, 6–3, 1–6

==== Doubles: 1 (1–0) ====
Category Grand Slam (0–0) ATP World Tour Finals (0–0) ATP World Tour Masters 1000 (0–0) ATP World Tour 500 (0–0) ATP World Tour 250 (1–0)	Titles by surface Hard (0–0) Clay (0–0) Grass (1–0)	Titles by conditions Outdoors (1–0) Indoors (0–0)

Outcome	No.	Date	Tournament	Surface	Partners	Opponent in the final	Score in the final
Winner	1.	June 13, 2010	Aegon Championships, London	Grass	(Israel) Jonathan Erlich	(Slovakia) Karol Beck (Czech Republic) David Škoch	6–7^{(6–8)}, 6–2, [10–3]

==== Team competitions: 1 (1–0) ====
Outcome	No.	Date	Tournament	Surface	Partners	Opponent in the final	Score in the final
Winner	1.	December 3, 2010	Davis Cup Final, Belgrade	Hard (i)	(Serbia) Nenad Zimonjić (Serbia) Janko Tipsarević (Serbia) Viktor Troicki	(France) Gaël Monfils (France) Michaël Llodra (France) Arnaud Clément (France) Gilles Simon	3–2

=== Earnings ===
Novak Djokovic earned $4.3 million throughout the season.

=== Awards and nominations ===
- Best Male Tennis Player in Serbia
- DSL Sport Golden Badge
- Best Sportsman by OCS

== See also ==
- 2010 ATP World Tour
- 2010 Roger Federer tennis season
- 2010 Rafael Nadal tennis season
