= 2010 ATP World Tour Finals =

- Date: 21–28 November
- Edition: 41st (singles) / 36th (doubles)
- Category: World Tour Finals
- Draw: 8S / 8D
- Prize money: $5,070,000
- Surface: Hard / indoor
- Location: London, United Kingdom
- Venue: O_{2} arena

Champions

Singles
- (Switzerland) Roger Federer

Doubles
- (Canada) Daniel Nestor / (Serbia) Nenad Zimonjić
- ATP World Tour Finals

The 2010 ATP World Tour Finals (also known as the 2010 Barclays ATP World Tour Finals for sponsorship reasons) was held at the O_{2} Arena in London, United Kingdom between 21 and 28 November 2010. Nikolay Davydenko was the defending champion, but failed to qualify that year due to a wrist injury.

== Finals ==
=== Singles ===
(Switzerland) Roger Federer defeated (Spain) Rafael Nadal, 6–3, 3–6, 6–1

- It was Federer's 5th title of the year and 66th of his career. It was his 5th win at the event, winning in 2003, 2004, 2006, and 2007.

=== Doubles ===
(Canada) Daniel Nestor / (Serbia) Nenad Zimonjić defeated (India) Mahesh Bhupathi / (Belarus) Max Mirnyi, 7–6^{(8–6)}, 6–4

== Qualification ==
The top eight players (or teams) with the most countable points accumulated in Grand Slam, ATP World Tour and Davis Cup tournaments during the year qualify for the 2010 Barclays ATP World Tour Finals. Countable points include points earned in 2010, plus points earned at the 2009 Davis Cup final and the late-season 2009 Challengers played after the 2009 Barclays ATP World Tour Finals.

To qualify, a player who finished in the 2009 year-end Top 30 must compete in four Grand Slam tournaments and eight ATP World Tour Masters 1000 tournaments during 2010. In addition, his best 4 ATP World Tour 500 events in 2010 and his best 2 ATP World Tour 250 events in 2010 will count towards his ranking. All direct acceptance players at the time of an entry deadline who do not play an event will receive a 0-pointer for that event. The Monte Carlo Rolex Masters 1000 became optional in 2009, but if a player chooses to participate in it, its result will be counted and his 4th best result in an ATP 500 event will be ignored (his three best ATP 500 results remain). If a player doesn't play enough ATP 500 events, and does not have an ATP 250 or Challenger appearance with a better result, the Davis Cup is counted in the 500's table (if entered or achieved better results). If a player doesn't play enough ATP 250 or Challenger events, the World Team Championship is counted in the 250's table (if entered or achieved better results). If a player couldn't be present in all required tournament classes (i.e. because of an injury), all uncounted ATP 250 or Challenger results are eligible to be included in his 18 valid tournaments. In case of teams rankings challenger points are excluded. A player who is out of competition for 30 or more days, due to a verified injury, will not receive any penalty. The 2010 Barclays ATP World Tour Finals will count as an additional 19th tournament in the ranking of its eight qualifiers at season's end.

=== Battle for London: singles ===
#	Player	Points	Tour	Date Qualified
1	Rafael Nadal (ESP)	11,450	16	7 June
2	Roger Federer (SUI)	7,645	17	30 August
3	Novak Djokovic (SRB)	5,635	18	9 October
4	Robin Söderling (SWE)	5,380	22	23 October
5	Andy Murray (GBR)	5,360	18	14 October
6	Tomáš Berdych (CZE)	3,755	25	11 November
7	David Ferrer (ESP)	3,735	23	11 November
8	Andy Roddick (USA)	3,665	17	11 November

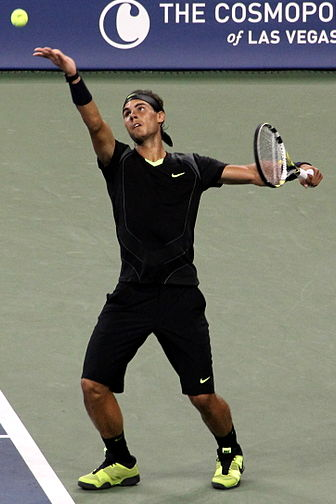
Rafael Nadal won his Career Golden Slam at the 2010 US Open

On 7 June, after winning his fifth French Open title, Spaniard Rafael Nadal was announced as the first qualifier.

Rafael Nadal won 7 titles in the year, the most of any player on the tour. Nadal began the year by reaching the final of the Qatar ExxonMobil Open losing to Nikolay Davydenko 0–6, 7–6(8), 6–4. At the Australian Open he lost in the quarterfinals to Andy Murray. Nadal won his first title of the year and his first in 11 months at the Monte-Carlo Rolex Masters where he defeated Fernando Verdasco in the final with a 6–0, 6–1 victory. This was his sixth consecutive title at the event. He then went on to win his next 3 tournaments, racking up 24 consecutive match wins on the way. He won the Internazionali BNL d'Italia, his fifth in the event, defeating compatriot David Ferrer 7–5, 6–2 in the final. Nadal also claimed his home masters tournament, Mutua Madrileña Madrid Open, for the first time, avenging his 2009 final defeat, to Roger Federer with a 6–4, 7–6(5) win. Nadal then reclaimed the French Open, winning it for the fifth time and avenging his loss to Robin Söderling in last year's 4th round encounter with a 6–4, 6–2, 6–4 victory in the final, with this he also reclaimed the world no. 1 ranking from Roger Federer. Thus making a sweep of the clay-court Masters 1000 and Slam. Nadal's winning streak was ended by compatriot Feliciano López at the quarterfinals of the Aegon Championships losing 7–6(5), 6–4. Nadal's next title came at Wimbledon, where he defeated Tomáš Berdych 6–3, 7–5, 6–4 in the final to claim his second title and his first Old World Triple. Nadal then went on to complete a Career Golden Slam and claim the year-end no. 1 ranking; with his first win at the US Open over Novak Djokovic 6–4, 5–7, 6–4, 6–2 in a rain-delayed final. Nadal also earned his 7th title of the year at the Rakuten Japan Open Tennis Championships beating Gaël Monfils 6–1, 7–5. Nadal missed the last Masters of the event in the BNP Paribas Masters due to a shoulder injury. This was his fourth appearance, having reached the semifinals twice with a 4–7 record. Nadal was looking to improve on last year where he failed to win a set in the tournament.

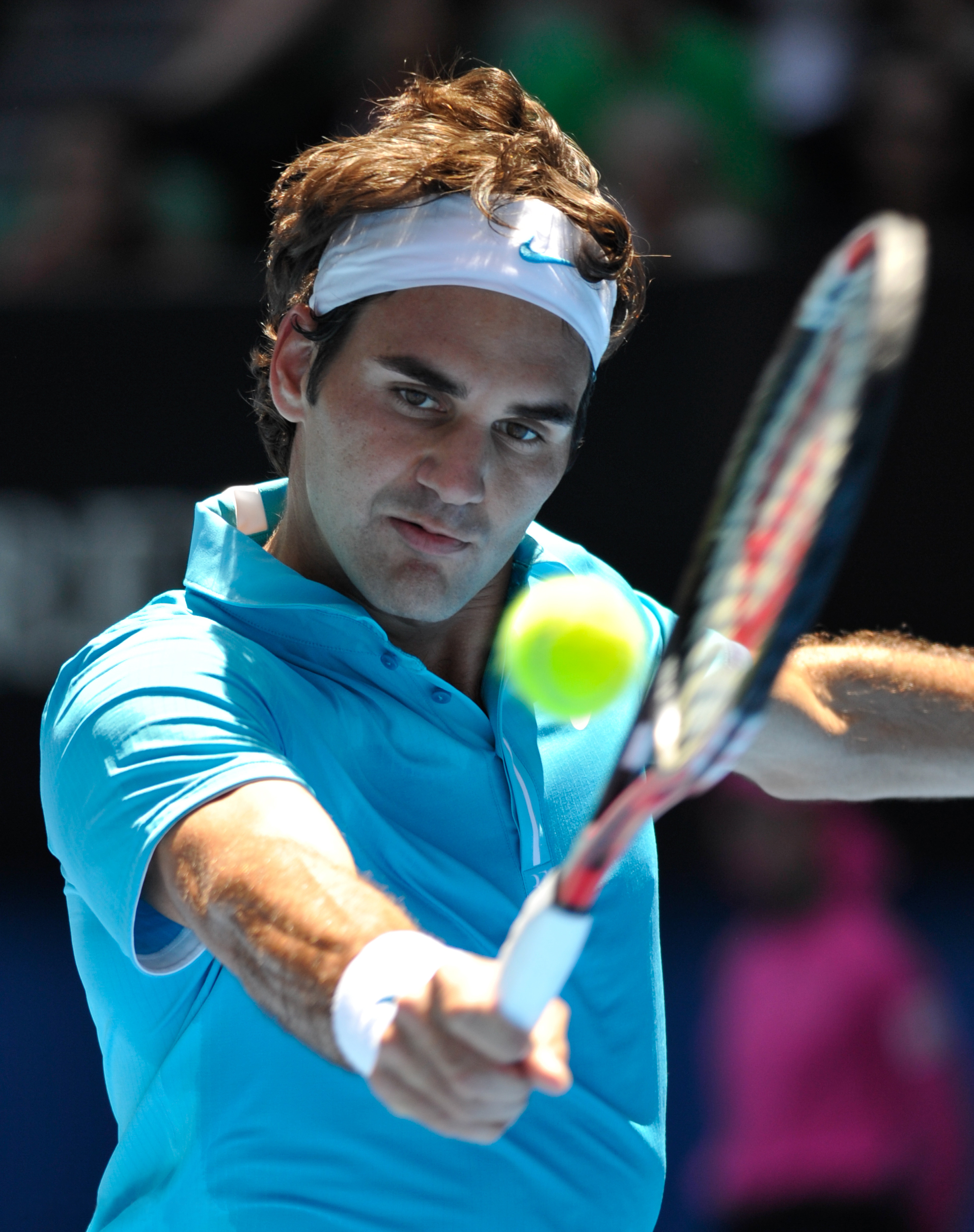
Roger Federer won the 2010 Australian Open, which was his fourth victory at the Slam

On 30 August following his victory over Brian Dabul in the first round of the US Open, Roger Federer was announced as the second qualifier.

Roger Federer began the year by winning the Australian Open, his 16th Slam title defeating Andy Murray 6–3, 6–4, 7–6(11) in the final. Federer did not reach another final until the Mutua Madrileña Madrid Open, where he was the defending champion but lost in a rematch of the 2009 final to Rafael Nadal 6–4, 7–6(5). He also fell in his next two finals, at the Gerry Weber Open and the Rogers Cup losing to Lleyton Hewitt 3–6, 7–6(4), 6–4 (ending his 15 match winning streak over the Australian) and Andy Murray 7–5, 7–5. Federer then defended his title in the Western & Southern Financial Group Masters, defeating American Mardy Fish 6–7(5), 7–6(1), 6–4. He then reached his fourth Masters 1000 final in the Shanghai Rolex Masters but lost to Andy Murray 3–6, 2–6. Federer won his third title of the year at the If Stockholm Open defeating Florian Mayer in the final 6–4, 6–3. Equaling Pete Sampras for the number of tournament wins with 64. Federer then broke Sampras' total as he won his 65th career title in the Davidoff Swiss Indoors, outlasting Novak Djokovic 6–4, 3–6, 6–1 in the final. This title places him fourth in the all-time list. Federer reached the semifinals of the US Open and as the defending champion, he fell in the quarterfinals to eventual finalist in the Wimbledon and French Open Novak Djokovic. During the French Open, Federer won his 700th ATP tour level match and his 150th on clay. While at Wimbledon, Federer recorded his 200th Grand Slam match win in the first round. Federer reached his 900th tour match in Stockholm and duly won it. Federer has a 29–7 record in the World Tour Finals, having won it on 4 occasions in 2003, 2004, 2006 and 2007. This is his ninth appearance in the event, and he made the semifinals last year.

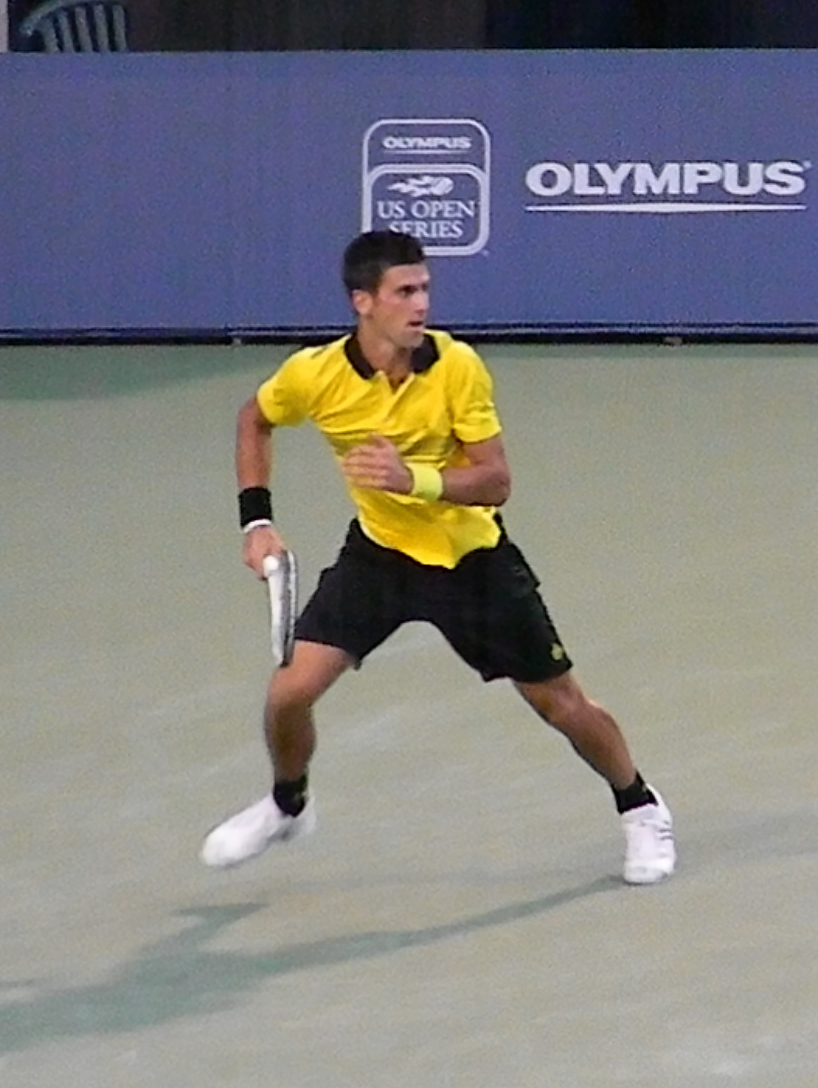
Novak Djokovic reached his second US Open final

On 9 October after reaching the semi-finals of the Shanghai Masters, Serbian Novak Djokovic became the third qualifier.

Novak Djokovic reached a career-high world no. 2 after the Australian Open. Djokovic successfully defended a title for the first time at the Barclays Dubai Tennis Championships defeating Mikhail Youzhny 7–5, 5–7, 6–3. The Serb struggled first with his serve and then with his health, during the clay and grass season. But after moving back on to hardcourts Djokovic reached his first Grand Slam final since winning the 2008 Australian Open at the US Open. Djokovic defeated Roger Federer in the semifinal ending a run of three consecutive losses at the Open to him. Djokovic beat the Swiss 5–7, 6–1, 5–7, 6–2, 7–5, saving two match points at 5–4 down on his serve in the final set. In the final Djokovic lost to Rafael Nadal in four sets 6–4, 5–7, 6–4, 6–2. Djokovic went on to win his second title of the year in the China Open defeating David Ferrer 6–2, 6–4 in the final. At the Davidoff Swiss Indoors as the defending champion, he reached the final but lost to Roger Federer 4–6, 6–3, 1–6. At the other Slams, the Serbian was able to reach the quarterfinals of both the Australian Open and French Open, and the semi-finals of the Wimbledon Championships. He was a member of the Serbia's Davis Cup team where he won all of his five singles matches taking Serbia to their first Davis Cup final. Djokovic is making his fourth appearance after winning in 2008, and is looking to improve on last year's performance, where he failed to get out of his group.

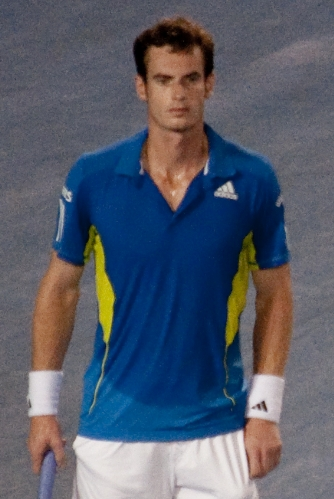
Andy Murray reaches the Australian Open final

On 13 October after reaching the third round of the Shanghai Rolex Masters, Britain's no. 1 Andy Murray was announced as a qualifier.

Andy Murray began the year by reaching his second Slam final at the Australian Open, where he defeated Rafael Nadal in the quarterfinals after the Spaniard retired, but lost to Roger Federer in the final 6–3, 6–4, 7–6(11). After the loss to Federer, Murray went on a bad run of form only making it in 2 quarterfinals in 8 tournaments. However, Murray bounced back at the Wimbledon Championships, where he reached the semi-finals losing to Rafael Nadal 6–4, 7–6(6), 6–4. The Scot then reached the final on his next tournament at the Farmers Classic, but was defeated by American Sam Querrey 5–7, 7–6(2), 6–3 in the final. Murray won his first title of the year at the Rogers Cup where he was the defending champion, defeating Roger Federer 7–5, 7–5 in the final. Murray also defeated Roger Federer 6–3, 6–2 in the final to win his second title in the year at the Shanghai Rolex Masters, he also did not drop a set in the tournament. At the other Slams, Andy fell early in both French Open and US Open, in the fourth and third round, respectively. This is his third appearance and has a 5–2 record, and he has a best of the semi-finals in 2008. Murray will be looking to do better than last year where he failed to make it out of the groups by one game.

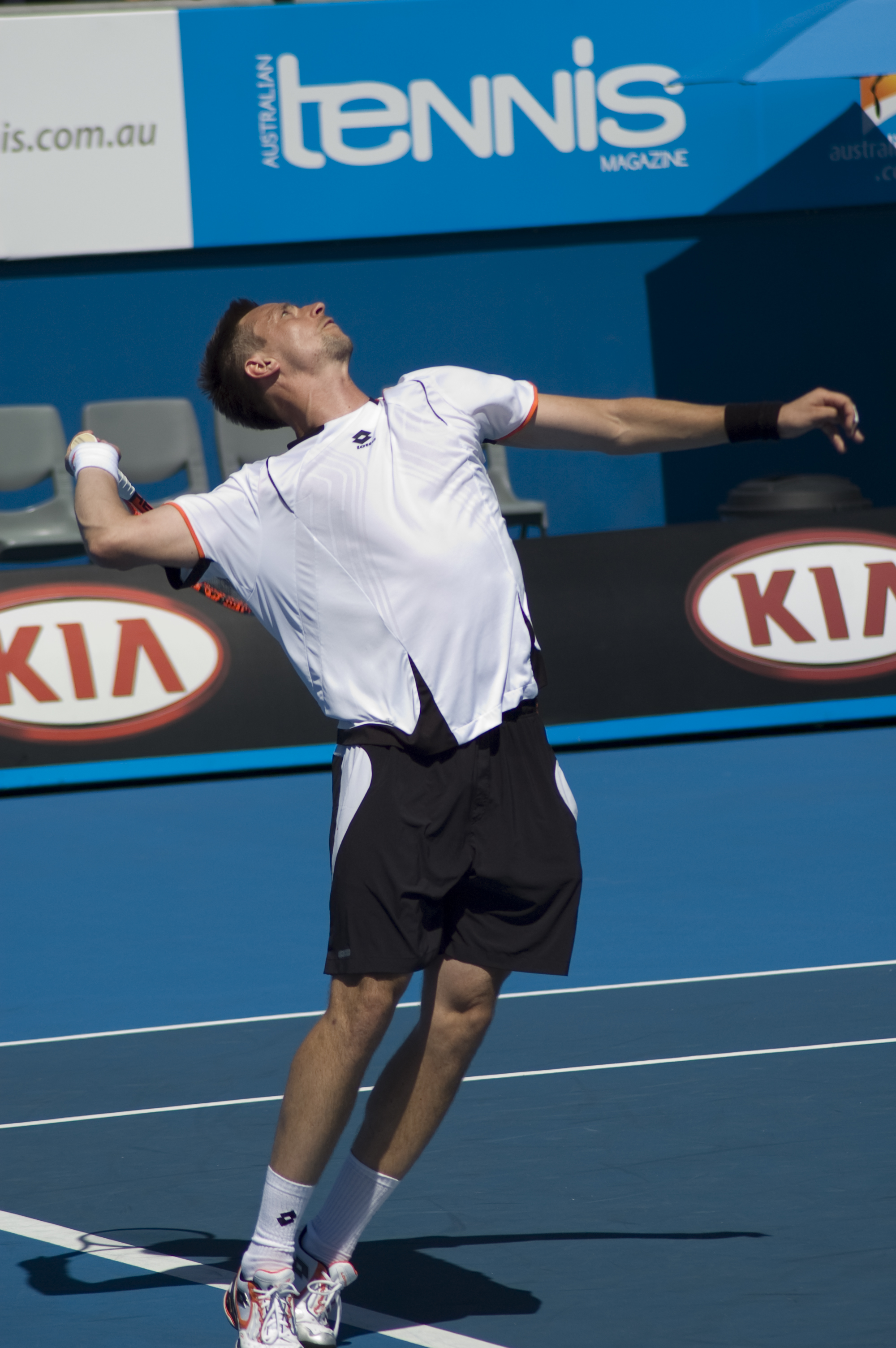
Robin Söderling qualified for the second straight year

On 23 October after reaching the quarterfinals of the If Stockholm Open, French Open finalist Robin Söderling was named as the fifth qualifier.

Robin Söderling won his first 500 Series title in the ABN AMRO World Tennis Tournament won over Mikhail Youzhny when the Swede leading 6–4, 2–0, the Russian retired due to a right hamstring injury. He then reached the final of the Barcelona Open Banco Sabadell losing to Fernando Verdasco in the final 6–3, 4–6, 6–3. At the French Open, Söderling made a repeat of last years upset, but this time around against Roger Federer defeating him in the quarterfinals 3–6, 6–3, 7–5, 6–4, ending Federer's 12 match winning streak over the Swede. He then went on to reach the finals for the second consecutive year, but lost to Rafael Nadal 6–4, 6–2, 6–4. He reached his fourth final of the year at the SkiStar Swedish Open, as the defending champion but lost to Nicolás Almagro 5–7, 6–3, 2–6 in the final. At the other Slams, he reached the quarterfinals of the Wimbledon Championships and the US Open, and the first round of the Australian Open. He also reached the semi-finals of BNP Paribas Open, Sony Ericsson Open and the Valencia Open 500. In mid-November he has won the BNP Paribas Masters against Gaël Monfils by 6–1, 7–6 plummeting his ranking to career-high of world no. 4 and also in seeding of the tournament where this will be his second appearance making it to the semifinals last year.

On 11 November the final three remaining spots were taken after Spaniard Fernando Verdasco lost 6–7 7–6 7–5 in the third round to Gaël Monfils.

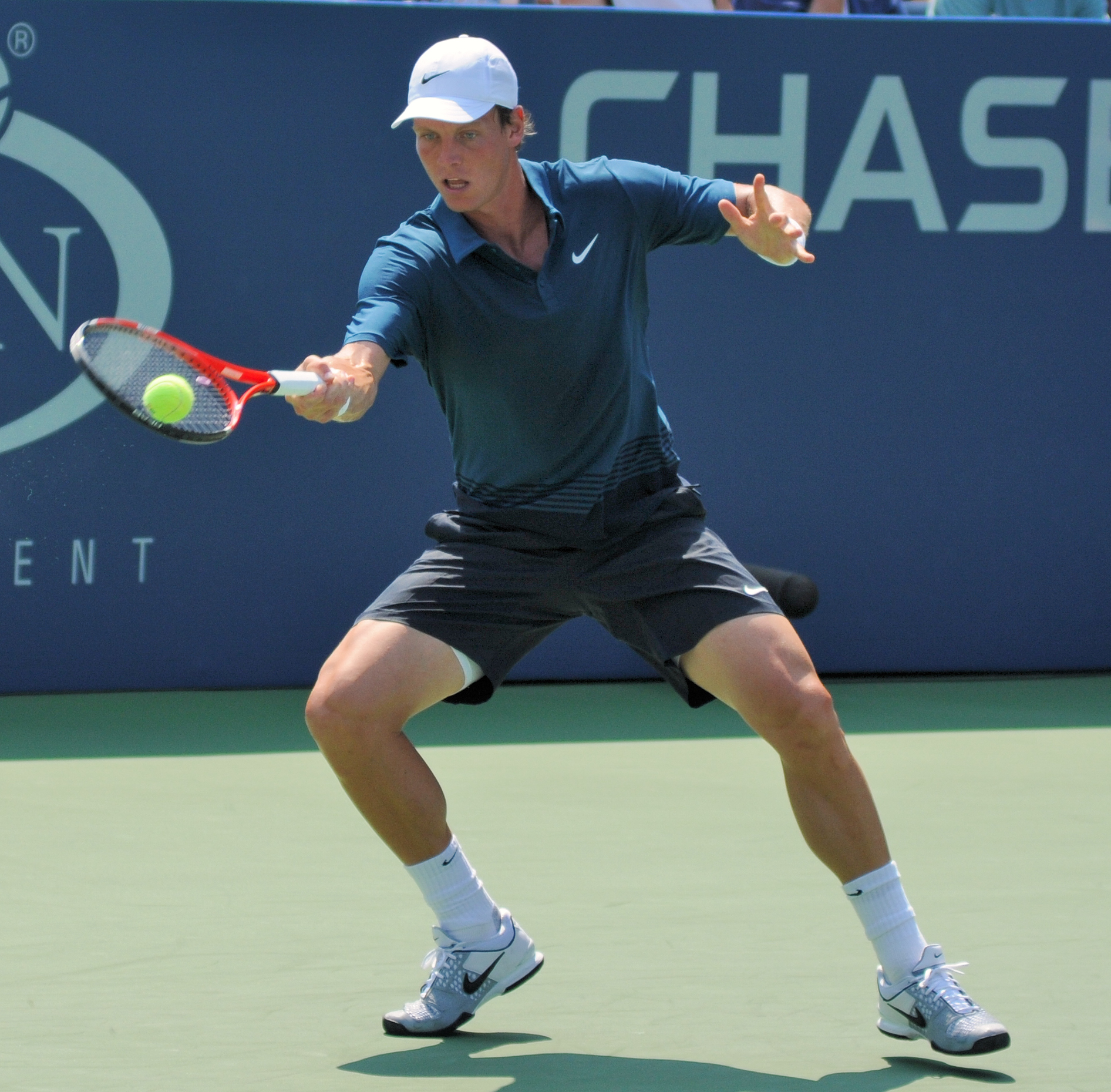
Tomáš Berdych reaches his first Grand Slam final at Wimbledon

Tomáš Berdych made a big triumph this year by reaching a career-high no. 6 in the world. Although Berdych is the only player on the eight-man field to not win a tournament in the year, he made a big impression in the Slams. Berdych was able to make it to his first Grand Slam Semi-finals at the French Open losing to Robin Söderling after earning a victory over Andy Murray in the round of 16. Berdych, however made a bigger impression at the Wimbledon Championships, where he upset world no. 2 Roger Federer 6–4, 3–6, 6–1, 6–4 in the quarterfinals and world no. 3 Novak Djokovic 6–3, 7–6(9), 6–3 in the semi-finals, to reach his first Slam final where he fell to world no. 1 Rafael Nadal 6–3, 7–5, 6–4. Berdych was only able to reach one other final at the Sony Ericsson Open where he lost to American Andy Roddick 7–5, 6–4 in the final. At the other slams Berdych fell early at the first round of the US Open and the second round of the Australian Open. Berdych is also the only debutant in the tournament.

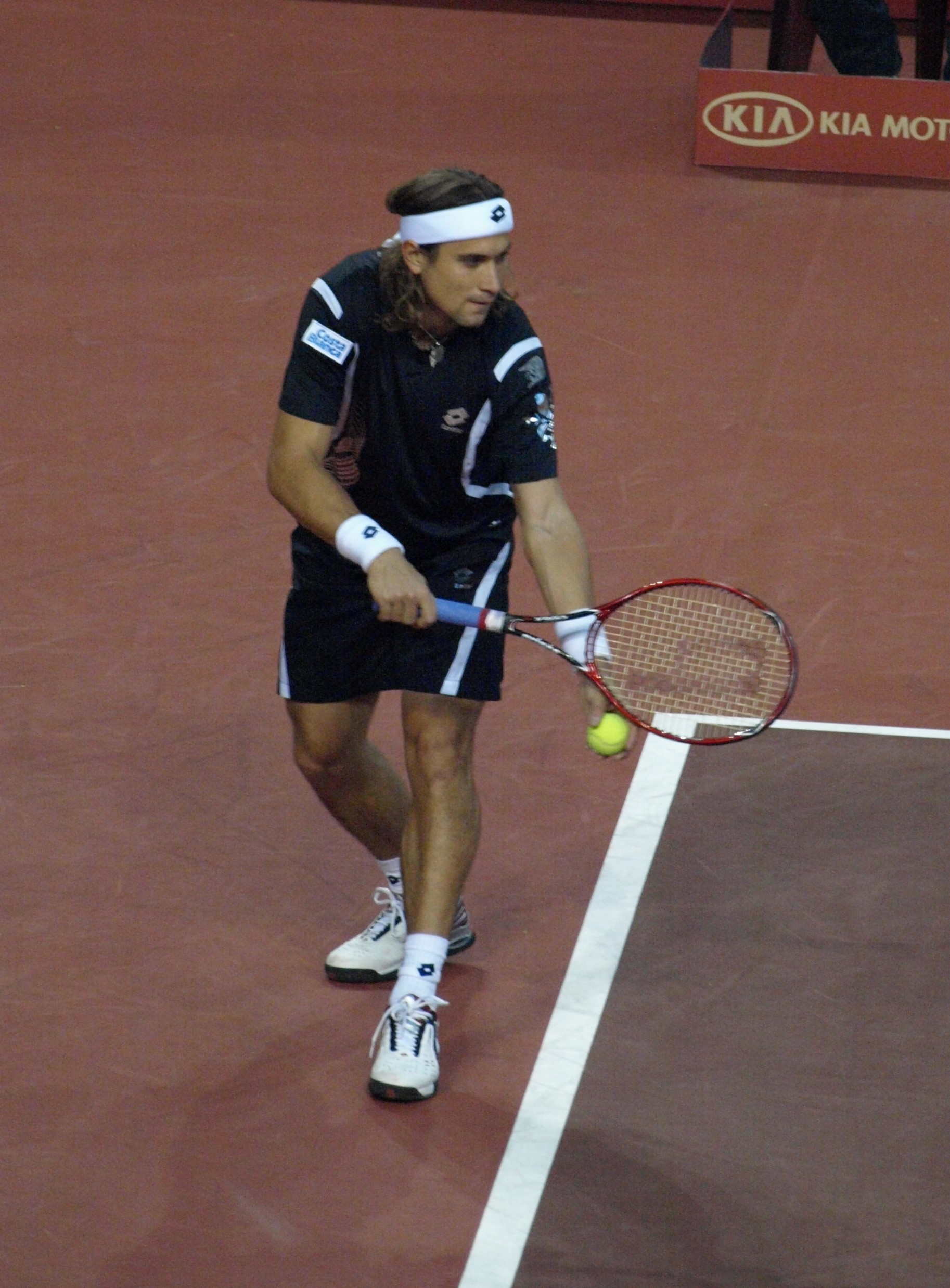
David Ferrer qualifies for the second time

David Ferrer made a resurgence this year getting back into the top 10 after 2 years. Ferrer was able to win two titles this year, both at 500 series events. His first is in the Abierto Mexicano Telcel where he defeated compatriot Juan Carlos Ferrero 6–3, 3–6, 6–1 in the final and in the Valencia Open 500 defeated surprise finalist Lucky loser Marcel Granollers 7–5, 6–3 in the final. Ferrer also made it to his first Masters 1000 finals at the Internazionali BNL d'Italia losing to defending champion Rafael Nadal 7–5, 6–2 in the final. Ferrer was also able to reach two other finals in the Copa Telmex losing to Juan Carlos Ferrero 5–7, 6–4, 6–3 in the final and in the China Open, this time losing to top seed Novak Djokovic 6–4, 6–2 in the final. Ferrer was also able to reach the semi-finals of Monte-Carlo Rolex Masters, Barcelona Open Banco Sabadell and Mutua Madrileña Madrid Open. In the Slams Ferrer was able to reach the fourth round of the Wimbledon Championships and US Open, the third round of the French Open and the second round of the Australian Open. Ferrer is making his second appearance, having reached the final in 2007 losing to Roger Federer 6–2, 6–3, 6–2.

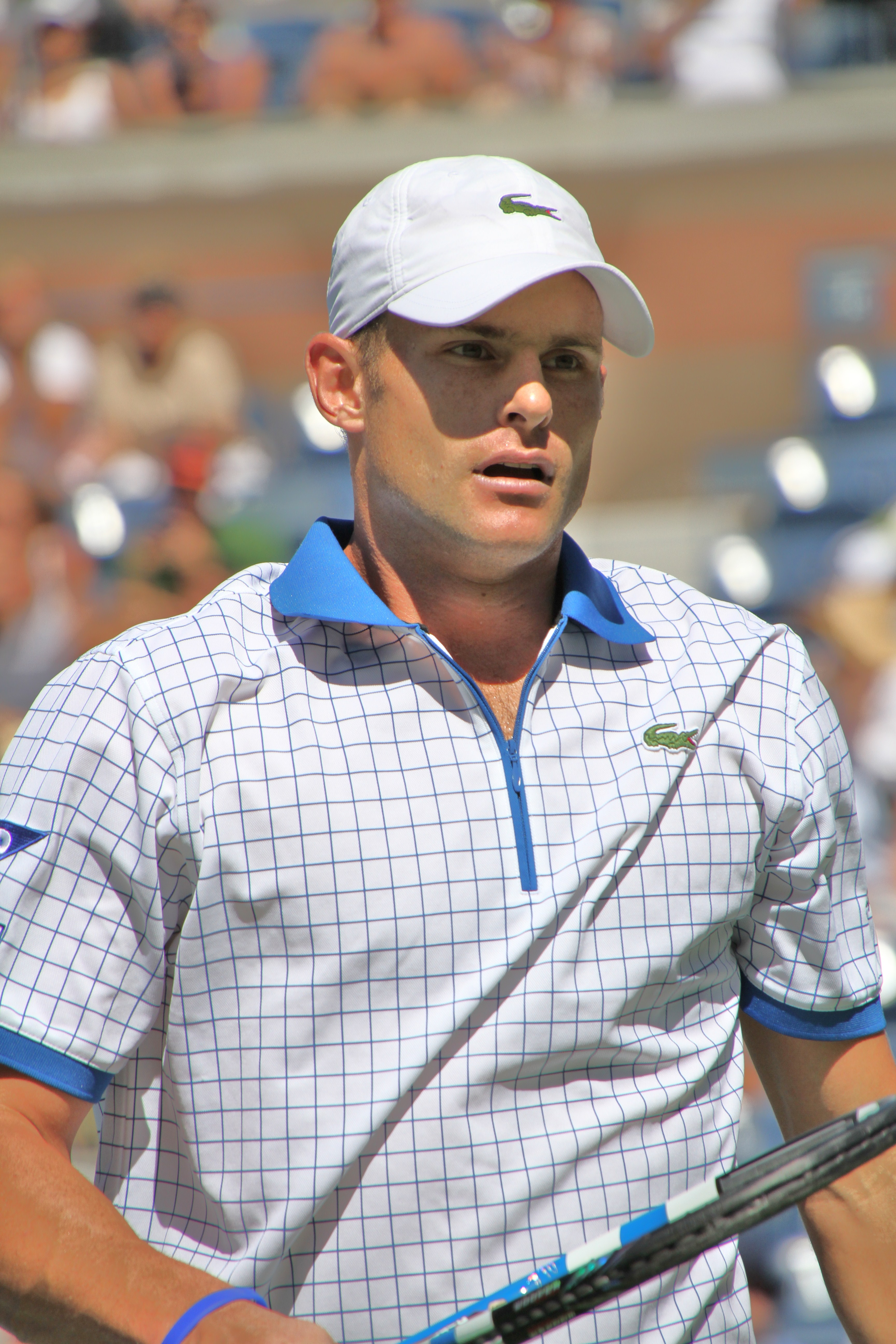
Andy Roddick winning in Miami

Andy Roddick began the year in perfect form by winning the Brisbane International defeating Radek Štěpánek 7–6(2), 7–6(7) in the final. This made 2010 his tenth consecutive season with at least one ATP singles title. He then reached the final of the SAP Open in San Jose but fell to 2nd seed Fernando Verdasco 3–6, 6–4, 6–4. He then reached the final of the BNP Paribas Open, his first Masters final since winning in the 2006 Western & Southern Financial Group Masters but fell to Croatian Ivan Ljubičić 7–6(3), 7–6(5). However, at the Sony Ericsson, Roddick made a triumph as he upset Rafael Nadal in the semifinals 3–6, 6–4, 6–4 and eventually won the title over Tomáš Berdych 7–5, 6–4 in the final, this is his fifth Masters 1000 title. Roddick also missed the whole European Clay Season. At the Slams Roddick wasn't able to go deep in the draw as he fell in the second round of the US Open, the third round of the French Open and the fourth round Wimbledon Championships and the quarterfinals of the Australian Open. Roddick qualified for the 8th straight year but is only making his 6th appearance after reaching the semi-finals in 2003, 2004 and 2007.

=== Battle for London: doubles ===
Rk	Player	Points	Tour	Date Qualified
1	Bob Bryan (USA); Mike Bryan (USA)	11,370	23	30 August
2	Daniel Nestor (CAN); Nenad Zimonjić (SRB)	8,370	24	30 August
3	Mahesh Bhupathi (IND); Max Mirnyi (BLR)	4,270	18	11 November
4	Lukáš Dlouhý (CZE); Leander Paes (IND)	4,015	18	23 October
5	Łukasz Kubot (POL); Oliver Marach (AUT)	3,735	23	10 November
6	Mariusz Fyrstenberg (POL); Marcin Matkowski (POL)	3,520	28	11 November
7	Wesley Moodie (RSA); Dick Norman (BEL)	3,375	20	13 November
12	Jürgen Melzer (AUT); Philipp Petzschner (GER)	2,745	12	14 September
Melzer and Petzschner qualified due to winning Wimbledon and a top 20 finish according to the rules (P39)

On 30 August, The first two team to qualify were announced. The two teams were defending champions and twin brothers Bob and Mike Bryan and 2008 champions Daniel Nestor of Canada and Nenad Zimonjić of Serbia.

Bob Bryan and Mike Bryan started the year by defending their Australian Open defeating Nestor/Zimonjić 6–3, 6–7, 6–3. They also defended their next two titles in the Delray Beach International Tennis Championships and US Men's Clay Court Championships over the teams of Marx/Zelenay 6–3, 7–6 and Huss/Moodie 6–3, 7–5, respectively. They also won back-to-back Masters 1000 titles in the 2010 Internazionali BNL d'Italia defeating compatriots Isner/Querrey and in the Mutua Madrileña Madrid Open over Nestor/Zimonjic. They then made a good run at the US Open Series winning in the Farmers Classic over Zimonjic/Nestor in a close three setter 6–7, 6–2, [10–7]. They then won their next three tournaments at the Rogers Cup 7–5, 6–3 over Benneteau/Llodra, Western & Southern Financial Group Masters 6–3, 6–4 over Bhupathi/Mirnyi and the last Slam of the year, the US Open defeating the Asian team of Bopanna/Qureshi 7–6, 7–6. They then won their 10th and 11th title at the China Open defeating Fyrstenberg/Matkowski 6–1, 7–6 and at the Davidoff Swiss Indoors once again defeating Zimonjić/Nestor 6–3, 3–6, [10–3].

Daniel Nestor and Nenad Zimonjić began the year by winning the Medibank International Sydney defeating Hutchins/Kerr 6–3, 7–6. They also won in the ABN AMRO World Tennis Tournament outlasting Aspelin/Hanley 6–4, 4–6, [10–7]. They had a good run at the European clay season winning three titles, the Monte-Carlo Rolex Masters defeating Bhupathi/Mirnyi 6–3, 2–0 retired, the Barcelona Open Banco Sabadell defeating Hewitt/Knowles 4–6, 6–3, [10–6] and the French Open defeating Dlouhý/Paes 7–5, 6–2. They won their sixth title of the year at the Bank Austria-TennisTrophy over the Polish team of Fyrstenberg/Matkowski 7–5, 3–6, [10–5]. They reached the finals of the BNP Paribas Open falling to the Spanish team of López/Nadal 7–6, 6–3. They also reached the finals of the Australian Open, Mutua Madrileña Madrid Open and Davidoff Swiss Indoors all losing to the team of Bryan/Bryan in all three occasions. They have announced that this is their final tournament together.

On 14 September, Wimbledon Champions Jürgen Melzer and Philipp Petzschner were announced as the third qualifiers after the team of Rohan Bopanna and Aisam-ul-Haq Qureshi failed to win the US Open.

Jürgen Melzer and Philipp Petzschner played together for the first time this year. Together they won two titles, the PBZ Zagreb Indoors over Clément/Rochus 3–6, 6–3, [10–8] and the Wimbledon Championships over Lindstedt/Tecău 6–1, 7–5, 7–5. This is the first Slam for both Melzer and Petzschner. Petzschner also reached the finals of MercedesCup with Christopher Kas but lost to the Argentinian team of Berlocq/Schwank in two tie-breaks. Melzer on the other hand reached two finals, winning in the Shanghai Rolex Masters with Leander Paes defeating Fyrstenberg/Matkowski 7–5, 4–6, [10–5] and losing in the PTT Thailand Open with Jonathan Erlich losing to Kas/Troicki 6–4, 6–4.

On 23 October the team of Lukáš Dlouhý and Leander Paes were announced as the fourth qualifiers.

Lukáš Dlouhý and Leander Paes only won one title in the year the Sony Ericsson Open, where they defeated Bhupathi/Mirnyi in the final 6–2, 7–5. They also reached four other finals but fell in each, at the Brisbane International to French Team of Chardy/Gicquel 6–3, 7–6, at the Barclays Dubai Tennis Championships to Aspelin/Hanley 6–2, 6–3, at the French Open as the defending champions to Nestor/Zimonjić 7–5, 6–2 and at the UNICEF Open to Lindstedt/Tecau 1–6, 7–5, [10–7]

On 10 November, Łukasz Kubot and Oliver Marach became the fifth team to qualify.

Łukasz Kubot and Oliver Marach won two titles this year, both coming on clay where they defeated Starace at the Movistar Open over Starace/Zeballos 6–4, 6–0 and at the Abierto Mexicano Telcel over Fognini/Starace 6–0, 6–0. They also reached the finals of the Brasil Open losing to Cuevas/Granollers 7–5, 6–4. Marach also won a title in the BMW Open with Santiago Ventura over Butorac/Kohlmann 5–7, 6–3, [16–14]. Kubot also won a title with Juan Ignacio Chela at the BCR Open Romania defeating Granollers/Ventura 6–2, 5–7, [13–11].

On 11 November the Polish team Mariusz Fyrstenberg and Marcin Matkowski and the team of Mahesh Bhupathi and Max Mirnyi were announced as qualifiers.

Mariusz Fyrstenberg and Marcin Matkowski both entered the top 10 of doubles and has won at least one title as a team for the eight straight year when they won the Aegon International over the British team of Fleming/Skupski 6–3, 5–7, [10–8]. They also had a good run after the US Open as they reached four finals but lost in each at the Proton Malaysian Open to Čermák/Mertiňák 7–6, 7–6, at the China Open to Bryan/Bryan 6–1, 7–6, at the Shanghai Rolex Masters to Melzer/Paes 7–5, 4–6, [10–5] and at the Bank Austria-TennisTrophy to Nestor/Zimonjić 7–5, 3–6, [10–5].

Mahesh Bhupathi and Max Mirnyi reached four Masters 1000 event finals in the year fell in their first three but succeeded in winning the final one. At the Sony Ericsson Open they lost to Dlouhý/Paes 6–2, 7–5, at the Monte-Carlo Rolex Masters to Nestor/Zimonjić 6–3, 2–0 retired, and at the Western & Southern Financial Group Masters to Bryan/Bryan 6–3, 6–4. At the BNP Paribas Masters they won their only title of the year, 7–5, 7–5 against Ram/Knowles. They also reached the final of the Valencia Open 500, where they fell to British brothers Murray/Murray 7–6, 5–7, [10–7].

On 13 November, Wesley Moodie and Dick Norman took the last spot after František Čermák and Michal Mertiňák were defeated by Mahesh Bhupathi and Max Mirnyi.

Wesley Moodie and Dick Norman did not reach a final this year. Even though Moodies reached the final of the US Men's Clay Court Championships with Stephen Huss losing to Bryan/Bryan 6–3, 7–5. Their best performance came in the French Open and Wimbledon Championships where they fell in the semi-finals.

== Contenders points breakdown ==
=== Singles ===
Rank	Athlete	Grand Slam				ATP World Tour Masters 1000								ATP 500				ATP 250		Total points	Tours
Rank	Athlete	AO	FO	W	USO	IW	MI	MA	RO	CA	CI	SH	PA	1	2	3	4	5	6	Total points	Tours
1	(Spain) Rafael Nadal*	QF; 360	W 2000	W 2000	W 2000	SF; 360	SF; 360	W 1000	W 1000	SF; 360	QF; 180	R16; 90	A 0	W 1000	W 500	- 0	- 0	F 150	SF; 90	11,450	16
2	(Switzerland) Roger Federer*	W 2000	QF; 360	QF; 360	SF; 720	R32; 45	R16; 90	F 600	R32; 10	F 600	W 1000	F 600	SF; 360	W 500	- 0	- 0	- 0	W 250	F 150	7,645	17
3	(Serbia) Novak Djokovic*	QF; 360	QF; 360	SF; 720	F 1200	R16; 90	R64; 10	A 0	QF; 180	SF; 360	QF; 180	SF; 360	R16; 90	W 500	W 500	SF; 360	F 300	QF; 45	R16; 20	5,635	18
4	(Sweden) Robin Söderling*	R128; 10	F 1200	QF; 360	QF; 360	SF; 360	SF; 360	R32; 10	R16; 90	R16; 90	R16; 90	QF; 180	W 1000	W 500	F 300	SF; 180	QF; 90	F 150	DC; 50	5,380	22
5	(United Kingdom) Andy Murray*	F 1200	R16; 180	SF; 720	R32; 90	QF; 180	R64; 10	QF; 180	R16; 90	W 1000	QF; 180	W 1000	QF; 180	QF; 90	R16; 45	R16; 45	R32; 0	F 150	R16; 20	5,360	18
6	(Czech Republic) Tomáš Berdych*	R64; 45	SF; 720	F 1200	R128; 10	QF; 180	F 600	A 0	R32; 45	QF; 180	R16; 90	R16; 90	R16; 90	QF; 90	QF; 90	R16; 90	DC; 40	RR; 105	SF; 90	3,755	22
7	(Spain) David Ferrer*	R64; 45	R32; 90	R16; 180	R16; 180	R64; 10	R16; 90	SF; 360	F 600	R64; 10	R16; 90	R16; 90	R16; 90	W 500	W 500	SF; 360	F 300	F 150	SF; 90	3,735	23
8	(United States) Andy Roddick*	QF; 360	R32; 90	R16; 180	R64; 45	F 600	W 1000	A 0	A 0	A 0	SF; 360	R32; 45	QF; 180	SF; 180	QF; 90	QF; 90	R16; 45	W 250	F 150	3,665	17

=== Doubles ===
Rank	Team	Points																		Total Points	Tourn
Rank	Team	1	2	3	4	5	6	7	8	9	10	11	12	13	14	15	16	17	18	Total Points	Tourn
1	Bob Bryan (USA); Mike Bryan (USA)	W 2000	W 2000	W 1000	W 1000	W 1000	W 1000	W 500	W 500	QF; 360	SF; 360	SF; 360	W 250	W 250	W 250	QF; 180	QF; 180	QF; 90	QF; 90	11,370	22
2	Daniel Nestor (CAN); Nenad Zimonjić (SRB)	W 2000	F 1200	W 1000	F 600	F 600	W 500	W 500	F 300	W 250	W 250	QF; 180	QF; 180	QF; 180	R16; 180	SF; 180	R16; 90	R32; 90	SF; 90	8,370	18
3	Mahesh Bhupathi (IND); Max Mirnyi (BLR)	W 1000	F 600	F 600	F 600	F 300	SF; 360	R16; 180	QF; 180	SF; 90	QF; 90	R32; 90	R32; 90	QF; 45	QF; 45	R64; 0	R32; 0	R16; 0	R16; 0	4,270	19
4	Lukáš Dlouhý (CZE); Leander Paes (IND)	F 1200	W 1000	QF; 360	SF; 360	F 300	QF; 180	QF; 180	F 150	F 150	R32; 90	F 75	QF; 45	R32; 0	R16; 0	R16; 0	R16; 0	R16; 0	R64; 0	4,015	18
5	Łukasz Kubot (POL); Oliver Marach (AUT)	W 500	SF; 360	SF; 360	SF; 360	QF; 360	QF; 360	W 250	SF; 180	QF; 180	QF; 180	QF; 180	R16; 180	F 150	SF; 90	QF; 45	R16; 0	R16; 0	R16; 0	3,735	25
6	Mariusz Fyrstenberg (POL); Marcin Matkowski (POL)	F 600	SF; 360	QF; 360	QF; 360	F 300	W 250	SF; 180	QF; 180	QF; 180	F 150	F 150	QF; 90	R16; 90	R32; 90	R32; 90	QF; 45	QF; 45	R16; 0	3,520	28
7	Wesley Moodie (RSA); Dick Norman (BEL)	SF; 720	SF; 720	SF; 360	SF; 360	QF; 360	QF; 180	SF; 90	SF; 90	SF; 90	SF; 90	QF; 90	QF; 90	QF; 45	QF; 45	QF; 45	R16; 0	R16; 0	R16; 0	3,375	25
12	Jürgen Melzer (AUT); Philipp Petzschner (GER)	W 2000	W 250	QF; 180	R16; 180	SF; 90	QF; 45	R16; 0	R32; 0	R64; 0	R64; 0	R16; 0	R16; 0							2,745	12

== Groupings ==
The tournament was conducted in a round robin format. The eight players/teams divided in two groups. The eight seeds were determined by the South African Airways ATP rankings and the 2010 ATP Doubles Team Rankings of Monday, 15 November 2010. The top seed was placed in Group A and the second seed placed in Group B. Players/teams seeded three and four, five and six, seven and eight, were then drawn in pairs placing the first drawn in Group A.

=== Singles ===
Group A Consists of three of four of the Slam champions competing in the event. The group is led by 9-time Major champion Rafael Nadal, and former Australian Open champion, Novak Djokovic and former US Open winner, Andy Roddick. The group is completed by Wimbledon finalist Tomáš Berdych. Against the rest of the group, no. 1 seed Rafael Nadal is 28–13, no. 3 seed Novak Djokovic is 12–21, no. 6 seed Tomáš Berdych is 6–17 and no. 8 seed Andy Roddick is 14–9.

Nadal is 15–7 with Djokovic, with their only match this year, coming at the US Open final, which was won by Nadal, however Djokovic won 3 of their last 4 encounters. Nadal also leads 8–3 over Berdych, and has won both their encounters this year. Nadal also leads Roddick 5–3, but with Roddick winning their last meeting, but Nadal has won 3 of the last 4. Roddick on the other hand has a winning record against both Djokovic and Berdych. Roddick is 5–2 against Djokovic and is on a four match winning streak against the Serb with their last meeting coming in Cincinnati. Roddick also leads Berdych 6–2 and has a four match winning streak against the Czech. The pair have played three times this year but haven't met since Miami. While Djokovic trails Nadal and Roddick he has a winning record of 3–1 against Berdych, winning their previous encounter at the Davis Cup semi-final tie between Serbia and Czech Republic.

Group B is led by the only Major champion in his group Roger Federer, he is joined two-time Major finalists Robin Söderling and Andy Murray, the group is completed by David Ferrer. Against the rest of the group, no. 2 seed Roger Federer has an impressive 29–9, no. 4 seed Robin Söderling 11–20, no. 5 seed Andy Murray 11–10 and no. 7 David Ferrer 7–19.

Andy Murray leads 8–5 against Federer, they have met three in finals this year with Murray winning their last two meeting at Shanghai and Toronto. Murray is tied with Söderling 2–2, with Söderling winning their last match in Indian Wells. However Murray trails 1–3 to Ferrer, with Ferrer winning their two encounters in 2010 in Rome and Madrid. Federer has lost only one match to the others, he is 14–1 with Söderling's only win at Roland Garros this year and a perfect record of 10–0 versus Ferrer. Söderling has a winning record against Ferrer of 8–4, however Ferrer won their last match in Valencia.

=== Doubles ===
Group A: Against the rest of the group the Bryans who hold two Grand Slam title of the season have a promising advantage over the others with 15–6, while Roland Garros finalist Dlouhý/Paes are 4–6 while Fyrstenberg/Matkowski are at 7–12 and the Wimbledon champions Melzer/Petzschner are 0–2.

The Bryans were 4–1 up against Dlouhý/Paes without having a match this year (but winning the last one at the 2009 ATP World Tour Finals), tied at 10–5 with Fyrstenberg/Matkowski (3–2 in 2010 including the China Open final in favor of Bryans) and 1–0 against Melzer/Petzschner in their only meeting in the Australian Open. Fyrstenberg/Matkowski are tied with Dlouhý/Paes 2–2 (the Czech-Indian team has come up from 0–2 of last year) and never faced Melzer/Petzschner. Melzer/Petzschner are 0–1 down with Dlouhý/Paes losing in Brisbane in the first ATP tournament of the year.

Group B: 2010 French Open champion and Australian Open finalist Nestor/Zimonjić were joined by Bhupathi/Mirnyi, Kubot/Marach and Moodie/Norman. Against the rest of the group Nestor/Zimonjić are 7–2, whilst Bhupathi/Mirnyi are 3–2. Kubot/Marach are 3–6 and Moodie/Norman are 1–4.

Nestor/Zimonjic are tied 1–1 with Bhupathi/Mirnyi with the latters retiring in the Monte-Carlo Masters final and turning the odds in the BNP Paribas Masters Quarters by winning the decider set. They are 3–1 against Kubot/Marach setting off the standstill after beating them in both of their encounters this year. They are strong versus Moodie/Norman with 3–0 head-to-head consolidating it by coming out victoriously in both of their semifinal matches (Monte Carlo, French Open). Bhupathi and Mirnyi has never played Moodie/Norman but are 2–1 against Kubot/Marach. All three matches took place in 2010 as follows : Cincinnati Masters Semis win in August, Shanghai Masters Fail in the quarterfinal and Valencia 500 Semis win in October. The Pole-Austrian duo are tied with Moodie/Norman 1–1 (Valencia and Monte-Carlo Masters respectively).

== Head-to-heads ==
These are the head-to-head records as they approach the tournament.

=== Singles ===
		Nadal	Federer	Djokovic	Söderling	Murray	Berdych	Ferrer	Roddick	Overall
1	(Spain) Rafael Nadal		14–7	15–7	5–2	8–4	8–3	11–3	5–3	66–29
2	(Switzerland) Roger Federer	7–14		12–6	14–1	5–8	9–3	10–0	20–2	77–34
3	(Serbia) Novak Djokovic	7–15	6–12		5–1	4–3	3–1	5–4	2–5	32–41
4	(Sweden) Robin Söderling	2–5	1–14	1–5		2–2	6–3	8–4	3–2	23–35
5	(United Kingdom) Andy Murray	4–8	8–5	3–4	2–2		1–2	1–3	6–3	25–27
6	(Czech Republic) Tomáš Berdych	3–8	3–9	1–3	3–6	2–1		2–5	2–6	16–38
7	(Spain) David Ferrer	3–11	0–10	4–5	4–8	3–1	5–2		4–3	23–40
8	(United States) Andy Roddick	3–5	2–20	5–2	2–3	3–6	6–2	3–4		24–42

=== Doubles ===
		Bryan; Bryan	Nestor; Zimonjić	Bhupathi; Mirnyi	Dlouhý; Paes	Kubot; Marach	Fyrstenberg; Matkowski	Moodie; Norman	Melzer; Petzschner	Overall
1	(United States) Bob Bryan / (United States) Mike Bryan		6–8	3–4	4–1	6–0	10–5	4–2	1–0	34–20
2	(Canada) Daniel Nestor / (Serbia) Nenad Zimonjić	8–6		1–1	7–1	3–1	7–5	3–0	0–0	29–14
3	(India) Mahesh Bhupathi / (Belarus) Max Mirnyi	4–3	1–1		0–1	2–1	3–0	0–0	1–0	11–6
4	(Czech Republic) Lukáš Dlouhý / (India) Leander Paes	1–4	1–7	1–0		0–2	2–2	2–0	1–0	8–15
5	(Poland) Łukasz Kubot / (Austria) Oliver Marach	0–6	1–3	1–2	2–0		1–3	1–1	0–0	6–15
6	(Poland) Mariusz Fyrstenberg / (Poland) Marcin Matkowski	5–10	5–7	0–3	2–2	3–1		0–1	0–0	15–24
7	(South Africa) Wesley Moodie / (Belgium) Dick Norman	2–4	0–3	0–0	0–2	1–1	1–0		1–1	5–11
8	(Austria) Jürgen Melzer / (Germany) Philipp Petzschner	0–1	0–0	0–1	0–1	0–0	0–0	1–1		1–4

== Day-by-day summaries ==
=== Day 1 : 21 November 2010 ===
The tournament started with doubles action from Group A. In the opening match the defending champions the Bryan brothers won in straight sets over debutants Melzer/Petzschner.

In the following singles match, 2008 semifinalist Murray fought 2009 semifinalist Robin Söderling. The two had switched places in the ATP World rankings 6 days earlier, after Sodeling won the Paris Masters overtaking Murray by 20 points. Murray broke three times in the first set winning it 6–2. In the second set, Söderling was more competitive as he only lost serve once allowing Murray to close out a straight sets win in only 80 minutes.

Polish duo Fyrstenberg/Matkowski faced Dlouhý/Paes in the third match. They won 6–3, 7–6 and closed second just one game behind the Bryans after the opening round of group A.

The last match of the day was between the 2007 finalists Federer and Ferrer. Federer raced into a 4–0 lead after only 15 minutes. In the fifth game Ferrer retrieved a break, to record his first game. However Federer then won the next two games to close the set out, 6–1. The second set was closer with chances to break for both players. In the end it was Federer who got a break and after saving three break points when serving for the match the Swiss star closed the match out with a 6–1, 6–4 win. This was Federer's 30th win at the season ending championships. Federer at the end of the first round of matches leads the group on game difference as he is one game ahead of Murray.

Matches on O_{2} arena
Group	Winner	Loser	Score
Doubles – Group A	(United States) Bob Bryan (United States) Mike Bryan [1]	(Austria) Jürgen Melzer (Germany) Philipp Petzschner [7]	6–3, 7–5
Singles – Group B	(United Kingdom) Andy Murray [5]	(Sweden) Robin Söderling [4]	6–2, 6–4
Doubles – Group A	(Poland) Mariusz Fyrstenberg (Poland) Marcin Matkowski [6]	(Czech Republic) Lukáš Dlouhý (India) Leander Paes [3]	6–3, 7–6(3)
Singles – Group B	(Switzerland) Roger Federer [2]	(Spain) David Ferrer [7]	6–1, 6–4
1st match started at 12:15 pm, 2nd not before 2 pm, 3rd at 6:15 pm and 4th not before 8 pm

=== Day 2 : 22 November 2010 ===
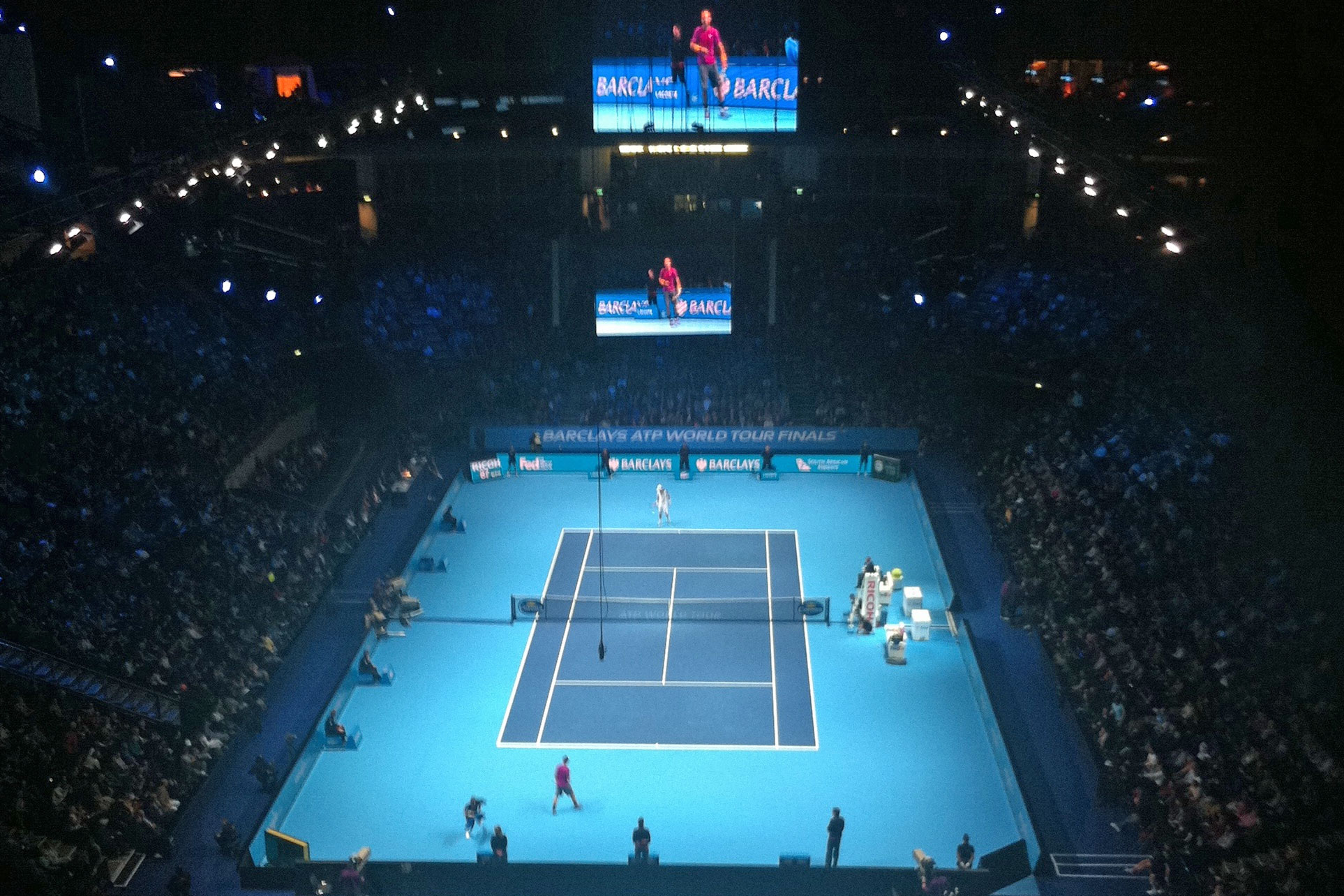
Rafael Nadal against Andy Roddick in the 2010 ATP World Tour Finals

The first match of the Group B for doubles had the ranked No. 4 Mahesh Bhupathi and Max Mirnyi against Polish Łukasz Kubot and Austrian Oliver Marach. The first set went to tiebreak, and this was won by Bhupathi and Mirnyi 7–6. The second was won by them as they broke serve for a 6–4 second set scoreline. With this victory and the result of the other match they lie second in the group.

The first match of the Group A for singles was between Serbian Novak Djokovic and Czech Tomáš Berdych. Djokovic (who won the ATP World Tour Finals in 2008) broke at the start and at the end of the first set for a 6–3 win. Djokovic then broke Berdych just once in the second set but it was enough for a 6–3, 6–3 win. As a result of the other match in Group A, the Serbian sits on top of the group.

In the third match of the day Daniel Nestor and Nenad Zimonjić played against Wesley Moodie and Dick Norman and won losing just 3 games: 6–2, 6–1.

In the last match, Rafael Nadal and Andy Roddick squared off. The American started brightly winning the first set 6–3. The pair traded breaks early in the second before the set was decided in Nadal's favour on a tiebreaker, 7–6. The third set looked to be heading towards a tie breaker before Nadal broke to win the set 6–4 and the match.

Matches on O_{2} arena
Group	Winner	Loser	Score
Doubles – Group B	(India) Mahesh Bhupathi (Belarus) Max Mirnyi [4]	(Poland) Łukasz Kubot (Austria) Oliver Marach [5]	7–6(2), 6–4
Singles – Group A	(Serbia) Novak Djokovic [3]	(Czech Republic) Tomáš Berdych [6]	6–3, 6–3
Doubles – Group B	(Canada) Daniel Nestor (Serbia) Nenad Zimonjić [2]	(South Africa) Wesley Moodie (Belgium) Dick Norman [8]	6–2, 6–1
Singles – Group A	(Spain) Rafael Nadal [1]	(United States) Andy Roddick [8]	3–6, 7–6(5), 6–4
1st match started at 12:15 pm, 2nd not before 2 pm, 3rd at 6:15 pm and 4th not before 8 pm

=== Day 3 : 23 November 2010 ===
In the first match of Day 3, Jürgen Melzer and Philipp Petzschner defeated Lukáš Dlouhý and Leander Paes in three sets, winning the deciding one 10–8.

Roger Federer then scored an easy win over Andy Murray.

The third match of the day saw a surprise, as Mariusz Fyrstenberg and Marcin Matkowski defeated the Bryans in three sets, with the deciding set also finishing at 10–8.

Day 3 ended with Robin Söderling defeating David Ferrer 7–5, 7–5, all but eliminating Ferrer from semifinal contention.

Matches on O_{2} arena
Group	Winner	Loser	Score
Doubles – Group A	(Austria) Jürgen Melzer (Germany) Philipp Petzschner [7]	(Czech Republic) Lukáš Dlouhý (India) Leander Paes [3]	7–6(9), 4–6, [10–8]
Singles – Group B	(Switzerland) Roger Federer [2]	(United Kingdom) Andy Murray [5]	6–4, 6–2
Doubles – Group A	(Poland) Mariusz Fyrstenberg (Poland) Marcin Matkowski [6]	(United States) Bob Bryan (United States) Mike Bryan [1]	2–6, 7–6(4), [10–8]
Singles – Group B	(Sweden) Robin Söderling [4]	(Spain) David Ferrer [7]	7–5, 7–5
1st match started at 12:15 pm, 2nd not before 2 pm, 3rd at 6:15 pm and 4th not before 8 pm

=== Day 4 : 24 November 2010 ===
The lowest ranked doubles couple of the tournament, composed by Wesley Moodie and Dick Norman, were the winners of the first match between Łukasz Kubot and Oliver Marach losing only four games: 6–1, 6–3.

After this Tomáš Berdych redeemed himself from his lost match with Djokovic and defeated Andy Roddick in two sets, and made Roddick hard to qualify to the semifinals.

Canadian Daniel Nestor and Serbian Nenad Zimonjić defeated Mahesh Bhupathi and Max Mirnyi with a double tiebreak: 7–5 the first, and 7–1 the second and last one.

The last match of the day featured a rematch of the US Open final between Rafael Nadal and Novak Djokovic. Djokovic had break point in the opening Nadal service game, which was saved. But three two Nadal had broken through. Djokovic though broke back immediately and held to make it four all. Djokovic then started to have an issue with a contact lens, and at four all took an extended break to try to resolve the problem. After a five-minute absence Djokovic returned to court and held serve, Nadal made it five all before gaining the all-important break. Nadal then fended off several break points to clinch the set by seven games to five. Djokovic was then allowed to extend the break between the sets to sort the issue out with his contact lens' once again. Nadal seemed irritated that the Serb was allowed to have multiple and lengthy equipment timeouts for the same reason. Upon resumption of play Djokovic was broken twice and finally got a game on the board at 4–0 to a huge reception. Both players then held serve as Nadal wrapped up the set and the match, 7–5, 6–2.

Matches on O_{2} arena
Group	Winner	Loser	Score
Doubles – Group B	(South Africa) Wesley Moodie (Belgium) Dick Norman [8]	(Poland) Łukasz Kubot (Austria) Oliver Marach [5]	6–1, 6–3
Singles – Group A	(Czech Republic) Tomáš Berdych [6]	(United States) Andy Roddick [8]	7–5, 6–3
Doubles – Group B	(Canada) Daniel Nestor (Serbia) Nenad Zimonjić [2]	(India) Mahesh Bhupathi (Belarus) Max Mirnyi [4]	7–6(5), 7–6(1)
Singles – Group A	(Spain) Rafael Nadal [1]	(Serbia) Novak Djokovic [3]	7–5, 6–2
1st match started at 12:15 pm, 2nd not before 2 pm, 3rd at 6:15 pm and 4th not before 8 pm

=== Day 5 : 25 November 2010 ===
The number 1 ranked on doubles Bob and Mike Bryan defeated Lukáš Dlouhý and Leander Paes 6–3, 6–4, and closed their Round robin matches for this tournament. Dlouhý and Paes couldn't win any match in the tournament and were eliminated from it. In fact the pairing who were splitting had gone 0–6 in their appearances in the Tour finals together.

Then, the four-time winner Roger Federer won his last match of Round robin to go undefeated, beating Swede Robin Söderling 7–6(5), 6–3, and now their head-to-head is 15–1 for Federer. At the completion of the first set Federer won the group and at the end of the match Söderling was eliminated.

The match between Mariusz Fyrstenberg and Marcin Matkowski against Jürgen Melzer and Philipp Petzschner closed the matches for Doubles' Group A. The Polish couple won 6–3, 7–6(7) and qualified.

The final match of the day saw Andy Murray take on David Ferrer. Ferrer won the opening two games before Murray won six in a row to book his place in the semi-finals. Murray broke early in the second only to hand it back and break again immediately to close out a 6–2, 6–2 win.

Matches on O_{2} arena
Group	Winner	Loser	Score
Doubles – Group A	(United States) Bob Bryan (United States) Mike Bryan [1]	(Czech Republic) Lukáš Dlouhý (India) Leander Paes [3]	6–3, 6–4
Singles – Group B	(Switzerland) Roger Federer [2]	(Sweden) Robin Söderling [4]	7–6(5), 6–3
Doubles – Group A	(Poland) Mariusz Fyrstenberg (Poland) Marcin Matkowski [6]	(Austria) Jürgen Melzer (Germany) Philipp Petzschner [7]	6–3, 7–6(7)
Singles – Group B	(United Kingdom) Andy Murray [5]	(Spain) David Ferrer [7]	6–2, 6–2
1st match started at 12:15 pm, 2nd not before 2 pm, 3rd at 6:15 pm and 4th not before 8 pm

=== Day 6 : 26 November 2010 ===
Polish Łukasz Kubot and Austrian Oliver Marach defeated Canadian Daniel Nestor and Serb Nenad Zimonjić 6–0, 1–6, [10–6], but it was not enough to qualify to semifinals, and contrary Nestor and Zimonjić did it.

Then, Rafael Nadal defeated Tomáš Berdych and qualified to semifinals as the first of his group.

Closing doubles' matches for Round robin Mahesh Bhupathi and Max Mirnyi defeated Wesley Moodie and Dick Norman double 6–4 and they qualified to the semifinals as the second of Group B.

Closing Round robin matches for 2010 edition, Novak Djokovic defeated Andy Roddick 6–2, 6–3 and qualified to semifinals.

Matches on O_{2} arena
Group	Winner	Loser	Score
Doubles – Group B	(Poland) Łukasz Kubot (Austria) Oliver Marach [5]	(Canada) Daniel Nestor (Serbia) Nenad Zimonjić [2]	6–0, 1–6, [10–6]
Singles – Group A	(Spain) Rafael Nadal [1]	(Czech Republic) Tomáš Berdych [6]	7–6(3), 6–1
Doubles – Group B	(India) Mahesh Bhupathi (Belarus) Max Mirnyi [4]	(South Africa) Wesley Moodie (Belgium) Dick Norman [8]	6–4, 6–4
Singles – Group A	(Serbia) Novak Djokovic [3]	(United States) Andy Roddick [8]	6–2, 6–3
1st match started at 12:15 pm, 2nd not before 2 pm, 3rd at 6:15 pm and 4th not before 8 pm

=== Day 7 : 27 November 2010 ===
The semifinals began with a surprise as Nestor and Zimonjić knocked of the top-seeded Bryan double in three sets with a thrilling third one. They also saved a match point when they were down in the third set 9–10 before making three straight points to win.

They will face Bhupathi and Mirnyi in the final as they defeated the Polish pair Fyrstenberg and Matkowski in two sets. The Polish were under pressure most of the time saving four match points before giving up the fifth where Mirnyi forced Fyrstenberg into an error.

The first singles semi final saw world number 1 Rafael Nadal face home hero Andy Murray. Nadal edged the first set on a tie break after no breaks of serve. The highlight of the set was a 36 shot rally, which Murray won. Murray won the second set 6–3 breaking Nadal twice. Nadal in the third broke Murray before the Scot broke back when the Spaniard was serving for the match. After letting two match points go by, Nadal after 3 hours finally took the match in the final set tie break

Federer defeated Djokovic in straight sets to set up a final with his Spanish rival. This was to be just their second meeting this year after they had met at Madrid where Nadal won in straight sets.

Matches on O_{2} arena
Match	Winner	Loser	Score
Doubles – Semifinal	(Canada) Daniel Nestor (Serbia) Nenad Zimonjić [2]	(United States) Bob Bryan (United States) Mike Bryan [1]	6–3, 3–6, [12–10]
Singles – Semifinal	(Spain) Rafael Nadal [1]	(United Kingdom) Andy Murray [5]	7–6(5), 3–6, 7–6(6)
Doubles – Semifinal	(India) Mahesh Bhupathi (Belarus) Max Mirnyi [4]	(Poland) Mariusz Fyrstenberg (Poland) Marcin Matkowski [6]	6–4, 6–4
Singles – Semifinal	(Switzerland) Roger Federer [2]	(Serbia) Novak Djokovic [3]	6–1, 6–4
1st match started at 12:15 pm, 2nd not before 2 pm, 3rd at 6:15 pm and 4th not before 8 pm

=== Day 8 : 28 November 2010 ===
The day began with the doubles final between Daniel Nestor and Nenad Zimonjić, who beat top seeds and defending champions Bob and Mike Bryan in the semifinals, versus Mahesh Bhupathi and Max Mirnyi. The 2008 champions lifted their second title in doubles at the Barclays ATP World Tour Finals after beating 4th seeds in 1 hour and 21 minutes, with 7–6(6), 6–4.

Later, second seed Roger Federer beat top seed Rafael Nadal in their second match of the year to clinch his fifth title at the Barclays ATP World Tour Finals, equaling records of Pete Sampras and Ivan Lendl, both with 5 titles. In a match of 1 hour and 37 minutes, Federer completed his unbeatable tournament, winning in three sets, 6–3, 3–6, 6–1. Nadal continues to lead head-to-head against Federer, now 14–8, and in the ATP World Tour ranking.

Matches on O_{2} arena
Match	Champion	Runner up	Score
Doubles – Final	(Canada) Daniel Nestor (Serbia) Nenad Zimonjić [2]	(India) Mahesh Bhupathi (Belarus) Max Mirnyi [4]	7–6(6), 6–4
Singles – Final	(Switzerland) Roger Federer [2]	(Spain) Rafael Nadal [1]	6–3, 3–6, 6–1
1st match started at 3:30 pm, 2nd not before 5:30 pm

== Prize money and points ==
The total prize money for the 2010 Barclays ATP World Tour Finals was US$5 million.

Stage	Singles	Doubles^{1}	Points
Champion	+$770,000	+$125,000	+500
Semifinal win	+$380,000	+$30,000	+400
Round robin (3 wins)	$480,000^{2}	$122,500^{3}	600
Round robin (2 wins)	$360,000^{2}	$100,000^{3}	400
Round robin (1 win)	$240,000^{2}	$87,500^{3}	200
Round robin (0 wins)	$120,000^{2}	$65,000^{3}	0
Alternates	$70,000	$25,000	–

- ^{1} Prize money for doubles is per team.
- ^{2} Pro-rated on a per match basis: $70,000 = 1 match, $95,000 = 2 matches, $120,000 = 3 matches
- ^{3} Pro-rated on a per match basis: $30,000 = 1 match, $50,000 = 2 matches, $65,000 = 3 matches
