= 2010 Bank Austria-TennisTrophy – Doubles =

Doubles
- 2010 Bank Austria-TennisTrophy

Final
- Champions: (Canada) Daniel Nestor (Serbia) Nenad Zimonjić
- Runners-up: (Poland) Mariusz Fyrstenberg (Poland) Marcin Matkowski
- Score: 7–5, 3–6, [10–5]

Details
- Draw: 16
- Seeds: 4

Events
Singles	Doubles
- Vienna Open

Łukasz Kubot and Oliver Marach were the defending champions, but they lost to Mariusz Fyrstenberg and Marcin Matkowski in the semifinals.
Daniel Nestor and Nenad Zimonjić won the final against Mariusz Fyrstenberg and Marcin Matkowski 7–5, 3–6, [10–5].

== Seeds ==
1. (Canada) Daniel Nestor / (Serbia) Nenad Zimonjić (champions)
2. (Poland) Łukasz Kubot / (Austria) Oliver Marach (semifinals)
3. (Poland) Mariusz Fyrstenberg / (Poland) Marcin Matkowski (final)
4. (Austria) Julian Knowle / (Israel) Andy Ram (semifinals)

== Draw ==
Key

- Q = Qualifier
- WC = Wild card
- LL = Lucky loser
- Alt = Alternate
- ITF = ITF entry
- PR = Protected ranking
- SR = Special ranking
- SE = Special exempt
- JE = Junior exempt
- JR = Junior Accelerator Programme entrant
- CO = College Accelerator Programme entrant
- NG = Next Gen Accelerator Program entrant
- w/o = Walkover
- r = Retired
- d = Defaulted

=== Draw ===
First round
1	(Canada) D Nestor (Serbia) N Zimonjić	6	6
(Italy) A Seppi (Italy) S Vagnozzi	0	0
(Mexico) S González (Germany) P Marx	6	6
(Slovakia) K Beck (Czech Republic) L Dlouhý	4	3
4	(Austria) J Knowle (Israel) A Ram	7^{7}	6
WC	(Austria) A Haider-Maurer (Austria) N Moser	6^{1}	4
(Germany) M Kohlmann (Spain) P Riba	1	1
(Croatia) M Čilić (Croatia) L Zovko	6	6
(Germany) M Berrer (Netherlands) T de Bakker	6	3	[10]
WC	(Austria) G Melzer (Austria) J Melzer	4	6	[3]
(Brazil) M Melo (Brazil) B Soares	6^{5}	7	[5]
3	(Poland) M Fyrstenberg (Poland) M Matkowski	7^{7}	5	[10]
(Germany) C Kas (Germany) P Kohlschreiber	6	6
(Uruguay) P Cuevas (Spain) D Marrero	2	2
Alt	(Colombia) A Falla (Colombia) S Giraldo	0	4
2	(Poland) Ł Kubot (Austria) O Marach	6	6

Quarterfinals
1	(Canada) D Nestor (Serbia) N Zimonjić	4	7	[10]
(Mexico) S González (Germany) P Marx	6	5	[4]
4	(Austria) J Knowle (Israel) A Ram	6	7^{7}
(Croatia) M Čilić (Croatia) L Zovko	3	6^{1}
(Germany) M Berrer (Netherlands) T de Bakker	4	0
3	(Poland) M Fyrstenberg (Poland) M Matkowski	6	6
(Germany) C Kas (Germany) P Kohlschreiber
2	(Poland) Ł Kubot (Austria) O Marach	w/o

Semifinals
1	(Canada) D Nestor (Serbia) N Zimonjić	6	6
4	(Austria) J Knowle (Israel) A Ram	4	2
3	(Poland) M Fyrstenberg (Poland) M Matkowski	6^{3}	7^{7}	[10]
2	(Poland) Ł Kubot (Austria) O Marach	7^{7}	6^{2}	[6]

Final
1	(Canada) D Nestor (Serbia) N Zimonjić	7	3	[10]
3	(Poland) M Fyrstenberg (Poland) M Matkowski	5	6	[5]
