= 2010 ATP World Tour Finals – Doubles =

Doubles
- 2010 ATP World Tour Finals

Final
- Champions: (Canada) Daniel Nestor (Serbia) Nenad Zimonjić
- Runners-up: (India) Mahesh Bhupathi (Belarus) Max Mirnyi
- Score: 7–6^{(8–6)}, 6–4

Events
| Singles | Doubles |
| ← 2009 · | ATP World Tour Finals | · 2011 → |

Daniel Nestor and Nenad Zimonjić defeated Mahesh Bhupathi and Max Mirnyi in the final, 7–6^{(8–6)}, 6–4 to win the doubles tennis title at the 2010 ATP World Tour Finals.

Bob Bryan and Mike Bryan were the defending champions, but were defeated by Nestor and Zimonjić in the semifinals.

== Seeds ==
1. (United States) Bob Bryan / (United States) Mike Bryan (semifinals)
2. (Canada) Daniel Nestor / (Serbia) Nenad Zimonjić (champions)
3. (Czech Republic) Lukáš Dlouhý / (India) Leander Paes (round robin)
4. (India) Mahesh Bhupathi / (Belarus) Max Mirnyi (final)
5. (Poland) Łukasz Kubot / (Austria) Oliver Marach (round robin)
6. (Poland) Mariusz Fyrstenberg / (Poland) Marcin Matkowski (semifinals)
7. (Austria) Jürgen Melzer / (Germany) Philipp Petzschner (round robin)
8. (South Africa) Wesley Moodie / (Belgium) Dick Norman (round robin)

== Draw ==
=== Key ===
- Q = Qualifier
- WC = Wild card
- LL = Lucky loser
- Alt = Alternate
- SE = Special exempt
- PR = Protected ranking
- ITF = ITF entry
- JE = Junior exempt
- w/o = Walkover
- r = Retired
- d = Defaulted
- SR = Special ranking

=== Finals ===
Semifinals
6 | (Poland) Mariusz Fyrstenberg (Poland) Marcin Matkowski | 4 | 4
4 | (India) Mahesh Bhupathi (Belarus) Max Mirnyi | 6 | 6
1 | (United States) Bob Bryan (United States) Mike Bryan | 3 | 6 | [10]
2 | (Canada) Daniel Nestor (Serbia) Nenad Zimonjić | 6 | 3 | [12]

Final
4 | (India) Mahesh Bhupathi (Belarus) Max Mirnyi | 6^{6} | 4
2 | (Canada) Daniel Nestor (Serbia) Nenad Zimonjić | 7^{8} | 6

=== Group A ===
| | | (United States) Bryan (United States) Bryan | (Czech Republic) Dlouhý (India) Paes | (Poland) Fyrstenberg (Poland) Matkowski | (Austria) Melzer (Germany) Petzschner | RR W–L | Set W–L | Game W–L | Standings |
| 1 | (United States) Bob Bryan (United States) Mike Bryan | | 6–3, 6–4 | 6–2, 6–7^{(4–7)}, [8–10] | 6–3, 7–5 | 2–1 | 5–2 | 37–25 | 2 |
| 3 | (Czech Republic) Lukáš Dlouhý (India) Leander Paes | 3–6, 4–6 | | 3–6, 6–7^{(3–7)} | 6–7^{(9–11)}, 6–4, [8–10] | 0–3 | 1–6 | 28–37 | 4 |
| 6 | (Poland) Mariusz Fyrstenberg (Poland) Marcin Matkowski | 2–6, 7–6^{(7–4)}, [10–8] | 6–3, 7–6^{(7–3)} | | 6–3, 7–6^{(9–7)} | 3–0 | 6–1 | 36–31 | 1 |
| 7 | (Austria) Jürgen Melzer (Germany) Philipp Petzschner | 3–6, 5–7 | 7–6^{(11–9)}, 4–6, [10–8] | 3–6, 6–7^{(7–9)} | | 1–2 | 2–5 | 29–38 | 3 |

Standings are determined by: 1. number of wins; 2. number of matches; 3. in two-players-ties, head-to-head records; 4. in three-players-ties, percentage of sets won, or of games won; 5. steering-committee decision.

=== Group B ===
| | | (Canada) Nestor (Serbia) Zimonjić | (India) Bhupathi (Belarus) Mirnyi | (Poland) Kubot (Austria) Marach | (South Africa) Moodie (Belgium) Norman | RR W–L | Set W–L | Game W–L | Standings |
| 2 | (Canada) Daniel Nestor (Serbia) Nenad Zimonjić | | 7–6^{(7–5)}, 7–6^{(7–1)} | 0–6, 6–1, [6–10] | 6–1, 6–2 | 2–1 | 5–2 | 32–23 | 1 |
| 4 | (India) Mahesh Bhupathi (Belarus) Max Mirnyi | 6–7^{(5–7)}, 6–7^{(1–7)} | | 7–6^{(7–2)}, 6–4 | 6–4, 6–4 | 2–1 | 4–2 | 37–32 | 2 |
| 5 | (Poland) Łukasz Kubot (Austria) Oliver Marach | 6–0, 1–6, [10–6] | 6–7^{(2–7)}, 4–6 | | 1–6, 3–6 | 1–2 | 2–5 | 22–31 | 4 |
| 8 | (South Africa) Wesley Moodie (Belgium) Dick Norman | 1–6, 2–6 | 4–6, 4–6 | 6–1, 6–3 | | 1–2 | 2–4 | 23–28 | 3 |

Standings are determined by: 1. number of wins; 2. number of matches; 3. in two-players-ties, head-to-head records; 4. in three-players-ties, percentage of sets won, or of games won; 5. steering-committee decision.
