= 2010 ATP World Tour Finals – Singles =

Singles
- 2010 ATP World Tour Finals

Final
- Champion: (Switzerland) Roger Federer
- Runner-up: (Spain) Rafael Nadal
- Score: 6–3, 3–6, 6–1

Events
Singles	Doubles
← 2009 ·	ATP World Tour Finals	· 2011 →

Roger Federer defeated Rafael Nadal in the final, 6–3, 3–6, 6–1 to win the singles tennis title at the 2010 ATP World Tour Finals. It was his fifth Tour Finals title. Nadal was attempting to complete the career Super Slam. This tournament marks the only time in Federer's career where he defeated Nadal and Novak Djokovic to win a title.

Tomáš Berdych was the only player to make his debut at the event.

Nikolay Davydenko was the reigning champion, but did not qualify this year.

== Seeds ==
1. (Spain) Rafael Nadal (final)
2. (Switzerland) Roger Federer (champion)
3. (Serbia) Novak Djokovic (semifinals)
4. (Sweden) Robin Söderling (round robin)
5. (United Kingdom) Andy Murray (semifinals)
6. (Czech Republic) Tomáš Berdych (round robin)
7. (Spain) David Ferrer (round robin)
8. (United States) Andy Roddick (round robin)

== Alternates ==
1. (Spain) Fernando Verdasco (Did not play)
2. (Russia) Mikhail Youzhny (Did not play)

== Draw ==
=== Key ===
- Q = Qualifier
- WC = Wild card
- LL = Lucky loser
- Alt = Alternate
- ITF = ITF entry
- PR = Protected ranking
- SR = Special ranking
- SE = Special exempt
- JE = Junior exempt
- JR = Junior Accelerator Programme entrant
- CO = College Accelerator Programme entrant
- NG = Next Gen Accelerator Program entrant
- w/o = Walkover
- r = Retired
- d = Defaulted

=== Finals ===
Semifinals
1	(Spain) Rafael Nadal	7^{7}	3	7^{8}
5	(United Kingdom) Andy Murray	6^{5}	6	6^{6}
2	(Switzerland) Roger Federer	6	6
3	(Serbia) Novak Djokovic	1	4

Final
1	(Spain) Rafael Nadal	3	6	1
2	(Switzerland) Roger Federer	6	3	6

=== Group A ===
		(Spain) Nadal	(Serbia) Djokovic	(Czech Republic) Berdych	(United States) Roddick	RR W–L	Set W–L	Game W–L	Standings
1	(Spain) Rafael Nadal		7–5, 6–2	7–6^{(7–3)}, 6–1	3–6, 7–6^{(7–5)}, 6–4	3–0	6–1	42–30	1
3	(Serbia) Novak Djokovic	5–7, 2–6		6–3, 6–3	6–2, 6–3	2–1	4–2	31–24	2
6	(Czech Republic) Tomáš Berdych	6–7^{(3–7)}, 1–6	3–6, 3–6		7–5, 6–3	1–2	2–4	26–33	3
8	(United States) Andy Roddick	6–3, 6–7^{(5–7)}, 4–6	2–6, 3–6	5–7, 3–6		0–3	1–6	29–41	4

Standings are determined by: 1. number of wins; 2. number of matches; 3. in two-players-ties, head-to-head records; 4. in three-players-ties, percentage of sets won, or of games won; 5. steering-committee decision.

=== Group B ===
		(Switzerland) Federer	(Sweden) Söderling	(United Kingdom) Murray	(Spain) Ferrer	RR W–L	Set W–L	Game W–L	Standings
2	(Switzerland) Roger Federer		7–6^{(7–5)}, 6–3	6–4, 6–2	6–1, 6–4	3–0	6–0	37–20	1
4	(Sweden) Robin Söderling	6–7^{(5–7)}, 3–6		2–6, 4–6	7–5, 7–5	1–2	2–4	29–35	3
5	(United Kingdom) Andy Murray	4–6, 2–6	6–2, 6–4		6–2, 6–2	2–1	4–2	30–22	2
7	(Spain) David Ferrer	1–6, 4–6	5–7, 5–7	2–6, 2–6		0–3	0–6	19–38	4

Standings are determined by: 1. number of wins; 2. number of matches; 3. in two-players-ties, head-to-head records; 4. in three-players-ties, percentage of sets won, or of games won; 5. steering-committee decision.

== See also ==
- ATP World Tour Finals appearances
