= 2010 Bank Austria-TennisTrophy – Singles =

Singles
- 2010 Bank Austria-TennisTrophy

Final
- Champion: (Austria) Jürgen Melzer
- Runner-up: (Austria) Andreas Haider-Maurer
- Score: 6–7^{(10–12)}, 7–6^{(7–4)}, 6–4

Details
- Draw: 28
- Seeds: 8

Events
Singles	Doubles
- Vienna Open

Jürgen Melzer was the defending champion. He successfully defended his last year's title by beating Lucky loser and his compatriot, Andreas Haider-Maurer 6–7^{(10–12)}, 7–6^{(7–4)}, 6–4 in the final match.

== Seeds ==
The top four seeds received a bye into the second round.

1. (Austria) Jürgen Melzer (champion)
2. (Croatia) Marin Čilić (quarterfinals)
3. (Spain) Nicolás Almagro (semifinals)
4. (Cyprus) Marcos Baghdatis (quarterfinals)
5. (Latvia) Ernests Gulbis (withdrew due to personal reasons)
6. (Spain) Guillermo García-López (first round)
7. (Germany) Philipp Kohlschreiber (quarterfinals, withdrew because of a right abductor injury)
8. (Argentina) Juan Ignacio Chela (quarterfinals)

== Draw ==
Key

- Q = Qualifier
- WC = Wild card
- LL = Lucky loser
- Alt = Alternate
- ITF = ITF entry
- PR = Protected ranking
- SR = Special ranking
- SE = Special exempt
- JE = Junior exempt
- JR = Junior Accelerator Programme entrant
- CO = College Accelerator Programme entrant
- NG = Next Gen Accelerator Program entrant
- w/o = Walkover
- r = Retired
- d = Defaulted

=== Finals ===
Semifinals
1	(Austria) Jürgen Melzer	6	6
3	(Spain) Nicolás Almagro	4	4
(Germany) Michael Berrer	6^{6}	7^{7}	3
LL	(Austria) Andreas Haider-Maurer	7^{8}	6^{1}	6

Final
1	(Austria) Jürgen Melzer	6^{10}	7^{7}	6
LL	(Austria) Andreas Haider-Maurer	7^{12}	6^{4}	4

=== Top half ===
First round
WC	(United States) J Blake	4	4
(Poland) Ł Kubot	6	6
(Germany) T Kamke	6	6
Q	(Germany) M Bachinger	4	4
(Colombia) A Falla	0	3
7	(Germany) P Kohlschreiber	6	6
(Belgium) X Malisse	4	6	1
(Colombia) S Giraldo	6	1	6
Q	(Turkey) M İlhan	6	1	5
Q	(Slovenia) G Žemlja	4	6	7
Q	(Slovakia) A Martin	3	3
8	(Argentina) JI Chela	6	6

Second round
1	(Austria) J Melzer	7^{7}	7^{7}
(Poland) Ł Kubot	6^{3}	6^{2}
(Germany) T Kamke	4	6	1
7	(Germany) P Kohlschreiber	6	3	6
3	(Spain) N Almagro	7^{7}	6^{3}	6
(Colombia) S Giraldo	6^{4}	7^{7}	3
Q	(Slovenia) G Žemlja	6	6^{5}	3
8	(Argentina) JI Chela	2	7^{7}	6

Quarterfinals
1	(Austria) J Melzer	w/o
7	(Germany) P Kohlschreiber
3	(Spain) N Almagro	7	3	6
8	(Argentina) JI Chela	5	6	3

Semifinals
1	(Austria) J Melzer	6	6
3	(Spain) N Almagro	4	4

=== Bottom half ===
First round
6	(Spain) G García-López	3	6	5
(Germany) M Berrer	6	4	7
(Netherlands) T de Bakker	6^{6}	6	4
(Uruguay) P Cuevas	7^{8}	1	6
(Germany) B Phau	6	6
(Germany) F Mayer	2	4
LL	(Austria) A Haider-Maurer	6	7^{7}
WC	(Austria) T Muster	2	6^{5}
WC	(Austria) M Fischer	3	3
(Italy) A Seppi	6	6
(Czech Republic) J Hájek	6	6
(Spain) P Riba	0	2

Second round
(Germany) M Berrer	5	6	6
(Uruguay) P Cuevas	7	3	3
(Germany) B Phau	5	2
4	(Cyprus) M Baghdatis	7	6
LL	(Austria) A Haider-Maurer	6	6^{7}	7^{7}
(Italy) A Seppi	3	7^{9}	6^{2}
(Czech Republic) J Hájek	6^{4}	2
2	(Croatia) M Čilić	7^{7}	6

Quarterfinals
(Germany) M Berrer	5	6	6
4	(Cyprus) M Baghdatis	7	1	4
LL	(Austria) A Haider-Maurer	7^{7}	6
2	(Croatia) M Čilić	6^{1}	4

Semifinals
(Germany) M Berrer	6^{6}	7^{7}	3
LL	(Austria) A Haider-Maurer	7^{8}	6^{1}	6
