= 2010 Bank Austria-TennisTrophy =

- Date: 23–31 October
- Edition: 36th
- Category: ATP World Tour 250 Series
- Draw: 32S / 16D
- Prize money: €575,250
- Surface: Hard / indoor
- Location: Vienna, Austria
- Venue: Wiener Stadthalle

Champions

Singles
- (Austria) Jürgen Melzer

Doubles
- (Canada) Daniel Nestor / (Serbia) Nenad Zimonjić
- Vienna Open

The 2010 Bank Austria-TennisTrophy was a tennis tournament to be played on indoor hard courts. It was the 36th edition of the event known that year as the Bank Austria-TennisTrophy, and part of the ATP World Tour 250 Series of the 2010 ATP World Tour. It was held at the Wiener Stadthalle in Vienna, Austria, from October 23 through October 31, 2010.

== Finals ==
=== Singles ===
(Austria) Jürgen Melzer defeated (Austria) Andreas Haider-Maurer 6–7^{(10–12)}, 7–6^{(7–4)}, 6–4

- It was Melzer's first title of the year and 3rd of his career. He defended his title.

=== Doubles ===
(Canada) Daniel Nestor / (Serbia) Nenad Zimonjić defeated (Poland) Mariusz Fyrstenberg / (Poland) Marcin Matkowski, 7–5, 3–6, [10–5]

== Entrants ==
=== Seeds ===
Country	Player	Rank^{1}	Seed
AUT	Jürgen Melzer	12	1
CRO	Marin Čilić	14	2
ESP	Nicolás Almagro	16	3
CYP	Marcos Baghdatis	19	4
LAT	Ernests Gulbis	24	5
ESP	Guillermo García-López	29	6
GER	Philipp Kohlschreiber	33	7
ARG	Juan Ignacio Chela	40	8

- Seeds are based on the rankings of October 18, 2010.

=== Other entrants ===
The following players received wildcards into the singles main draw:

- (United States) James Blake
- (Austria) Martin Fischer
- (Austria) Thomas Muster

The following players received entry from the qualifying draw:

- (Germany) Matthias Bachinger
- (Turkey) Marsel İlhan
- (Slovakia) Andrej Martin
- (Slovenia) Grega Žemlja

The following player received entry as a Lucky loser into the singles main draw:

- (Austria) Andreas Haider-Maurer
