= 2010 BNP Paribas Masters =

- Date: 6–14 November
- Edition: 38th
- Category: ATP World Tour Masters 1000
- Draw: 64S / 32D
- Prize money: $2,620,588
- Surface: Hard / indoor
- Location: Paris, France
- Venue: Palais omnisports de Paris-Bercy

Champions

Singles
- (Sweden) Robin Söderling

Doubles
- (India) Mahesh Bhupathi / (Belarus) Max Mirnyi
- Paris Masters

The 2010 BNP Paribas Masters was a tennis tournament played on indoor hard courts. It was the 38th edition of the tournament known that year as the BNP Paribas Masters after the sponsor BNP Paribas. It was part of the ATP World Tour Masters 1000 of the 2010 ATP World Tour. It was held at the Palais omnisports de Paris-Bercy in Paris, France, from 6 November through 14 November 2010. The top eight seeds were Roger Federer, defending champion Novak Djokovic, Andy Murray, Robin Söderling, Tomáš Berdych, Fernando Verdasco, David Ferrer and Andy Roddick.

Robin Söderling defeated Gaël Monfils 6–1, 7–6^{(7–1)} in the final to win his first Masters 1000 championship and rise to a career-high world ranking of No. 4. Monfils was playing in his second successive Paris Masters final having saved five match points in defeating Roger Federer in the semifinals.

== Finals ==
=== Singles ===
(Sweden) Robin Söderling defeated (France) Gaël Monfils 6–1, 7–6^{(7–1)}

- It was Söderling's second title of the year and 6th of his career. It was his first Masters title.

=== Doubles ===
(India) Mahesh Bhupathi / (Belarus) Max Mirnyi defeated (The Bahamas) Mark Knowles / (Israel) Andy Ram 7–5, 7–5

== Entrants ==
=== Seeds ===
| Country | Player | Rank^{1} | Seed |
|---|---|---|---|
| SUI | Roger Federer | 2 | 1 |
| SRB | Novak Djokovic | 3 | 2 |
| GBR | Andy Murray | 4 | 3 |
| SWE | Robin Söderling | 5 | 4 |
| CZE | Tomáš Berdych | 6 | 5 |
| ESP | Fernando Verdasco | 7 | 6 |
| ESP | David Ferrer | 8 | 7 |
| USA | Andy Roddick | 9 | 8 |
| RUS | Mikhail Youzhny | 10 | 9 |
| RUS | Nikolay Davydenko | 11 | 10 |
| AUT | Jürgen Melzer | 12 | 11 |
| FRA | Gaël Monfils | 14 | 12 |
| CRO | Marin Čilić | 15 | 13 |
| ESP | Nicolás Almagro | 16 | 14 |
| CRO | Ivan Ljubičić | 17 | 15 |
| USA | John Isner | 19 | 16 |

- Seeds are based on the rankings of November 1, 2010.

=== Other entrants ===
The following players received wildcards into the singles main draw:

- (France) Arnaud Clément
- (France) Nicolas Mahut
- (France) Florent Serra

The following player received a special exempt into the singles main draw:

- (Spain) Marcel Granollers

The following players received entry from the qualifying draw:

- (Germany) Benjamin Becker
- (Italy) Fabio Fognini
- (Colombia) Santiago Giraldo
- (Ukraine) Illya Marchenko
- (Finland) Jarkko Nieminen
- (France) Josselin Ouanna

The following players received entry as a Lucky loser into the singles main draw:

- (United States) Michael Russell

=== Notable withdrawals ===
- (Spain) Rafael Nadal (shoulder injury)
- (France) Jo-Wilfried Tsonga (knee injury)
- (Cyprus) Marcos Baghdatis (shoulder injury)
- (Spain) Juan Carlos Ferrero (knee & wrist surgery)
- (United States) Mardy Fish (ankle injury)
