= 2010 Swiss Indoors =

- Date: 1–7 November
- Edition: 41st
- Category: ATP World Tour 500
- Draw: 32S / 16D
- Prize money: €1,225,000
- Location: Basel, Switzerland
- Venue: St. Jakobshalle

Champions

Singles
- (Switzerland) Roger Federer

Doubles
- (United States) Bob Bryan / (United States) Mike Bryan
← 2009 ·	Swiss Indoors	· 2011 →

The 2010 Swiss Indoors was a men's tennis tournament played on indoor hard courts. It was the 41st edition of the event known that year as the Davidoff Swiss Indoors, and was part of the 500 Series of the 2010 ATP World Tour. It was held at the St. Jakobshalle in Basel, Switzerland, from 1 November through 7 November 2010. Roger Federer won the singles title.

== Finals ==
=== Singles ===
(Switzerland) Roger Federer defeated (Serbia) Novak Djokovic, 6–4, 3–6, 6–1

- It was Federer's 4th title of the year and 65th of his career. It was his 4th win at the event, also winning in 2006-2008.

=== Doubles ===
(United States) Bob Bryan / (United States) Mike Bryan defeated (Canada) Daniel Nestor / (Serbia) Nenad Zimonjić, 6–3, 3–6, [10–3]

== Players ==
=== Seeds ===
Country	Player	Rank^{1}	Seed
SUI	Roger Federer	2	1
SRB	Novak Djokovic	3	2
CZE	Tomáš Berdych	6	3
USA	Andy Roddick	9	4
AUT	Jürgen Melzer	12	5
CRO	Marin Čilić	14	6
CRO	Ivan Ljubičić	17	7
USA	John Isner	19	8

- Seeds are based on the rankings of October 25, 2010

=== Other entrants ===
The following players received wildcards into the singles main draw:

- (Switzerland) Stéphane Bohli
- (Switzerland) Marco Chiudinelli
- (Czech Republic) Radek Štěpánek

The following players received entry from the qualifying draw:

- (Germany) Daniel Brands
- (Netherlands) Robin Haase
- (Czech Republic) Jan Hájek
- (Finland) Jarkko Nieminen

The following players received entries as a Lucky losers into the singles main draw:

- (Slovakia) Karol Beck
- (Germany) Tobias Kamke
- (France) Paul-Henri Mathieu
