= 2010 Shanghai Rolex Masters =

- Date: October 9–17
- Edition: 2nd
- Category: ATP World Tour Masters 1000
- Surface: Hard / outdoor
- Location: Shanghai, China
- Venue: Qizhong Forest Sports City Arena

Champions

Singles
- (United Kingdom) Andy Murray

Doubles
- (Austria) Jürgen Melzer / (India) Leander Paes
- Shanghai Masters

The 2010 Shanghai Rolex Masters was a men's tennis tournament played on outdoor hard courts. It was the second edition of the Shanghai ATP Masters 1000, classified as an ATP World Tour Masters 1000 event on the 2010 ATP World Tour. It took place at Qizhong Forest Sports City Arena in Shanghai, China. This edition was held from October 9 to October 17, 2010. Fourth-seeded Andy Murray won the singles title.

== Entrants ==
=== Seeds ===
Country	Player	Rank^{1}	Seed
ESP	Rafael Nadal	1	1
SRB	Novak Djokovic	2	2
SUI	Roger Federer	3	3
GBR	Andy Murray	4	4
SWE	Robin Söderling	5	5
RUS	Nikolay Davydenko	6	6
CZE	Tomáš Berdych	7	7
RUS	Mikhail Youzhny	8	8
ESP	Fernando Verdasco	9	9
USA	Andy Roddick	10	10
ESP	David Ferrer	11	11
FRA	Jo-Wilfried Tsonga	12	12
AUT	Jürgen Melzer	13	13
CRO	Marin Čilić	14	14
FRA	Gaël Monfils	15	15
ESP	Nicolás Almagro	16	16

- Rankings are as of October 4, 2010.

=== Other entrants ===
The following players received wildcards into the singles main draw:

- (China) Wu Di
- (China) Bai Yan
- (Chinese Taipei) Yang Tsung-hua
- (China) Zhang Ze

The following players received entry from the qualifying draw:

- (South Africa) Kevin Anderson
- (Germany) Benjamin Becker
- (France) Jérémy Chardy
- (Turkey) Marsel İlhan
- (Poland) Łukasz Kubot
- (France) Florent Serra
- (Germany) Mischa Zverev

The following players received entry as a Lucky loser into the singles main draw:

- (Spain) Daniel Gimeno Traver

== Finals ==
=== Singles ===
(United Kingdom) Andy Murray defeated (Switzerland) Roger Federer, 6–3, 6–2.

- It was Murray's 2nd title of the year and 16th of his career. It was his 6th Masters 1000 title of his career.

=== Doubles ===
(Austria) Jürgen Melzer / (India) Leander Paes defeated (Poland) Mariusz Fyrstenberg / (Poland) Marcin Matkowski, 7–5, 4–6, [10–5].
