= 2011 Qatar Open – Singles qualifying =

Singles qualifying
- 2011 Qatar ExxonMobil Open

Events
| Singles | Doubles |
| ← 2010 · | Qatar ExxonMobil Open | · 2012 → |

== Players ==
=== Seeds ===
The top two seeds received a bye into the second round.

1. (Switzerland) Marco Chiudinelli (qualifier)
2. (Serbia) Ilija Bozoljac (qualifying round)
3. (Czech Republic) Lukáš Rosol (qualifier)
4. (Netherlands) Thomas Schoorel (qualifier)
5. (Croatia) Antonio Veić (qualifier)
6. (Serbia) Nikola Ćirić (qualifying round)
7. (United Kingdom) James Ward (first round)
8. (Slovakia) Marek Semjan (qualifying round)

=== Qualifiers ===
1. (Switzerland) Marco Chiudinelli
2. (Croatia) Antonio Veić
3. (Czech Republic) Lukáš Rosol
4. (Netherlands) Thomas Schoorel

== Draw ==
=== Key ===
- Q = Qualifier
- WC = Wild card
- LL = Lucky loser
- Alt = Alternate
- SE = Special exempt
- PR = Protected ranking
- ITF = ITF entry
- JE = Junior exempt
- w/o = Walkover
- r = Retired
- d = Defaulted
- SR = Special ranking

=== First qualifier ===
First round
1 | (Switzerland) Marco Chiudinelli
bye
(Serbia) Marko Djokovic | 6 | 6
(Chinese Taipei) Chen Ti | 4 | 3
(Belgium) Yannick Mertens | 6 | 6
WC | (Italy) Filippo Sassi | 1 | 0
(Russia) Mikhail Ledovskikh | 6 | 4 | 6
7 | (United Kingdom) James Ward | 2 | 6 | 3

Second round
1 | (Switzerland) Marco Chiudinelli | 2 | 6 | 6
(Serbia) Marko Djokovic | 6 | 4 | 2
(Belgium) Yannick Mertens | 7 | 3 | 6
(Russia) Mikhail Ledovskikh | 5 | 6 | 4

Qualifying Round
1 | (Switzerland) Marco Chiudinelli | 6 | 7
(Belgium) Yannick Mertens | 1 | 6^{2}

=== Second qualifier ===
First round
2 | (Serbia) Ilija Bozoljac
bye
(Egypt) Ramy Labna | 0 | 0
(Germany) Simon Stadler | 6 | 6
WC | (Qatar) Abdulrahman Al Harib | 0 | 1
(Germany) Christopher Kas | 6 | 6
(Spain) David Marrero | 3 | 4
5 | (Croatia) Antonio Veić | 6 | 6

Second round
2 | (Serbia) Ilija Bozoljac | 7 | 6
(Germany) Simon Stadler | 6^{6} | 3
(Germany) Christopher Kas | 4 | 6 | 1
5 | (Croatia) Antonio Veić | 6 | 3 | 6

Qualifying Round
2 | (Serbia) Ilija Bozoljac | 7 | 6^{3} | 4
5 | (Croatia) Antonio Veić | 5 | 7 | 6

=== Third qualifier ===
First round
3 | (Czech Republic) Lukáš Rosol | 6 | 6^{2} | 6
(Uzbekistan) Farrukh Dustov | 3 | 7 | 3
(Croatia) Nikola Mektić | 6 | 6^{2} | 6
(Russia) Alexander Lobkov | 2 | 7 | 1
WC | (Qatar) Mubarak Zaid | 0 | 0
(Czech Republic) František Čermák | 6 | 6
(Kuwait) Mohammed Reda | 5 | 2
6 | (Serbia) Nikola Ćirić | 7 | 6

Second round
3 | (Czech Republic) Lukáš Rosol | 6 | 7
(Croatia) Nikola Mektić | 2 | 6^{5}
(Czech Republic) František Čermák | 6^{5} | 7 | 3
6 | (Serbia) Nikola Ćirić | 7 | 6^{2} | 6

Qualifying Round
3 | (Czech Republic) Lukáš Rosol | 4 | 6 | 6
6 | (Serbia) Nikola Ćirić | 6 | 4 | 4

=== Fourth qualifier ===
First round
4 | (Netherlands) Thomas Schoorel | 6 | 6
(Italy) Gianluca Naso | 4 | 4
(Lebanon) John El Khoury | 1 | 3
(Sweden) Johan Brunström | 6 | 6
(Slovakia) Igor Zelenay | 6 | 3 | 6
(Slovakia) Filip Polášek | 3 | 6 | 3
WC | (Syria) Ahmed Abdrabuh | 0 | 0
8 | (Slovakia) Marek Semjan | 6 | 6

Second round
4 | (Netherlands) Thomas Schoorel | 3 | 6 | 6
(Sweden) Johan Brunström | 6 | 3 | 1
(Slovakia) Igor Zelenay | 6 | 2 | 2
8 | (Slovakia) Marek Semjan | 4 | 6 | 6

Qualifying Round
4 | (Netherlands) Thomas Schoorel | 6 | 7
8 | (Slovakia) Marek Semjan | 3 | 5
