= 2013 Open 13 – Singles =

Singles
- 2013 Open 13

Final
- Champion: (France) Jo-Wilfried Tsonga
- Runner-up: (Czech Republic) Tomáš Berdych
- Score: 3–6, 7–6^{(8–6)}, 6–4

Details
- Draw: 28 (4 Q / 3 WC )
- Seeds: 8

Events
Singles	Doubles
← 2012 ·	Open 13	· 2014 →

Juan Martín del Potro was the defending champion, but lost to Gilles Simon in the quarterfinals.
Jo-Wilfried Tsonga won the title, defeating Tomáš Berdych in the final, 3–6, 7–6^{(8–6)}, 6–4.

== Seeds ==
The top four seeds receive a bye into the second round.

1. (Czech Republic) Tomáš Berdych (final)
2. (Argentina) Juan Martín del Potro (quarterfinals)
3. (France) Jo-Wilfried Tsonga (champion)
4. (Serbia) Janko Tipsarević (second round)
5. (France) Richard Gasquet (first round)
6. (France) Gilles Simon (semifinals)
7. (Poland) Jerzy Janowicz (quarterfinals)
8. (Slovakia) Martin Kližan (first round)

== Draw ==
=== Key ===
- Q = Qualifier
- WC = Wild card
- LL = Lucky loser
- Alt = Alternate
- SE = Special exempt
- PR = Protected ranking
- ITF = ITF entry
- JE = Junior exempt
- w/o = Walkover
- r = Retired
- d = Defaulted
- SR = Special ranking

=== Finals ===
Semifinals
1	(Czech Republic) Tomáš Berdych	6	6
Q	(Russia) Dmitry Tursunov	2	1
3	(France) Jo-Wilfried Tsonga	6	6
6	(France) Gilles Simon	2	2

Final
1	(Czech Republic) Tomáš Berdych	6	6^{6}	4
3	(France) Jo-Wilfried Tsonga	3	7^{8}	6

=== Top half ===
First round
WC	(Latvia) E Gulbis	6	6
(Finland) J Nieminen	3	2
(France) J Benneteau	7^{7}	6
WC	(France) L Pouille	6^{0}	3
(Czech Republic) L Rosol	2	4
7	(Poland) J Janowicz	6	6
Q	(Russia) D Tursunov	7	6
Q	(France) É Roger-Vasselin	5	3
WC	(France) G Monfils	4	4
(Spain) M Granollers	6	6
(Luxembourg) G Müller	2	6	7^{7}
5	(France) R Gasquet	6	4	6^{5}

Second round
1	(Czech Republic) T Berdych	6	6^{10}	6
WC	(Latvia) E Gulbis	4	7^{12}	4
(France) J Benneteau	6^{0}	3
7	(Poland) J Janowicz	7^{7}	6
4	(Serbia) J Tipsarević	6^{4}	2
Q	(Russia) D Tursunov	7^{7}	6
(Spain) M Granollers	6^{2}	6^{1}
(Luxembourg) G Müller	7^{7}	7^{7}

Quarterfinals
1	(Czech Republic) T Berdych	6	6^{0}	6
7	(Poland) J Janowicz	3	7^{7}	3
Q	(Russia) D Tursunov	7^{9}	1	7
(Luxembourg) G Müller	6^{7}	6	5

Semifinals
1	(Czech Republic) T Berdych	6	6
Q	(Russia) D Tursunov	2	1

=== Bottom half ===
First round
8	(Slovakia) M Kližan	6	3	6^{7}
(Australia) B Tomic	4	6	7^{9}
(France) B Paire	6^{6}	7^{9}	4
PR	(India) S Devvarman	7^{8}	6^{7}	6
Q	(Ukraine) S Stakhovsky	2	6	2
(Russia) N Davydenko	6	4	6
6	(France) G Simon	7	7
(Netherlands) R Haase	5	5
Q	(Serbia) F Krajinović	6	6^{5}	0
(Spain) R Bautista Agut	4	7^{7}	6
(France) M Llodra	6	6
(Belgium) D Goffin	2	4

Second round
(Australia) B Tomic	6	7
PR	(India) S Devvarman	3	5
(Russia) N Davydenko	6^{1}	3
3	(France) J-W Tsonga	7^{7}	6
6	(France) G Simon	6	6
(Spain) R Bautista Agut	3	1
(France) M Llodra	6	6^{4}	5
2	(Argentina) JM del Potro	3	7^{7}	7

Quarterfinals
(Australia) B Tomic	6	3	6^{10}
3	(France) J-W Tsonga	4	6	7^{12}
6	(France) G Simon	6	6
2	(Argentina) JM del Potro	4	3

Semifinals
3	(France) J-W Tsonga	6	6
6	(France) G Simon	2	2

== Qualifying ==
=== Seeds ===
1. (France) Édouard Roger-Vasselin (qualified)
2. (Ukraine) Sergiy Stakhovsky (qualified)
3. (France) Josselin Ouanna (first round)
4. (Russia) Dmitry Tursunov (qualified)
5. (Belgium) Maxime Authom (first round)
6. (Kazakhstan) Mikhail Kukushkin (first round)
7. (France) Adrian Mannarino (first round)
8. (Czech Republic) Jan Mertl (qualifying competition)

=== Qualifiers ===
1. (France) Édouard Roger-Vasselin
2. (Ukraine) Sergiy Stakhovsky
3. (Serbia) Filip Krajinović
4. (Russia) Dmitry Tursunov

=== Draw ===
==== First qualifier ====
First round
1	(France) Édouard Roger-Vasselin	6	6
(Italy) Riccardo Ghedin	4	2
(France) Grégoire Burquier	6^{5}	6^{3}
(Spain) Guillermo Olaso	7^{7}	7^{7}
(United Kingdom) Jamie Baker	2	6^{4}
(China) Wu Di	6	7^{7}
(France) Maxime Teixeira	7^{7}	6
5	(Belgium) Maxime Authom	6^{4}	4

Second round
1	(France) Édouard Roger-Vasselin	6	6
(Spain) Guillermo Olaso	2	4
(China) Wu Di	6^{4}	6	3
(France) Maxime Teixeira	7^{7}	2	6

Qualifying competition
1	(France) Édouard Roger-Vasselin	6	6
(France) Maxime Teixeira	2	3

==== Second qualifier ====
First round
2	(Ukraine) Sergiy Stakhovsky	6	6
WC	(France) Maxime Chazal	2	1
(France) Jonathan Eysseric	2	4
(Germany) Nils Langer	6	6
(France) Axel Michon	4	4
(Kazakhstan) Evgeny Korolev	6	6
(France) Fabrice Martin	7	6^{5}	3
8	(Czech Republic) Jan Mertl	5	7^{7}	6

Second round
2	(Ukraine) Sergiy Stakhovsky	6	6
(Germany) Nils Langer	1	1
(Kazakhstan) Evgeny Korolev	7^{7}	2	4
8	(Czech Republic) Jan Mertl	6^{3}	6	6

Qualifying competition
2	(Ukraine) Sergiy Stakhovsky	6	6
8	(Czech Republic) Jan Mertl	3	2

==== Third qualifier ====
First round
3	(France) Josselin Ouanna	6	5	6^{3}
(France) Vincent Millot	4	7	7^{7}
(France) David Guez	6	5	4
(Italy) Thomas Fabbiano	3	7	6
(Serbia) Filip Krajinović	6	6
WC	(France) Maxime Tchoutakian	3	0
(Italy) Alessandro Giannessi	2	6	6
6	(Kazakhstan) Mikhail Kukushkin	6	3	3

Second round
(France) Vincent Millot	4	3
(Italy) Thomas Fabbiano	6	6
(Serbia) Filip Krajinović	6	6
(Italy) Alessandro Giannessi	4	0

Qualifying competition
(Italy) Thomas Fabbiano	4	6	3
(Serbia) Filip Krajinović	6	3	6

==== Fourth qualifier ====
First round
4	(Russia) Dmitry Tursunov	6	5	6
WC	(France) Mathias Bourgue	2	7	3
(Spain) Adrián Menéndez	6	6
WC	(France) Martin Vaïsse	2	4
(France) Nicolas Renavand	2	4
(Czech Republic) Jan Hernych	6	6
(Serbia) Ilija Bozoljac	2	7^{7}	6
7	(France) Adrian Mannarino	6	6^{5}	4

Second round
4	(Russia) Dmitry Tursunov	6	7^{7}
(Spain) Adrián Menéndez	3	6^{5}
(Czech Republic) Jan Hernych	7^{7}	3	6
(Serbia) Ilija Bozoljac	6^{5}	6	4

Qualifying competition
4	(Russia) Dmitry Tursunov	6	7
(Czech Republic) Jan Hernych	4	5
