= 2011 Qatar Open – Singles =

Singles
- 2011 Qatar Open

Final
- Champion: (Switzerland) Roger Federer
- Runner-up: (Russia) Nikolay Davydenko
- Score: 6–3, 6–4

Details
- Draw: 32 (4 Q / 3 WC )
- Seeds: 8

Events
Singles	Doubles
← 2010 ·	ATP Qatar Open	· 2012 →

Nikolay Davydenko was the defending champion, but lost to Roger Federer 6–3, 6–4 in the final. Federer did not lose a single set in the entire tournament.

== Seeds ==
1. (Spain) Rafael Nadal (semifinals)
2. (Switzerland) Roger Federer (champion)
3. (France) Jo-Wilfried Tsonga (semifinals)
4. (Russia) Nikolay Davydenko (final)
5. (Latvia) Ernests Gulbis (quarterfinals)
6. (Serbia) Viktor Troicki (quarterfinals)
7. (Spain) Guillermo García-López (quarterfinals)
8. (Germany) Philipp Kohlschreiber (second round)

== Draw ==
=== Key ===
- Q = Qualifier
- WC = Wild card
- LL = Lucky loser
- Alt = Alternate
- SE = Special exempt
- PR = Protected ranking
- ITF = ITF entry
- JE = Junior exempt
- w/o = Walkover
- r = Retired
- d = Defaulted
- SR = Special ranking

=== Finals ===
Semifinals
1	(Spain) Rafael Nadal	3	2
4	(Russia) Nikolay Davydenko	6	6
3	(France) Jo-Wilfried Tsonga	3	6^{2}
2	(Switzerland) Roger Federer	6	7^{7}

Final
4	(Russia) Nikolay Davydenko	3	4
2	(Switzerland) Roger Federer	6	6

=== Top half ===
First round
1	(Spain) R Nadal	6	6
(Slovakia) K Beck	3	0
(Slovakia) L Lacko	5	7^{9}	7^{7}
(Spain) P Riba	7	6^{7}	6^{4}
Q	(Croatia) A Veić	3	7	6
WC	(Egypt) S Sabry	6	5	0
(Romania) V Hănescu	3	6^{6}
5	(Latvia) E Gulbis	6	7^{8}
4	(Russia) N Davydenko	6	6
(Italy) F Fognini	1	4
(Finland) J Nieminen	6	3	6
(Poland) M Przysiężny	2	6	3
(Croatia) I Karlović	7^{7}	7^{9}
Q	(Czech Republic) L Rosol	6^{5}	6^{7}
(Italy) A Seppi	2	4
8	(Germany) P Kohlschreiber	6	6

Second round
1	(Spain) R Nadal	7^{7}	0	6
(Slovakia) L Lacko	6^{3}	6	3
Q	(Croatia) A Veić	3	1
5	(Latvia) E Gulbis	6	6
4	(Russia) N Davydenko	6	7
(Finland) J Nieminen	4	5
(Croatia) I Karlović	7^{7}	6^{4}	7^{7}
8	(Germany) P Kohlschreiber	6^{5}	7^{7}	6^{2}

Quarterfinals
1	(Spain) R Nadal	7^{7}	6
5	(Latvia) E Gulbis	6^{3}	3
4	(Russia) N Davydenko	6	7
(Croatia) I Karlović	3	5

Semifinals
1	(Spain) R Nadal	3	2
4	(Russia) N Davydenko	6	6

=== Bottom half ===
First round
7	(Spain) G García-López	6	7^{7}
(Kazakhstan) M Kukushkin	1	6^{1}
(Germany) M Zverev	6^{4}	4
(Ukraine) I Marchenko	7^{7}	6
WC	(Ukraine) S Bubka	6	6
(Spain) D Gimeno-Traver	0	3
(Spain) R Ramírez Hidalgo	2	0
3	(France) J-W Tsonga	6	6
6	(Serbia) V Troicki	6	7
(Ukraine) S Stakhovsky	4	5
(Germany) R Schüttler	4	6^{2}
(Russia) T Gabashvili	6	7^{7}
WC	(Morocco) R El Amrani	6	6^{3}	3
Q	(Switzerland) M Chiudinelli	3	7^{7}	6
Q	(Netherlands) T Schoorel	6^{3}	3
2	(Switzerland) R Federer	7^{7}	6

Second round
7	(Spain) G García-López	6	6
(Ukraine) I Marchenko	1	4
WC	(Ukraine) S Bubka	2	4
3	(France) J-W Tsonga	6	6
6	(Serbia) V Troicki	6	6
(Russia) T Gabashvili	3	1
Q	(Switzerland) M Chiudinelli	6^{5}	5
2	(Switzerland) R Federer	7^{7}	7

Quarterfinals
7	(Spain) G García-López	6^{4}	6^{9}
3	(France) J-W Tsonga	7^{7}	7^{11}
6	(Serbia) V Troicki	2	2
2	(Switzerland) R Federer	6	6

Semifinals
3	(France) J-W Tsonga	3	6^{2}
2	(Switzerland) R Federer	6	7^{7}
