= 2013 Open 13 =

Coordinates: 43.2710°N 5.4010°E

- Date: 18–24 February
- Edition: 21st
- Category: ATP 250 Series
- Draw: 28S / 16D
- Prize money: €528,135
- Surface: Hard / indoors
- Location: Marseille, France

Champions

Singles
- (France) Jo-Wilfried Tsonga

Doubles
- (India) Rohan Bopanna / (United Kingdom) Colin Fleming
← 2012 ·	Open 13	· 2014 →

The 2013 Open 13 was a men's tennis tournament played on indoor hard courts. It was the 20th edition of the Open 13, and part of the ATP World Tour 250 series of the 2013 ATP World Tour. It took place at the Palais des Sports in Marseille, France, from 18 February through 24 February 2013. Third-seeded Jo-Wilfried Tsonga won the singles title.

== Singles main-draw entrants ==
=== Seeds ===
Country	Player	Rank^{1}	Seed
CZE	Tomáš Berdych	6	1
ARG	Juan Martín del Potro	7	2
FRA	Jo-Wilfried Tsonga	8	3
SRB	Janko Tipsarević	9	4
FRA	Richard Gasquet	10	5
FRA	Gilles Simon	14	6
POL	Jerzy Janowicz	26	7
SVK	Martin Kližan	31	8

- Rankings are as of February 11, 2013.

=== Other entrants ===
The following players received wildcards into the singles main draw:

- (Latvia) Ernests Gulbis
- (France) Gaël Monfils
- (France) Lucas Pouille

The following players received entry from the qualifying draw:

- (Serbia) Filip Krajinović
- (France) Édouard Roger-Vasselin
- (Ukraine) Sergiy Stakhovsky
- (Russia) Dmitry Tursunov

=== Withdrawals ===
Before the tournament

- (Romania) Victor Hănescu
- (Japan) Tatsuma Ito
- (Poland) Łukasz Kubot
- (France) Paul-Henri Mathieu
- (Czech Republic) Radek Štěpánek
- (Slovenia) Grega Žemlja

== Doubles main-draw entrants ==
=== Seeds ===
Country	Player	Country	Player	Rank^{1}	Seed
PAK	Aisam-ul-Haq Qureshi	NED	Jean-Julien Rojer	27	1
IND	Rohan Bopanna	GBR	Colin Fleming	38	2
AUT	Julian Knowle	SVK	Filip Polášek	62	3
FRA	Julien Benneteau	FRA	Michaël Llodra	110	4

- Rankings are as of February 11, 2013.

=== Other entrants ===
The following pairs received wildcards into the doubles main draw:

- (France) Maxime Chazal / (France) Martin Vaïsse
- (France) David Guez / (France) Josselin Ouanna

== Finals ==
=== Singles ===
- (France) Jo-Wilfried Tsonga defeated (Czech Republic) Tomáš Berdych, 3–6, 7–6^{(8–6)}, 6–4

=== Doubles ===
- (India) Rohan Bopanna / (United Kingdom) Colin Fleming defeated (Pakistan) Aisam-ul-Haq Qureshi / (Netherlands) Jean-Julien Rojer, 6–4, 7–6^{(7–3)}
