= 2015 Open 13 – Singles =

Singles
- 2015 Open 13

Final
- Champion: (France) Gilles Simon
- Runner-up: (France) Gaël Monfils
- Score: 6–4, 1–6, 7–6^{(7–4)}

Details
- Draw: 28 (4 Q / 3 WC )
- Seeds: 8

Events
| Singles | Doubles |
| ← 2014 · | Open 13 | · 2016 → |

Ernests Gulbis was the defending champion, but lost to Jérémy Chardy in the second round.

Gilles Simon won the title, defeating Gaël Monfils in the final, 6–4, 1–6, 7–6^{(7–4)}.

== Seeds ==
The top four seeds receive a bye into the second round.

1. (Canada) Milos Raonic (second round)
2. (Switzerland) Stan Wawrinka (quarterfinals)
3. (Latvia) Ernests Gulbis (second round)
4. (Spain) Roberto Bautista Agut (semifinals)
5. (France) Gilles Simon (champion)
6. (Belgium) David Goffin (second round, retired)
7. (France) Gaël Monfils (final)
8. (Czech Republic) Lukáš Rosol (first round)

== Draw ==
=== Key ===
- Q = Qualifier
- WC = Wild card
- LL = Lucky loser
- Alt = Alternate
- SE = Special exempt
- PR = Protected ranking
- ITF = ITF entry
- JE = Junior exempt
- w/o = Walkover
- r = Retired
- d = Defaulted
- SR = Special ranking

=== Finals ===
Semifinals
7/WC | (France) Gaël Monfils | 6 | 6
4 | (Spain) Roberto Bautista Agut | 4 | 2
5 | (France) Gilles Simon | 3 | 6 | 6
(Ukraine) Sergiy Stakhovsky | 6 | 3 | 2

Final
7/WC | (France) Gaël Monfils | 4 | 6 | 6^{4}
5 | (France) Gilles Simon | 6 | 1 | 7^{7}

=== Top half ===
First round
SE | (Italy) L Vanni | 4 | 6^{4}
(Italy) S Bolelli | 6 | 7^{7}
(Kazakhstan) A Golubev | 6 | 4 | 2
(Russia) A Kuznetsov | 3 | 6 | 6
Q | (Germany) A Zverev | 1 | 6^{12}
7/WC | (France) G Monfils | 6 | 7^{14}
(Netherlands) R Haase | 6 | 3 | 4
(Canada) V Pospisil | 4 | 6 | 6
(Austria) D Thiem | 7^{8} | 6
(Portugal) J Sousa | 6^{6} | 4
(Poland) J Janowicz | 4 | 2
6 | (Belgium) D Goffin | 6 | 6

Second round
1 | (Canada) M Raonic | 4 | 6 | 6^{3}
(Italy) S Bolelli | 6 | 3 | 7^{7}
(Russia) A Kuznetsov | 3 | 2
7/WC | (France) G Monfils | 6 | 6
4 | (Spain) R Bautista Agut | 7 | 6
(Canada) V Pospisil | 5 | 4
(Austria) D Thiem | 5
6 | (Belgium) D Goffin | 1^{r}

Quarterfinals
(Italy) S Bolelli | 4 | 4
7/WC | (France) G Monfils | 6 | 6
4 | (Spain) R Bautista Agut | 7^{9} | 6
(Austria) D Thiem | 6^{7} | 3

Semifinals
7/WC | (France) G Monfils | 6 | 6
4 | (Spain) R Bautista Agut | 4 | 2

=== Bottom half ===
First round
5 | (France) G Simon | 7 | 2
Q | (France) P-H Herbert | 5 | 0^{r}
WC | (Croatia) B Ćorić | 6 | 7
(Uzbekistan) D Istomin | 4 | 5
Q | (France) D Guez | 6 | 3 | 2
(France) J Chardy | 4 | 6 | 6
8 | (Czech Republic) L Rosol | 3 | 2
(Ukraine) S Stakhovsky | 6 | 6
(Germany) J-L Struff | 6 | 6^{6} | 7^{7}
Q | (France) N Mahut | 1 | 7^{8} | 6^{1}
(France) P-H Mathieu | 4 | 0^{r}
WC | (France) B Paire | 6 | 0

Second round
5 | (France) G Simon | 6 | 3 | 6
WC | (Croatia) B Ćorić | 2 | 6 | 3
(France) J Chardy | 6 | 6
3 | (Latvia) E Gulbis | 3 | 4
(Ukraine) S Stakhovsky | 6 | 4 | 6
(Germany) J-L Struff | 4 | 6 | 3
WC | (France) B Paire | 2 | 3
2 | (Switzerland) S Wawrinka | 6 | 6

Quarterfinals
5 | (France) G Simon | 7 | 7^{8}
(France) J Chardy | 5 | 6^{6}
(Ukraine) S Stakhovsky | 6 | 3 | 6
2 | (Switzerland) S Wawrinka | 4 | 6 | 4

Semifinals
5 | (France) G Simon | 3 | 6 | 6
(Ukraine) S Stakhovsky | 6 | 3 | 2

== Qualifying ==
=== Seeds ===
1. (Austria) Jürgen Melzer (first round)
2. (Turkey) Marsel İlhan (qualifying competition)
3. (France) Kenny de Schepper (qualifying competition)
4. (France) Nicolas Mahut (qualified)
5. (France) Pierre-Hugues Herbert (qualified)
6. (Slovakia) Norbert Gombos (second round)
7. (Germany) Alexander Zverev (qualified)
8. (Romania) Marius Copil (first round)

=== Qualifiers ===
1. (France) Pierre-Hugues Herbert
2. (Germany) Alexander Zverev
3. (France) David Guez
4. (France) Nicolas Mahut

=== Qualifying draw ===
==== First qualifier ====
First round
1 | (Austria) Jürgen Melzer | 3 | 6^{4}
Alt | (Croatia) Mate Pavić | 6 | 7^{7}
(France) Yannick Jankovits | 3 | 6 | 4
(United Kingdom) Joshua Milton | 6 | 4 | 6
(France) Martin Vaïsse | 4 | 1
WC | (Russia) Daniil Medvedev | 6 | 6
(United Kingdom) Marcus Willis | 6^{7} | 6^{2}
5 | (France) Pierre-Hugues Herbert | 7^{9} | 7^{7}

Second round
Alt | (Croatia) Mate Pavić | 3 | 6^{5}
(United Kingdom) Joshua Milton | 6 | 7^{7}
WC | (Russia) Daniil Medvedev | 4 | 3
5 | (France) Pierre-Hugues Herbert | 6 | 6

Qualifying competition
(United Kingdom) Joshua Milton | 4 | 1
5 | (France) Pierre-Hugues Herbert | 6 | 6

==== Second qualifier ====
First round
2 | (Turkey) Marsel İlhan | 6 | 6
(France) Maxime Teixeira | 4 | 4
(United Kingdom) Daniel Smethurst | 6 | 6
(France) Jonathan Eysseric | 4 | 3
WC | (France) Maxime Chazal | 2 | 4
(France) Tristan Lamasine | 6 | 6
(Georgia (country)) Nikoloz Basilashvili | 6^{5} | 3
7 | (Germany) Alexander Zverev | 7^{7} | 6

Second round
2 | (Turkey) Marsel İlhan | 6 | 7^{7}
(United Kingdom) Daniel Smethurst | 3 | 6^{3}
(France) Tristan Lamasine | 2 | 3
7 | (Germany) Alexander Zverev | 6 | 6

Qualifying competition
2 | (Turkey) Marsel İlhan | 3 | 6 | 1
7 | (Germany) Alexander Zverev | 6 | 3 | 6

==== Third qualifier ====
First round
3 | (France) Kenny de Schepper | 6 | 6
WC | (France) Théo Fournerie | 3 | 3
(Japan) Taro Daniel | w/o
(France) Enzo Couacaud
(France) David Guez | 6^{3} | 6 | 7^{7}
(Belarus) Uladzimir Ignatik | 7^{7} | 4 | 6^{3}
(France) Hugo Nys | 7^{7} | 1 | 6
8 | (Romania) Marius Copil | 6^{4} | 6 | 4

Second round
3 | (France) Kenny de Schepper | 7 | 6
(Japan) Taro Daniel | 5 | 3
(France) David Guez | 6 | 6
(France) Hugo Nys | 2 | 3

Qualifying competition
3 | (France) Kenny de Schepper | 2 | 6 | 3
(France) David Guez | 6 | 2 | 6

==== Fourth qualifier ====
First round
4 | (France) Nicolas Mahut | 7^{7} | 7
PR | (Spain) Andrés Artuñedo Martínavarro | 6^{2} | 5
(United Kingdom) Alexander Ward | 4 | 4
WC | (Germany) Mischa Zverev | 6 | 6
(France) Rémi Boutillier | 6 | 5 | 6
(Switzerland) Yann Marti | 2 | 7 | 3
(Italy) Flavio Cipolla | 0 | 3
6 | (Slovakia) Norbert Gombos | 6 | 6

Second round
4 | (France) Nicolas Mahut | 7^{7} | 6
WC | (Germany) Mischa Zverev | 6^{5} | 1
(France) Rémi Boutillier | 6 | 6^{5} | 7^{7}
6 | (Slovakia) Norbert Gombos | 2 | 7^{7} | 6^{5}

Qualifying competition
4 | (France) Nicolas Mahut | 6 | 7
(France) Rémi Boutillier | 3 | 5
