= 2011 Qatar Open =

- Date: 3–8 January 2011
- Edition: 19th
- Category: ATP World Tour 250 series
- Draw: 32S / 16D
- Prize money: $1,024,000
- Surface: Hard / outdoor
- Location: Doha, Qatar

Champions

Singles
- (Switzerland) Roger Federer

Doubles
- (Spain) Marc López / (Spain) Rafael Nadal
← 2010 ·	ATP Qatar Open	· 2012 →

The 2011 Qatar Open, known as the 2011 Qatar ExxonMobil Open for sponsorship reasons, was a men's tennis tournament played on outdoor hard courts. It was the 19th edition of the Qatar Open, and part of the ATP World Tour 250 series of the 2011 ATP World Tour. It took place at the Khalifa International Tennis Complex in Doha, Qatar, from 3 January through 8 January 2011. Roger Federer won the singles title.

== Finals ==
=== Singles ===
(Switzerland) Roger Federer defeated (Russia) Nikolay Davydenko, 6–3, 6–4

=== Doubles ===
(Spain) Marc López / (Spain) Rafael Nadal defeated (Italy) Daniele Bracciali / (Italy) Andreas Seppi, 6–3, 7–6^{(7–4)}

== Entrants ==
=== Seeds ===
Country	Player	Rank^{1}	Seed
ESP	Rafael Nadal	1	1
SUI	Roger Federer	2	2
FRA	Jo-Wilfried Tsonga	13	3
RUS	Nikolay Davydenko	22	4
LAT	Ernests Gulbis	24	5
SRB	Viktor Troicki	28	6
ESP	Guillermo García López	33	7
GER	Philipp Kohlschreiber	34	8

- Rankings are as of December 27, 2010.

=== Other entrants ===
The following players received wildcards into the singles main draw:

- (Ukraine) Sergey Bubka
- (Morocco) Reda El Amrani
- (Egypt) Sherif Sabry

The following players received entry from the qualifying draw:

- (Switzerland) Marco Chiudinelli
- (Czech Republic) Lukáš Rosol
- (Netherlands) Thomas Schoorel
- (Croatia) Antonio Veić
