= 2013 Open 13 – Doubles =

Doubles
- 2013 Open 13

Final
- Champions: (India) Rohan Bopanna (United Kingdom) Colin Fleming
- Runners-up: (Pakistan) Aisam-ul-Haq Qureshi (Netherlands) Jean-Julien Rojer
- Score: 6–4, 7–6^{(7–3)}

Events
Singles	Doubles
← 2012 ·	Open 13	· 2014 →

Nicolas Mahut and Édouard Roger-Vasselin were the defending champions, but they lost in the semifinals to Aisam-ul-Haq Qureshi and Jean-Julien Rojer.
Rohan Bopanna and Colin Fleming won the title, defeating Qureshi and Rojer in the final, 6–4, 7–6^{(7–3)}.

== Seeds ==
1. (Pakistan) Aisam-ul-Haq Qureshi / (Netherlands) Jean-Julien Rojer (final)
2. (India) Rohan Bopanna / (United Kingdom) Colin Fleming (champions)
3. (Austria) Julian Knowle / (Slovakia) Filip Polášek (semifinals)
4. (France) Julien Benneteau / (France) Michaël Llodra (first round)

== Draw ==
=== Key ===
- Q = Qualifier
- WC = Wild card
- LL = Lucky loser
- Alt = Alternate
- SE = Special exempt
- PR = Protected ranking
- ITF = ITF entry
- JE = Junior exempt
- w/o = Walkover
- r = Retired
- d = Defaulted
- SR = Special ranking

=== Draw ===
First round
1	(Pakistan) A-u-H Qureshi (Netherlands) J-J Rojer	6	6
(Germany) A Begemann (Germany) M Emmrich	4	2
(Thailand) Sa Ratiwatana (Thailand) So Ratiwatana	6	6
WC	(France) M Chazal (France) M Vaïsse	4	3
4	(France) J Benneteau (France) M Llodra	6	5	[7]
(France) N Mahut (France) É Roger-Vasselin	3	7	[10]
(Sweden) J Brunström (South Africa) R Klaasen	6^{5}	6^{6}
(United Kingdom) J Murray (Australia) J Peers	7^{7}	7^{8}
(Poland) J Janowicz (Denmark) F Nielsen	7	7
(United Kingdom) J Delgado (United Kingdom) K Skupski	5	5
WC	(France) D Guez (France) J Ouanna	2	2
3	(Austria) J Knowle (Slovakia) F Polášek	6	6
(United States) J Cerretani (Canada) A Shamasdin	6	6^{3}	[10]
(Poland) T Bednarek (Czech Republic) L Rosol	4	7^{7}	[7]
(Netherlands) R Haase (Belgium) D Norman	4	2
2	(India) R Bopanna (United Kingdom) C Fleming	6	6

Quarterfinals
1	(Pakistan) A-u-H Qureshi (Netherlands) J-J Rojer	6	6
(Thailand) Sa Ratiwatana (Thailand) So Ratiwatana	0	4
(France) N Mahut (France) É Roger-Vasselin	6	3	[12]
(United Kingdom) J Murray (Australia) J Peers	4	6	[10]
(Poland) J Janowicz (Denmark) F Nielsen	4	2
3	(Austria) J Knowle (Slovakia) F Polášek	6	6
(United States) J Cerretani (Canada) A Shamasdin	3	7^{7}	[7]
2	(India) R Bopanna (United Kingdom) C Fleming	6	6^{2}	[10]

Semifinals
1	(Pakistan) A-u-H Qureshi (Netherlands) J-J Rojer	6	6
(France) N Mahut (France) É Roger-Vasselin	3	1
3	(Austria) J Knowle (Slovakia) F Polášek	5	1
2	(India) R Bopanna (United Kingdom) C Fleming	7	6

Final
1	(Pakistan) A-u-H Qureshi (Netherlands) J-J Rojer	4	6^{3}
2	(India) R Bopanna (United Kingdom) C Fleming	6	7^{7}
