= 2012 Qatar Open – Singles =

Singles
- 2012 Qatar Open

Final
- Champion: (France) Jo-Wilfried Tsonga
- Runner-up: (France) Gaël Monfils
- Score: 7–5, 6–3

Details
- Draw: 32 (4 Q / 3 WC )
- Seeds: 8

Events
Singles	Doubles
- ATP Qatar Open

Roger Federer was the defending champion, but was forced to withdraw from the tournament before the semifinals because of a back injury. Following Federer's withdrawal, Stefan Edberg and Jo-Wilfried Tsonga played a one set exhibition match to make up the evening session.

Tsonga won the title beating Gaël Monfils in an all-French final, 7–5, 6–3.

== Seeds ==
1. (Spain) Rafael Nadal (semifinals)
2. (Switzerland) Roger Federer (semifinals, withdrew due to a back injury)
3. (France) Jo-Wilfried Tsonga (champion)
4. (France) Gaël Monfils (final)
5. (Serbia) Viktor Troicki (quarterfinals)
6. (Russia) Alex Bogomolov Jr. (second round, withdrew due to a right ankle injury)
7. (Russia) Mikhail Youzhny (quarterfinals)
8. (Italy) Andreas Seppi (quarterfinals)

== Draw ==
Key

- Q = Qualifier
- WC = Wild card
- LL = Lucky loser
- Alt = Alternate
- ITF = ITF entry
- PR = Protected ranking
- SR = Special ranking
- SE = Special exempt
- JE = Junior exempt
- JR = Junior Accelerator Programme entrant
- CO = College Accelerator Programme entrant
- NG = Next Gen Accelerator Program entrant
- w/o = Walkover
- r = Retired
- d = Defaulted

=== Finals ===
Semifinals
1	(Spain) Rafael Nadal	3	4
4	(France) Gaël Monfils	6	6
3	(France) Jo-Wilfried Tsonga	w/o
2	(Switzerland) Roger Federer

Final
4	(France) Gaël Monfils	5	3
3	(France) Jo-Wilfried Tsonga	7	6

=== Top half ===
First round
1	(Spain) R Nadal	6	6^{2}	6
(Germany) P Kohlschreiber	3	7^{7}	3
Q	(Germany) D Gremelmayr	6	6
(Italy) P Starace	3	2
(Ukraine) S Stakhovsky	7^{7}	2	6^{3}
(Croatia) I Karlović	6^{1}	6	7^{7}
(Latvia) E Gulbis	4	7^{7}	2
7	(Russia) M Youzhny	6	6^{4}	6
4	(France) G Monfils	7	6
(Portugal) R Machado	5	3
PR	(Germany) B Becker	6	7
(Russia) I Kunitsyn	4	5
Q	(Spain) R Bautista-Agut	3	4
Q	(Germany) M Bachinger	6	6
(Czech Republic) L Rosol	4	6^{4}
5	(Serbia) V Troicki	6	7^{7}

Second round
1	(Spain) R Nadal	6	6
Q	(Germany) D Gremelmayr	2	2
(Croatia) I Karlović	2	7^{7}	3
7	(Russia) M Youzhny	6	6^{3}	6
4	(France) G Monfils	7	4	7
PR	(Germany) B Becker	5	6	5
Q	(Germany) M Bachinger	6^{6}	1
5	(Serbia) V Troicki	7^{8}	6

Quarterfinals
1	(Spain) R Nadal	6	6
7	(Russia) M Youzhny	4	4
4	(France) G Monfils	6	6
5	(Serbia) V Troicki	2	3

Semifinals
1	(Spain) R Nadal	3	4
4	(France) G Monfils	6	6

=== Bottom half ===
First round
6	(Russia) A Bogomolov Jr.	5	6	6
(Italy) F Volandri	7	4	2
(Spain) A Ramos	7	6
(Russia) D Tursunov	5	2
WC	(Qatar) J Al Mutawa	0	0
(Italy) F Cipolla	6	6
WC	(Tunisia) M Jaziri	6^{5}	7^{7}	1
3	(France) J-W Tsonga	7^{7}	6^{5}	6
8	(Italy) A Seppi	6	6
(Poland) Ł Kubot	2	3
(Spain) P Andújar	2	6	3
(Spain) G García-López	6	2	6
WC	(Ukraine) S Bubka	6	1	1
Q	(Slovenia) G Žemlja	4	6	6
(Russia) N Davydenko	2	2
2	(Switzerland) R Federer	6	6

Second round
6	(Russia) A Bogomolov Jr.
(Spain) A Ramos	w/o
(Italy) F Cipolla	6^{8}	3
3	(France) J-W Tsonga	7^{10}	6
8	(Italy) A Seppi	7	6
(Spain) G García-López	5	3
Q	(Slovenia) G Žemlja	2	3
2	(Switzerland) R Federer	6	6

Quarterfinals
(Spain) A Ramos	2	1
3	(France) J-W Tsonga	6	6
8	(Italy) A Seppi	3	7	4
2	(Switzerland) R Federer	6	5	6

Semifinals
3	(France) J-W Tsonga	w/o
2	(Switzerland) R Federer

== Qualifying ==
=== Seeds ===
1. (Germany) Matthias Bachinger (qualified)
2. (Turkey) Marsel İlhan (second round)
3. (Slovakia) Lukáš Lacko (second round)
4. (Slovenia) Grega Žemlja (qualified)
5. (Slovakia) Martin Kližan (first round)
6. (Germany) Rainer Schüttler (qualifying competition)
7. (Kazakhstan) Andrey Golubev (qualifying competition)
8. (Germany) Björn Phau (second round)

=== Qualifiers ===
1. (Germany) Matthias Bachinger
2. (Germany) Denis Gremelmayr
3. (Spain) Roberto Bautista-Agut
4. (Slovenia) Grega Žemlja

=== Draw ===
Key

- Q = Qualifier
- WC = Wild card
- LL = Lucky loser
- Alt = Alternate
- ITF = ITF entry
- PR = Protected ranking
- SR = Special ranking
- SE = Special exempt
- JE = Junior exempt
- JR = Junior Accelerator Programme entrant
- CO = College Accelerator Programme entrant
- NG = Next Gen Accelerator Program entrant
- w/o = Walkover
- r = Retired
- d = Defaulted

==== First qualifier ====
First round
1	(Germany) Matthias Bachinger	7^{7}	3	6
(Austria) Martin Fischer	6^{2}	6	3
(Kazakhstan) Yuri Schukin	6	4	1
(Slovenia) Aljaž Bedene	4	6	6
WC	(Kuwait) Mohammed Ghareeb	6	6
WC	(Qatar) Abdulrahman Al Harib	0	2
(Chinese Taipei) Yang Tsung-hua	6	4	3
7	(Kazakhstan) Andrey Golubev	1	6	6

Second round
1	(Germany) Matthias Bachinger	6	1	6
(Slovenia) Aljaž Bedene	3	6	3
WC	(Kuwait) Mohammed Ghareeb	2	5
7	(Kazakhstan) Andrey Golubev	6	7

Qualifying competition
1	(Germany) Matthias Bachinger	6	4	6
7	(Kazakhstan) Andrey Golubev	4	6	4

==== Second qualifier ====
First round
2	(Turkey) Marsel İlhan	4	6	6
(Germany) Andre Begemann	6	2	3
(Switzerland) Marco Chiudinelli	6^{3}	2
(Germany) Denis Gremelmayr	7^{7}	6
(Romania) Marius Copil	5	4
(Croatia) Antonio Veić	7	6
(Belgium) Maxime Authom	6^{5}	6	4
6	(Germany) Rainer Schüttler	7^{7}	2	6

Second round
2	(Turkey) Marsel İlhan	1	6	4
(Germany) Denis Gremelmayr	6	3	6
(Croatia) Antonio Veić	3	6^{4}
6	(Germany) Rainer Schüttler	6	7^{7}

Qualifying competition
(Germany) Denis Gremelmayr	7	6
6	(Germany) Rainer Schüttler	5	4

==== Third qualifier ====
First round
3	(Slovakia) Lukáš Lacko	7^{7}	6
(Germany) Mischa Zverev	6^{1}	3
(Ukraine) Illya Marchenko	0	4
(Netherlands) Igor Sijsling	6	6
(Germany) Peter Torebko	4	3
(Spain) Roberto Bautista-Agut	6	6
(Germany) Dustin Brown	4	6	0
8	(Germany) Björn Phau	6	4	6

Second round
3	(Slovakia) Lukáš Lacko	5	5
(Netherlands) Igor Sijsling	7	7
(Spain) Roberto Bautista-Agut	6	7
8	(Germany) Björn Phau	1	5

Qualifying competition
(Netherlands) Igor Sijsling	3	4
(Spain) Roberto Bautista-Agut	6	6

==== Fourth qualifier ====
First round
4	(Slovenia) Grega Žemlja	7^{7}	6
(Russia) Konstantin Kravchuk	6^{1}	4
WC	(Kuwait) Abdullah Maqdas	1	6^{4}
(Germany) Dominik Meffert	6	7^{7}
WC	(Qatar) Mousa Sayed	0	0
(United Kingdom) James Ward	6	6
(Netherlands) Jesse Huta Galung	6	6
5	(Slovakia) Martin Kližan	2	3

Second round
4	(Slovenia) Grega Žemlja	6	7
(Germany) Dominik Meffert	3	5
(United Kingdom) James Ward	6^{7}	3
(Netherlands) Jesse Huta Galung	7^{9}	6

Qualifying competition
4	(Slovenia) Grega Žemlja	6	6
(Netherlands) Jesse Huta Galung	2	1
