= 2015 Open 13 =

Coordinates: 43.2710°N 5.4010°E

- Date: 16–22 February
- Edition: 23rd
- Category: ATP 250 Series
- Draw: 28S / 16D
- Prize money: €565,735
- Surface: Hard / indoors
- Location: Marseille, France
- Venue: Palais des Sports de Marseille

Champions

Singles
- (France) Gilles Simon

Doubles
- (Croatia) Marin Draganja / (Finland) Henri Kontinen
- Open 13

The 2015 Open 13 was a men's tennis tournament played on indoor hard courts. It was the 22nd edition of the Open 13, and part of the ATP World Tour 250 series of the 2015 ATP World Tour. It took place at the Palais des Sports in Marseille, France, from 16 February through 22 February 2015. Fifth-seeded Gilles Simon won the singles title.

== Finals ==
=== Singles ===
- (France) Gilles Simon defeated (France) Gaël Monfils, 6–4, 1–6, 7–6^{(7–4)}

=== Doubles ===
- (Croatia) Marin Draganja / (Finland) Henri Kontinen defeated (United Kingdom) Colin Fleming / (United Kingdom) Jonathan Marray, 6–4, 3–6, [10–8]

== Points and prize money ==
=== Point distribution ===
Event	W	F	SF	QF	Round of 16	Round of 32	Q	Q3	Q2	Q1
Singles	250	150	90	45	20	0	12	6	0	0
Doubles	250	150	90	45	0	—N/a	—N/a	—N/a	—N/a	—N/a

=== Prize money ===
Event	W	F	SF	QF	Round of 16	Round of 32	Q3	Q2	Q1
Singles	€102,900	€54,200	€29,360	€16,730	€9,855	€5,840	€940	€450	€0
Doubles	€31,260	€16,430	€8,910	€5,100	€2,980	—N/a	—N/a	—N/a	—N/a
Doubles prize money per team

== Singles main-draw entrants ==
=== Seeds ===
Country	Player	Rank^{1}	Seed
CAN	Milos Raonic	6	1
SUI	Stan Wawrinka	8	2
LAT	Ernests Gulbis	13	3
ESP	Roberto Bautista Agut	16	4
FRA	Gilles Simon	19	5
BEL	David Goffin	20	6
FRA	Gaël Monfils	21	7
CZE	Lukáš Rosol	29	8

- Rankings are as of February 9, 2015.

=== Other entrants ===
The following players received wildcards into the main draw:

- (Croatia) Borna Ćorić
- (France) Gaël Monfils
- (France) Benoît Paire

The following player received entry as a special exempt:

- (Italy) Luca Vanni

The following players received entry from the qualifying draw:

- (France) David Guez
- (France) Pierre-Hugues Herbert
- (France) Nicolas Mahut
- (Germany) Alexander Zverev

=== Withdrawals ===
Before the tournament

- (France) Julien Benneteau → replaced by Jan-Lennard Struff
- (Spain) Guillermo García López → replaced by Andrey Golubev
- (France) Richard Gasquet → replaced by Andrey Kuznetsov
- (Australia) Nick Kyrgios (back injury) → replaced by Sergiy Stakhovsky
- (Luxembourg) Gilles Müller → replaced by Robin Haase

=== Retirements ===
- (Belgium) David Goffin (back pain)
- (France) Pierre-Hugues Herbert (right shoulder injury)
- (France) Paul-Henri Mathieu (stomach illness)

== Doubles main-draw entrants ==
=== Seeds ===
Country	Player	Country	Player	Rank^{1}	Seed
FRA	Pierre-Hugues Herbert	FRA	Nicolas Mahut	47	1
CRO	Marin Draganja	FIN	Henri Kontinen	72	2
GBR	Jamie Murray	AUS	John Peers	73	3
GER	Andre Begemann	NED	Robin Haase	100	4

- ^{1} Rankings are as of February 9, 2015.

=== Other entrants ===
The following pairs received wildcards into the main draw:

- (Chinese Taipei) Hsieh Cheng-peng / (Chinese Taipei) Lee Hsin-han
- (Germany) Alexander Zverev / (Germany) Mischa Zverev

=== Withdrawals ===
During the tournament

- (France) Pierre-Hugues Herbert (right shoulder injury)
