= 2012 Qatar Open =

- Date: 2–7 January 2012
- Edition: 20th
- Category: ATP World Tour 250 series
- Draw: 32S / 16D
- Prize money: $1,024,000
- Surface: Hard / outdoor
- Location: Doha, Qatar

Champions

Singles
- (France) Jo-Wilfried Tsonga

Doubles
- (Slovakia) Filip Polášek / (Czech Republic) Lukáš Rosol
← 2011 ·	ATP Qatar Open	· 2013 →

The 2012 Qatar Open (also known as 2012 Qatar ExxonMobil Open for sponsorship reasons) was a men's tennis tournament played on outdoor hard courts. It was the 20th edition of the Qatar Open, and part of the ATP World Tour 250 series of the 2012 ATP World Tour. It took place at the Khalifa International Tennis and Squash Complex in Doha, Qatar, from January 2 through January 7, 2012. Jo-Wilfried Tsonga won the singles title.

== Finals ==
=== Singles ===
(France) Jo-Wilfried Tsonga defeated (France) Gaël Monfils 7–5, 6–3

- It was Tsonga's 1st title of the year and 8th of his career.

=== Doubles ===
(Slovakia) Filip Polášek / (Czech Republic) Lukáš Rosol defeated (Germany) Christopher Kas / (Germany) Philipp Kohlschreiber 6–3, 6–4

== Singles main-draw entrants ==
=== Seeds ===
Country	Player	Rank	Seed
ESP	Rafael Nadal	2	1
SUI	Roger Federer	3	2
FRA	Jo-Wilfried Tsonga	6	3
FRA	Gaël Monfils	15	4
SRB	Viktor Troicki	21	5
RUS	Alex Bogomolov Jr.	34	6
RUS	Mikhail Youzhny	35	7
ITA	Andreas Seppi	38	8

- Rankings are as of December 26, 2011

=== Other entrants ===
The following players received wild cards:

- (Qatar) Jabor Al Mutawa
- (Ukraine) Sergei Bubka
- (Tunisia) Malek Jaziri

The following players received entry from the qualifying draw:

- (Germany) Matthias Bachinger
- (Germany) Denis Gremelmayr
- (Spain) Roberto Bautista Agut
- (Slovenia) Grega Žemlja

=== Retirements ===
The following players retire from the singles main draw:

- (Russia) Alex Bogomolov Jr. (right ankle injury)
- (Switzerland) Roger Federer (back injury)

== Doubles main-draw entrants ==
=== Seeds ===
Country	Player	Country	Player	Rank^{1}	Seed
GBR	Colin Fleming	GBR	Ross Hutchins	76	1
USA	James Cerretani	BEL	Dick Norman	94	2
ITA	Daniele Bracciali	ITA	Potito Starace	95	3
UKR	Sergiy Stakhovsky	RUS	Mikhail Youzhny	107	4

- Rankings are as of December 26, 2011

=== Other entrants ===
The following pairs received wildcards into the doubles main draw:

- (Qatar) Jabor Al Mutawa / (Kuwait) Mohammed Ghareeb
- (Egypt) Sherif Sabry / (Egypt) Mohamed Safwat

=== Retirements ===
- (Russia) Alex Bogomolov Jr. (right ankle injury)
