= 2015 Open 13 – Doubles =

Doubles
- 2015 Open 13

Final
- Champions: (Croatia) Marin Draganja (Finland) Henri Kontinen
- Runners-up: (United Kingdom) Colin Fleming (United Kingdom) Jonathan Marray
- Score: 6–4, 3–6, [10–8]

Events
Singles	Doubles
← 2014 ·	Open 13	· 2016 →

Julien Benneteau and Édouard Roger-Vasselin were the defending champions, but did not participate due to Benneteau's injury.

Marin Draganja and Henri Kontinen won the title, defeating Colin Fleming and Jonathan Marray in the final, 6–4, 3–6, [10–8].

== Seeds ==
1. (France) Pierre-Hugues Herbert / (France) Nicolas Mahut (quarterfinals, withdrew)
2. (Croatia) Marin Draganja / (Finland) Henri Kontinen (champion)
3. (United Kingdom) Jamie Murray / (Australia) John Peers (first round)
4. (Germany) Andre Begemann / (Netherlands) Robin Haase (first round)

== Draw ==
=== Key ===
- Q = Qualifier
- WC = Wild card
- LL = Lucky loser
- Alt = Alternate
- SE = Special exempt
- PR = Protected ranking
- ITF = ITF entry
- JE = Junior exempt
- w/o = Walkover
- r = Retired
- d = Defaulted
- SR = Special ranking

=== Draw ===
First round
1	(France) P-H Herbert (France) N Mahut	6	7^{7}
(Italy) S Bolelli (Germany) J-L Struff	3	6^{4}
(United Kingdom) C Fleming (United Kingdom) J Marray	3	6	[11]
WC	(Chinese Taipei) C-p Hsieh (Chinese Taipei) H-h Lee	6	3	[9]
3	(United Kingdom) J Murray (Australia) J Peers	5	7^{9}	[7]
(Kazakhstan) A Golubev (Uzbekistan) D Istomin	7	6^{7}	[10]
(Czech Republic) L Rosol (Austria) D Thiem	6^{3}	7^{7}	[10]
(Germany) G Kretschmer (Germany) A Satschko	7^{7}	6^{3}	[6]
(United Kingdom) K Skupski (United Kingdom) N Skupski	6	6
(Israel) J Erlich (Croatia) M Pavić	4	3
(Australia) R Junaid (Canada) A Shamasdin	3	6	[10]
4	(Germany) A Begemann (Netherlands) R Haase	6	4	[8]
(Germany) M Emmrich (Sweden) A Siljeström	7^{7}	6
(New Zealand) M Daniell (New Zealand) A Sitak	6^{0}	3
WC	(Germany) A Zverev (Germany) M Zverev	6	5	[7]
2	(Croatia) M Draganja (Finland) H Kontinen	2	7	[10]

Quarterfinals
1	(France) P-H Herbert (France) N Mahut
(United Kingdom) C Fleming (United Kingdom) J Marray	w/o
(Kazakhstan) A Golubev (Uzbekistan) D Istomin	6	4	[8]
(Czech Republic) L Rosol (Austria) D Thiem	4	6	[10]
(United Kingdom) K Skupski (United Kingdom) N Skupski	4	6^{7}
(Australia) R Junaid (Canada) A Shamasdin	6	7^{9}
(Germany) M Emmrich (Sweden) A Siljeström	7^{7}	3	[7]
2	(Croatia) M Draganja (Finland) H Kontinen	6^{4}	6	[10]

Semifinals
(United Kingdom) C Fleming (United Kingdom) J Marray	4	6	[10]
(Czech Republic) L Rosol (Austria) D Thiem	6	3	[4]
(Australia) R Junaid (Canada) A Shamasdin	3	7^{7}	[5]
2	(Croatia) M Draganja (Finland) H Kontinen	6	6^{4}	[10]

Final
(United Kingdom) C Fleming (United Kingdom) J Marray	4	6	[8]
2	(Croatia) M Draganja (Finland) H Kontinen	6	3	[10]
