= 2010 Qatar Open – Singles =

Tennis event results

Singles
- 2010 Qatar Open

Final
- Champion: (Russia) Nikolay Davydenko
- Runner-up: (Spain) Rafael Nadal
- Score: 0–6, 7–6^{(10–8)}, 6–4

Details
- Draw: 32 (4 Q / 3 WC )
- Seeds: 8

Events
Singles	Doubles
- ATP Qatar Open

Nikolay Davydenko defeated Rafael Nadal in the final, 0–6, 7–6^{(10–8)}, 6–4, saving two championship points in the 2nd set tiebreak.

Andy Murray was the defending champion, but chose not to participate this year.

== Seeds ==
1. (Switzerland) Roger Federer (semifinals)
2. (Spain) Rafael Nadal (final)
3. (Russia) Nikolay Davydenko (champion)
4. (Russia) Mikhail Youzhny (first round)
5. (Serbia) Viktor Troicki (semifinals)
6. (Spain) Albert Montañés (first round)
7. (Croatia) Ivo Karlović (quarterfinals)
8. (Spain) Guillermo García-López (first round)

== Draw ==
Key

- Q = Qualifier
- WC = Wild card
- LL = Lucky loser
- Alt = Alternate
- ITF = ITF entry
- PR = Protected ranking
- SR = Special ranking
- SE = Special exempt
- JE = Junior exempt
- JR = Junior Accelerator Programme entrant
- CO = College Accelerator Programme entrant
- NG = Next Gen Accelerator Program entrant
- w/o = Walkover
- r = Retired
- d = Defaulted

=== Finals ===
Semifinals
1	(Switzerland) Roger Federer	4	4
3	(Russia) Nikolay Davydenko	6	6
5	(Serbia) Viktor Troicki	1	3
2	(Spain) Rafael Nadal	6	6

Final
3	(Russia) Nikolay Davydenko	0	7^{10}	6
2	(Spain) Rafael Nadal	6	6^{8}	4

=== Top half ===
First round
1	(Switzerland) R Federer	6	6
(Belgium) C Rochus	1	2
(Kazakhstan) E Korolev	6	6
(Argentina) M Argüello	2	3
(Spain) Ó Hernández	4	5
(Italy) A Seppi	6	7
(Latvia) E Gulbis	6	7
6	(Spain) A Montañés	2	5
3	(Russia) N Davydenko	6	6
Q	(Kazakhstan) M Kukushkin	2	0
(Italy) P Lorenzi	5	3
(Switzerland) M Chiudinelli	7	6
(Austria) D Köllerer	1^{r}
Q	(Germany) B Becker	5
(Italy) F Fognini	4	4
7	(Croatia) I Karlović	6	6

Second round
1	(Switzerland) R Federer	6	6
(Kazakhstan) E Korolev	2	4
(Italy) A Seppi	4	5
(Latvia) E Gulbis	6	7
3	(Russia) N Davydenko	6	6
(Switzerland) M Chiudinelli	3	4
Q	(Germany) B Becker	6	3	2
7	(Croatia) I Karlović	4	6	6

Quarterfinals
1	(Switzerland) R Federer	6	4	6
(Latvia) E Gulbis	2	6	4
3	(Russia) N Davydenko	7^{7}	7^{9}
7	(Croatia) I Karlović	6^{4}	6^{7}

Semifinals
1	(Switzerland) R Federer	4	4
3	(Russia) N Davydenko	6	6

=== Bottom half ===
First round
5	(Serbia) V Troicki	6	7
(Spain) D Gimeno-Traver	1	5
(Belgium) O Rochus	6	6
WC	(Qatar) A Haji	1	0
WC	(Egypt) K Maamoun	0	2
(Poland) Ł Kubot	6	6
(Ukraine) S Stakhovsky	7^{13}	6
4	(Russia) M Youzhny	6^{11}	2
8	(Spain) G García-López	4	1
Q	(Belgium) S Darcis	6	6
Q	(United States) R DeHeart	6^{3}	6^{4}
WC	(Morocco) Y El Aynaoui	7^{7}	7^{7}
(Portugal) F Gil	2	0
(Italy) P Starace	6	6
(Italy) S Bolelli	3	3
2	(Spain) R Nadal	6	6

Second round
5	(Serbia) V Troicki	6	6
(Belgium) O Rochus	2	2
(Poland) Ł Kubot	6	7^{7}
(Ukraine) S Stakhovsky	2	6^{5}
Q	(Belgium) S Darcis	6	6
WC	(Morocco) Y El Aynaoui	3	1
(Italy) P Starace	2	2
2	(Spain) R Nadal	6	6

Quarterfinals
5	(Serbia) V Troicki	4	6	7^{7}
(Poland) Ł Kubot	6	4	6^{1}
Q	(Belgium) S Darcis	1	0^{r}
2	(Spain) R Nadal	6	2

Semifinals
5	(Serbia) V Troicki	1	3
2	(Spain) R Nadal	6	6

== Qualifying ==
=== Seeds ===
1. (Germany) Benjamin Becker (qualified)
2. (Slovakia) Karol Beck (qualifying competition)
3. (Belgium) Steve Darcis (qualified)
4. (Kazakhstan) Mikhail Kukushkin (qualified)
5. (Austria) Stefan Koubek (qualifying competition)
6. (Andorra) Laurent Recouderc (second round)
7. (France) Thierry Ascione (first round)
8. (Spain) Albert Ramos Viñolas (second round)

=== Qualifiers ===
1. (Germany) Benjamin Becker
2. (United States) Ryler DeHeart
3. (Belgium) Steve Darcis
4. (Kazakhstan) Mikhail Kukushkin

=== Draw ===
==== First qualifier ====
First round
1	(Germany) Benjamin Becker	6	4	6
(South Africa) Izak van der Merwe	2	6	2
WC	(Qatar) Hamad Al Mulla	0	1
(Poland) Michał Przysiężny	6	6
(Slovakia) Ivo Klec	4	5
(Austria) Martin Fischer	6	7
(Ukraine) Sergei Bubka	7^{7}	7^{7}
7	(France) Thierry Ascione	6^{5}	6^{5}

Second round
1	(Germany) Benjamin Becker	4	7^{7}	6
(Poland) Michał Przysiężny	6	6^{2}	4
(Austria) Martin Fischer	7	7
(Ukraine) Sergei Bubka	5	5

Qualifying competition
1	(Germany) Benjamin Becker	7^{8}	6
(Austria) Martin Fischer	6^{6}	4

==== Second qualifier ====
First round
2	(Slovakia) Karol Beck	6	6
(Finland) Henri Kontinen	1	2
(Spain) Marc López	6	6
WC	(Kuwait) Mohammad Ghareeb	2	1
(Argentina) Federico Delbonis	6^{2}	7^{7}	3
(United States) Ryler DeHeart	7^{7}	6^{2}	6
WC	(Egypt) Amir El-Bayoumy	1	0
6	(Andorra) Laurent Recouderc	6	6

Second round
2	(Slovakia) Karol Beck	w/o
(Spain) Marc López
(United States) Ryler DeHeart	5	6	6
6	(Andorra) Laurent Recouderc	7	3	4

Qualifying competition
2	(Slovakia) Karol Beck	4	3
(United States) Ryler DeHeart	6	6

==== Third qualifier ====
First round
3	(Belgium) Steve Darcis	7^{7}	6
(Croatia) Ivan Dodig	6^{3}	3
(United Kingdom) Dan Evans	4	7^{7}	7
(Ukraine) Ivan Sergeyev	6	6^{4}	5
(Republic of Ireland) Conor Niland	7^{7}	7^{7}
(Belgium) Dick Norman	6^{2}	6^{4}
(Croatia) Antonio Veić	1	6	2
8	(Spain) Albert Ramos Viñolas	6	3	6

Second round
3	(Belgium) Steve Darcis	6	6
(United Kingdom) Dan Evans	3	3
(Republic of Ireland) Conor Niland	6	6
8	(Spain) Albert Ramos Viñolas	3	2

Qualifying competition
3	(Belgium) Steve Darcis	1	6	7^{7}
(Republic of Ireland) Conor Niland	6	1	6^{4}

==== Fourth qualifier ====
First round
4	(Kazakhstan) Mikhail Kukushkin	7^{7}	6
(Morocco) Reda El Amrani	6^{5}	4
WC	(Kuwait) Abdullah Maqdes	4	2
(Serbia) Goran Tošić	6	6
(Tunisia) Malek Jaziri	6^{5}	4
(Austria) Philipp Oswald	7^{7}	6
(Switzerland) Michael Lammer	6^{1}	2
5	(Austria) Stefan Koubek	7^{7}	6

Second round
4	(Kazakhstan) Mikhail Kukushkin	6	6
(Serbia) Goran Tošić	4	1
(Austria) Philipp Oswald	3	4
5	(Austria) Stefan Koubek	6	6

Qualifying competition
4	(Kazakhstan) Mikhail Kukushkin	6	6
5	(Austria) Stefan Koubek	2	4
