= 2010 Qatar Open – Doubles =

Doubles
- 2010 Qatar Open

Final
- Champions: (Spain) Guillermo García López; (Spain) Albert Montañés
- Runners-up: (Czech Republic) František Čermák; (Slovakia) Michal Mertiňák
- Score: 6–4, 7–5

Details
- Draw: 16
- Seeds: 4

Events
Singles	Doubles
← 2009 ·	ATP Qatar Open	· 2011 →

Marc López and Rafael Nadal were the defending champions, but lost in the first round to Mariusz Fyrstenberg and Marcin Matkowski.

Guillermo García López and Albert Montañés defeated František Čermák and Michal Mertiňák in the final, 6–4, 7–5.

== Seeds ==
1. (Canada) Daniel Nestor / (Serbia) Nenad Zimonjić (first round)
2. (Czech Republic) František Čermák / (Slovakia) Michal Mertiňák (final)
3. (Poland) Mariusz Fyrstenberg / (Poland) Marcin Matkowski (quarterfinals)
4. (Germany) Christopher Kas / (Belgium) Dick Norman (semifinals)

== Draw ==
=== Key ===
- Q = Qualifier
- WC = Wild card
- LL = Lucky loser
- Alt = Alternate
- SE = Special exempt
- PR = Protected ranking
- ITF = ITF entry
- JE = Junior exempt
- w/o = Walkover
- r = Retired
- d = Defaulted
- SR = Special ranking

=== Draw ===
First round

Quarterfinals

Semifinals

Finals

1
- (Canada) D Nestor
- (Serbia) N Zimonjić
4
4

(Spain) G García López
(Spain) A Montañés
6
6

(Spain) G García López
(Spain) A Montañés
6
2
[10]

(South Africa) W Moodie
(Russia) M Youzhny
6
6

- (South Africa) W Moodie
- (Russia) M Youzhny
2
6
[6]

WC
- (Morocco) Y El Aynaoui
- (Qatar) A Al-Haji
2
0

(Spain) G García López
(Spain) A Montañés
6^{5}
6
[14]

4
(Germany) C Kas
(Belgium) D Norman
6
3
[10]

4
- (Germany) C Kas
- (Belgium) D Norman
7^{7}
3
[12]

- (Italy) S Bolelli
- (Italy) A Seppi
3
6
[6]

4
(Germany) C Kas
(Belgium) D Norman
6
5
[10]

(Switzerland) M Chiudinelli
(Serbia) V Troicki
6
6

- (Switzerland) M Chiudinelli
- (Serbia) V Troicki
1
7
[5]

- (Germany) B Becker
- (Belgium) O Rochus
3
3

(Spain) G García López
(Spain) A Montañés
6
7

- (Italy) F Fognini
- (Italy) P Starace
2
7^{11}
[7]

2
- (Czech Republic) F Čermák
- (Slovakia) M Mertiňák
4
5

(Russia) E Korolev
(Ukraine) S Stakhovsky
6
6^{9}
[10]

(Russia) E Korolev
(Ukraine) S Stakhovsky
6^{6}
6
[10]

- (Spain) M López
- (Spain) R Nadal
6
2
[3]

3
- (Poland) M Fyrstenberg
- (Poland) M Matkowski
7^{8}
2
[8]

3
(Poland) M Fyrstenberg
(Poland) M Matkowski
4
6
[10]

- (Russia) E Korolev
- (Ukraine) S Stakhovsky
6
1
[5]

(Belgium) S Darcis
(Poland) Ł Kubot
6
6

2
(Czech Republic) F Čermák
(Slovakia) M Mertiňák
3
6
[10]

- (Portugal) F Gil
- (Spain) Ó Hernández
2
0

- (Belgium) S Darcis
- (Poland) Ł Kubot
6
6^{6}
[9]

WC
- (Morocco) R El Amrani
- (Kuwait) M Ghareeb
0
0

2
(Czech Republic) F Čermák
(Slovakia) M Mertiňák
4
7^{8}
[11]

2
(Czech Republic) F Čermák
(Slovakia) M Mertiňák
6
6
