= 2011 Qatar Open – Doubles =

Doubles
- 2011 Qatar Open

Final
- Champions: (Spain) Marc López; (Spain) Rafael Nadal
- Runners-up: (Italy) Daniele Bracciali; (Italy) Andreas Seppi
- Score: 6–3, 7–6^{(7–4)}

Details
- Draw: 16
- Seeds: 4

Events
Singles	Doubles
← 2010 ·	ATP Qatar Open	· 2012 →

Guillermo García López and Albert Montañés were the defending champions, but only García López chose to participate this year. He played with Rainer Schüttler. However, they lost to Marco Chiudinelli and Jo-Wilfried Tsonga already in the first round.
3rd seeds Marc López and Rafael Nadal won this event, by defeating Daniele Bracciali and Andreas Seppi 6–3, 7–6^{(7–4)} in the final.

== Seeds ==
1. (Serbia) Viktor Troicki / (Serbia) Nenad Zimonjić (first round)
2. (Czech Republic) František Čermák / (Germany) Christopher Kas (quarterfinals)
3. (Spain) Marc López / (Spain) Rafael Nadal (champions)
4. (Slovakia) Filip Polášek / (Ukraine) Sergiy Stakhovsky (quarterfinals)

== Draw ==
=== Key ===
- Q = Qualifier
- WC = Wild card
- LL = Lucky loser
- Alt = Alternate
- SE = Special exempt
- PR = Protected ranking
- ITF = ITF entry
- JE = Junior exempt
- w/o = Walkover
- r = Retired
- d = Defaulted
- SR = Special ranking

=== Draw ===
First round

Quarterfinals

Semifinals

Final

1
- (Serbia) V Troicki
- (Serbia) N Zimonjić
4
7^{7}
[5]

- (Russia) T Gabashvili
- (Germany) P Kohlschreiber
6
6^{2}
[10]

(Russia) T Gabashvili
(Germany) P Kohlschreiber
7^{7}
7

- (Switzerland) M Chiudinelli
- (France) J-W Tsonga
6
6

- (Switzerland) M Chiudinelli
- (France) J-W Tsonga
6^{3}
5

- (Spain) G García López
- (Germany) R Schüttler
1
2

- (Russia) T Gabashvili
- (Germany) P Kohlschreiber
4
4

3
- (Spain) M López
- (Spain) R Nadal
6
7

3
- (Spain) M López
- (Spain) R Nadal
6
6

- (Spain) D Marrero
- (Spain) P Riba
3
5

3
(Spain) M López
(Spain) R Nadal
6
6

WC
- (Kuwait) M Ghareeb
- (Qatar) M Zaid
4
7^{7}
[11]

WC
- (Kuwait) M Ghareeb
- (Qatar) M Zaid
2
0

WC
- (Morocco) R El Amrani
- (Qatar) A El Harib
6
6^{5}
[9]

3
(Spain) M López
(Spain) R Nadal
6
7^{7}

- (Latvia) E Gulbis
- (Germany) M Zverev
5
6
[5]

- (Italy) D Bracciali
- (Italy) A Seppi
3
6^{4}

- (Italy) F Fognini
- (Slovakia) I Zelenay
7
3
[10]

(Italy) F Fognini
(Slovakia) I Zelenay
6
6

- (Sweden) J Brunström
- (Finland) J Nieminen
3
6^{3}

4
- (Slovakia) F Polášek
- (Ukraine) S Stakhovsky
2
4

4
(Slovakia) F Polášek
(Ukraine) S Stakhovsky
6
7^{7}

- (Italy) F Fognini
- (Slovakia) I Zelenay
1
6
[9]

- (Spain) D Gimeno–Traver
- (Spain) R Ramírez Hidalgo
2
3

- (Italy) D Bracciali
- (Italy) A Seppi
6
4
[11]

- (Italy) D Bracciali
- (Italy) A Seppi
6
6

(Italy) D Bracciali
(Italy) A Seppi
6
6

- (Poland) M Fyrstenberg
- (Romania) V Hănescu
2
2

2
- (Czech Republic) F Čermák
- (Germany) C Kas
1
4

2
- (Czech Republic) F Čermák
- (Germany) C Kas
6
6
