= 2014 Open 13 – Doubles =

Doubles
- 2014 Open 13

Final
- Champions: (France) Julien Benneteau (France) Édouard Roger-Vasselin
- Runners-up: (Australia) Paul Hanley (United Kingdom) Jonathan Marray
- Score: 4–6, 7–6^{(8–6)}, [13–11]

Events
| Singles | Doubles |
| ← 2013 · | Open 13 | · 2015 → |

Rohan Bopanna and Colin Fleming were the defending champions, but Bopanna chose not to participate. Fleming played alongside Ross Hutchins, but lost in the quarterfinals to Marin Draganja and Mate Pavić.
Julien Benneteau and Édouard Roger-Vasselin won the title, defeating Paul Hanley and Jonathan Marray in the final, 4–6, 7–6^{(8–6)}, [13–11].

== Seeds ==
1. (France) Michaël Llodra / (France) Nicolas Mahut (withdrew because of Llodra's left groin injury)
2. (France) Julien Benneteau / (France) Édouard Roger-Vasselin (champions)
3. (Sweden) Johan Brunström / (Austria) Julian Knowle (first round)
4. (Netherlands) Jesse Huta Galung / (Australia) John Peers (first round)

== Draw ==
=== Key ===
- Q = Qualifier
- WC = Wild card
- LL = Lucky loser
- Alt = Alternate
- SE = Special exempt
- PR = Protected ranking
- ITF = ITF entry
- JE = Junior exempt
- w/o = Walkover
- r = Retired
- d = Defaulted
- SR = Special ranking

=== Draw ===
First round
Alt | (United States) J Cerretani (Canada) A Shamasdin | 7^{7} | 7^{7}
WC | (France) P-H Herbert (France) A Olivetti | 6^{5} | 6^{5}
(Australia) P Hanley (United Kingdom) J Marray | 6 | 6
WC | (Chinese Taipei) H-h Lee (Chinese Taipei) C-f Wang | 4 | 3
3 | (Sweden) J Brunström (Austria) J Knowle | 6^{1} | 3
PR | (United Kingdom) C Fleming (United Kingdom) R Hutchins | 7^{7} | 6
(Croatia) M Draganja (Croatia) M Pavić | 7^{8} | 6^{4} | [10]
(Australia) R Junaid (Germany) P Marx | 6^{6} | 7^{7} | [8]
(Israel) J Erlich (Slovakia) M Mertiňák | 7^{8} | 3 | 5
(Germany) G Kretschmer (Germany) A Satschko | 6^{6} | 6 | [10]
(Germany) D Brown (United States) A Krajicek | 3 | 7^{7} | [10]
4 | (Netherlands) J Huta Galung (Australia) J Peers | 6 | 6^{4} | [6]
(Finland) H Kontinen (Poland) M Kowalczyk | 7^{7} | 4 | [10]
(United Kingdom) K Skupski (United Kingdom) N Skupski | 6^{3} | 6 | [2]
(Italy) M Cecchinato (Italy) A Seppi | 6^{8} | 1
2 | (France) J Benneteau (France) É Roger-Vasselin | 7^{10} | 6

Quarterfinals
Alt | (United States) J Cerretani (Canada) A Shamasdin | 4 | 6^{3}
(Australia) P Hanley (United Kingdom) J Marray | 6 | 7^{7}
PR | (United Kingdom) C Fleming (United Kingdom) R Hutchins | 6 | 6^{9} | [8]
(Croatia) M Draganja (Croatia) M Pavić | 3 | 7^{11} | [10]
(Germany) G Kretschmer (Germany) A Satschko | 6 | 6
(Germany) D Brown (United States) A Krajicek | 3 | 2
(Finland) H Kontinen (Poland) M Kowalczyk | 4 | 4
2 | (France) J Benneteau (France) É Roger-Vasselin | 6 | 6

Semifinals
(Australia) P Hanley (United Kingdom) J Marray | 6 | 4 | [10]
(Croatia) M Draganja (Croatia) M Pavić | 2 | 6 | [5]
(Germany) G Kretschmer (Germany) A Satschko | 1 | 5
2 | (France) J Benneteau (France) É Roger-Vasselin | 6 | 7

Final
(Australia) P Hanley (United Kingdom) J Marray | 6 | 6^{6} | [11]
2 | (France) J Benneteau (France) É Roger-Vasselin | 4 | 7^{8} | [13]
