= 2014 Open 13 – Singles =

Singles
- 2014 Open 13

Final
- Champion: (Latvia) Ernests Gulbis
- Runner-up: (France) Jo-Wilfried Tsonga
- Score: 7–6^{(7–5)}, 6–4

Details
- Draw: 28 (4 Q / 3 WC )
- Seeds: 8

Events
Singles	Doubles
- Open 13

Jo-Wilfried Tsonga was the defending champion, but lost in the final to Ernests Gulbis 6–7^{(5–7)}, 4–6.

== Seeds ==
The top four seeds receive a bye into the second round.

1. (France) Richard Gasquet (semifinals)
2. (France) Jo-Wilfried Tsonga (final)
3. (Latvia) Ernests Gulbis (champion)
4. (Italy) Andreas Seppi (second round)
5. (Croatia) Ivan Dodig (quarterfinals)
6. (France) Édouard Roger-Vasselin (quarterfinals)
7. (France) Julien Benneteau (second round)
8. (France) Nicolas Mahut (quarterfinals)

== Draw ==
Key

- Q = Qualifier
- WC = Wild card
- LL = Lucky loser
- Alt = Alternate
- ITF = ITF entry
- PR = Protected ranking
- SR = Special ranking
- SE = Special exempt
- JE = Junior exempt
- JR = Junior Accelerator Programme entrant
- CO = College Accelerator Programme entrant
- NG = Next Gen Accelerator Program entrant
- w/o = Walkover
- r = Retired
- d = Defaulted

=== Finals ===
Semifinals
1	(France) Richard Gasquet	3	2
3	(Latvia) Ernests Gulbis	6	6
(Germany) Jan-Lennard Struff	6^{4}	5
2	(France) Jo-Wilfried Tsonga	7^{7}	7

Final
3	(Latvia) Ernests Gulbis	7^{7}	6
2	(France) Jo-Wilfried Tsonga	6^{5}	4

=== Top half ===
First round
(Slovenia) B Kavčič	6	6
WC	(Australia) T Kokkinakis	4	2
(Germany) T Kamke	7	6
WC	(United Kingdom) K Edmund	5	1
WC	(France) A Olivetti	5	2
5	(Croatia) I Dodig	7	6
(Germany) D Brown	5	6	3
(Spain) R Bautista Agut	7	4	6
(Czech Republic) J Hájek	5^{r}
Q	(Lithuania) R Berankis	6
(France) K de Schepper	6^{2}	3
8	(France) N Mahut	7^{7}	6

Second round
1	(France) R Gasquet	6	6
(Slovenia) B Kavčič	3	3
(Germany) T Kamke	7^{7}	0	3
5	(Croatia) I Dodig	6^{4}	6	6
3	(Latvia) E Gulbis	6	5	6
(Spain) R Bautista Agut	3	7	4
Q	(Lithuania) R Berankis	6^{5}	3
8	(France) N Mahut	7^{7}	6

Quarterfinals
1	(France) R Gasquet	7	6
5	(Croatia) I Dodig	5	3
3	(Latvia) E Gulbis	6	7^{7}
8	(France) N Mahut	3	6^{1}

Semifinals
1	(France) R Gasquet	3	2
3	(Latvia) E Gulbis	6	6

=== Bottom half ===
First round
7	(France) J Benneteau	6	6
(Netherlands) J Huta Galung	1	4
Q	(France) D Guez	6	1	1
(Germany) J-L Struff	3	6	6
(Slovakia) L Lacko	3	6^{2}
(France) M Llodra	6	7^{7}
6	(France) É Roger-Vasselin	3	7^{7}	7
Q	(Croatia) A Pavić	6	6^{5}	5
(Ukraine) S Stakhovsky	3	7^{7}	6
Q	(United Kingdom) D Evans	6	6^{4}	4
(Russia) N Davydenko	6	6
(Netherlands) I Sijsling	4	4

Second round
7	(France) J Benneteau	6	6^{3}	3
(Germany) J-L Struff	4	7^{7}	6
(France) M Llodra	7^{7}	6
4	(Italy) A Seppi	6^{3}	4
6	(France) É Roger-Vasselin	7^{7}	6
(Ukraine) S Stakhovsky	6^{2}	4
(Russia) N Davydenko	6^{4}	6^{8}
2	(France) J-W Tsonga	7^{7}	7^{10}

Quarterfinals
(Germany) J-L Struff	6	6
(France) M Llodra	4	3
6	(France) É Roger-Vasselin	7^{7}	2	2
2	(France) J-W Tsonga	6^{3}	6	6

Semifinals
(Germany) J-L Struff	6^{4}	5
2	(France) J-W Tsonga	7^{7}	7

== Qualifying ==
=== Seeds ===
1. (Romania) Adrian Ungur (second round)
2. (United Kingdom) Daniel Evans (qualified)
3. (Bosnia and Herzegovina) Damir Džumhur (second round)
4. (Lithuania) Ričardas Berankis (qualified)
5. (France) Guillaume Rufin (first round)
6. (Italy) Marco Cecchinato (first round)
7. (France) David Guez (qualified)
8. (United Kingdom) James Ward (qualifying competition)

=== Qualifiers ===
1. (France) David Guez
2. (United Kingdom) Daniel Evans
3. (Croatia) Ante Pavić
4. (Lithuania) Ričardas Berankis

=== Qualifying draw ===
==== First qualifier ====
First round
1	(Romania) Adrian Ungur	6	6
(France) Martin Vaïsse	1	1
WC	(France) Jonathan Hilaire	6	2	3
(Netherlands) Thomas Schoorel	3	6	6
(Switzerland) Yann Marti	6	7^{7}
(Monaco) Benjamin Balleret	4	6^{3}
(Morocco) Lamine Ouahab	3	6	2
7	(France) David Guez	6	3	6

Second round
1	(Romania) Adrian Ungur	3	4
(Netherlands) Thomas Schoorel	6	6
(Switzerland) Yann Marti	1	6	3
7	(France) David Guez	6	3	6

Qualifying competition
(Netherlands) Thomas Schoorel	2	2
7	(France) David Guez	6	6

==== Second qualifier ====
First round
2	(United Kingdom) Daniel Evans	6	7^{7}
(Slovakia) Norbert Gombos	4	6^{2}
(Italy) Roberto Marcora	7	6
WC	(France) Maxime Tchoutakian	5	4
(Switzerland) Adrien Bossel	4	6	6
WC	(Chinese Taipei) Wang Chieh-fu	6	1	2
(Switzerland) Henri Laaksonen	4	6	6
5	(France) Guillaume Rufin	6	3	3

Second round
2	(United Kingdom) Daniel Evans	6^{2}	6	6
(Italy) Roberto Marcora	7^{7}	3	4
(Switzerland) Adrien Bossel	3	4
(Switzerland) Henri Laaksonen	6	6

Qualifying competition
2	(United Kingdom) Daniel Evans	6	6
(Switzerland) Henri Laaksonen	2	4

==== Third qualifier ====
First round
3	(Bosnia and Herzegovina) Damir Džumhur	3	6	7^{7}
(France) Florent Serra	6	3	6^{3}
(Croatia) Ante Pavić	2	6	7^{7}
(Belgium) Olivier Rochus	6	2	6^{5}
(Croatia) Mate Pavić	6	0
(France) Josselin Ouanna	3	0^{r}
(Bosnia and Herzegovina) Mirza Bašić	7^{7}	6
6	(Italy) Marco Cecchinato	6^{0}	3

Second round
3	(Bosnia and Herzegovina) Damir Džumhur	3	3
(Croatia) Ante Pavić	6	6
(Croatia) Mate Pavić	6^{1}	2
(Bosnia and Herzegovina) Mirza Bašić	7^{7}	6

Qualifying competition
(Croatia) Ante Pavić	6	6
(Bosnia and Herzegovina) Mirza Bašić	1	2

==== Fourth qualifier ====
First round
4	(Lithuania) Ričardas Berankis	6	6
WC	(France) Calvin Hemery	1	3
(Poland) Grzegorz Panfil	6	0	6^{6}
(France) Maxime Teixeira	4	6	7^{8}
(Italy) Lorenzo Giustino	7^{7}	6
(France) Tak Khunn Wang	6^{3}	4
(France) Maxime Chazal	2	4
8	(United Kingdom) James Ward	6	6

Second round
4	(Lithuania) Ričardas Berankis	6	6
(France) Maxime Teixeira	1	4
(Italy) Lorenzo Giustino	4	2
8	(United Kingdom) James Ward	6	6

Qualifying competition
4	(Lithuania) Ričardas Berankis	7	6
8	(United Kingdom) James Ward	5	3
