= 2012 Qatar Open – Doubles =

Doubles
- 2012 Qatar Open

Final
- Champions: (Slovakia) Filip Polášek (Czech Republic) Lukáš Rosol
- Runners-up: (Germany) Christopher Kas (Germany) Philipp Kohlschreiber
- Score: 6–3, 6–4

Details
- Draw: 16
- Seeds: 4

Events
Singles	Doubles
- ATP Qatar Open

Marc López and Rafael Nadal were the defending champions but Nadal decided not to participate. López played alongside Albert Ramos, but the pair was defeated in the second round by Dmitry Tursunov and Nenad Zimonjić.

Filip Polášek and Lukáš Rosol defeated Christopher Kas and Philipp Kohlschreiber in the final with a score of 6–3, 6–4 to win their first title in Doha.

== Seeds ==
1. (United Kingdom) Colin Fleming / (United Kingdom) Ross Hutchins (first round)
2. (United States) James Cerretani / (Belgium) Dick Norman (first round)
3. (Italy) Daniele Bracciali / (Italy) Potito Starace (quarterfinals)
4. (Ukraine) Sergiy Stakhovsky / (Russia) Mikhail Youzhny (first round)

== Draw ==
Key

- Q = Qualifier
- WC = Wild card
- LL = Lucky loser
- Alt = Alternate
- ITF = ITF entry
- PR = Protected ranking
- SR = Special ranking
- SE = Special exempt
- JE = Junior exempt
- JR = Junior Accelerator Programme entrant
- CO = College Accelerator Programme entrant
- NG = Next Gen Accelerator Program entrant
- w/o = Walkover
- r = Retired
- d = Defaulted

=== Draw ===
First round
1	(United Kingdom) C Fleming (United Kingdom) R Hutchins	6	4	[10]
(Germany) C Kas (Germany) P Kohlschreiber	2	6	[12]
(Russia) A Bogomolov Jr. (Russia) I Kunitsyn	4	7^{7}	[10]
(Croatia) I Karlović (Germany) F Moser	6	6^{2}	8
3	(Italy) D Bracciali (Italy) P Starace	6	7
(Germany) D Brown (France) J-W Tsonga	1	5
(Poland) Ł Kubot (Serbia) V Troicki	4	7	[6]
(Italy) F Cipolla (Italy) A Seppi	6	5	[10]
WC	(Egypt) S Sabry (Egypt) M Safwat	6^{6}	5
(Slovakia) F Polášek (Czech Republic) L Rosol	7^{8}	7
(Spain) P Andújar (Spain) G García López	6	3	[10]
4	(Ukraine) S Stakhovsky (Russia) M Youzhny	2	6	[6]
(Spain) M López (Spain) A Ramos	6	6
WC	(Qatar) J Al Mutawa (Kuwait) M Ghareeb	2	1
(Russia) D Tursunov (Serbia) N Zimonjić	6	6
2	(United States) J Cerretani (Belgium) D Norman	1	4

Quarterfinals
(Germany) C Kas (Germany) P Kohlschreiber	w/o
(Russia) A Bogomolov Jr. (Russia) I Kunitsyn
3	(Italy) D Bracciali (Italy) P Starace	3	5
(Italy) F Cipolla (Italy) A Seppi	6	7
(Slovakia) F Polášek (Czech Republic) L Rosol	6	7
(Spain) P Andújar (Spain) G García López	3	5
(Spain) M López (Spain) A Ramos	3	3
(Russia) D Tursunov (Serbia) N Zimonjić	6	6

Semifinals
(Germany) C Kas (Germany) P Kohlschreiber	6	6
(Italy) F Cipolla (Italy) A Seppi	3	2
(Slovakia) F Polášek (Czech Republic) L Rosol	6	3	[13]
(Russia) D Tursunov (Serbia) N Zimonjić	2	6	[11]

Final
(Germany) C Kas (Germany) P Kohlschreiber	3	4
(Slovakia) F Polášek (Czech Republic) L Rosol	6	6
