= 2014 Open 13 =

Coordinates: 43.2710°N 5.4010°E

- Date: 17–23 February
- Edition: 22nd
- Category: ATP 250 Series
- Draw: 28S / 16D
- Prize money: €549,260
- Surface: Hard / indoors
- Location: Marseille, France

Champions

Singles
- (Latvia) Ernests Gulbis

Doubles
- (France) Julien Benneteau / (France) Édouard Roger-Vasselin
- Open 13

The 2014 Open 13 was a men's tennis tournament played on indoor hard courts. It was the 21st edition of the Open 13, and part of the ATP World Tour 250 series of the 2014 ATP World Tour. It took place at the Palais des Sports in Marseille, France, from 17 February through 23 February 2014. Third-seeded Ernests Gulbis won the singles title.

== Finals ==
=== Singles ===
- (Latvia) Ernests Gulbis defeated (France) Jo-Wilfried Tsonga, 7–6^{(7–5)}, 6–4

=== Doubles ===
- (France) Julien Benneteau / (France) Édouard Roger-Vasselin defeated (Australia) Paul Hanley / (United Kingdom) Jonathan Marray, 4–6, 7–6^{(8–6)}, [13–11]

== Singles main-draw entrants ==
=== Seeds ===
Country	Player	Rank^{1}	Seed
FRA	Richard Gasquet	9	1
FRA	Jo-Wilfried Tsonga	10	2
LAT	Ernests Gulbis	24	3
ITA	Andreas Seppi	31	4
CRO	Ivan Dodig	33	5
FRA	Édouard Roger-Vasselin	35	6
FRA	Julien Benneteau	39	7
FRA	Nicolas Mahut	44	8

- Rankings were as of February 10, 2014.

=== Other entrants ===
The following players received wildcards into the singles main draw:

- (United Kingdom) Kyle Edmund
- (Australia) Thanasi Kokkinakis
- (France) Albano Olivetti

The following players received entry from the qualifying draw:

- (Lithuania) Ričardas Berankis
- (United Kingdom) Daniel Evans
- (France) David Guez
- (Croatia) Ante Pavić

=== Withdrawals ===
Before the tournament

- (Czech Republic) Tomáš Berdych
- (Uzbekistan) Denis Istomin
- (Poland) Jerzy Janowicz
- (Poland) Łukasz Kubot
- (France) Gaël Monfils
- (Poland) Michał Przysiężny (back injury)
- (Canada) Milos Raonic
- (Switzerland) Stanislas Wawrinka

== Doubles main-draw entrants ==
=== Seeds ===
Country	Player	Country	Player	Rank^{1}	Seed
~~FRA~~	~~Michaël Llodra~~	~~FRA~~	~~Nicolas Mahut~~	~~45~~	~~1~~
FRA	Julien Benneteau	FRA	Édouard Roger-Vasselin	49	2
SWE	Johan Brunström	AUT	Julian Knowle	82	3
NED	Jesse Huta Galung	AUS	John Peers	115	4

- Rankings were as of February 10, 2014.

=== Other entrants ===
The following pairs received wildcards into the doubles main draw:

- (France) Pierre-Hugues Herbert / (France) Albano Olivetti
- (Chinese Taipei) Lee Hsin-han / (Chinese Taipei) Wang Chieh-fu

The following pair received entry as alternates:

- (United States) James Cerretani / (Canada) Adil Shamasdin

=== Withdrawals ===
- (France) Michaël Llodra (left groin injury)
