= 2010 Qatar Open =

- Date: 4–9 January 2010
- Edition: 18th
- Category: ATP World Tour 250 series
- Draw: 28S / 16D
- Prize money: $1,024,000
- Surface: Hard / outdoor
- Location: Doha, Qatar
- Venue: Khalifa International Tennis Complex

Champions

Singles
- (Russia) Nikolay Davydenko

Doubles
- (Spain) Guillermo García López / (Spain) Albert Montañés
- ATP Qatar Open

The 2010 Qatar Open, known as the 2010 Qatar ExxonMobil Open for sponsorship reasons, was a men's tennis tournament played on outdoor hard courts. It was the 18th edition of the Qatar ExxonMobil Open, and part of the ATP World Tour 250 series of the 2010 ATP World Tour. It took place at the Khalifa International Tennis Complex in Doha, Qatar, from 4 January through 9 January 2010. Third-seeded Nikolay Davydenko won the singles title.

== Finals ==
=== Singles ===
(Russia) Nikolay Davydenko defeated (Spain) Rafael Nadal, 0–6, 7–6^{(10–8)}, 6–4

- It was Davydenko's first title of the year and 20th overall.

=== Doubles ===
(Spain) Guillermo García López / (Spain) Albert Montañés defeated (Czech Republic) František Čermák / (Slovakia) Michal Mertiňák, 6–4, 7–5

== Entrants ==
=== Seeds ===
Country	Player	Rank^{1}	Seed
SUI	Roger Federer	1	1
ESP	Rafael Nadal	2	2
RUS	Nikolay Davydenko	6	3
RUS	Mikhail Youzhny	19	4
SRB	Viktor Troicki	29	5
ESP	Albert Montañés	31	6
CRO	Ivo Karlović	37	7
ESP	Guillermo García López	41	8

=== Other entrants ===
The following players received wildcards into the singles main draw:

- (Morocco) Younes El Aynaoui
- (Qatar) Abdulla Hajji
- (Egypt) Karim Maamoun

The following players received entry from the qualifying draw:

- (Germany) Benjamin Becker
- (Belgium) Steve Darcis
- (United States) Ryler DeHeart
- (Kazakhstan) Mikhail Kukushkin
