= Nikolay Davydenko =

Russian tennis player (born 1981)

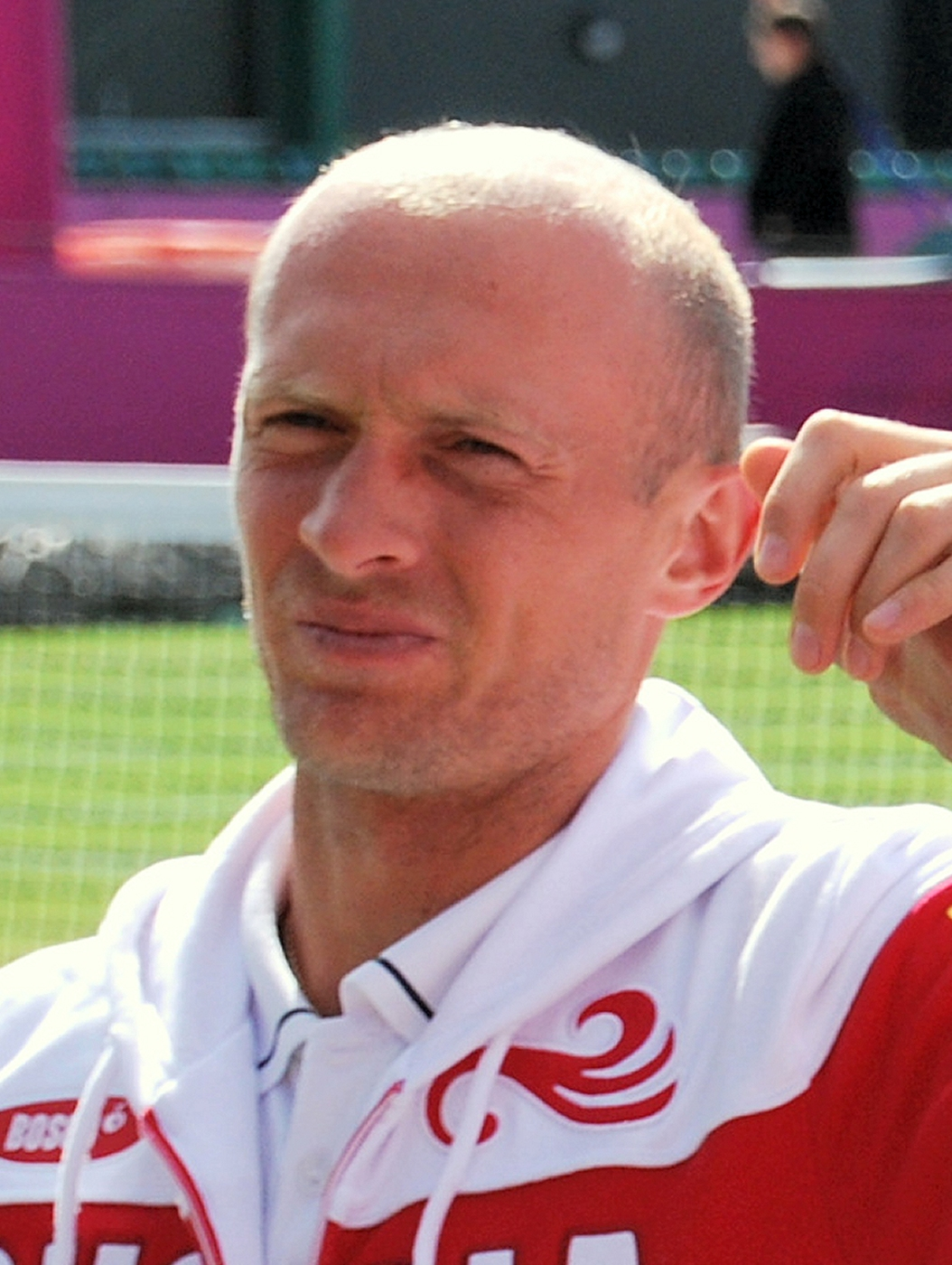
- Davydenko at the 2012 Olympics
- Native name: Николай Давыденко
- Country (sports): Russia
- Residence: Volgograd, Russia
- Born: June 2, 1981 (age 45) Sievierodonetsk, Ukrainian SSR, Soviet Union
- Height: 1.78 m (5 ft 10 in)
- Turned pro: 1999
- Retired: 2014
- Plays: Right-handed (two-handed backhand)
- Coach: Eduard Davydenko
- Prize money: US$16,186,480: 45th all-time leader in earnings

Singles
- Career record: 482–329 (59.3%)
- Career titles: 21
- Highest ranking: No. 3 (6 November 2006)

Grand Slam singles results
- Australian Open: QF (2005, 2006, 2007, 2010)
- French Open: SF (2005, 2007)
- Wimbledon: 4R (2007)
- US Open: SF (2006, 2007)

Other tournaments
- Tour Finals: W (2009)
- Olympic Games: 2R (2008, 2012)

Doubles
- Career record: 61–67 (47.7%)
- Career titles: 2
- Highest ranking: No. 31 (13 June 2005)

Grand Slam doubles results
- Australian Open: 2R (2005)
- French Open: 3R (2005)
- Wimbledon: QF (2004)
- US Open: 2R (2004, 2005)

Team competitions
- Davis Cup: W (2006)
- Last updated on: 29 September 2014.

Nikolay Vladimirovich Davydenko (Russian: Никола́й Влади́мирович Давыде́нко; born 2 June 1981) is a Russian former professional tennis player. He achieved a career-high singles ranking of World No. 3 in November 2006. Davydenko's best result in a Grand Slam tournament was reaching the semi-finals, which he accomplished on four occasions: twice each at the French Open and the U.S. Open, losing to Roger Federer in all but one of them. He is regarded as the greatest player in men's tennis history not to have contested a Grand Slam final. His biggest achievement was winning the 2009 ATP World Tour Finals, and he also won three ATP Masters Series. In mid-October 2014 Davydenko retired from playing professionally.

== Personal life ==
Nikolay was born on June 2, 1981, in Sievierodonetsk, at that time Severodonetsk, Ukrainian SSR, Soviet Union, in the family of Vladimir and Tatiana Davydenko. He started playing tennis at the age of 7 with his brother Eduard, nine years his senior. At the age of 11, he left his hometown for the Russian city of Volgograd. The initiator of the departure was his brother Eduard who worked as a children's tennis coach in Volgograd at that time. He motivated his brother's move by the fact Nikolay's professional growth at home was impossible. Four years later, in 1996, the brothers decided to move to Salmtal, Rhineland-Palatinate, Germany for the same reasons.

I had been living in Russia for four years, constantly training under the guidance of Eduard who wasn't giving me any respite. Then we left for Germany. An old acquaintance of ours was living there and he has convinced my brother it would be better for me. In [old] Europe, I could play more tournaments and make more money than in Russia.

The brothers had lived in Germany for three years and then applied for German citizenship but the German Tennis Federation did not support the application, and as a result, they returned to Russia. In 1999, at the age of 18, Nikolay changed his Ukrainian citizenship (granted at 14 by default) to the Russian one. In 2007, he applied for Austrian citizenship (so as to obtain dual citizenship), unsuccessfully. He was motivated by the difficulties obtaining travel visa with the Russian passport. And he wasn't given one because a sports minister in Austria was against while the other local authorities seemed to approve it. According to Davydenko, the Austrian minister said: "It's too soon".

He and his wife Irina, a former model (m. 2006), have three children, an older daughter named Ekaterina (born 2012) and two sons — Konstantin (b. 2015) and Dmitry (b. 2017). His nephew Philipp is a former professional tennis player and ATP/WTA coach. Davydenko speaks Russian as a native language, German as his second one, and English.

In 2024, Davydenko – having lost to doping cheat Mariano Puerta in the 2005 French Open semifinals – commented that he was 'physically dead' during the match, whilst Puerta was fresh; but that he did not know whether doping was the source of Puerta's elevated stamina.

== Tennis career ==
=== Early career ===
Davydenko started playing at the age of seven with his brother, Eduard. During his junior tennis years, he moved to Salmtal, Germany with Eduard to further improve and participate in more tournaments.

Davydenko turned professional in 1999. In 2000, he played mainly on the Futures Tour, where he captured one title and reached three finals. He made his ATP debut at Amsterdam, reaching the semifinal. Later in August, he won his first Challenger title in Mönchengladbach.

=== 2001–2003 ===
Davydenko made his Grand Slam debut in 2001 at the Australian Open, where he made it to the second round, before losing to former world no. 1, Patrick Rafter in four sets. This performance captured the public eye for his talent and ability. Later in February, he injured his lower back in Dallas and was out for six weeks. After the injury, he came back to win two Challenger titles in Ulm and Istanbul. He finished the season with a quarterfinal showing in Basel.

In 2002, Davydenko continued to play on both the ATP Tour and in Challenger events. It was a steady year with quarterfinal appearances in Båstad and Vienna. During the year, he captured his fourth Challenger title in Szczecin.

Davydenko made huge strides on the ATP Tour in 2003. He opened the season with his first ATP title in Adelaide, defeating Kristof Vliegen in the final. A few months later, he captured his second tour title in Estoril on clay, beating Agustín Calleri. His season was backed up with solid performances on clay in Barcelona and St. Pölten, reaching the quarterfinal and final, respectively. After a solid year, Davydenko finished in the top 50 for the first time in his career.

=== 2004: Breakthrough ===
His progress continued in 2004, capturing two more titles for the second consecutive year. After a slow start to season, a quarterfinal in the Monte Carlo Masters kicked off a 10–2 matches run. A week later, he won his third title in Munich. He backed up his win by reaching the semifinal in Stuttgart, losing to Guillermo Cañas. In October, he captured his first home-soil victory in Moscow by winning both the singles and doubles (partnering Igor Andreev). He finished the season in the top 30 for the first time.

=== 2005–2009: Peak years ===
==== 2005 ====
In 2005, he began the season by reaching the quarterfinals for the first time in a Grand Slam at the Australian Open. During the clay season, he captured his fifth career title in St. Pölten, beating home favourite, Jürgen Melzer. He continued his solid form by reaching the semifinals of the Hamburg Masters and his first semifinal of a Grand Slam at the French Open. In the fourth round of the French Open, he upset one of the tournament favourites and the previous year's runner-up, Guillermo Coria in four sets. This win showed just how far Davydenko had come in the last year, as Coria had beaten Davydenko with the loss of just six games in the 2004 French Open first round.

Davydenko lost in the semifinals of the 2005 French Open to Mariano Puerta in five close sets. Davydenko reached the top 10 for the first time after the 2005 French Open. He closed out the year by reaching the quarterfinals at the Cincinnati Masters and the Paris Masters. After a great season, he qualified for the Tennis Masters Cup in Shanghai for the first time and reached the semifinals, losing to David Nalbandian. He finished the year as the no. 1 Russian and world no. 5.

==== 2006 ====
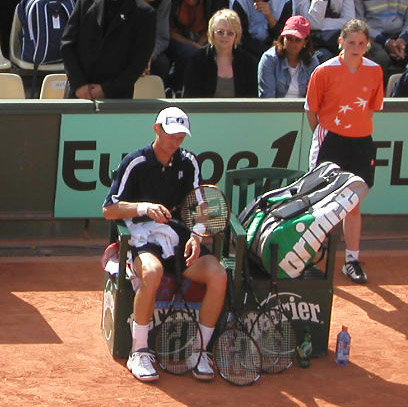
Davydenko at the 2006 French Open.

After his rapid rise into the top 5 in 2005, Davydenko continued to stay in the top 5 for 2006. He repeated his quarterfinal appearance at the Australian Open, losing to Roger Federer in four tight sets. He had another solid clay-court season, reaching the final in Estoril and the quarterfinal, at the Hamburg Masters. He defended his title in Pöertschach and reached the quarterfinal at the French Open for the second year. His form continued after an early loss at Wimbledon with wins in Sopot and his first American win in New Haven. He reached his second Grand Slam semifinal at the U.S. Open, losing to Roger Federer. He finished the season with a win in Moscow and his first career TMS title in Paris. After getting married, Davydenko helped Russia win the Davis Cup against Argentina. He reached a career-high ranking of no. 3, with which he finished the year.

==== 2007 ====
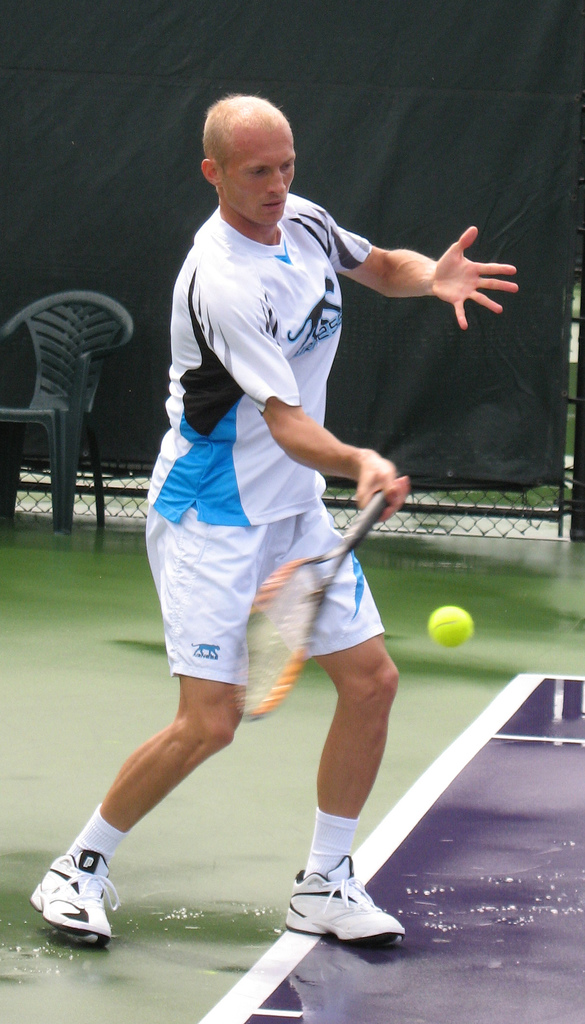
Nikolay Davydenko practicing at the 2007 Miami Masters.

2007 started with another quarterfinal appearance at the Australian Open for the third consecutive year. He was slow to find his form in the clay court season, but finally did at the Rome Masters, losing in the semifinal to Rafael Nadal in an enthralling match. His good form continued, and he reached the semifinals for the second time at the French Open, losing to Roger Federer again, in straight sets. At Wimbledon, he surprised the tennis world by reaching the fourth round on his least preferred surface. Moving to the hard-court season in the US, Davydenko had strong showings in the Canada Masters and the Cincinnati Masters, reaching the quarterfinals and semifinals, respectively. Davydenko then reached the semifinals of the U.S. Open for the second consecutive year, before losing to Roger Federer in straight sets. He won his eleventh career title in Moscow, defeating Paul-Henri Mathieu. In November, he took part in the Masters Cup, which took place in Shanghai, China. He played in the Red group round robin, losing to eventual champion Roger Federer 2:0 sets, losing to Andy Roddick 2:1 sets, and beating Fernando Gonzales 2:0 sets, thus finishing 3rd in the group, meaning he did not reach the knockout stage. Davydenko ended the year ranked no. 4 and in the top 5 for the third straight year.

==== 2008 ====
Davydenko started 2008 at the Australian Open, where he was seeded fourth. He won his first three matches in straight sets, but in the fourth round he lost to countryman Mikhail Youzhny in straight sets. In Dubai, he reached the semifinals, losing to Feliciano López in three sets. He then went on to win his biggest career title to date at the Miami Masters. En route to the win, he defeated Andy Roddick in the semifinals and Rafael Nadal in the final to win his second ATP Masters Series title. His win over Roddick in the semifinals was his first victory in six matches, while his win over Nadal was his first in three matches.

Davydenko began the European clay-court season with a final appearance in his next tournament, the Estoril Open in Portugal, where he met world no. 1, Roger Federer in the final. In the second set of the final, while trailing Federer, 6–7, 2–1, Davydenko retired with a left leg injury. He then reached the semifinals of the Monte Carlo Masters. He won his thirteenth career title in Pöertschach, defeating Juan Mónaco. After a disappointing French Open, Davydenko went on to win another title, this time in Warsaw, defeating Tommy Robredo in the final. Appearing at the 2008 Summer Olympics, Davydenko's stay in Beijing was brief; despite being seeded fourth at the Games, he would be upset by Paul-Henri Mathieu in the second round. He did not win back-to-back matches until the US Open. At the Open, he lost in the fourth round to qualifier Gilles Müller in four sets, breaking his streak of two straight semifinals.

Davydenko reached the semifinals at the Paris Masters, losing to David Nalbandian. Davydenko qualified for the Tennis Masters Cup for the fourth consecutive year. He beat Juan Martín del Potro and Jo-Wilfried Tsonga in the round-robin matches to progress to the semifinals, where he defeated Andy Murray to reach the final. There he met Novak Djokovic, losing. Davydenko finished the year ranked no. 5 in the world and in the top 5 for the fourth consecutive year.

==== 2009 ====
Davydenko started the year at an exhibition in Abu Dhabi, which featured six of the world's best players. Davydenko defeated Andy Roddick, before being defeated by top seed Rafael Nadal.

His first tour tournament was in Chennai, India, where he was the top seed. He defeated Daniel Köllerer in straight sets, but was forced to withdraw before his second-round match against Lukáš Dlouhý because of a left heel injury. This injury subsequently forced Davydenko to withdraw from the Australian Open. In Rotterdam, he was defeated in the second round by Julien Benneteau. The injury he sustained in Chennai earlier in the year returned, forcing Davydenko to withdraw from the 1000 Series tournaments in Indian Wells and Miami. This caused his ranking to fall from no. 5 to no. 9 by April 6.

Davydenko returned to the tour after a two-month absence. In Monte Carlo, he defeated Ivo Karlović and David Nalbandian, before being eliminated by Andy Murray in the quarterfinals. In Barcelona, he posted back-to-back three-set wins over Feliciano López and Radek Štěpánek. He was ousted by world no. 1 Rafael Nadal in the semifinals. Despite his run in Barcelona, his ranking slipped out of the top 10 for the first time since May 23, 2005.

Davydenko was upset in the early rounds in Rome. Davydenko reached his second semifinal of the year in Estoril by eliminating Juan Carlos Ferrero in the second round and Mardy Fish in the quarterfinals, but was stopped by American James Blake. In his last tournament before the French Open, Nikolay advanced to the third round in Madrid, before he was forced to withdraw before his match with Andy Roddick due to a leg injury. He was able to play at Roland Garros and convincingly advanced to the quarterfinals. He dropped a set apiece to Diego Junqueira and Stanislas Wawrinka and beat eighth seed Fernando Verdasco en route. He fell to eventual runner-up Robin Söderling (who had just upset Rafael Nadal in the fourth round), in straight sets.

On grass, Davydenko advanced to the third round at Wimbledon, before falling to Tomáš Berdych for the first time. After Wimbledon, he competed in the 2009 MercedesCup as second seed, falling to Fabio Fognini in the quarterfinals. He then won two straight titles: the 2009 International German Open, defeating Paul-Henri Mathieu and the 2009 ATP Studena Croatia Open Umag, defeating Juan Carlos Ferrero, dropping only one set in 10 matches. Davydenko then lost to Andy Murray in the quarterfinals of the Rogers Cup in Montreal, a loss which snapped a 12-match winning streak. He then lost in the third round of the 2009 Cincinnati Masters to Gilles Simon. Davydenko lost in the quarterfinals of the 2009 Pilot Pen Tennis to Sam Querrey. At the US Open, he reached the fourth round, before retiring against Robin Söderling with a left thigh injury.

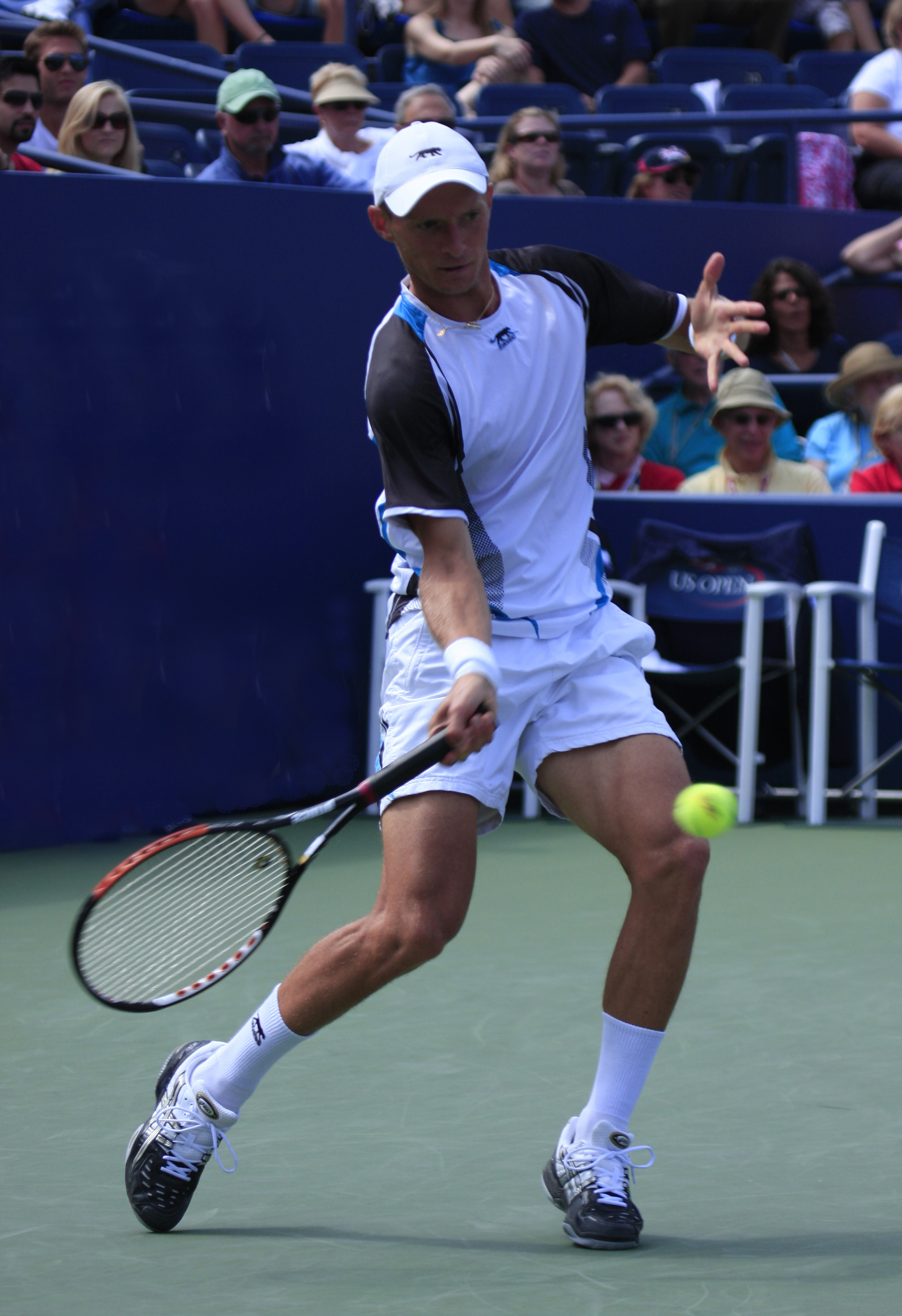
Nikolay Davydenko at 2009 US Open

He won his third title of the year at the 2009 Malaysian Open by beating Gaël Monfils in the quarterfinals, Robin Söderling in the semifinals, and Fernando Verdasco in the final. Following his triumph in Malaysia, he competed in the 2009 China Open, losing in the quarterfinals to eventual runner-up Marin Čilić. At the Shanghai Masters 1000 event, he defeated three seeded players en route to the final, tenth seed Fernando González, thirteenth seed Radek Štěpánek, and second seed Novak Djokovic. He upset Djokovic in the semifinals. In the final, he played Rafael Nadal and again won in an upset.

At the ATP World Tour Finals in London, Davydenko won four of his five matches. He lost his first round-robin match to Novak Djokovic, but he beat Nadal in his second match. He also went on to beat the odds, defeating his group leader, Robin Söderling to reach the semifinals. He recorded his first win over Roger Federer in 13 tries in the semifinals with a win. With the win, Davydenko advanced to his second consecutive ATP World Tour Finals final. He won by defeating Juan Martín del Potro in the final. This victory meant that he became the first Russian to win the event. The straight-set victory also meant that the winner won the event in straight sets for the fourth year in a row.

Davydenko finished the year ranked no. 6 in world and in the top 10 for the fifth consecutive year.

=== 2010: Wrist injury ===
Davydenko started the year at the exhibition event in Abu Dhabi, but was defeated in the first round by David Ferrer. A week later at the 2010 Qatar ExxonMobil Open, Davydenko defeated Roger Federer in the semifinal and Rafael Nadal in the final to claim his twentieth ATP World Tour title. With this victory in 2010, Davydenko became the second player to beat both Roger Federer and Rafael Nadal in the same tournament (after Juan Martín del Potro at the 2009 US Open) on separate occasions. At the Australian Open, Davydenko won his first three rounds without dropping a set, before beating Spain's Fernando Verdasco in five sets. He eventually lost to Federer in the quarterfinal in four sets.

Davydenko then went to Rotterdam to play in the ABN AMRO World Tennis Tournament. He was the second seed but, in the semifinal against Sweden's Robin Söderling Davydenko landed on his wrist, and injured it. He continued to play and lost to the eventual champion. Davydenko next appeared in the Dubai Tennis Championships.

At the 2010 BNP Paribas Open at Indian Wells, Davydenko defeated Latvia's Ernests Gulbis. Before his third-round match with Viktor Troicki of Serbia, he withdrew due to a fractured wrist. According to Davydenko, his first MRI made in the Netherlands didn't allow to determine the fracture due to an inflammation, and thus it was diagnosed only in the US. Davydenko returned to the grass court in Halle, after missing the 2010 French Open. In his first match back, he beat local player Simon Greul. He played despite his doctor's advising him against playing the tournament. However, he lost in the next round to Benjamin Becker.

He then fell in the second round of 2010 Wimbledon to Daniel Brands in four sets. He then failed to win back-to-back matches in his next four tournaments until the 2010 Western & Southern Financial Group Masters, where he defeated Robby Ginepri and David Ferrer, both in three sets, before falling to Roger Federer in the quarterfinals. He also reached the quarterfinals of the 2010 China Open, but failed to defend his title in the Shanghai Rolex Masters and fell out the top 10 for the first time in over a year. He then reached three consecutive quarterfinals in the 2010 Open Sud de France, 2010 Valencia Open 500, and 2010 BNP Paribas Masters. Davydenko did not qualify for the Barclays ATP World Tour Finals. This was the first time he did not qualify since qualifying for the first time in 2005. He also dropped out of the top 20 for the first time in over 5 1/2 years.

=== 2011–2014 : Decline ===
==== 2011 ====
2011 saw a decline in Davydenko's form. His first appearance was in the Qatar Open, where he defeated Rafael Nadal in the semifinals, but he fell in the final to Roger Federer. At the 2011 Australian Open he was defeated by unseeded Florian Mayer in four sets. He then fell in the opening rounds of 2011 ABN AMRO World Tennis Tournament and 2011 Open 13 to Frenchmen Michaël Llodra and Gilles Simon, respectively. In the 2011 Dubai Tennis Championships and 2011 BNP Paribas Open, he fell in the opening and second rounds to Tomáš Berdych and Stanislas Wawrinka, respectively. In the next two Masters 1000, he fell in the first round of the 2011 Sony Ericsson Open and 2011 Monte-Carlo Rolex Masters. He then earned his first back-to-back wins since Doha in the 2011 Barcelona Open Banco Sabadell, but fell in the third round to Nicolás Almagro.

Then, at the 2011 BMW Open tournament, he started slowly but progressively found some good form, which allowed him to eventually win the final against Florian Mayer. This was his 21st ATP title, and it meant that he had won at least one ATP-tour title for nine straight years and returned him back into the top 30 in the rankings. This was, however, his only final of the year and he failed to progress past the third round in any Grand Slam or Masters tournament, although his defeat at the US Open, came to world number one Novak Djokovic in straight sets after victories in the first two rounds against Ivan Dodig and Potito Starace.

==== 2012 ====
Davydenko lost in the first round of the Australian Open to Flavio Cipolla in five sets and the first round of Roland Garros, to Andreas Seppi. He played World No. 4, Andy Murray, in the first round of the 2012 Wimbledon Championships, and was defeated easily. Davydenko did slightly better at the US Open, winning his first-round match against Argentinian Guido Pella but losing in the second round to local Mardy Fish in five sets. The collective results represented Davydenko's worst performance at the Grand Slams in a single year.

Examining the year overall, Davydenko started poorly with a first-round loss in Doha (to world no. 3 Roger Federer) and a second-round defeat in Montpellier during January, in addition to his early exit in Australia. February started well with Davydenko reaching the semi-finals of the indoor tournament in Rotterdam, only to be defeated by Federer again. Davydenko's other best results were reaching the semi-final of the clay court tournament in Nice in May, where Davydenko was upset by Brian Baker of the USA, ranked 216 at the time; Davydenko also reached the semi-final of the indoor tournament in Metz in September, losing to Jo-Wilfried Tsonga in three sets.

In July 2012 Davydenko represented the Russian Federation at the 2012 London Olympic Games, with the tennis tournament being played at Wimbledon. In the men's singles competition Davydenko won his first-round match against Radek Štěpánek of the Czech Republic but lost in the second round to Japan's Kei Nishikori. Davydenko paired with Mikhail Youzhny in the Olympics men's doubles; they won their first-round match over Germany (Philipp Petzschner and Christopher Kas) but lost a tight match in the second round to eventual gold medallists Bob and Mike Bryan of the USA.

Davydenko's final tournament appearance of 2012 was the indoor in Basel, Switzerland in late October, where he lost in the second round to Paul-Henri Mathieu. Overall, Davydenko entered 25 tournaments in 2012 and finished with a 24-23 record, winning $498,941 in prizemoney. He finished 2012 with an ATP singles ranking of 44, down from 41 at the start of 2012.

==== 2013 ====
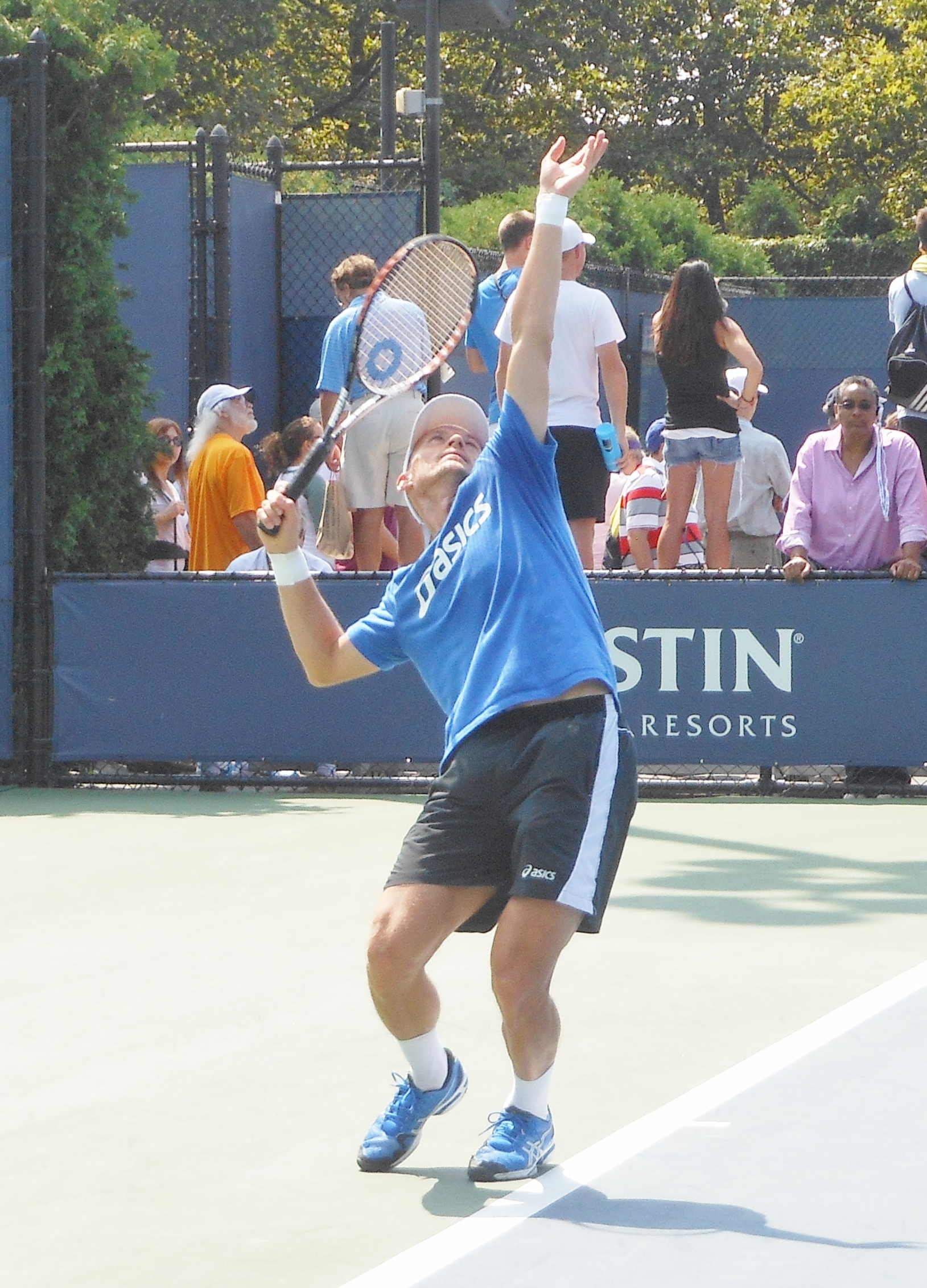
Davydenko at the 2013 US Open

Davydenko started his 2013 season by reaching the finals of the Qatar ExxonMobil Open in January after defeating Spain's David Ferrer (then ranked 5 in the world) in the semifinals. He then took on Richard Gasquet, the world number 10, in the final, eventually losing in 3 sets. He would later appear at the French Open, reaching the third round before being knocked out by Gasquet in straight sets.

He ended the year in rank No. 53.

==== 2014: Retirement ====
In the 2014 season, Davydenko failed to win consecutively. He lost to Daniel Brands in the first round of the Qatar Open. He was beaten by Richard Gasquet in the second round of the Australian Open. In Montpellier, Davydenko defeated world no.39 Julien Benneteau but was stunned by world no. 248 Albano Olivetti. In 2014 Open 13 second round, he was beaten by Jo-Wilfried Tsonga. At the 2014 Indian Wells Masters, he reached the second round losing to John Isner. In the 2014 Sony Open Tennis first round, he was defeated by Adrian Mannarino.

Davydenko began his clay court season with a first round loss to Albert Ramos Viñolas at the Barcelona Open. At BMW Open, he was defeated by Federico Delbonis. He won his first clay court match of the season at the Düsseldorf Open by defeating Dudi Sela before losing to Jiri Vesely second round. After losing the first round of the 2014 French Open, he skipped the grass court season to decide whether he would retire or not. Sources close to the Russian Davis Cup team and tennis federation said that Davydenko had decided to retire and that he would be honoured with a farewell ceremony at that year's Kremlin Cup. On October 16, Davydenko confirmed these rumors by announcing his retirement at a press conference in Moscow.

== Playing style ==
Davydenko employed an offensive baseline game, using deep and penetrating groundstrokes on both wings. His groundstrokes were technically efficient on both forehand and backhand. His tremendous footspeed and anticipation enabled him to hit the ball early which caught opponents out of position and allowed him to dictate the play, somewhat similar to former world no. 1 Andre Agassi. Davydenko's best shot was his backhand, which he could hit down the line, cross court, or with extreme angles. He was known for his running shots which he took early and often turned into winners. His serve was technically correct and very consistent, even though it lacked the fire-power to become a serious weapon. Davydenko's style made him an effective player on any surface, however he was most successful on hard and clay courts, as he had not made any significant breakthroughs on grass.

Davydenko's main weaknesses were his volleys, and his occasional inability to close out matches. His volleys were not as consistent as his groundstrokes, though he did have one of the best swinging volleys on tour. Many tennis analysts also criticized Davydenko for lacking variation in his game due to the fact that he mainly played from the baseline with his consistent groundstrokes. In the later years of his career, he varied his game by employing the slice and moving into the net more often. Davydenko's difficulty closing matches lost him numerous important matches after holding the lead. This was evident during the 2006 Tennis Masters Cup against James Blake and Rafael Nadal where he won the first set and had the lead in the second, but lost. Against Roger Federer, he blew a lead at the 2006 and 2010 Australian Opens as well as at the 2007 French Open. In the 2006 Australian Open, he had three set points in the third to go up 2 sets to 1, but lost the set and eventually the match.

== Equipment ==
Beginning mid-2010, he began using Dunlop Sport racquets and was using the Dunlop Biomimetic 200 Plus. However, in the beginning of 2012, he stopped the contract with Dunlop and returned to using the Prince Ozone Pro Tour.

At the 2014 BNP Paribas Open in Indian Wells California, Davydenko was playing with a Babolat AeroPro Drive GT.

Davydenko wore Asics shoes and clothing towards the end of his career. His previous brand was Airness.

== Controversies ==
In January 2007, Davydenko was fined AU$10,000 and apologised to Sydney International organisers after criticising the tournament for being "too small" and withdrawing from the tournament due to injury.

The ATP launched a match fixing investigation of Davydenko's match against Martín Vassallo Argüello in Sopot of 2 August 2007, after several large bets were placed at an online British gambling company, Betfair, in Argüello's favour after Davydenko had won the first set 6–2. Davydenko withdrew from the match during the third set with a foot injury. Although Davydenko had suffered three first-round defeats in his last three tournaments, was injured in an earlier-round match, and showed signs of injury in the second set, it did not make sense to Betfair that such a heavy betting volume would go in Argüello's direction at that point of time in the match. Per its agreement with the ATP, Betfair notified the Tour. It has since been revealed that nine people based in Russia had bet US$1.5M on Davydenko losing while two unknown people would gain US$6M from the loss. A total of $7M was wagered on the match, ten times the usual amount. Due to these irregularities, all bets were voided. On September 11, 2008, Davydenko, along with Argüello, were cleared of any involvement in match-fixing. The inquiry, which lasted over a year, was the longest ever held into match-fixing in tennis.

Further controversy also surrounded Davydenko after one of his matches at St. Petersburg Open in October 2007. During his 6–1, 5–7, 1–6 defeat by Marin Čilić, he was given a code violation by umpire Jean-Philippe Dercq for not giving his best effort. He was later fined $2000 by the ATP, but the fine was rescinded upon appeal. The following week, he lost 2–6, 2–6 to Marcos Baghdatis at the Paris Masters. This generated some controversy, as Davydenko was cautioned by the umpire to do his best during the match.

== Career statistics ==
=== Grand Slam tournament performance timeline ===
Key
W	F	SF	QF	#R	RR	Q#	DNQ	A	NH

(W) winner; (F) finalist; (SF) semifinalist; (QF) quarterfinalist; (#R) rounds 4, 3, 2, 1; (RR) round-robin stage; (Q#) qualification round; (DNQ) did not qualify; (A) absent; (NH) not held; (SR) strike rate (events won / competed); (W–L) win–loss record.

Tournament	2000	2001	2002	2003	2004	2005	2006	2007	2008	2009	2010	2011	2012	2013	2014	SR	W–L	Win %
Australian Open	A	2R	1R	1R	2R	QF	QF	QF	4R	A	QF	1R	1R	2R	2R	0 / 13	23–13	63.89
French Open	A	2R	2R	2R	1R	SF	QF	SF	3R	QF	A	2R	1R	3R	1R	0 / 13	26–13	68.42
Wimbledon	A	A	1R	1R	1R	2R	1R	4R	1R	3R	2R	1R	1R	A	A	0 / 11	7–11	41.18
US Open	A	1R	2R	2R	3R	2R	SF	SF	4R	4R	2R	3R	2R	2R	A	0 / 13	26–13	66.67
Win–loss	0–0	2–3	2–4	2–4	3–4	11–4	13–4	17–4	8–4	9–3	6–3	3–4	1–4	4–3	1–2	0 / 50	82–50	63.28

=== Year-end championship finals ===
==== Singles: 2 (1 title, 1 runner-up) ====
Result	Date	Championship	Surface	Opponent	Score
Loss	2008	Shanghai	Hard (i)	(Serbia) Novak Djokovic	1–6, 5–7
Win	2009	London	Hard (i)	(Argentina) Juan Martín del Potro	6–3, 6–4

== See also ==
- Match fixing in tennis
