= 2010 Rafael Nadal tennis season =

Statistics for Spanish tennis player

Rafael Nadal
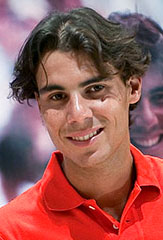
- Full name: Rafael Nadal Parera
- Country: Spain
- Calendar prize money: $10,171,998

Singles
- Season record: 71–10
- Calendar titles: 7
- Year-end ranking: No. 1
- Ranking change from previous year: ▲1

Grand Slam & significant results
- Australian Open: QF
- French Open: W
- Wimbledon: W
- US Open: W
- Other tournaments
- Tour Finals: F

Doubles
- Season record: 6–3
- Calendar titles: 1
- Year-end ranking: No. 79
- Ranking change from previous year: ▲53

The 2010 Rafael Nadal tennis season is lauded as one of the greatest seasons of all time. Nadal himself also called it his best year. In the 2010 season, Nadal became the first male player in tennis history to win Grand Slam tournaments on three different surfaces (clay, grass and hard court) in the same year, referred to as a Surface Slam. He became the first man since Rod Laver in 1969 to win the French-Wimbledon-US triplet in a calendar year, being the fourth in history. At 24 years, 3 months and 10 days, after his win at the US Open, he simultaneously became the youngest player in the Open Era to complete both (in singles) the Career Grand Slam, and the Career Golden Slam. With this achievement, he was the second man in history to complete the Career Golden Slam in singles, after Andre Agassi did so in 1996. He also became the second man to win at least two majors on three different surfaces in his career (Double Career Surface Slam). Nadal further cemented his place in history by becoming the first, and only player to-date, to win Monte-Carlo Masters, Madrid Masters, Rome Masters, and the French Open in a calendar year, a feat known as the Clay Slam.

== Year summary ==
=== Capital World Tennis Championship ===
Nadal began the year by participating in the Capitala World Tennis Championship in Abu Dhabi, United Arab Emirates. He defeated compatriot David Ferrer (7-6(3), 6-3) to reach his second final in the exhibition tournament. In the final, Nadal defeated Robin Söderling (7-6(3), 7-5).

=== Qatar ExxonMobil Open ===
Secondly, Nadal participated in the Australian Open warm-up tournament, the Qatar ExxonMobil Open ATP 250 event in Doha, where he lost in the final. He defeated the Italians Simone Bolelli in the first round (6-3, 6-3) and Potito Starace (6-2, 6-2) in the second round. In the quarter-finals, the Spaniard defeated the Belgian Steve Darcis: 6-1, 2-0(ret). After that, in the semi-final, Nadal defeated the fifth seed Viktor Troicki (6-1, 6-3), winning eleven games in a row. In the final, Nadal lost to Russian Nikolay Davydenko (6-0, 6-7(8), 4-6), despite dominating the opening set and holding two match points in the second set. Davydenko had also defeated Roger Federer in the semi-final before facing Nadal in the final.

=== Australian Open ===
In the first round of the Australian Open, Nadal defeated the Australian Peter Luczak (7-6(0), 6-1, 6-4). In the second round, he beat Lukáš Lacko (6-2, 6-2, 6-2). In the third round, he was tested by Philipp Kohlschreiber, finally beating him in four sets (6-4, 6-2, 2-6, 7-5). In the fourth round, he beat the Croatian Ivo Karlović, (6-4, 4-6, 6-4, 6-4). In the quarter-finals, Nadal pulled out in the third set against Andy Murray, having lost the first two sets (6-3, 7-6(2)). After having his knee examined, doctors told Nadal to take two weeks of rest followed by two weeks of rehabilitation.

In singles, Nadal reached the semi-finals at the BNP Paribas Open in Indian Wells as the current defending champion. However, the eventual winner, Ivan Ljubičić, defeated him in three sets. He and López won the doubles title by defeating the number one seeds Daniel Nestor and Nenad Zimonjić. This boosted Nadal's doubles ranking 175 places, going from number 241 to being number 66 in the world. After Indian Wells, Nadal reached the semi-finals of Sony Ericsson Open where he lost to the eventual champion Andy Roddick in three sets.

=== Monte Carlo Rolex Masters ===
Nadal reached the final of the Monte-Carlo Rolex Masters in Monaco after beating the fellow Spaniard David Ferrer (6-3, 6-2) in the semi-finals. This was Nadal's first tour final since Doha earlier that year. He won the final with a (6-0, 6-1) score over his compatriot Fernando Verdasco. He lost fourteen games throughout all five matches, the fewest he had ever lost en route to a championship, and the tournament's final was the shortest Masters 1000 final in terms of games. With this win, Nadal became the first player in open history to win a tournament title for six straight years.

Unlike previous years, Nadal chose to skip the Barcelona tournament despite the fact that he was the five-time defending champion.

=== Internazional BNL d'Italia ===
His next tournament was the 2010 Internazionali BNL d'Italia. He defeated Philipp Kohlschreiber, Victor Hănescu, and Stanislas Wawrinka all in straight sets to win his 57th straight match, in April. In the semi-finals, he faced a resilient Ernests Gulbis, who defeated Roger Federer earlier in the tournament and battled Nadal into a three-set-match for the first time in this clay court season. Nadal eventually prevailed with a (6-4, 3-6, 6-4) in two hours and forty minutes. Then he defeated compatriot David Ferrer in the final (7-5, 6-2) for his fifth title at Rome, to equal Andre Agassi's record of winning 17 ATP Masters 1000 titles.

=== Madrid Open ===
Nadal then entered the 2010 Mutua Madrileña Madrid Open, where he had finished runner-up the previous year. By being one of the top eight seeds, he received a bye in the first round. In the second round, he defeated the qualifier Oleksandr Dolgopolov, Jr. in straight sets. He then played the six-foot-nine American John Isner, and Nadal comfortably came through in straight sets, (7-5, 6-4). In the quarter-finals, he defeated Gaël Monfils (6-1, 6-3) and then his countryman Nicolás Almagro, who was playing the first Masters 1000 semifinal of his career, (4-6, 6-2, 6-2). The first set of his match against Almagro would be just the second set he lost on clay courts up to this point in 2010. Nadal then defeated his longtime rival Roger Federer (6-4, 7-6(5)), avenging his 2009 final loss to Federer. The win gave him his 18th Masters 1000 title, breaking the all-time record. He became the first player to win all three clay court Masters 1000 titles in a single year and the first player to win three consecutive Masters events. Nadal moved back to No. 2 in the rankings the following day.

=== French Open ===
Entering the French Open, many were expecting another Nadal-Federer final. However, this became impossible when rival Robin Söderling defeated Federer (3-6, 6-3, 7-5, 6-4) in the quarter-finals. The failure of Federer to reach the semi-finals would allow Nadal to regain the world number 1 ranking, if he were to win the tournament. Nadal advanced to the final and defeated Soderling (6-4, 6-2, 6-4) to win the French Open. The win gave Nadal his seventh Grand Slam, tying him with John McEnroe, John Newcombe and Mats Wilander on the all-time list, and allowed Nadal to reclaim the position of ATP World Number One; denying his biggest rival Roger Federer the all-time record for weeks at No. 1. With this win, Nadal became the first man to win the three Masters series on clay and the French Open; this was dubbed by the media as the "Clay Slam". This victory at Roland Garros marked the second time that Nadal had won the French Open without dropping a single set (tying the record held by Björn Borg). With the win in Paris he also booked his place at the World Tour Finals in London, and became the first player to win five French Open titles in six years.

As of 2017, Nadal's clay season was the second most successful in his career, as he earned 5,000 points after winning 4 titles. This was only surpassed by his 2013 season, in which Nadal earned 5,100 points after winning Barcelona, Madrid, Rome and the French Open, and being runner-up in Monte-Carlo.

=== Aegon Championships ===
In June, Nadal entered the Aegon Championships—which he won in 2008—at the prestigious Queen's Club. He played singles and doubles at this grass court tournament as a warm up for the Wimbledon Championships. By being one of the top eight seeds, he received a bye in the first round. In the second round, where he played his first match on grass since winning Wimbledon in 2008, he defeated the Brazilian Marcos Daniel easily in two sets, (6-2, 6-2). In the third round, he played Denis Istomin of Uzbekistan, whom he defeated (7-6(4), 4-6, 6-4), to advance to the quarter-finals. However, in the quarter-finals he was defeated by his compatriot Feliciano López (6-7(5), 4-6), and left the competition without a title.

=== Wimbledon ===
At the 2010 Wimbledon Championships Nadal started by beating Kei Nishikori (6-2, 6-4, 6-4) in the first round. In the second round, he fought hard and succeeded against Robin Haase after five sets (5-7, 6-2, 3-6, 6-0, 6-3). In the third round, he defeated Philipp Petzschner. The match was a 5-set thriller with Nadal triumphing (6-4, 4-6, 6-7, 6-2, 6-3). During this match, Nadal was warned twice for receiving coaching from his coach and uncle, Toni Nadal, resulting in a $2,000 fine by Wimbledon officials. Allegedly, encouraging words for Nadal shouted during the match were some sort of coaching code signal. After that, Nadal comfortably beat the French Paul-Henri Mathieu in three sets (6-4, 6-2, 6-2). In the quarter-finals, he got past the Swedish Robin Söderling in four sets (3-6, 6-3, 7-6(7-4), 6-1). He then defeated Andy Murray in straight sets (6-4, 7-6(8-6), 6-4) to reach his fourth Wimbledon final.

In the 2010 Wimbledon men's title, Nadal won the tournament by defeating Tomáš Berdych in straight sets (6-3, 7-5, 6-4). After the win, Rafa said, "It is more than a dream for me" and thanked the crowd for being both kind and supportive to him during this match and also in the semi-final against Andy Murray. The win gave him a second Wimbledon title and an eighth career major title, at the age of 24.

=== Rogers Cup ===
In his first hard-court tournament since Miami, Nadal advanced to the semi-finals of the Rogers Cup, along with No. 2 Novak Djokovic, No. 3 Roger Federer, and No. 4 Andy Murray, after coming back from a one-set deficit to defeat the German Philipp Kohlschreiber (3-6, 6-3, 6-4). In the semifinal, defending champion Andy Murray defeated Nadal (6-3, 6-4), becoming the only player to triumph over the Spaniard twice in 2010. Nadal also competed in the doubles tournament with Novak Djokovic in a one-time, high-profile partnership, not seen since 1976 when Jimmy Connors and Arthur Ashe as World No.1 and No.2 paired up, making a double dream team. However, they lost in the first round to Canadians Milos Raonic and Vasek Pospisil.

The next week, Nadal was the top seed at the Cincinnati Masters, losing in the quarter-finals to 2006 Australian Open finalist Marcos Baghdatis.

=== US Open ===
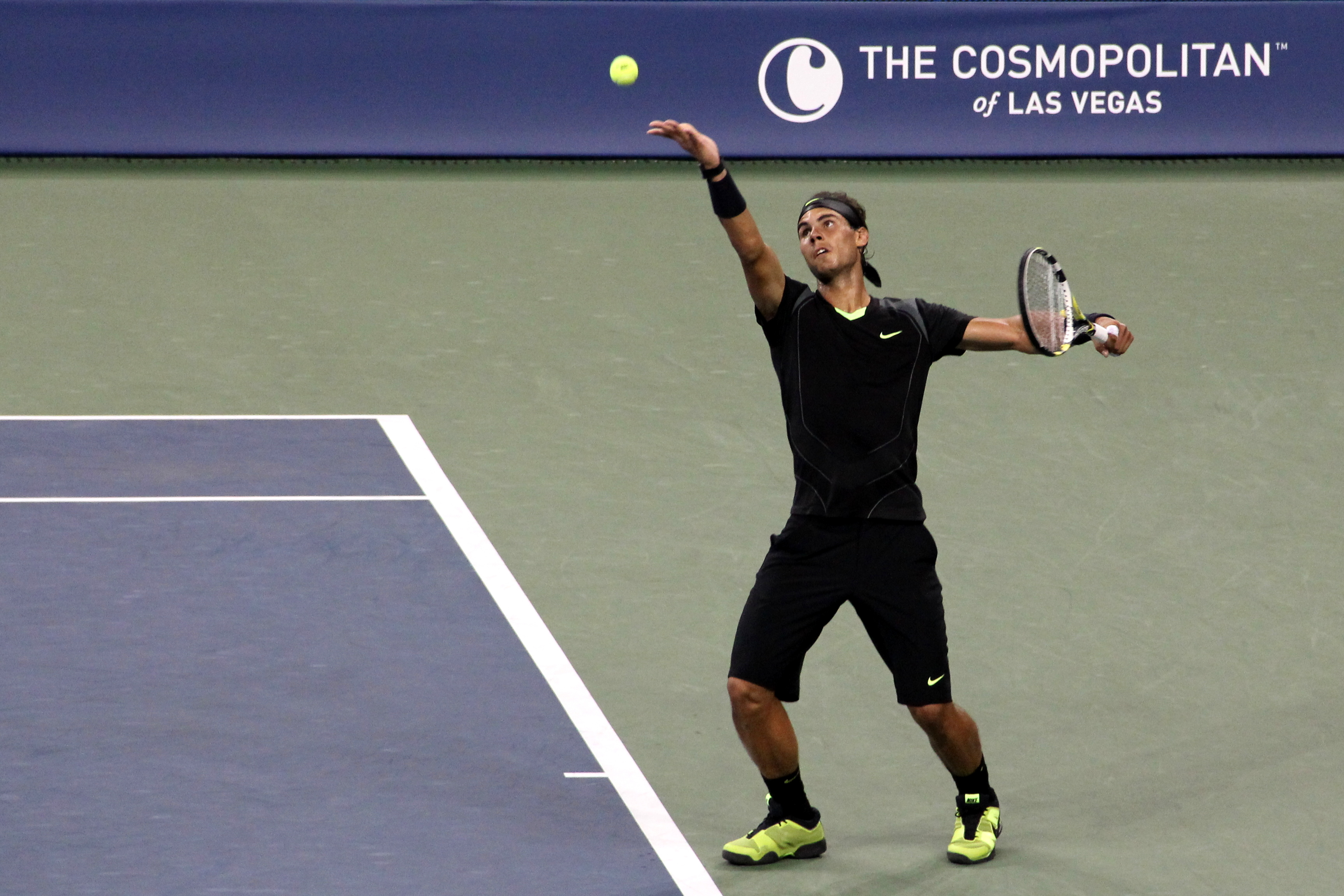
Rafael Nadal won the 2010 US Open title, thus completing the Career Grand Slam.

At the 2010 US Open, Nadal was the top seed for the second time in three years. He defeated Teymuraz Gabashvili, Denis Istomin, Gilles Simon, 23rd seed Feliciano López, 8th seed Fernando Verdasco, and 12th seed Mikhail Youzhny, all without dropping a set, to reach his first US Open final. By doing that he became the 8th man in the Open Era to reach the final of all four majors at the age 24; the second youngest to ever do so, behind only Jim Courier. In the final, he defeated 3rd seed Novak Djokovic (6-4, 5-7, 6-4, 6-2), which completed the Career Grand Slam for Nadal, and he became the second male after Andre Agassi to complete a Career Golden Slam. Nadal also became the first man to win Grand Slams on clay, grass, and hard court surfaces in the same year (later accomplished by Djokovic in 2021 after winning the Australian Open, French Open and Wimbledon Championships), and the first to win the French Open, Wimbledon, and the US Open in the same year since Rod Laver in 1969. With the US Open win, Nadal became, along with Mats Wilander, the only male players to win at least two Grand Slams each on clay, grass, and hard court in their careers (Novak Djokovic later completed this feat with his second French Open title in 2021). After all that, he also became the first left-handed man to win the US Open since John McEnroe in 1984. This victory also clinched the year-end number one ranking for 2010, making Nadal the third player (after Ivan Lendl in 1989 and Roger Federer in 2009) to regain the year-end number one ranking after having lost it.

=== Thailand Open ===
Nadal began his Asian tour at 2010 PTT Thailand Open in Bangkok, where he reached the semi-finals, losing to his compatriot Guillermo García-López.

=== Japan Open ===
He was able to regroup, and at the 2010 Rakuten Japan Open Tennis Championships in Tokyo (debut), he defeated Santiago Giraldo, Milos Raonic and Dmitry Tursunov. In the semi-finals against Viktor Troicki, Nadal saved two match points in the deciding-set tiebreaker, to win it 9-7 in the end. In the final, Nadal comfortably defeated Gaël Monfils (6-1, 7-5) for his 7th title of the season.

=== Shanghai Rolex Masters ===
Nadal next played in the 2010 Shanghai Rolex Masters, in Shanghai, where he was the top seed, but lost to world's number twelve, Jürgen Melzer in the third round, stopping his record streak of 21 consecutive Masters quarter-finals. On 5 November, Nadal announced that he was pulling out of the Paris Masters due to tendinitis in his left shoulder.

=== ATP World Tour Finals ===
At the ATP World Tour Finals in London, Nadal defeated Andy Roddick (3-6, 7-6(5), 6-4) in the first match. He then beat Djokovic in a tight match where Djokovic had trouble with his contact lenses, prevailing (7-5, 6-2). A further victory against Berdych, (7-6(3), 6-1), sent him to his third World Tour Final semi-final. It was the first time he had won all three round-robins, in stark contrast to the previous year. In the semi-finals, he was thrice two points from defeat and was able to win the match on his third match point (7-6(5), 3-6, 7-6(6)). In the final, Nadal lost against Roger Federer with a score of (3-6, 6-3, 1-6). This was Nadal's last tournament in the 2010 professional tennis season.

=== Match for Africa ===
Finally, he played Federer in the two-match exhibition Match for Africa for the Roger Federer Foundation and the Rafa Nadal Foundation. The first match took place in Zürich on December 21, 2010, and was won by Federer, (4-6, 6-3, and 6-3). The following match was played in Madrid, and Nadal beat Federer with a score of (7-6 (3), 4-6, 6-1).

== All matches ==
=== Singles ===
Tournament	Match	Round	Opponent (seed or key)	Rank	Result	Score
Qatar Open; Doha, Qatar; ATP 250; Hard, outdoor 4 – 9 January 2010
Qatar Open; Doha, Qatar; ATP 250; Hard, outdoor 4 – 9 January 2010	1 / 493	1R	(Italy) Simone Bolelli	93	Win	6–3, 6–3
Qatar Open; Doha, Qatar; ATP 250; Hard, outdoor 4 – 9 January 2010	2 / 494	2R	(Italy) Potito Starace	62	Win	6–2, 6–2
Qatar Open; Doha, Qatar; ATP 250; Hard, outdoor 4 – 9 January 2010	3 / 495	QF	(Belgium) Steve Darcis (Q)	122	Win	6–1, 2–0, retired
Qatar Open; Doha, Qatar; ATP 250; Hard, outdoor 4 – 9 January 2010	4 / 496	SF	(Serbia) Viktor Troicki (5)	29	Win	6–1, 6–3
Qatar Open; Doha, Qatar; ATP 250; Hard, outdoor 4 – 9 January 2010	5 / 497	F	(Russia) Nikolay Davydenko (3)	6	Loss (1)	6–0, 6–7^{(8–10)}, 4–6
Australian Open; Melbourne, Australia; Grand Slam tournament Hard, outdoor 18 – 31 January 2010
Australian Open; Melbourne, Australia; Grand Slam tournament Hard, outdoor 18 – 31 January 2010	6 / 498	1R	(Australia) Peter Luczak	70	Win	7–6^{(7–0)}, 6–1, 6–4
Australian Open; Melbourne, Australia; Grand Slam tournament Hard, outdoor 18 – 31 January 2010	7 / 499	2R	(Slovakia) Lukáš Lacko	75	Win	6–2, 6–2, 6–2
Australian Open; Melbourne, Australia; Grand Slam tournament Hard, outdoor 18 – 31 January 2010	8 / 500	3R	(Germany) Philipp Kohlschreiber (27)	26	Win	6–4, 6–2, 2–6, 7–5
Australian Open; Melbourne, Australia; Grand Slam tournament Hard, outdoor 18 – 31 January 2010	9 / 501	4R	(Croatia) Ivo Karlović	39	Win	6–4, 4–6, 6–4, 6–4
Australian Open; Melbourne, Australia; Grand Slam tournament Hard, outdoor 18 – 31 January 2010	10 / 502	QF	(United Kingdom) Andy Murray (5)	4	Loss	3–6, 6–7^{(2–7)}, 0–3, retired
BNP Paribas Open; Indian Wells, United States; ATP 1000; Hard, outdoor 8 – 21 March 2010
BNP Paribas Open; Indian Wells, United States; ATP 1000; Hard, outdoor 8 – 21 March 2010	–	1R	Bye			
BNP Paribas Open; Indian Wells, United States; ATP 1000; Hard, outdoor 8 – 21 March 2010	11 / 503	2R	(Germany) Rainer Schüttler (Q)	90	Win	6–4, 6–4
BNP Paribas Open; Indian Wells, United States; ATP 1000; Hard, outdoor 8 – 21 March 2010	12 / 504	3R	(Croatia) Mario Ančić	694	Win	6–2, 6–2
BNP Paribas Open; Indian Wells, United States; ATP 1000; Hard, outdoor 8 – 21 March 2010	13 / 505	4R	(United States) John Isner (15)	20	Win	7–5, 3–6, 6–3
BNP Paribas Open; Indian Wells, United States; ATP 1000; Hard, outdoor 8 – 21 March 2010	14 / 506	QF	(Czech Republic) Tomáš Berdych (19)	25	Win	6–4, 7–6^{(7–4)}
BNP Paribas Open; Indian Wells, United States; ATP 1000; Hard, outdoor 8 – 21 March 2010	15 / 507	SF	(Croatia) Ivan Ljubičić (20)	26	Loss	6–3, 4–6, 6–7^{(1–7)}
Sony Ericsson Open; Miami, United States; ATP 1000; Hard, outdoor 22 March – 4 April 2010
Sony Ericsson Open; Miami, United States; ATP 1000; Hard, outdoor 22 March – 4 April 2010	–	1R	Bye			
Sony Ericsson Open; Miami, United States; ATP 1000; Hard, outdoor 22 March – 4 April 2010	16 / 508	2R	(United States) Taylor Dent	83	Win	6–4, 6–3
Sony Ericsson Open; Miami, United States; ATP 1000; Hard, outdoor 22 March – 4 April 2010	17 / 509	3R	(Argentina) David Nalbandian (WC)	161	Win	6–7^{(8–10)}, 6–2, 6–2
Sony Ericsson Open; Miami, United States; ATP 1000; Hard, outdoor 22 March – 4 April 2010	18 / 510	4R	(Spain) David Ferrer (15)	17	Win	7–6^{(7–5)}, 6–4
Sony Ericsson Open; Miami, United States; ATP 1000; Hard, outdoor 22 March – 4 April 2010	19 / 511	QF	(France) Jo-Wilfried Tsonga (8)	10	Win	6–3, 6–2
Sony Ericsson Open; Miami, United States; ATP 1000; Hard, outdoor 22 March – 4 April 2010	20 / 512	SF	(United States) Andy Roddick (6)	8	Loss	6–4, 3–6, 3–6
Monte-Carlo Rolex Masters; Monte Carlo, Monaco; ATP 1000; Clay, outdoor 12 – 18 April 2010
Monte-Carlo Rolex Masters; Monte Carlo, Monaco; ATP 1000; Clay, outdoor 12 – 18 April 2010	–	1R	Bye			
Monte-Carlo Rolex Masters; Monte Carlo, Monaco; ATP 1000; Clay, outdoor 12 – 18 April 2010	21 / 513	2R	(Netherlands) Thiemo de Bakker (Q)	77	Win	6–1, 6–0
Monte-Carlo Rolex Masters; Monte Carlo, Monaco; ATP 1000; Clay, outdoor 12 – 18 April 2010	22 / 514	3R	(Germany) Michael Berrer	51	Win	6–0, 6–1
Monte-Carlo Rolex Masters; Monte Carlo, Monaco; ATP 1000; Clay, outdoor 12 – 18 April 2010	23 / 515	QF	(Spain) Juan Carlos Ferrero (9)	16	Win	6–4, 6–2
Monte-Carlo Rolex Masters; Monte Carlo, Monaco; ATP 1000; Clay, outdoor 12 – 18 April 2010	24 / 516	SF	(Spain) David Ferrer (11)	17	Win	6–2, 6–3
Monte-Carlo Rolex Masters; Monte Carlo, Monaco; ATP 1000; Clay, outdoor 12 – 18 April 2010	25 / 517	W	(Spain) Fernando Verdasco (6)	12	Win (1)	6–0, 6–1
Internazionali BNL d'Italia; Rome, Italy; ATP 1000; Clay, outdoor 26 April – 2 May 2010
Internazionali BNL d'Italia; Rome, Italy; ATP 1000; Clay, outdoor 26 April – 2 May 2010	–	1R	Bye			
Internazionali BNL d'Italia; Rome, Italy; ATP 1000; Clay, outdoor 26 April – 2 May 2010	26 / 518	2R	(Germany) Philipp Kohlschreiber	29	Win	6–1, 6–3
Internazionali BNL d'Italia; Rome, Italy; ATP 1000; Clay, outdoor 26 April – 2 May 2010	27 / 519	3R	(Romania) Victor Hănescu	39	Win	6–3, 6–2
Internazionali BNL d'Italia; Rome, Italy; ATP 1000; Clay, outdoor 26 April – 2 May 2010	28 / 520	QF	(Switzerland) Stanislas Wawrinka	26	Win	6–4, 6–1
Internazionali BNL d'Italia; Rome, Italy; ATP 1000; Clay, outdoor 26 April – 2 May 2010	29 / 521	SF	(Latvia) Ernests Gulbis	40	Win	6–4, 3–6, 6–4
Internazionali BNL d'Italia; Rome, Italy; ATP 1000; Clay, outdoor 26 April – 2 May 2010	30 / 522	W	(Spain) David Ferrer (13)	17	Win (2)	7–5, 6–2
Mutua Madrileña Madrid Open; Madrid, Spain; ATP 1000; Clay, outdoor 10 – 16 May 2010
Mutua Madrileña Madrid Open; Madrid, Spain; ATP 1000; Clay, outdoor 10 – 16 May 2010	–	1R	Bye			
Mutua Madrileña Madrid Open; Madrid, Spain; ATP 1000; Clay, outdoor 10 – 16 May 2010	31 / 523	2R	(Ukraine) Alexandr Dolgopolov (Q)	62	Win	6–4, 6–3
Mutua Madrileña Madrid Open; Madrid, Spain; ATP 1000; Clay, outdoor 10 – 16 May 2010	32 / 524	3R	(United States) John Isner (13)	19	Win	7–5, 6–4
Mutua Madrileña Madrid Open; Madrid, Spain; ATP 1000; Clay, outdoor 10 – 16 May 2010	33 / 525	QF	(France) Gaël Monfils (12)	18	Win	6–1, 6–3
Mutua Madrileña Madrid Open; Madrid, Spain; ATP 1000; Clay, outdoor 10 – 16 May 2010	34 / 526	SF	(Spain) Nicolás Almagro	35	Win	4–6, 6–2, 6–2
Mutua Madrileña Madrid Open; Madrid, Spain; ATP 1000; Clay, outdoor 10 – 16 May 2010	35 / 527	W	(Switzerland) Roger Federer (1)	1	Win (3)	6–4, 7–6^{(7–5)}
French Open; Paris, France; Grand Slam tournament Clay, outdoor 24 May – 6 June 2010
French Open; Paris, France; Grand Slam tournament Clay, outdoor 24 May – 6 June 2010	36 / 528	1R	(France) Gianni Mina (WC)	655	Win	6–2, 6–2, 6–2
French Open; Paris, France; Grand Slam tournament Clay, outdoor 24 May – 6 June 2010	37 / 529	2R	(Argentina) Horacio Zeballos	44	Win	6–2, 6–2, 6–3
French Open; Paris, France; Grand Slam tournament Clay, outdoor 24 May – 6 June 2010	38 / 530	3R	(Australia) Lleyton Hewitt (28)	33	Win	6–3, 6–4, 6–3
French Open; Paris, France; Grand Slam tournament Clay, outdoor 24 May – 6 June 2010	39 / 531	4R	(Brazil) Thomaz Bellucci (24)	29	Win	6–2, 7–5, 6–4
French Open; Paris, France; Grand Slam tournament Clay, outdoor 24 May – 6 June 2010	40 / 532	QF	(Spain) Nicolás Almagro (19)	21	Win	7–6^{(7–2)}, 7–6^{(7–3)}, 6–4
French Open; Paris, France; Grand Slam tournament Clay, outdoor 24 May – 6 June 2010	41 / 533	SF	(Austria) Jürgen Melzer (22)	27	Win	6–2, 6–3, 7–6^{(8–6)}
French Open; Paris, France; Grand Slam tournament Clay, outdoor 24 May – 6 June 2010	42 / 534	W	(Sweden) Robin Söderling (5)	7	Win (4)	6–4, 6–2, 6–4
Aegon Championships; London, United Kingdom; ATP 250; Grass, outdoor 7 – 13 June 2010
Aegon Championships; London, United Kingdom; ATP 250; Grass, outdoor 7 – 13 June 2010	–	1R	Bye			
Aegon Championships; London, United Kingdom; ATP 250; Grass, outdoor 7 – 13 June 2010	43 / 535	2R	(Brazil) Marcos Daniel	112	Win	6–2, 6–2
Aegon Championships; London, United Kingdom; ATP 250; Grass, outdoor 7 – 13 June 2010	44 / 536	3R	(Uzbekistan) Denis Istomin (16)	72	Win	7–6^{(6–4)}, 4–6, 6–4
Aegon Championships; London, United Kingdom; ATP 250; Grass, outdoor 7 – 13 June 2010	45 / 537	QF	(Spain) Feliciano López (8)	31	Loss	6–7^{(5–7)}, 4–6
The Championships, Wimbledon; London, United Kingdom; Grand Slam tournament Grass, outdoor 21 June – 4 July 2010
The Championships, Wimbledon; London, United Kingdom; Grand Slam tournament Grass, outdoor 21 June – 4 July 2010	46 / 538	1R	(Japan) Kei Nishikori (WC)	189	Win	6–2, 6–4, 6–4
The Championships, Wimbledon; London, United Kingdom; Grand Slam tournament Grass, outdoor 21 June – 4 July 2010	47 / 539	2R	(Netherlands) Robin Haase (PR)	151	Win	5–7, 6–2, 3–6, 6–0, 6–3
The Championships, Wimbledon; London, United Kingdom; Grand Slam tournament Grass, outdoor 21 June – 4 July 2010	48 / 540	3R	(Germany) Philipp Petzschner (33)	41	Win	6–4, 4–6, 6–7^{(5–7)}, 6–2, 6–3
The Championships, Wimbledon; London, United Kingdom; Grand Slam tournament Grass, outdoor 21 June – 4 July 2010	49 / 541	4R	(France) Paul-Henri Mathieu	66	Win	6–4, 6–2, 6–2
The Championships, Wimbledon; London, United Kingdom; Grand Slam tournament Grass, outdoor 21 June – 4 July 2010	50 / 542	QF	(Sweden) Robin Söderling (6)	6	Win	3–6, 6–3, 7–6^{(7–4)}, 6–1
The Championships, Wimbledon; London, United Kingdom; Grand Slam tournament Grass, outdoor 21 June – 4 July 2010	51 / 543	SF	(United Kingdom) Andy Murray (4)	4	Win	6–4, 7–6^{(8–6)}, 6–4
The Championships, Wimbledon; London, United Kingdom; Grand Slam tournament Grass, outdoor 21 June – 4 July 2010	52 / 544	W	(Czech Republic) Tomáš Berdych (12)	13	Win (5)	6–3, 7–5, 6–4
Rogers Cup; Toronto, Canada; ATP 1000; Hard, outdoor 9 – 15 August 2010
Rogers Cup; Toronto, Canada; ATP 1000; Hard, outdoor 9 – 15 August 2010	–	1R	Bye			
Rogers Cup; Toronto, Canada; ATP 1000; Hard, outdoor 9 – 15 August 2010	53 / 545	2R	(Switzerland) Stanislas Wawrinka	24	Win	7–6^{(14–12)}, 6–3
Rogers Cup; Toronto, Canada; ATP 1000; Hard, outdoor 9 – 15 August 2010	54 / 546	3R	(South Africa) Kevin Anderson (Q)	87	Win	6–2, 7–6^{(8–6)}
Rogers Cup; Toronto, Canada; ATP 1000; Hard, outdoor 9 – 15 August 2010	55 / 547	QF	(Germany) Philipp Kohlschreiber	37	Win	3–6, 6–3, 6–4
Rogers Cup; Toronto, Canada; ATP 1000; Hard, outdoor 9 – 15 August 2010	56 / 548	SF	(United Kingdom) Andy Murray (4)	4	Loss	3–6, 4–6
W&S Financial Group Masters; Cincinnati, United States; ATP 1000; Hard, outdoor 16 – 22 August 2010
W&S Financial Group Masters; Cincinnati, United States; ATP 1000; Hard, outdoor 16 – 22 August 2010	–	1R	Bye			
W&S Financial Group Masters; Cincinnati, United States; ATP 1000; Hard, outdoor 16 – 22 August 2010	57 / 549	2R	(United States) Taylor Dent (Q)	83	Win	6–2, 7–5
W&S Financial Group Masters; Cincinnati, United States; ATP 1000; Hard, outdoor 16 – 22 August 2010	58 / 550	3R	(France) Julien Benneteau	32	Win	5–7, 7–6^{(8–6)}, 6–2
W&S Financial Group Masters; Cincinnati, United States; ATP 1000; Hard, outdoor 16 – 22 August 2010	59 / 551	QF	(Cyprus) Marcos Baghdatis	20	Loss	4–6, 6–4, 4–6
US Open; New York City, United States; Grand Slam tournament Hard, outdoor 30 August – 12 September 2010
US Open; New York City, United States; Grand Slam tournament Hard, outdoor 30 August – 12 September 2010	60 / 552	1R	(Russia) Teymuraz Gabashvili	93	Win	7–6^{(7–4)}, 7–6^{(7–4)}, 6–3
US Open; New York City, United States; Grand Slam tournament Hard, outdoor 30 August – 12 September 2010	61 / 553	2R	(Uzbekistan) Denis Istomin	39	Win	6–2, 7–6^{(7–5)}, 7–5
US Open; New York City, United States; Grand Slam tournament Hard, outdoor 30 August – 12 September 2010	62 / 554	3R	(France) Gilles Simon	42	Win	6–4, 6–4, 6–2
US Open; New York City, United States; Grand Slam tournament Hard, outdoor 30 August – 12 September 2010	63 / 555	4R	(Spain) Feliciano López (23)	25	Win	6–3, 6–4, 6–4
US Open; New York City, United States; Grand Slam tournament Hard, outdoor 30 August – 12 September 2010	64 / 556	QF	(Spain) Fernando Verdasco (8)	8	Win	7–5, 6–3, 6–4
US Open; New York City, United States; Grand Slam tournament Hard, outdoor 30 August – 12 September 2010	65 / 557	SF	(Russia) Mikhail Youzhny (12)	14	Win	6–2, 6–3, 6–4
US Open; New York City, United States; Grand Slam tournament Hard, outdoor 30 August – 12 September 2010	66 / 558	W	(Serbia) Novak Djokovic (3)	3	Win (6)	6–4, 5–7, 6–4, 6–2
PTT Thailand Open; Bangkok, Thailand; ATP 250; Hard, indoor 27 September – 3 October 2010
PTT Thailand Open; Bangkok, Thailand; ATP 250; Hard, indoor 27 September – 3 October 2010	–	1R	Bye			
PTT Thailand Open; Bangkok, Thailand; ATP 250; Hard, indoor 27 September – 3 October 2010	67 / 559	2R	(Belgium) Ruben Bemelmans (Q)	195	Win	6–1, 6–4
PTT Thailand Open; Bangkok, Thailand; ATP 250; Hard, indoor 27 September – 3 October 2010	68 / 560	QF	(Kazakhstan) Mikhail Kukushkin	83	Win	6–2, 6–3
PTT Thailand Open; Bangkok, Thailand; ATP 250; Hard, indoor 27 September – 3 October 2010	69 / 561	SF	(Spain) Guillermo García López	53	Loss	6–2, 6–7^{(3–7)}, 3–6
Japan Open Tennis Championships; Tokyo, Japan; ATP 500; Hard, outdoor 4 – 10 October 2010
Japan Open Tennis Championships; Tokyo, Japan; ATP 500; Hard, outdoor 4 – 10 October 2010	70 / 562	1R	(Colombia) Santiago Giraldo	63	Win	6–4, 6–4
Japan Open Tennis Championships; Tokyo, Japan; ATP 500; Hard, outdoor 4 – 10 October 2010	71 / 563	2R	(Canada) Milos Raonic (Q)	200	Win	6–4, 6–4
Japan Open Tennis Championships; Tokyo, Japan; ATP 500; Hard, outdoor 4 – 10 October 2010	72 / 564	QF	(Russia) Dmitry Tursunov	432	Win	6–4, 6–1
Japan Open Tennis Championships; Tokyo, Japan; ATP 500; Hard, outdoor 4 – 10 October 2010	73 / 565	SF	(Serbia) Viktor Troicki	54	Win	7–6^{(7–4)}, 4–6, 7–6^{(9–7)}
Japan Open Tennis Championships; Tokyo, Japan; ATP 500; Hard, outdoor 4 – 10 October 2010	74 / 566	W	(France) Gaël Monfils (5)	15	Win (7)	6–1, 7–5
Shanghai Rolex Masters; Shanghai, China; ATP 1000; Hard, outdoor 11 – 17 October 2010
Shanghai Rolex Masters; Shanghai, China; ATP 1000; Hard, outdoor 11 – 17 October 2010	–	1R	Bye			
Shanghai Rolex Masters; Shanghai, China; ATP 1000; Hard, outdoor 11 – 17 October 2010	75 / 567	2R	(Switzerland) Stanislas Wawrinka	21	Win	6–4, 6–4
Shanghai Rolex Masters; Shanghai, China; ATP 1000; Hard, outdoor 11 – 17 October 2010	76 / 568	3R	(Austria) Jürgen Melzer (13)	12	Loss	1–6, 6–3, 3–6
Barclays ATP World Tour Finals; London, United Kingdom; ATP Finals; Hard, indoor 22 – 28 November 2010
Barclays ATP World Tour Finals; London, United Kingdom; ATP Finals; Hard, indoor 22 – 28 November 2010	77 / 569	RR	(United States) Andy Roddick (8)	8	Win	3–6, 7–6^{(7–5)}, 6–4
Barclays ATP World Tour Finals; London, United Kingdom; ATP Finals; Hard, indoor 22 – 28 November 2010	78 / 570	RR	(Serbia) Novak Djokovic (3)	3	Win	7–5, 6–2
Barclays ATP World Tour Finals; London, United Kingdom; ATP Finals; Hard, indoor 22 – 28 November 2010	79 / 571	RR	(Czech Republic) Tomáš Berdych (6)	6	Win	7–6^{(7–3)}, 6–1
Barclays ATP World Tour Finals; London, United Kingdom; ATP Finals; Hard, indoor 22 – 28 November 2010	80 / 572	SF	(United Kingdom) Andy Murray (5)	5	Win	7–6^{(7–5)}, 3–6, 7–6^{(8–6)}
Barclays ATP World Tour Finals; London, United Kingdom; ATP Finals; Hard, indoor 22 – 28 November 2010	81 / 573	F	(Switzerland) Roger Federer (2)	2	Loss (2)	3–6, 6–3, 1–6

Source (ATP)

=== Doubles ===
Tournament	Match	Round	Opponents (seed or key)	Ranks	Result	Score
Qatar Open; Doha, Qatar; ATP 250; Hard, outdoor 4 – 9 January 2010; Partner: (Spain) Marc López
Qatar Open; Doha, Qatar; ATP 250; Hard, outdoor 4 – 9 January 2010; Partner: (Spain) Marc López	1 / 127	1R	(Poland) Mariusz Fyrstenberg / (Poland) Marcin Matkowski (3)	#18 / #17	Loss	6–4, 2–6, [3–10]
BNP Paribas Open; Indian Wells, United States; ATP 1000; Hard, outdoor 8 – 21 March 2010; Partner: (Spain) Marc López
BNP Paribas Open; Indian Wells, United States; ATP 1000; Hard, outdoor 8 – 21 March 2010; Partner: (Spain) Marc López	2 / 128	1R	(Czech Republic) Lukáš Dlouhý / (India) Leander Paes (3)	#5 / #6	Win	6–4, 3–6, [10–6]
BNP Paribas Open; Indian Wells, United States; ATP 1000; Hard, outdoor 8 – 21 March 2010; Partner: (Spain) Marc López	3 / 129	2R	(Spain) Feliciano López / (Spain) Fernando Verdasco	#78 / #164	Win	6–4, 7–6^{(7–4)}
BNP Paribas Open; Indian Wells, United States; ATP 1000; Hard, outdoor 8 – 21 March 2010; Partner: (Spain) Marc López	4 / 130	QF	(France) Michaël Llodra / (Israel) Andy Ram	#47 / #9	Win	6–2, 6–4
BNP Paribas Open; Indian Wells, United States; ATP 1000; Hard, outdoor 8 – 21 March 2010; Partner: (Spain) Marc López	5 / 131	SF	(Sweden) Simon Aspelin / (Australia) Paul Hanley (6)	#15 / #20	Win	6–4, 6–4
BNP Paribas Open; Indian Wells, United States; ATP 1000; Hard, outdoor 8 – 21 March 2010; Partner: (Spain) Marc López	6 / 132	W	(Canada) Daniel Nestor / (Serbia) Nenad Zimonjić (1)	#1 / #1	Win (1)	7–6^{(10–8)}, 6–3
Sony Ericsson Open; Miami, United States; ATP 1000; Hard, outdoor 22 March – 4 April 2010; Partner: (Spain) Bartolomé Salvá Vidal
Sony Ericsson Open; Miami, United States; ATP 1000; Hard, outdoor 22 March – 4 April 2010; Partner: (Spain) Bartolomé Salvá Vidal	7 / 133	1R	(United States) Bob Bryan / (United States) Mike Bryan (2)	#3 / #3	Loss	0–6, 3–6
Aegon Championships; London, United Kingdom; ATP 250; Grass, outdoor 7 – 13 June 2010; Partner: (Spain) Marc López
Aegon Championships; London, United Kingdom; ATP 250; Grass, outdoor 7 – 13 June 2010; Partner: (Spain) Marc López	8 / 134	1R	(Germany) Rainer Schüttler / (Serbia) Janko Tipsarević	#211 / #127	Win	6–4, 6–3
Aegon Championships; London, United Kingdom; ATP 250; Grass, outdoor 7 – 13 June 2010; Partner: (Spain) Marc López	–	2R	(Sweden) Robert Lindstedt / (Romania) Horia Tecău (6)	#29 / #42	Withdrew	N/A
Rogers Cup; Toronto, Canada; ATP 1000; Hard, outdoor 7 – 15 August 2010; Partner: (Serbia) Novak Djokovic
Rogers Cup; Toronto, Canada; ATP 1000; Hard, outdoor 7 – 15 August 2010; Partner: (Serbia) Novak Djokovic	9 / 135	1R	(Canada) Vasek Pospisil / (Canada) Milos Raonic (WC)	#178 / #492	Loss	7–5, 3–6, [8–10]

Source (ATP)

=== Exhibitions ===
Tournament	Match	Round	Opponent (seed or key)	Rank	Result	Score
Capitala World Tennis Championship; Abu Dhabi, United Arab Emirates Hard, outdoor 31 December 2009 – 2 January 2010
Capitala World Tennis Championship; Abu Dhabi, United Arab Emirates Hard, outdoor 31 December 2009 – 2 January 2010	–	QF	Bye			
Capitala World Tennis Championship; Abu Dhabi, United Arab Emirates Hard, outdoor 31 December 2009 – 2 January 2010	1	SF	(Spain) David Ferrer (5)	17	Win	7–6^{(7–3)}, 6–3
Capitala World Tennis Championship; Abu Dhabi, United Arab Emirates Hard, outdoor 31 December 2009 – 2 January 2010	2	W	(Sweden) Robin Söderling (4)	8	Win	7–6^{(7–3)}, 7–5

== See also ==
- 2010 ATP Tour
- 2010 Roger Federer tennis season
- 2010 Novak Djokovic tennis season
