= 2010 Roger Federer tennis season =

Statistics for Swiss tennis player

- Full name: Roger Federer
- Country: Switzerland
- Calendar prize money: $7,698,289

Singles
- Season record: 65–13
- Calendar titles: 5
- Year-end ranking: 2
- Ranking change from previous year: ▼1

Grand Slam & significant results
- Australian Open: W
- French Open: QF
- Wimbledon: QF
- US Open: SF
- Other tournaments
- Tour Finals: W

Doubles
- Season record: 2–2 (50%)
- Calendar titles: 0
- Year-end ranking: 327
- Last updated on: 31 December 2010.

Roger Federer's 2010 season was punctuated by his victory at the Australian Open, beating Andy Murray in the final. Federer played in 18 tournaments in 2010 and won five. He was runner-up in the Mutua Madrileña Madrid Open to Rafael Nadal. At the French Open, he faced his opponent in the previous year's final, Robin Söderling, at the quarterfinals stage and lost. As defending champion at Wimbledon, he was defeated in the quarterfinals by Tomáš Berdych in four sets, thus ending his streak of seven consecutive Wimbledon finals and also falling to world No. 3, his lowest ranking since 2003. During the summer hard-court season, Federer hired Paul Annacone to be his coach and revive his form. At the 2010 US Open, Federer advanced to his seventh straight semifinal appearance, but lost to Novak Djokovic in five sets, despite holding two match points in the final set. Federer's ranking slipped back from No. 2 to No. 3 after the tournament, but he finished the year strong with victories in Stockholm, Basel, and the ATP Tour Finals to pass Djokovic in the rankings and finish the year at world No. 2. At that time, Federer had earned wide consideration as the greatest male tennis player of all time.

== Year summary ==
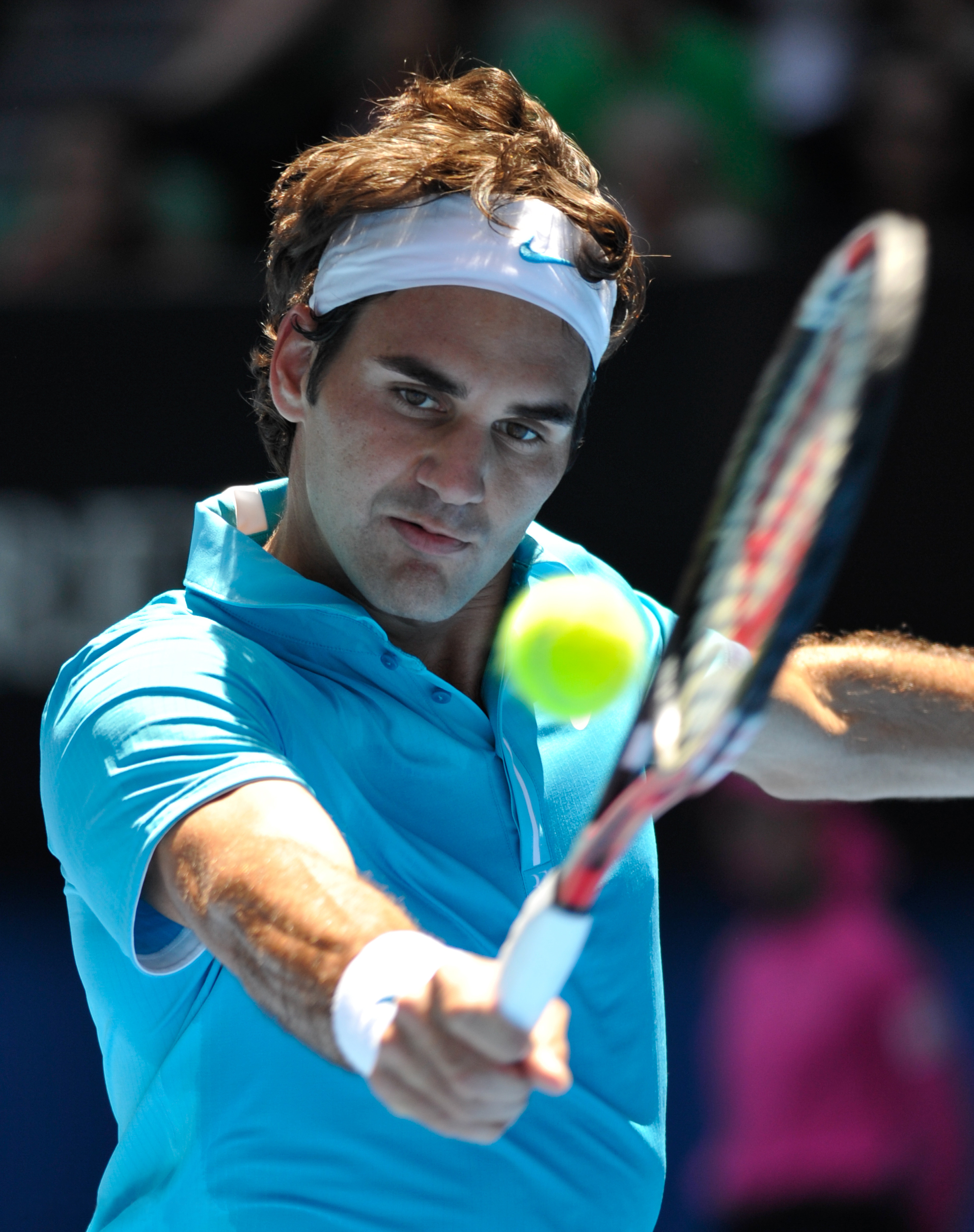
Federer won the 2010 Australian Open, which was his fourth victory at the tournament, tying Andre Agassi for the most in the Open Era. It was his 16th Grand Slam career title.

=== Early hard court season and Australian Open ===
On Sunday, January 17, Federer created a charity tournament called the "Hit for Haiti" at the Rod Laver Arena the day before the Australian Open. He invited a number of top world players from the ATP and WTA tours to join him to raise money for relief efforts in Haiti. The players who participated included Federer, Rafael Nadal, Andy Roddick, Novak Djokovic, Kim Clijsters, Serena Williams, Lleyton Hewitt, and Samantha Stosur. A few days before the start of Indian Wells, Federer, Nadal, 14-time Grand Slam singles champion Pete Sampras, and 8-time Grand Slam singles champion Agassi participated in a doubles exhibition match called "Hit for Haiti 2" as a fundraiser for the relief efforts in Haiti. Also in February, Federer made a trip to Ethiopia, where his charity foundation works.

Federer started the year by playing in the Qatar ExxonMobil Open in Doha, where he was defeated in the semifinals by eventual champion Nikolay Davydenko.

Federer won his 16th Grand Slam singles title at the Australian Open. In the fourth round, Federer beat Lleyton Hewitt in straight sets. In the quarterfinals, Federer trailed Davydenko by a set and two games in the second set, but was able to win in four sets. Federer then defeated world no. 10 and 2008 Australian Open runner-up Jo-Wilfried Tsonga in the semifinals in straight sets. This marked the 23rd consecutive time that Federer had appeared in a semifinal of a Grand Slam tournament, and the seventh consecutive year that Federer had made at least the semifinals at the Australian Open, breaking the previous record held by Ivan Lendl. In the final, Federer defeated fifth-seeded Andy Murray in straight sets to claim his fourth Australian Open singles title. This win tied him for most Australian Open victories in the open era at four with Andre Agassi. Since Wimbledon 2005 Federer had made the finals of 18 out of 19 Grand Slam tournaments, an extraordinary period of sustained excellence unparalleled in the Open Era.

Federer withdrew from the Barclays Dubai Tennis Championships for the second consecutive year due to a lung infection.

Federer then appeared at the BNP Paribas Open in Indian Wells for his first tournament since the Australian Open. Along with the 31 seeded players behind him, Federer received a first round bye in the main draw. However, in the third round, he was defeated by Marcos Baghdatis in a rematch of the 2006 Australian Open final, after Federer failed to convert three match points.

The week after Indian Wells, Federer played in the Sony Ericsson Open in Miami. Federer and the other 31 seeded players received first-round byes. In the second round, Federer defeated Nicolás Lapentti before over 14,000 fans, a record-breaking attendance for a second round match in the Stadium (the center court of Miami). After beating Florent Serra, Federer lost to the eventual runner-up, Czech Tomáš Berdych, in three sets in the fourth round. Federer hit 62 unforced errors in that match.

=== Clay court season and French Open ===
Federer next appeared in the Internazionali BNL d'Italia in Rome. In addition to singles, he teamed with Yves Allegro for the doubles competition as wildcards. The team lost in the quarterfinals to Sam Querrey and John Isner. Federer lost to world no. 40 Gulbis in the second round of the singles competition, after receiving a first-round bye. It was the first time since 2000 that Federer had lost his opening clay-court match of the year. It was the first time since 2002 that he had lost before the quarterfinals at three consecutive events, and the first time since 2002 that he had lost his first match in Rome.

Federer then played the Estoril Open. In his only previous appearance in 2008, he won the title, when Davydenko retired in the final. However, he lost in the semifinals this year to Albert Montañés in straight sets, after which Federer said he was not worried by his current form, while Nadal expressed surprise at his rival's loss.

Federer continued at the Mutua Madrileña Madrid Open, where he was the defending champion. He defeated his 2008 Olympic doubles partner Stanislas Wawrinka in the third round. In the quarterfinals, he avenged his earlier loss to Gulbis. In the semifinals, he defeated David Ferrer in three sets. Federer then lost to Nadal in the final in straight sets.

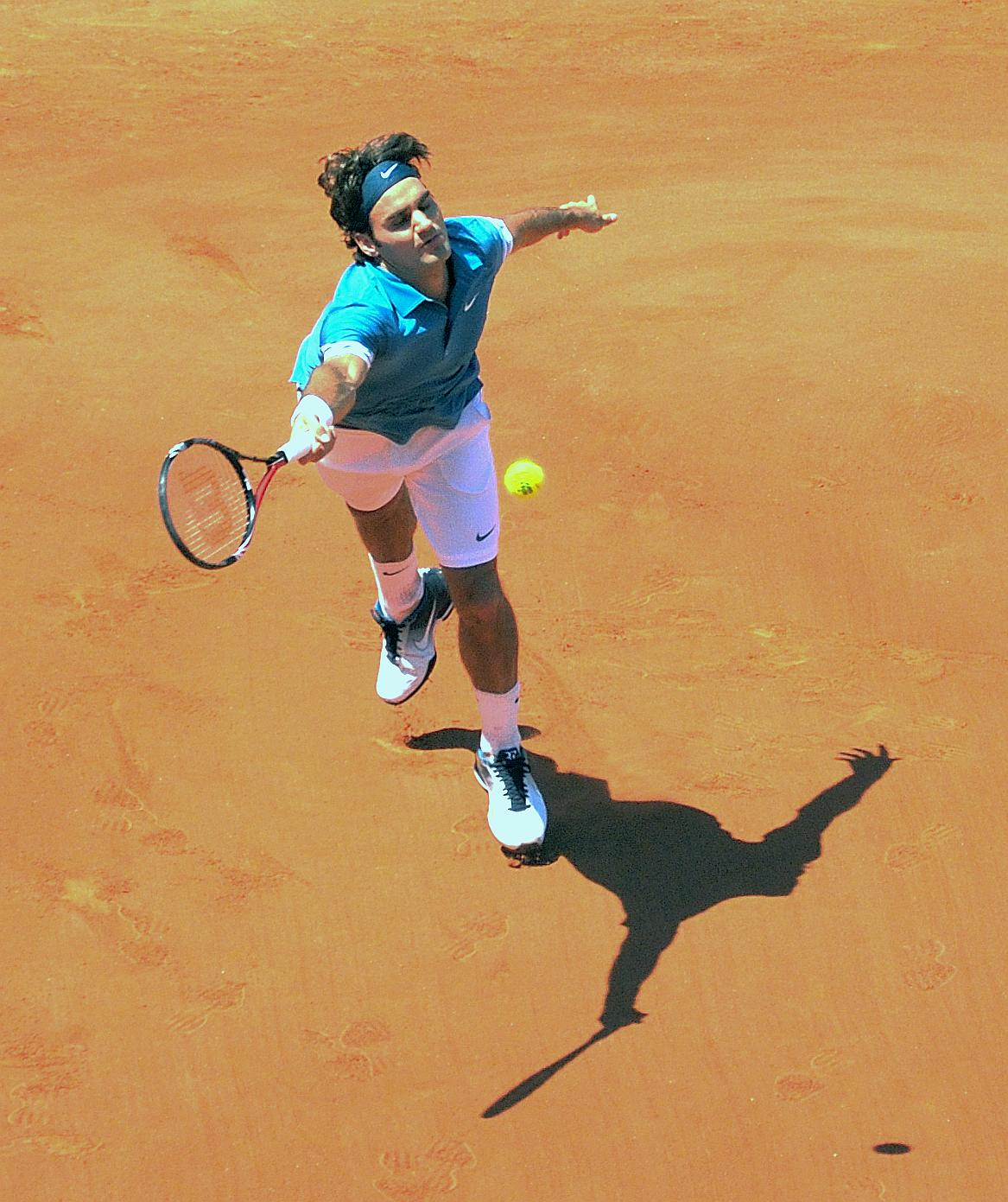
Federer at the 2010 French Open

In the third round of the French Open, Federer beat Julian Reister to register his 700th ATP-level match victory and 150th on clay. He followed this milestone by defeating Wawrinka in the fourth round. Federer lost in the quarterfinals to Robin Söderling, ending his six-year streak of consecutive Grand Slam semifinals. Moreover, after the end of tournament, he lost the world no. 1 ranking to Nadal, leaving Federer at 285 weeks of being world no. 1, with Sampras holding the record of 286 weeks at that time.

=== Grass court season and Wimbledon ===
Federer next played at the Gerry Weber Open, where he lost to Hewitt in the final in three sets. In doubles, Federer and Allegro lost in the first round to Christopher Kas and Philipp Kohlschreiber.

Next, Federer attempted to defend his title at the Wimbledon Championships. Since Wimbledon has a different formula for seedings based on grass-court achievements, Federer was seeded first above world no. 1 Rafael Nadal. In the first round, Federer won for the 200th occasion in Grand Slam matches as he came from two sets down to beat Alejandro Falla, who served for the match in the fourth set at that time, but Falla took Federer to another set before Federer won in a quick fifth set. Federer beat Ilija Bozoljac in four sets. He next faced Arnaud Clément and had a straight-set victory. In the fourth round, Federer defeated no. 16 seed Jürgen Melzer. In the quarterfinals, he faced Tomáš Berdych, but lost in four sets. With this defeat, Federer became ranked no. 3 at the end of Wimbledon, which was his lowest ranking since November 10, 2003.

=== US Open Series and US Open ===
During Federer's summer break between Wimbledon and Canada, he hired Pete Sampras' old coach Paul Annacone to attempt to revive his fortune, to start with on a trial period. After beating Chela in his first match at the 2010 Rogers Cup, Federer broke Andre Agassi's record for Master level wins as he won his 210th match. Federer then overcame quarterfinal and semifinal challenges from Berdych and Djokovic respectively, winning the first set of both matches before dropping the second and having to fight hard to capture the decider. His triumph over Djokovic, the world no. 2, ensured that he would reclaim that ranking, regardless of the outcome of his final showdown with Murray, the defending champion. Federer lost in the final, 5–7, 5–7. A week later, Federer played in the 2010 Western & Southern Financial Group Masters in Cincinnati, Ohio, still seeded third behind Nadal and Djokovic, but competing as world no. 2 for the first time since Wimbledon. He received a bye in the first round, and then got another break when Uzbekistan second-round opponent Denis Istomin was forced to retire in the first set. He advanced to the quarterfinals in a walkover, when Philipp Kohlschreiber of Germany pulled out, citing a shoulder injury. He defeated frequent tour opponent and world no. 6 Nikolay Davydenko and advanced to the semifinals. He defeated Marcos Baghdatis and advanced to the finals. There he defeated Mardy Fish and successfully defended the title. Federer began his quest for a sixth U.S. Open title with an easy win over Brian Dabul. Federer next beat Andreas Beck. In the third round, Federer defeated Paul-Henri Mathieu. In the round of 16, Federer faced Roland Garros semifinalist Jürgen Melzer and won in straight sets. Then, in the quarterfinals, he faced Robin Söderling, who had recently beaten him in the quarterfinals of the 2010 French Open, and defeated him. He narrowly lost to Novak Djokovic in the semifinals after failing to convert two match points in the final set. As a result, Djokovic rose to no. 2 in the world and Federer fell to no. 3. By reaching the semifinals, Federer achieved his 20th match win in 2010 Grand Slams; this is the seventh consecutive year he has accomplished this feat, a record matched only by Ivan Lendl.

=== Asian swing ===
Federer competed at the ATP Masters 1000 Shanghai, where he was seeded third and had a bye in the first round. Federer defeated John Isner and Andreas Seppi to advance to the quarterfinals, where he defeated world no. 5 Robin Söderling. He avenged his last US open loss against Djokovic. However, in the final, Federer fell to Murray.

=== European indoor season ===
His next tournament was the Stockholm Open. He got a bye in the first round, defeated the American Taylor Dent in the next round, and defeated fellow Swiss Stanislas Wawrinka afterwards. Up next in the semifinals was Ivan Ljubičić, whom Federer beat in two sets. Federer won his 64th Tour-level title, tying with Pete Sampras for fourth place on the Open Era titles list, as he beat Florian Mayer in the final to win his first Stockholm crown.

He next participated at the 2010 Davidoff Swiss Indoors as the top seed. He defeated Djokovic the final, to win a record fourth title at the event. This was his 65th career title, placing him fourth in the all-time list, surpassing Pete Sampras' record of 64 career titles. At the BNP Paribas Masters, Federer reached the semifinals for the first time, where he lost to Gaël Monfils despite holding five match points.

At the 2010 ATP World Tour Finals, Federer was placed in Group B, along with Andy Murray, Robin Söderling, and David Ferrer. He defeated Ferrer in his first round-robin match. He then defeated Murray and defeated Söderling in his final round-robin match. These straight-set wins marked the first time Federer completed the round-robin stage without dropping a set. He was the winner of Group B and qualified for the semifinals. In the semifinals, he beat Novak Djokovic to advance to his sixth year-end championship final, where he faced his longtime rival Rafael Nadal. Federer retained his unbeaten record against Nadal at the ATP World Tour Finals by defeating the top seed in the final. Federer then had five season-ending championships to his name, tying Pete Sampras and Ivan Lendl for the most ever. Federer ended the year ranked world No. 2 and played Nadal in two charity matches, one in Zürich and one in Madrid. The proceeds benefited his own foundation, as well as Nadal's foundation. By the end of 2010 he widely became considered as the greatest player of all time.

== Matches ==
=== Grand Slam performance ===
Tournament	Round	Result	Opponent	Score
Australian Open	1R	Win	(Russia) Igor Andreev	4–6, 6–2, 7–6^{(7–2)}, 6–0
Australian Open	2R	Win	(Romania) Victor Hănescu	6–2, 6–3, 6–2
Australian Open	3R	Win	(Spain) Albert Montañés	6–3, 6–4, 6–4
Australian Open	4R	Win	(Australia) Lleyton Hewitt	6–2, 6–3, 6–4
Australian Open	QF	Win	(Russia) Nikolay Davydenko	2–6, 6–3, 6–0, 7–5
Australian Open	SF	Win	(France) Jo-Wilfried Tsonga	6–2, 6–3, 6–2
Australian Open	W	Win (16)	(United Kingdom) Andy Murray	6–3, 6–4, 7–6^{(13–11)}
French Open	1R	Win	(Australia) Peter Luczak	6–4, 6–1, 6–2
French Open	2R	Win	(Colombia) Alejandro Falla	7–6^{(7–4)}, 6–2, 6–4
French Open	3R	Win	(Germany) Julian Reister	6–4, 6–0, 6–4
French Open	4R	Win	(Switzerland) Stanislas Wawrinka	6–3, 7–6^{(7–5)}, 6–2
French Open	QF	Loss	(Sweden) Robin Söderling	6–3, 3–6, 5–7, 4–6
Wimbledon	1R	Win	(Colombia) Alejandro Falla	5–7, 4–6, 6–4, 7–6^{(7–1)}, 6–0
Wimbledon	2R	Win	(Serbia) Ilija Bozoljac	6–3, 6–7^{(4–7)}, 6–4, 7–6^{(7–5)}
Wimbledon	3R	Win	(France) Arnaud Clément	6–2, 6–4, 6–2
Wimbledon	4R	Win	(Austria) Jürgen Melzer	6–3, 6–2, 6–3
Wimbledon	QF	Loss	(Czech Republic) Tomáš Berdych	4–6, 6–3, 1–6, 4–6
US Open	1R	Win	(Argentina) Brian Dabul	6–1, 6–4, 6–2
US Open	2R	Win	(Germany) Andreas Beck	6–3, 6–4, 6–3
US Open	3R	Win	(France) Paul-Henri Mathieu	6–4, 6–3, 6–3
US Open	4R	Win	(Austria) Jürgen Melzer	6–3, 7–6^{(7–4)}, 6–3
US Open	QF	Win	(Sweden) Robin Söderling	6–4, 6–4, 7–5
US Open	SF	Loss	(Serbia) Novak Djokovic	7–5, 1–6, 7–5, 2–6, 5–7

=== All matches ===
==== Singles ====
Tournament	Match	Round	Opponent	Rank	Result	Score
Qatar Open, Doha; Qatar; 250; Hard, outdoor 4 January	840	1R	(Belgium) Christophe Rochus	86	Win	6–1, 6–2
Qatar Open, Doha; Qatar; 250; Hard, outdoor 4 January	841	2R	(Russia) Evgeny Korolev	53	Win	6–2, 6–4
Qatar Open, Doha; Qatar; 250; Hard, outdoor 4 January	842	QF	(Latvia) Ernests Gulbis	90	Win	6–2, 4–6, 6–4
Qatar Open, Doha; Qatar; 250; Hard, outdoor 4 January	843	SF	(Russia) Nikolay Davydenko	6	Loss	4–6, 4–6
Australian Open, Melbourne; Australia; Grand Slam; Hard, outdoor 18 January	844	1R	(Russia) Igor Andreev	37	Win	4–6, 6–2, 7–6^{(7–2)}, 6–0
Australian Open, Melbourne; Australia; Grand Slam; Hard, outdoor 18 January	845	2R	(Romania) Victor Hănescu	47	Win	6–2, 6–3, 6–2
Australian Open, Melbourne; Australia; Grand Slam; Hard, outdoor 18 January	846	3R	(Spain) Albert Montañés	32	Win	6–3, 6–4, 6–4
Australian Open, Melbourne; Australia; Grand Slam; Hard, outdoor 18 January	847	4R	(Australia) Lleyton Hewitt	22	Win	6–2, 6–3, 6–4
Australian Open, Melbourne; Australia; Grand Slam; Hard, outdoor 18 January	848	QF	(Russia) Nikolay Davydenko	6	Win	2–6, 6–3, 6–0, 7–5
Australian Open, Melbourne; Australia; Grand Slam; Hard, outdoor 18 January	849	SF	(France) Jo-Wilfried Tsonga	10	Win	6–2, 6–3, 6–2
Australian Open, Melbourne; Australia; Grand Slam; Hard, outdoor 18 January	850	W	(United Kingdom) Andy Murray	4	Win (1)	6–3, 6–4, 7–6^{(13–11)}
Indian Wells Masters, Indian Wells; USA; Masters 1000; Outdoor, hard 8 March	–	1R	Bye			
Indian Wells Masters, Indian Wells; USA; Masters 1000; Outdoor, hard 8 March	851	2R	(Romania) Victor Hănescu	43	Win	6–3, 6–7^{(5–7)}, 6–1
Indian Wells Masters, Indian Wells; USA; Masters 1000; Outdoor, hard 8 March	852	3R	(Cyprus) Marcos Baghdatis	33	Loss	7–5, 5–7, 6–7^{(4–7)}
Miami Open, Miami; USA; Masters 1000; Outdoor, hard 22 March	–	1R	Bye			
Miami Open, Miami; USA; Masters 1000; Outdoor, hard 22 March	853	2R	(Ecuador) Nicolás Lapentti	102	Win	6–3, 6–3
Miami Open, Miami; USA; Masters 1000; Outdoor, hard 22 March	854	3R	(France) Florent Serra	61	Win	7–6^{(7–2)}, 7–6^{(7–3)}
Miami Open, Miami; USA; Masters 1000; Outdoor, hard 22 March	855	4R	(Czech Republic) Tomáš Berdych	20	Loss	4–6, 7–6^{(7–3)}, 6–7^{(6–8)}
Italian Open, Rome; Italy; Masters 1000; Clay, outdoor 25 April	–	1R	Bye			
Italian Open, Rome; Italy; Masters 1000; Clay, outdoor 25 April	856	2R	(Latvia) Ernests Gulbis	40	Loss	6–2, 1–6, 5–7
Estoril Open, Estoril; Portugal; 250; Clay, outdoor 3 May	–	1R	Bye			
Estoril Open, Estoril; Portugal; 250; Clay, outdoor 3 May	857	2R	(Germany) Björn Phau	138	Win	6–3, 6–4
Estoril Open, Estoril; Portugal; 250; Clay, outdoor 3 May	858	QF	(France) Arnaud Clément	83	Win	7–6^{(9–7)}, 6–2
Estoril Open, Estoril; Portugal; 250; Clay, outdoor 3 May	859	SF	(Spain) Albert Montañés	34	Loss	2–6, 6–7^{(5–7)}
Madrid Open, Madrid; Spain; Masters 1000; Clay, outdoor 9 May	–	1R	Bye			
Madrid Open, Madrid; Spain; Masters 1000; Clay, outdoor 9 May	860	2R	(Germany) Benjamin Becker	46	Win	6–2, 7–6^{(7–4)}
Madrid Open, Madrid; Spain; Masters 1000; Clay, outdoor 9 May	861	3R	(Switzerland) Stanislas Wawrinka	23	Win	6–3, 6–1
Madrid Open, Madrid; Spain; Masters 1000; Clay, outdoor 9 May	862	QF	(Latvia) Ernests Gulbis	34	Win	3–6, 6–1, 6–4
Madrid Open, Madrid; Spain; Masters 1000; Clay, outdoor 9 May	863	SF	(Spain) David Ferrer	12	Win	7–5, 3–6, 6–3
Madrid Open, Madrid; Spain; Masters 1000; Clay, outdoor 9 May	864	F	(Spain) Rafael Nadal	3	Loss (1)	4–6, 6–7^{(5–7)}
French Open, Paris; France; Grand Slam; Clay, outdoor 23 May	865	1R	(Australia) Peter Luczak	71	Win	6–4, 6–1, 6–2
French Open, Paris; France; Grand Slam; Clay, outdoor 23 May	866	2R	(Colombia) Alejandro Falla	70	Win	7–6^{(7–4)}, 6–2, 6–4
French Open, Paris; France; Grand Slam; Clay, outdoor 23 May	867	3R	(Germany) Julian Reister	165	Win	6–4, 6–0, 6–4
French Open, Paris; France; Grand Slam; Clay, outdoor 23 May	868	4R	(Switzerland) Stanislas Wawrinka	24	Win	6–3, 7–6^{(7–5)}, 6–2
French Open, Paris; France; Grand Slam; Clay, outdoor 23 May	869	QF	(Sweden) Robin Söderling	7	Loss	6–3, 3–6, 5–7, 4–6
Halle Open, Halle; Germany; 250; Grass, outdoor 7 June	870	1R	(Finland) Jarkko Nieminen	65	Win	6–4, 6–4
Halle Open, Halle; Germany; 250; Grass, outdoor 7 June	871	2R	(Colombia) Alejandro Falla	67	Win	6–1, 6–2
Halle Open, Halle; Germany; 250; Grass, outdoor 7 June	872	QF	(Germany) Philipp Kohlschreiber	35	Win	7–5, 6–3
Halle Open, Halle; Germany; 250; Grass, outdoor 7 June	873	SF	(Germany) Philipp Petzschner	41	Win	7–6^{(7–3)}, 6–4
Halle Open, Halle; Germany; 250; Grass, outdoor 7 June	874	F	(Australia) Lleyton Hewitt	32	Loss (2)	6–3, 6–7^{(4–7)}, 4–6
Wimbledon Championships, London; Great Britain; Grand Slam; Grass, outdoor 21 June	875	1R	(Colombia) Alejandro Falla	60	Win	5–7, 4–6, 6–4, 7–6^{(7–1)}, 6–0
Wimbledon Championships, London; Great Britain; Grand Slam; Grass, outdoor 21 June	876	2R	(Serbia) Ilija Bozoljac	152	Win	6–3, 6–7^{(4–7)}, 6–4, 7–6^{(7–5)}
Wimbledon Championships, London; Great Britain; Grand Slam; Grass, outdoor 21 June	877	3R	(France) Arnaud Clément	86	Win	6–2, 6–4, 6–2
Wimbledon Championships, London; Great Britain; Grand Slam; Grass, outdoor 21 June	878	4R	(Austria) Jürgen Melzer	16	Win	6–3, 6–2, 6–3
Wimbledon Championships, London; Great Britain; Grand Slam; Grass, outdoor 21 June	879	QF	(Czech Republic) Tomáš Berdych	13	Loss	4–6, 6–3, 1–6, 4–6
Canadian Open, Toronto; Canada; Masters 1000; Hard, outdoor 11 August	–	1R	Bye			
Canadian Open, Toronto; Canada; Masters 1000; Hard, outdoor 11 August	880	2R	(Argentina) Juan Ignacio Chela	50	Win	7–6^{(9–7)}, 6–3
Canadian Open, Toronto; Canada; Masters 1000; Hard, outdoor 11 August	881	3R	(France) Michaël Llodra	35	Win	7–6^{(7–2)}, 6–3
Canadian Open, Toronto; Canada; Masters 1000; Hard, outdoor 11 August	882	QF	(Czech Republic) Tomáš Berdych	7	Win	6–3, 5–7, 7–6^{(7–5)}
Canadian Open, Toronto; Canada; Masters 1000; Hard, outdoor 11 August	883	SF	(Serbia) Novak Djokovic	2	Win	6–1, 3–6, 7–5
Canadian Open, Toronto; Canada; Masters 1000; Hard, outdoor 11 August	884	F	(United Kingdom) Andy Murray	4	Loss (3)	5–7, 5–7
Cincinnati Masters, Cincinnati; USA; Masters 1000; Hard, outdoor 16 August	–	1R	Bye			
Cincinnati Masters, Cincinnati; USA; Masters 1000; Hard, outdoor 16 August	885	2R	(Uzbekistan) Denis Istomin	53	Win	5–2, RET
Cincinnati Masters, Cincinnati; USA; Masters 1000; Hard, outdoor 16 August	–	3R	(Germany) Philipp Kohlschreiber	33	Walkover	N/A
Cincinnati Masters, Cincinnati; USA; Masters 1000; Hard, outdoor 16 August	886	QF	(Russia) Nikolay Davydenko	6	Win	6–4, 7–5
Cincinnati Masters, Cincinnati; USA; Masters 1000; Hard, outdoor 16 August	887	SF	(Cyprus) Marcos Baghdatis	20	Win	6–4, 6–3
Cincinnati Masters, Cincinnati; USA; Masters 1000; Hard, outdoor 16 August	888	W	(United States) Mardy Fish	36	Win (2)	6–7^{(5–7)}, 7–6^{(7–1)}, 6–4
US Open, New York; USA; Grand Slam; Hard, outdoor 30 August	889	1R	(Argentina) Brian Dabul	96	Win	6–1, 6–4, 6–2
US Open, New York; USA; Grand Slam; Hard, outdoor 30 August	890	2R	(Germany) Andreas Beck	104	Win	6–3, 6–4, 6–3
US Open, New York; USA; Grand Slam; Hard, outdoor 30 August	891	3R	(France) Paul-Henri Mathieu	109	Win	6–4, 6–3, 6–3
US Open, New York; USA; Grand Slam; Hard, outdoor 30 August	892	4R	(Austria) Jürgen Melzer	15	Win	6–3, 7–6^{(7–4)}, 6–3
US Open, New York; USA; Grand Slam; Hard, outdoor 30 August	893	QF	(Sweden) Robin Söderling	5	Win	6–4, 6–4, 7–5
US Open, New York; USA; Grand Slam; Hard, outdoor 30 August	894	SF	(Serbia) Novak Djokovic	3	Loss	7–5, 1–6, 7–5, 2–6, 5–7
Shanghai Masters, Shanghai; China; Masters 1000; Hard, outdoor 10 October	–	1R	Bye			
Shanghai Masters, Shanghai; China; Masters 1000; Hard, outdoor 10 October	895	2R	(United States) John Isner	20	Win	6–3, 6–4
Shanghai Masters, Shanghai; China; Masters 1000; Hard, outdoor 10 October	896	3R	(Italy) Andreas Seppi	58	Win	6–3, 6–4
Shanghai Masters, Shanghai; China; Masters 1000; Hard, outdoor 10 October	897	QF	(Sweden) Robin Söderling	5	Win	6–1, 6–1
Shanghai Masters, Shanghai; China; Masters 1000; Hard, outdoor 10 October	898	SF	(Serbia) Novak Djokovic	2	Win	7–5, 6–4
Shanghai Masters, Shanghai; China; Masters 1000; Hard, outdoor 10 October	899	F	(United Kingdom) Andy Murray	4	Loss (4)	3–6, 2–6
Stockholm Open, Stockholm; Sweden; 250; Hard, indoor 18 October	–	1R	Bye			
Stockholm Open, Stockholm; Sweden; 250; Hard, indoor 18 October	900	2R	(United States) Taylor Dent	101	Win	6–1, 6–2
Stockholm Open, Stockholm; Sweden; 250; Hard, indoor 18 October	901	QF	(Switzerland) Stanislas Wawrinka	21	Win	2–6, 6–3, 6–2
Stockholm Open, Stockholm; Sweden; 250; Hard, indoor 18 October	902	SF	(Croatia) Ivan Ljubičić	17	Win	7–6^{(7–5)}, 6–2
Stockholm Open, Stockholm; Sweden; 250; Hard, indoor 18 October	903	W	(Germany) Florian Mayer	47	Win (3)	6–4, 6–3
Swiss Indoors Basel, Basel; Switzerland; 500; Hard, indoor 1 November	904	1R	(Ukraine) Alexandr Dolgopolov	48	Win	6–4, 5–2 RET
Swiss Indoors Basel, Basel; Switzerland; 500; Hard, indoor 1 November	905	2R	(Serbia) Janko Tipsarević	46	Win	6–3, 6–4
Swiss Indoors Basel, Basel; Switzerland; 500; Hard, indoor 1 November	906	QF	(Czech Republic) Radek Štěpánek	38	Win	6–3, 6–2
Swiss Indoors Basel, Basel; Switzerland; 500; Hard, indoor 1 November	907	SF	(United States) Andy Roddick	9	Win	6–2, 6–4
Swiss Indoors Basel, Basel; Switzerland; 500; Hard, indoor 1 November	908	W	(Serbia) Novak Djokovic	3	Win (4)	6–4, 3–6, 6–1
Paris Masters, Paris; France; Masters 1000; Hard, indoor 7 November	–	1R	Bye			
Paris Masters, Paris; France; Masters 1000; Hard, indoor 7 November	909	2R	(France) Richard Gasquet	28	Win	6–4, 6–4
Paris Masters, Paris; France; Masters 1000; Hard, indoor 7 November	910	3R	(Czech Republic) Radek Štěpánek	41	Win	6–4, 6–3
Paris Masters, Paris; France; Masters 1000; Hard, indoor 7 November	911	QF	(Austria) Jürgen Melzer	12	Win	6–1, 7–6^{(7–4)}
Paris Masters, Paris; France; Masters 1000; Hard, indoor 7 November	912	SF	(France) Gaël Monfils	14	Loss	6–7^{(7–9)}, 7–6^{(7–1)}, 6–7^{(4–7)}
ATP World Tour Finals, London; England; YEC; Hard, indoor 21 November	913	RR	(Spain) David Ferrer	7	Win	6–1, 6–4
ATP World Tour Finals, London; England; YEC; Hard, indoor 21 November	914	RR	(United Kingdom) Andy Murray	5	Win	6–4, 6–2
ATP World Tour Finals, London; England; YEC; Hard, indoor 21 November	915	RR	(Sweden) Robin Söderling	4	Win	7–6^{(7–5)}, 6–3
ATP World Tour Finals, London; England; YEC; Hard, indoor 21 November	916	SF	(Serbia) Novak Djokovic	3	Win	6–1, 6–4
ATP World Tour Finals, London; England; YEC; Hard, indoor 21 November	917	W	(Spain) Rafael Nadal	1	Win (5)	6–3, 3–6, 6–1

==== Exhibition matches ====
Tournament	Round	Opponent(s)	Result	Score
Capitala World Tennis Championship; Abu Dhabi, United Arab Emirates; Exhibition tournament Hard, outdoor 31 December 2009 – 2 January 2010	QF	Bye		
Capitala World Tennis Championship; Abu Dhabi, United Arab Emirates; Exhibition tournament Hard, outdoor 31 December 2009 – 2 January 2010	SF	(Sweden) Robin Söderling	Loss	7–6^{(8–6)}, 6–7^{(1–7)}, 2–6
Capitala World Tennis Championship; Abu Dhabi, United Arab Emirates; Exhibition tournament Hard, outdoor 31 December 2009 – 2 January 2010	3rd	(Spain) David Ferrer	Win	6–1, 7–5
Hit for Haiti @ Australian Open; Melbourne, Australia; Charity event Hard, indoor 17 January 2010 Red Team / List of partners (Australia) Lleyton Hewitt (Australia) Samantha Stosur (United States) Serena Williams	W	Blue Team / List of opponents (Belgium) Kim Clijsters (Serbia) Novak Djokovic (Spain) Rafael Nadal (United States) Andy Roddick (Australia) Bernard Tomic (Alt)	Win	7–6^{(8–7)}
Hit for Haiti 2 @ BNP Paribas Open; Indian Wells, United States; Charity event Hard, outdoor 13 March 2010; Partner: Pete Sampras	W	(United States) Andre Agassi (Spain) Rafael Nadal	Win	8–6
Masters Guinot-Mary Cohr; Paris, France; Exhibition tournament Clay, outdoor 19 – 21 May 2010	F R3	(Germany) Rainer Schüttler	Win	4–6, 6–3, [10–5]
Match for Africa and Joining Forces for the Benefit of Children; Zürich (SUI) and Madrid (ESP); Charity event Hard, indoor 21 – 22 December 2010	Day 1	(Spain) Rafael Nadal	Win	4–6, 6–3, 6–3
Match for Africa and Joining Forces for the Benefit of Children; Zürich (SUI) and Madrid (ESP); Charity event Hard, indoor 21 – 22 December 2010	Day 2	(Spain) Rafael Nadal	Loss	6–7^{(3–7)}, 6–4, 1–6

==== Doubles ====
Tournament	Match	Round	Opponents (seed or key)	Ranks	Result	Score
Internazionali BNL d'Italia; Rome, Italy; ATP 1000; Clay, outdoor 26 April – 2 May 2010; Partner: (Switzerland) Yves Allegro
Internazionali BNL d'Italia; Rome, Italy; ATP 1000; Clay, outdoor 26 April – 2 May 2010; Partner: (Switzerland) Yves Allegro	1 / 186	1R	(Sweden) Johan Brunström / (Netherlands Antilles) Jean-Julien Rojer	#33 / #34	Win	6–4, 7–6^{(7–4)}
Internazionali BNL d'Italia; Rome, Italy; ATP 1000; Clay, outdoor 26 April – 2 May 2010; Partner: (Switzerland) Yves Allegro	2 / 187	2R	(Sweden) Simon Aspelin / (Australia) Paul Hanley (6)	#11 / #15	Win	4–6, 6–3, [10–8]
Internazionali BNL d'Italia; Rome, Italy; ATP 1000; Clay, outdoor 26 April – 2 May 2010; Partner: (Switzerland) Yves Allegro	3 / 188	QF	(United States) John Isner / (United States) Sam Querrey	#50 / #40	Loss	4–6, 4–6
Gerry Weber Open; Halle, Germany; ATP 250; Grass, outdoor 7 – 13 June 2010; Partner: (Switzerland) Yves Allegro
Gerry Weber Open; Halle, Germany; ATP 250; Grass, outdoor 7 – 13 June 2010; Partner: (Switzerland) Yves Allegro	4 / 189	1R	(Germany) Christopher Kas / (Germany) Philipp Kohlschreiber	#35 / #76	Loss	4–6, 6–7^{(6–8)}

Source (ATP)

== Yearly records ==
=== Finals ===
==== Singles: 9 (5–4) ====
Legend Grand Slam (1–0) ATP World Tour Finals (1–0) ATP World Tour Masters 1000 (1–3) ATP World Tour 500 Series (1–0) ATP World Tour 250 Series (1–1)	Titles by surface Hard (5–2) Clay (0–1) Grass (0–1)	Titles by surface Outdoors (2–4) Indoors (3–0)

Outcome	No.	Date	Tournament	Surface	Opponent	Score
Winner	62.	31 January 2010	Australian Open, Australia (4)	Hard	(United Kingdom) Andy Murray	6–3, 6–4, 7–6^{(13–11)}
Runner-up	25.	16 May 2010	Madrid Open, Spain (2)	Clay	(Spain) Rafael Nadal	4–6, 6–7^{(5–7)}
Runner-up	26.	13 June 2010	Halle Open, Germany	Grass	(Australia) Lleyton Hewitt	6–3, 6–7^{(4–7)}, 4–6
Runner-up	27.	15 August 2010	Canada Masters, Canada (2)	Hard	(United Kingdom) Andy Murray	5–7, 5–7
Winner	63.	23 August 2010	Cincinnati Masters, United States (4)	Hard	(United States) Mardy Fish	6–7^{(5–7)}, 7–6^{(7–1)}, 6–4
Runner-up	28.	17 October 2010	Shanghai Masters, China	Hard	(United Kingdom) Andy Murray	3–6, 2–6
Winner	64.	24 October 2010	Stockholm Open, Sweden	Hard (i)	(Germany) Florian Mayer	6–4, 6–3
Winner	65.	7 November 2010	Swiss Indoors, Switzerland (4)	Hard (i)	(Serbia) Novak Djokovic	6–4, 3–6, 6–1
Winner	66.	28 November 2010	Year-End Championships, London, UK (5)	Hard (i)	(Spain) Rafael Nadal	6–3, 3–6, 6–1

== See also ==
- Roger Federer career statistics
