= 2010 Gerry Weber Open =

- Date: 5–13 June
- Edition: 18th
- Category: ATP World Tour 250
- Prize money: €663,750
- Surface: Grass / outdoor
- Location: Halle, Germany
- Venue: Gerry Weber Stadion

Champions

Singles
- (Australia) Lleyton Hewitt

Doubles
- (Ukraine) Sergiy Stakhovsky / (Russia) Mikhail Youzhny
← 2009 ·	Gerry Weber Open	· 2011 →

The 2010 Gerry Weber Open was a men's tennis tournament played on outdoor grass courts. It was the 18th edition of the event known that year as the Gerry Weber Open and was part of the ATP World Tour 250 series of the 2010 ATP World Tour. It took place at the Gerry Weber Stadion in Halle, Germany, from 5 June through 13 June 2010. Eighth-seeded Lleyton Hewitt won the singles title. He snapped a 15 match losing streak against Federer and it was Federer's first loss at Halle since 2002.

== Finals ==
=== Singles ===
(Australia) Lleyton Hewitt defeated (Switzerland) Roger Federer, 3–6, 7–6^{(7–4)}, 6–4

- It was Hewitt's first title of the year and 28th of his career.

=== Doubles ===
(Ukraine) Sergiy Stakhovsky' / (Russia) Mikhail Youzhny defeated (Czech Republic) Martin Damm / (Slovakia) Filip Polášek 4–6, 7–5, [10–7]

== Entries ==
=== Seeds ===
Player	Nationality	Ranking*	Seeding
Roger Federer	Switzerland	2	1
Nikolay Davydenko	Russia	5	2
Mikhail Youzhny	Russia	14	3
Juan Carlos Ferrero	Spain	18	4
Radek Štěpánek	Czech Republic	20	5
Jürgen Melzer	Austria	27	6
Marcos Baghdatis	Cyprus	30	7
Lleyton Hewitt	Australia	33	8

- Seedings are based on the rankings of May 31, 2010.

=== Other entrants ===
The following players received wildcards into the singles main draw:

- (Germany) Andreas Beck
- (Germany) Nicolas Kiefer
- (Germany) Mischa Zverev

The following players received entry from the qualifying draw:

- (India) Rohan Bopanna
- (Russia) Alexander Kudryavtsev
- (Russia) Mikhail Ledovskikh
- (Israel) Noam Okun

The following players received a lucky loser spot:

- (Germany) Dominik Meffert
- (Belgium) Ruben Bemelmans
