= 2010 Sony Ericsson Open =

Coordinates: 25°42′29″N 80°09′32″W

- Date: March 22 – April 4
- Edition: 26th
- Category: Masters 1000 (ATP); Premier Mandatory (WTA)
- Surface: Hard / outdoor
- Location: Key Biscayne, Miami, United States
- Venue: Tennis Center at Crandon Park

Champions

Men's singles
- (United States) Andy Roddick

Women's singles
- (Belgium) Kim Clijsters

Men's doubles
- (Czech Republic) Lukáš Dlouhý / (India) Leander Paes

Women's doubles
- (Argentina) Gisela Dulko / (Italy) Flavia Pennetta
- Miami Open

The 2010 Sony Ericsson Open (also known as the 2010 Miami Masters), was a tennis tournament for men and women held from March 22 to April 4, 2010. It was the 26th edition of the Miami Masters event and is played on outdoor hard courts at the Tennis Center at Crandon Park in Key Biscayne, Florida, located near Miami. The tournament is a part of 2010 ATP World Tour and 2010 WTA Tour, classified as an ATP World Tour Masters 1000 and a WTA Premier Mandatory event respectively.

== Entrants ==
=== ATP World Tour ===
==== Seeds ====
Athlete	Nationality	Ranking*	Seeding
Roger Federer	Switzerland	1	1
Novak Djokovic	Serbia	2	2
Andy Murray	Great Britain	3	3
Rafael Nadal	Spain	4	4
Robin Söderling	Sweden	7	5
Andy Roddick	United States	8	6
Marin Čilić	Croatia	9	7
Jo-Wilfried Tsonga	France	10	8
Fernando González	Chile	11	9
Fernando Verdasco	Spain	12	10
Ivan Ljubičić	Croatia	13	11
Juan Carlos Ferrero	Spain	14	12
Mikhail Youzhny	Russia	15	13
~~Gaël Monfils~~	~~France~~	~~16~~	~~14~~
David Ferrer	Spain	17	15
Tomáš Berdych	Czech Republic	20	16
John Isner	United States	21	17
Tommy Robredo	Spain	22	18
Stanislas Wawrinka	Switzerland	23	19
Gilles Simon	France	24	20
Sam Querrey	United States	25	21
Juan Mónaco	Argentina	26	22
Jürgen Melzer	Austria	28	23
Ivo Karlović	Croatia	29	24
Marcos Baghdatis	Cyprus	30	25
Albert Montañés	Spain	31	26
Thomaz Bellucci	Brazil	32	27
Philipp Kohlschreiber	Germany	33	28
Feliciano López	Spain	34	29
Viktor Troicki	Serbia	35	30
Janko Tipsarević	Serbia	36	31
Julien Benneteau	France	37	32
Nicolás Almagro	Spain	38	33

- Rankings are as of March 22, 2010.

==== Other entrants ====
The following players received wildcards into the main draw:

- (Croatia) Mario Ančić
- (United States) Ryan Harrison
- (Serbia) Filip Krajinović
- (Spain) ~~Carlos Moyá~~
- (Argentina) David Nalbandian

The following players received entry via qualifying:

- (South Africa) Kevin Anderson
- (Brazil) Marcos Daniel (as a Lucky loser)
- (Colombia) Santiago Giraldo
- (Kazakhstan) Andrey Golubev
- (Turkey) Marsel İlhan
- (Uzbekistan) Denis Istomin
- (Ecuador) Nicolás Lapentti (as a Lucky loser)
- (Chinese Taipei) Lu Yen-hsun
- (Belgium) Xavier Malisse
- (Ukraine) Illya Marchenko
- (Chile) Nicolás Massú
- (Brazil) Ricardo Mello
- (Germany) Rainer Schüttler
- (United States) Ryan Sweeting

==== Withdrawals ====
The following notable players withdrew from the event:

- (Argentina) José Acasuso
- (Russia) Nikolay Davydenko (broken wrist)
- (Argentina) Juan Martín del Potro (right wrist)
- (Germany) Tommy Haas (hip injury)
- (Australia) Lleyton Hewitt (hip injury)
- (France) Gaël Monfils (left wrist)
- (Spain) Carlos Moyá (ankle)
- (Czech Republic) Radek Štěpánek

=== WTA Tour ===
==== Seeds ====
Athlete	Nationality	Ranking*	Seeding
Svetlana Kuznetsova	Russia	3	1
Caroline Wozniacki	Denmark	4	2
Venus Williams	United States	5	3
Victoria Azarenka	Belarus	6	4
Elena Dementieva	Russia	7	5
Agnieszka Radwańska	Poland	8	6
Jelena Janković	Serbia	9	7
Li Na	China	10	8
Samantha Stosur	Australia	11	9
Flavia Pennetta	Italy	12	10
Vera Zvonareva	Russia	14	11
Yanina Wickmayer	Belgium	15	12
Marion Bartoli	France	16	13
Kim Clijsters	Belgium	17	14
Francesca Schiavone	Italy	18	15
Nadia Petrova	Russia	19	16
Shahar Pe'er	Israel	20	17
Aravane Rezaï	France	21	18
Daniela Hantuchová	Slovakia	22	19
Zheng Jie	China	23	20
Alona Bondarenko	Ukraine	24	21
Anastasia Pavlyuchenkova	Russia	25	22
Sabine Lisicki	Germany	26	23
Alisa Kleybanova	Russia	27	24
Ana Ivanovic	Serbia	28	25
Dominika Cibulková	Slovakia	29	26
Ágnes Szávay	Hungary	30	27
Elena Vesnina	Russia	31	28
María José Martínez Sánchez	Spain	33	29
Anabel Medina Garrigues	Spain	34	30
Aleksandra Wozniak	Canada	35	31
Maria Kirilenko	Russia	36	32

- Rankings are as of March 9, 2010.

==== Other entrants ====
The following players received wildcards into the main draw:

- (Belgium) Justine Henin
- (Portugal) Michelle Larcher de Brito
- (Croatia) Petra Martić
- (Australia) Alicia Molik
- (Russia) Anastasia Pivovarova
- (Netherlands) Arantxa Rus
- (Croatia) Ajla Tomljanović
- (United Kingdom) Heather Watson

The following players received entry via qualifying:

- (Sweden) Sofia Arvidsson
- (United Kingdom) Elena Baltacha
- (Australia) Casey Dellacqua
- (Ukraine) Mariya Koryttseva
- (Netherlands) Michaëlla Krajicek
- (Russia) Regina Kulikova
- (United States) Varvara Lepchenko
- (United States) Bethanie Mattek-Sands
- (Japan) Ayumi Morita
- (France) Pauline Parmentier
- (Bulgaria) Tsvetana Pironkova
- (Australia) Anastasia Rodionova

==== Withdrawals ====
The following notable players withdrew from the event:

- (Ukraine) Kateryna Bondarenko (knee injury)
- (Germany) Anna-Lena Grönefeld
- (India) Sania Mirza
- (Poland) Urszula Radwańska
- (Russia) Dinara Safina (back injury)
- (Russia) Maria Sharapova (right elbow)
- (United States) Serena Williams (left knee)

== Prize money ==
Th total commitment prize money for this year's event is $4,500,000 each (WTA Tour and ATP World Tour).

	Men's singles	Women's singles	Men's doubles	Women's doubles
Winner	$605,500	$700,000	$198,400	$237,000
Finalist	$295,500	$350,000	$96,820	$118,500
Semifinalist	$148,100	$150,000	$48,530	$51,000
Quarterfinalist	$75,500	$64,700	$24,730	$22,000
Round of 16	$39,800	$32,000	$13,040	$11,500
Round of 32	$21,300	$18,740	$6,980	$4,000
Round of 64	$11,500	$11,500	-	-
Round of 96	$7,050	$7,050	-	-
Fees, Bonus, Pool	$989,800			

== Events ==
=== Men's singles ===
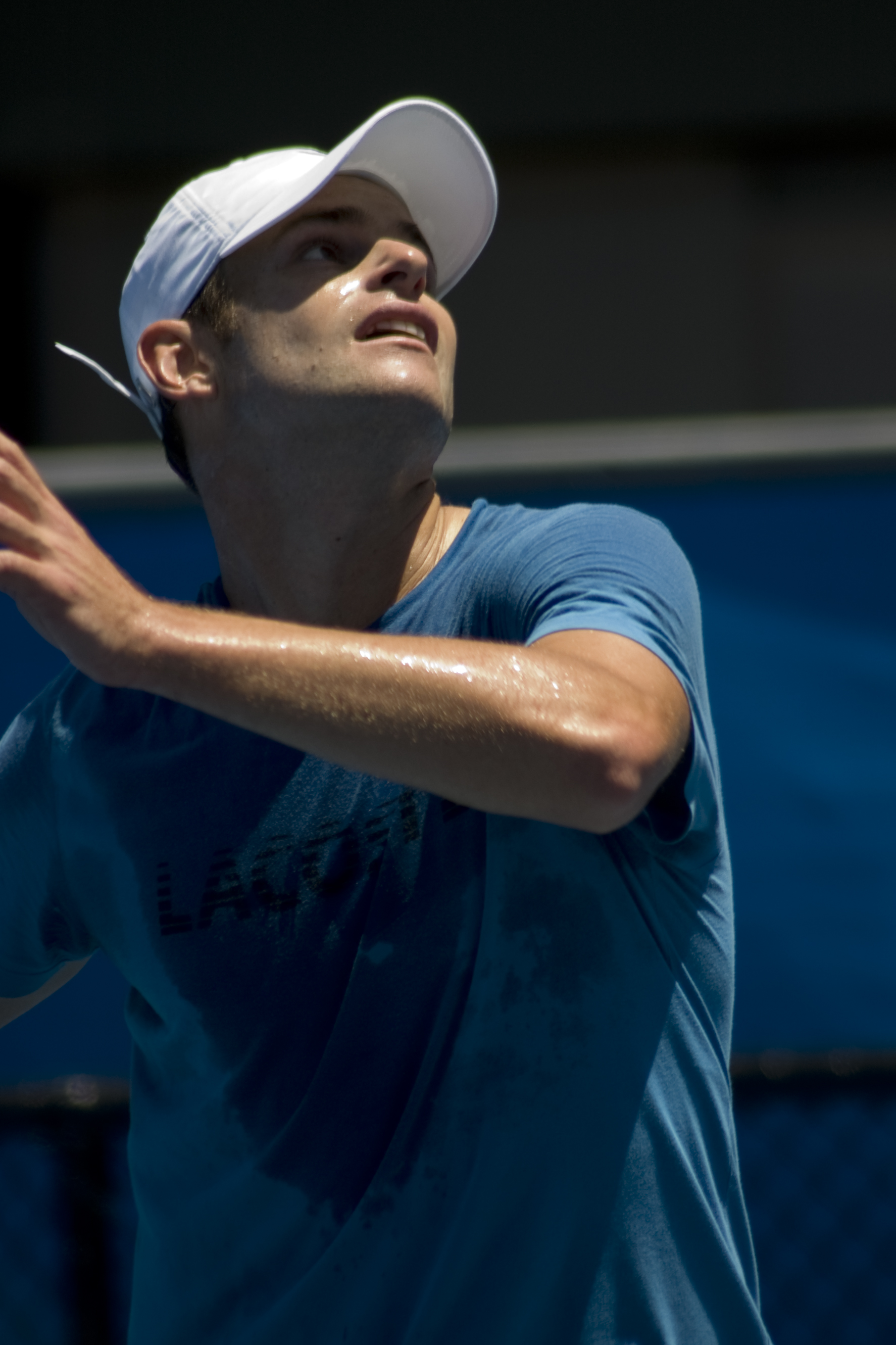
Andy Roddick the Men's singles champion of the 2010 Sony Ericsson Open

All seeds receive a bye into the second round. 14th seed Gaël Monfils withdrew before the start of the tournament and was replaced by Nicolás Almagro as the 33rd seed. Mardy Fish, David Nalbandian and Taylor Dent all progress to the second round in straight sets as James Blake grinded in three sets to advance, while Richard Gasquet was the upset of the round. The second round recorded major upsets as 2nd seed and 2009 finalist Novak Djokovic fell to Olivier Rochus 6−2, 6−7(6), 6−4 and 3rd seed and defending champion Andy Murray fell to Mardy Fish 6−4, 6−4. Other seeds that fell were Albert Montañés, Janko Tipsarević, Sam Querrey and Viktor Troicki who lost to David Nalbandian. The 2010 BNP Paribas Open Ivan Ljubičić retired due to back injury leading 6−4, 1−0. In the Third Round the top seeds Roger Federer struggled against Florent Serra in closing out each set but eventually won 7−6(2), 7−6(3) and 4th seed Rafael Nadal survived against David Nalbandian 6−7(8), 6−2, 6−2. The other seeds went through a rough patch as they needed to overcome a 1st set loss but eventually advance namely Mikhail Youzhny, Fernando González and Fernando Verdasco. Juan Carlos Ferrero overcame a second lapse against John Isner winning 6−2, 3−6, 6−3, while compatriots Tommy Robredo and Feliciano López fell. Top ten players Andy Roddick, Robin Söderling and Marin Čilić cruised through.

In the fourth round action Jo Wilfried Tsonga cruised over Juan Carlos Ferrero 6−2, 6−2 to set up a clash against Rafael Nadal who downed compatriot David Ferrer 7–6(5), 6–4. Andy Roddick also made through the quarterfinals recovering from a 1−4 (0−40) scoreline in the first set to defeat Benjamin Becker 7−6(4), 6−3 and is scheduled to face Nicolás Almagro who grinded out a 3 set win over Thomaz Bellucci. The other Quarterfinal showdown is between Mikhail Youzhny who defeated Mardy Fish taking on Robin Söderling who won over Fernando González. Fernando Verdasco also made through with a 6-4 7–6(3) coming back from a break down in the second set over Marin Čilić. He is now scheduled to face Tomáš Berdych who upset Roger Federer 6–4, 6-7(3), 7-6(6) saving a match point en route to the victory. In the first of the battle for the semi-finals Andy Roddick made quick work of Nicolás Almagro with a 6−3, 6−3 in just 80 minutes breaking the Spaniards serve 3 times and saving the only two break points he faced in the second round. The American defeated 4−6, 6−3, 6−3 Rafael Nadal who also had had an easy victory over Frenchman Jo-Wilfried Tsonga breaking the Tsonga serve 4 times and saving all 8 break points he faced to earn a 6−3, 6−2 victory. Following Nadal and Roddick in the semifinals was Tomáš Berdych who survived against Fernando Verdasco two days after defeating Roger Federer 4−6, 7−6(5), 6−4 with both players saving 7 of 9 break points. Berdych defeated Swede Robin Söderling who had cruised over Mikhail Youzhny with a 6−1, 6−4. In the first semifinal saw Andy Roddick taking on Rafael Nadal with leading the head-to-head 5−2 with a 3 match winning streak and 7 straight sets. However the American was able to upset Spaniard 4−6, 6−3, 6−3 with Roddick changing strategies in the middle of the second set and being more agrresive and breaking the Spaniard 3 times with himself getting broken once. Nadal reacted on Roddick' change of tactics he said "I started the match playing pretty well in the beginning. Later in the second set Andy was serving well; I didn't have a lot of chances on the return. He started to play more aggressive in the game where he broke me. It was a change, and it was surprise for me.". In the second semifinal saw Tomáš Berdych continue his marvelous run and upsetting Robin Söderling with a 6−2, 6−2 crushing victory over the Swede breaking the Swede 4 times and saving the only break point he faced.

In the finals it was Roddick's 10th Masters final and the 2nd for Berdych. In their head-to-head Roddick is above Berdych 5−2, and Roddick has won their 3 previous encounters including 2 this year. In the match, it was completely even as both players did not face a single break point up until 5-5, where Berdych save a break point but double faulted and went long to give Roddick the break, and serve out the first set at love. In the second set Roddick got to an early start as he broke for a 2−0 lead and even had match points at 5−3 but BErdych fend it off, but Roddick serve it out to win the set 6−4 and the match. Asked what most pleased him about the title run, Roddick said: "I won in different ways. I changed it up against Rafa and today I was smart with chipping and mixing paces, which kept him guessing. I held onto my serve well throughout and played a pretty smart tournament.". "He was just too strong today", Berdych said. "He's not just serving the big bombs. His variations of the serve are a really big improvement. ... I was really looking for maybe to get one chance, but he held pretty well. I didn’t get any chance during whole match.".

Championship Match

(United States) Andy Roddick defeated (Czech Republic) Tomáš Berdych 7−5, 6−4

- It was Roddick's second title of the year and 29th of his career. It was his 5th Masters 1000 title. It was his 2nd win at Miami, also winning in 2004.

=== Women's singles ===
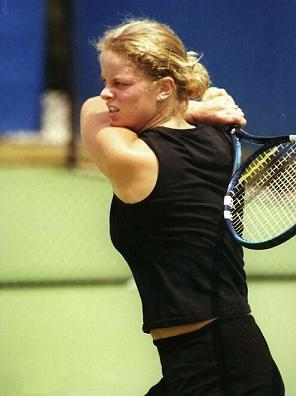
Kim Clijsters the Women's singles champion of the 2010 Sony Ericsson Open

All seeds receive a bye into the second round. With Serena Williams withdrawal sister Venus Williams replaced her to open up the 2nd round. In the second round several seeds fell with Alona Bondarenko, Sabine Lisicki, Alisa Kleybanova, María José Martínez Sánchez, Anabel Medina Garrigues, Aleksandra Wozniak and Aravane Rezaï. 2010 Australian Open Chinese semifinalists Li Na, Zheng Jie and Elena Dementieva were also ousted. In the third round most of the higher seeds progress with the exceptions of Francesca Schiavone who fell to Anastasia Pavlyuchenkova, Nadia Petrova falling to Daniela Hantuchová and Justine Henin progress over Dominika Cibulková. The fourth round began with a major upset as Marion Bartoli won convincingly over top seed Svetlana Kuznetsova 6–3, 6–0 as the Russian struggled with a shoulder injury. Third seed Venus Williams also struggled as she rallied to defeat Daniela Hantuchová 1−6, 7−5, 6−4 in the only three set affair in the fourth round and overcoming a 2−0 deficit in the second set. Three Belgians advance to the Quarterfinals with relative ease Yanina Wickmayer defeated Timea Bacsinszky 6−0, 6−1, Justine Henin dominated Vera Zvonareva with a 6–4, 6–0 victory and Kim Clijsters prevailed over defending champion Victoria Azarenka 6−4, 6−0. world no. 2 Caroline Wozniacki, Agnieszka Radwańska and Samantha Stosur also won in straight sets.

In the first day of the Quarterfinals Venus Williams recorded her 5th straight victory over Agnieszka Radwańska convincingly 6−3, 6−1 breaking the Radwańska serve five times, with her serve getting broken once. Venus was followed by Marion Bartoli who edged out one of three Belgians in the quarterfinals Yanina Wickmayer 6−4, 7−5 the match featured 12 breaks of serve 7−5 to Bartoli as both players struggled on serve. The meeting between Bartoli and Venus is their first match that is not a final. Bartoli and Venus was joined in by the Belgians Kim Clijsters and Justine Henin in the Semifinals. Kim Clijsters had an easier victory as she dispatched Australian Samantha Stosur 6–3, 7–5 in just over 70 minutes, while Justine Henin needed twice as more time to grind over world no. 2 Caroline Wozniacki with a 6–7(5), 6–3, 6–4 victory. In the Semifinals Venus Williams made a quick work of Marion Bartoli winning 6−4, 6−3. Bartoli made four double faults in the sixth and stated that "It was all terrible. The more I was thinking, okay, just put your first serve in, the worse it was getting. I think it's also the part that she's so inside the baseline. I would just put the first serve in, and she would just get over it and kill me on the return of serve. That really put a lot of pressure on [me]." she then added "I think that's also what sets her apart from the other players. Like Serena, when you get her in front of you, it's not like an average player returning your serve. If you're not serving perfectly, she gonna hit a great return and [you will] be on defense." This is Venus' 15th straight win. In the 2nd semifinals in a Belgian encounter saw Kim Clijsters outlasted compatriot Justine Henin 6−2, 6−7(3), 7−6(6) to even their head-to-head 12−12.

In the finals the head-to-head was 6−5 in favor of the American. However it was the Belgian Kim Clijsters who dominated her most fancied opponent American Venus Williams 6−2, 6−1, thus breaking the Americans 15 match winning streak and the Belgian returning to the top 10. "It took a lot of hard work to get back into shape and I have a few people to thank, including my fitness coach and husband", Clijsters said during the on-court ceremony. "It feels really good to be back here, having won the title in 2005. It's always nice to come back to a place you have done well before, and to such a beautiful stadium." The Belgian added. The older Williams stated that "Sometimes when you hit a few bad shots it's not as easy to reel it in, and things start to go a little bit quicker. Every now and then it happens to the best of us. I think this happened to Kim in Australia, so I think she knows what it's like. Wasn't the best day, but that's, I guess, sport sometimes." and added "Obviously against a player like Kim, if you make too many errors, the match can go quickly. I mean, I think she hit eight winners, so it wasn't she played extremely solid; it's not like I was blown off the court. Unfortunately I was my own worst enemy today.". Clijsters then said "What has changed for me now is whatever I do at the courts, it's almost like my time off", Clijsters said. "I get to come here, work out and play my matches. It's like Mommy time. When I’m done, I’m really focused on my family life, and I like the balance.".

Championship Match

(Belgium) Kim Clijsters defeated (United States) Venus Williams, 6−2, 6−1.

- It was Clijsters' second title of the year and 37th of her career. It was her second title of this event, also winning in 2005.

=== Men's doubles ===
In the first round all seeded players progress with the exception of 5th seed Łukasz Kubot and Oliver Marach fell to the German team of Benjamin Becker and Michael Kohlmann. They were joined by half of the defending champion Andy Ram who partnered Michaël Llodra who fell to Feliciano López and Fernando Verdasco. The second round action saw top seeds Daniel Nestor – Nenad Zimonjić and 6th seeds Simon Aspelin – Paul Hanley falling to the Spanish teams of Nicolás Almagro – Tommy Robredo and Feliciano López – Fernando Verdasco respectively. 7th seeds František Čermák and Michal Mertiňák also fell to Arnaud Clément and Jo-Wilfried Tsonga, while 4 seeds also advance to the Quarterfinals. In the Quarterfinals Spanish team of Nicolás Almagro and Tommy Robredo won over compatriots Feliciano López and Fernando Verdasco, while 3rd seed Lukáš Dlouhý and Leander Paes, and 4th seed Mahesh Bhupathi and Max Mirnyi occupied their rightful semifinal slots. For the final slot were Polish team of Mariusz Fyrstenberg and Marcin Matkowski who upset 2nd seeded Americans Bob Bryan and Mike Bryan. In the semifinals the two higher seeds remaining both won their matches comfortably with 3rd seeds Lukáš Dlouhý and Leander Paes winning 6–3, 6–0 over unseeded Spaniards Nicolás Almagro and Tommy Robredo, while 4th seeds Mahesh Bhupathi and Max Mirnyi also won in straight sets over 8th-seeded Poles Mariusz Fyrstenberg and Marcin Matkowski 7–6(4), 6–4. In the final it was the pair of Lukáš Dlouhý and Leander Paes who came through and thus winning their first Miami title as a team and as individuals with a 6–2, 7–5 victory over Mahesh Bhupathi and Max Mirnyi in the process halting Mirnyi's quest for a record 5th doubles title.

Championship Match

(Czech Republic) Lukáš Dlouhý / (India) Leander Paes defeated (India) Mahesh Bhupathi / (Belarus) Max Mirnyi, 6–2, 7–5.

=== Women's doubles ===
In the first round three seeded teams fell with Bethanie Mattek-Sands and Yan Zi who fell to Maria Kirilenko and Agnieszka Radwańska, Chuang Chia-jung and Hsieh Su-wei falling to Klaudia Jans and Vladimíra Uhlířová, and the biggest upset as top seeds Cara Black and Liezel Huber was upset by Natalie Grandin and Abigail Spears. Defending champion Svetlana Kuznetsova partnered with Alicia Molik losing to Gisela Dulko and Flavia Pennetta. In the second round remaining seeded teams all made it through with the exception of the no. 2 seeds Nuria Llagostera Vives and María José Martínez Sánchez who fell to Gisela Dulko and Flavia Pennetta.

In the quarterfinals 4th seeds Rennae Stubbs and Lisa Raymond advance with a comfortable win over Alisa Kleybanova and Francesca Schiavone, while Stubbs former partner Samantha Stosur also advance with Nadia Petrova with a win over Julie Coin and Vania King. In the semifinals Nadia Petrova and Samantha Stosur defeated the team of Chan Yung-jan and Zheng Jie in a 6–1, 7–5 final score, and the team of Gisela Dulko and Flavia Pennetta also advanced to the final defeating Lisa Raymond and Rennae Stubbs double 6–4. In the semifinals saw Nadia Petrova and Samantha Stosur advancing to the finals in a convincing fashion with a 6–1, 7–5 victory over Chan Yung-jan and Zheng Jie. In the second semifinals saw Gisela Dulko and Flavia Pennetta upsetting 4th seeds Lisa Raymond and Rennae Stubbs in a straight set 6–4, 6–4 victory. In the final it was the pair Gisela Dulko and Flavia Pennetta who produce another upset as they defeated 3rd seeds Nadia Petrova and Samantha Stosur, thus defeating 3 of the top 4 seeds after upsetting 2nd seeds Nuria Llagostera Vives and María José Martínez Sánchez in the second round and 3rd seeds Lisa Raymond and Rennae Stubbs in the semifinals. This is Dulko and Pennetta's first Mandatory level doubles title as a team and as individuals.

Championship Match

(Argentina) Gisela Dulko / (Italy) Flavia Pennetta defeated (Russia) Nadia Petrova / (Australia) Samantha Stosur, 6–3, 4–6, [10–7].

== Attendance ==
A record total of 312,386 visited the Crandon Park Tennis Center including a sellout crowd of 14,119 for the men's final on Sunday, April 4. The men's final sold out on March 8, marking the quickest sellout for a men's final in tournament history.
