= 2010 BNP Paribas Open =

- Date: March 8–21
- Edition: 37th (ATP) / 22nd (WTA)
- Category: World Tour Masters 1000 (ATP); Premier Mandatory (WTA)
- Prize money: $3,645,000
- Surface: Hard / outdoor
- Location: Indian Wells, California, US
- Venue: Indian Wells Tennis Garden

Champions

Men's singles
- (Croatia) Ivan Ljubičić

Women's singles
- (Serbia) Jelena Janković

Men's doubles
- (Spain) Rafael Nadal / (Spain) Marc López

Women's doubles
- (Czech Republic) Květa Peschke / (Slovenia) Katarina Srebotnik
← 2009 ·	Indian Wells Open	· 2011 →

The 2010 BNP Paribas Open was a tennis tournament played at Indian Wells, California in March 2010. It was the 37th edition of the men's event (22nd for the women), also known as the Indian Wells Open, and is classified as an ATP World Tour Masters 1000 event on the 2010 ATP World Tour and a Premier Mandatory event on the 2010 WTA Tour. Both the men's and the women's events took place at the Indian Wells Tennis Garden in Indian Wells, California, United States from March 8 through March 21, 2010.

The year's tournament saw a couple of withdrawals; The women's side saw the draw without the top two rank players with World no. 2 Dinara Safina withdrawing with a recurring back problem and world no. 1 Serena Williams with sister Venus Williams continue their boycott from the tournament since Serena won the event in 2001. The men's side saw the withdrawals of Tommy Haas and Lleyton Hewitt due to hip surgeries. Juan Martín del Potro also withdrew due to a right wrist injury and Fernando González withdrew to aid his country Chile after an earthquake. Stanislas Wawrinka also withdrew due to the birth of his child. Mikhail Youzhny also withdrew.

== Finals ==
=== Men's singles ===
(Croatia) Ivan Ljubičić defeated (United States) Andy Roddick, 7–6^{(7–3)}, 7–6^{(7–5)}

- It was Ljubicic's first title of the year and 10th of his career. It was his first Masters 1000 title in four finals. He became the first Croatian to win the title.

=== Women's singles ===
(Serbia) Jelena Janković defeated (Denmark) Caroline Wozniacki, 6–2, 6–4

- It was Janković's first title of the year and 12th of her career.

=== Men's doubles ===
(Spain) Marc López / (Spain) Rafael Nadal defeated (Canada) Daniel Nestor / (Serbia) Nenad Zimonjić, 7–6^{(10–8)}, 6–3

=== Women's doubles ===
(Czech Republic) Květa Peschke / (Slovenia) Katarina Srebotnik defeated (Russia) Nadia Petrova / (Australia) Samantha Stosur, 6–4, 2–6, [10–5]

== ATP entrants ==
=== Seeds ===
Athlete	Nationality	Ranking*	Seeding
Roger Federer	Switzerland	1	1
Novak Djokovic	Serbia	2	2
Rafael Nadal	Spain	3	3
Andy Murray	Great Britain	4	4
Nikolay Davydenko	Russia	6	5
Robin Söderling	Sweden	7	6
Andy Roddick	United States	8	7
Marin Čilić	Croatia	9	8
Jo-Wilfried Tsonga	France	11	9
Fernando Verdasco	Spain	12	10
Juan Carlos Ferrero	Spain	14	11
Gaël Monfils	France	15	12
David Ferrer	Spain	16	13
Radek Štěpánek	Czech Republic	17	14
John Isner	United States	20	15
Gilles Simon	France	21	16
Sam Querrey	United States	22	17
Tommy Robredo	Spain	23	18
Tomáš Berdych	Czech Republic	25	19
Ivan Ljubičić	Croatia	26	20
Juan Mónaco	Argentina	27	21
Jürgen Melzer	Austria	28	22
Ivo Karlović	Croatia	29	23
Philipp Kohlschreiber	Germany	30	24
Albert Montañés	Spain	31	25
Thomaz Bellucci	Brazil	32	26
Marcos Baghdatis	Cyprus	33	27
Feliciano López	Spain	34	28
Viktor Troicki	Serbia	35	29
Janko Tipsarević	Serbia	36	30
Igor Andreev	Russia	37	31
Julien Benneteau	France	38	32

- Rankings are as of March 1, 2010.

=== Other entrants ===
The following players received wildcards into the main draw:

- (United States) Robby Ginepri
- (United States) Ryan Harrison
- (United States) Jesse Levine
- (Spain) Carlos Moyá
- (Argentina) David Nalbandian

The following player received entry using a protected ranking:

- (Croatia) Mario Ančić

The following players received entry via qualifying:

- (Brazil) Thiago Alves
- (South Africa) Kevin Anderson
- (Argentina) Brian Dabul
- (Paraguay) Ramón Delgado
- (Austria) Stefan Koubek
- (Chinese Taipei) Lu Yen-hsun
- (Australia) Marinko Matosevic
- (Brazil) Ricardo Mello
- (Germany) Björn Phau
- (United States) Bobby Reynolds
- (United States) Tim Smyczek
- (Germany) Rainer Schüttler

=== Withdrawals ===
The following notable players withdrew from the tournament:

- (Argentina) José Acasuso
- (Argentina) Juan Martín del Potro (wrist injury)
- (France) Marc Gicquel
- Fernando González (helping with aid in Chile)
- (Argentina) Máximo González
- (Germany) Tommy Haas (hip surgery)
- (Australia) Lleyton Hewitt (hip surgery)
- (France) Fabrice Santoro
- (Switzerland) Stanislas Wawrinka
- (Russia) Mikhail Youzhny

== WTA entrants ==
=== Seeds ===
Athlete	Nationality	Ranking*	Seeding
Svetlana Kuznetsova	Russia	3	1
Caroline Wozniacki	Denmark	4	2
Victoria Azarenka	Belarus	6	3
Elena Dementieva	Russia	7	4
Agnieszka Radwańska	Poland	8	5
Jelena Janković	Serbia	9	6
Li Na	China	10	7
Samantha Stosur	Australia	11	8
Flavia Pennetta	Italy	12	9
Maria Sharapova	Russia	13	10
Marion Bartoli	France	14	11
Vera Zvonareva	Russia	15	12
Yanina Wickmayer	Belgium	16	13
Kim Clijsters	Belgium	17	14
Francesca Schiavone	Italy	18	15
Nadia Petrova	Russia	19	16
Shahar Pe'er	Israel	20	17
Zheng Jie	China	21	18
Aravane Rezaï	France	22	19
Alyona Bondarenko	Ukraine	23	20
Daniela Hantuchová	Slovakia	24	21
Sabine Lisicki	Germany	25	22
Alisa Kleybanova	Russia	26	23
Ana Ivanovic	Serbia	27	24
Anastasia Pavlyuchenkova	Russia	28	25
Dominika Cibulková	Slovakia	29	26
Ágnes Szávay	Hungary	31	27
María José Martínez Sánchez	Spain	33	28
Anabel Medina Garrigues	Spain	34	29
Aleksandra Wozniak	Canada	35	30
Gisela Dulko	Argentina	36	31
Maria Kirilenko	Russia	37	32

- Rankings are as of March 1, 2010.

=== Other entrants ===
The following players received wildcards into the main draw:

- (Greece) Eleni Daniilidou
- (United States) Alexa Glatch
- (Belgium) Justine Henin
- (United States) Bethanie Mattek-Sands
- (United States) Christina McHale
- (Australia) Alicia Molik
- (Austria) Tamira Paszek
- (Croatia) Ajla Tomljanović

The following players received entry via qualifying:

- (Uzbekistan) Akgul Amanmuradova
- (United Kingdom) Elena Baltacha
- (Chinese Taipei) Chan Yung-jan
- (Romania) Edina Gallovits
- (Ukraine) Viktoriya Kutuzova
- (Portugal) Michelle Larcher de Brito
- (Spain) Nuria Llagostera Vives
- (Croatia) Petra Martić
- (United States) Shenay Perry
- (Bulgaria) Tsvetana Pironkova
- (United States) Sloane Stephens
- (Croatia) Karolina Šprem

The following player received the lucky loser spot:

- (Thailand) Tamarine Tanasugarn

=== Withdrawals ===
The following notable players withdrew from the event:

- (Ukraine) Kateryna Bondarenko
- (Germany) Anna-Lena Grönefeld
- (India) Sania Mirza
- (Russia) Dinara Safina (back injury)
- (Russia) Elena Vesnina
- (United States) Serena Williams (continue to boycott event since 2001)
- (United States) Venus Williams (continue to boycott event since 2001)
