= 2000 Open 13 – Doubles =

Doubles
- 2000 Open 13

Final
- Champions: (Sweden) Simon Aspelin (Sweden) Johan Landsberg
- Runners-up: (Spain) Juan Ignacio Carrasco (Spain) Jairo Velasco Jr.
- Score: 7–6^{(7–2)}, 6–4

Details
- Draw: 16 (3WC)/1Q)
- Seeds: 4

Events
Singles	Doubles
← 1999 ·	Open 13	· 2001 →

Max Mirnyi and Andrei Olhovskiy were the defending champions, but did not participate this year.

Simon Aspelin and Johan Landsberg won the title, defeating Juan Ignacio Carrasco and Jairo Velasco Jr. 7–6^{(7–2)}, 6–4 in the final.

== Seeds ==
1. (Australia) David Macpherson / (Sweden) Peter Nyborg (first round)
2. (South Africa) Marius Barnard / (South Africa) Chris Haggard (quarterfinals)
3. (Spain) Tomás Carbonell / (Spain) Javier Sánchez (first round)
4. (South Africa) Neville Godwin / (Sweden) Nicklas Kulti (first round)

== Draw ==
=== Key ===
- Q = Qualifier
- WC = Wild card
- LL = Lucky loser
- Alt = Alternate
- ITF = ITF entry
- PR = Protected ranking
- SR = Special ranking
- SE = Special exempt
- JE = Junior exempt
- JR = Junior Accelerator Programme entrant
- CO = College Accelerator Programme entrant
- NG = Next Gen Accelerator Program entrant
- w/o = Walkover
- r = Retired
- d = Defaulted

=== Draw ===
First round
1	(Australia) D Macpherson (Sweden) P Nyborg	6	6^{4}	4
WC	(France) J Benneteau (France) N Mahut	4	7^{7}	6
(Japan) T Shimada (South Africa) M Wakefield	6	3	6^{5}
WC	(France) A Clément (France) G Raoux	4	6	7^{7}
4	(South Africa) N Godwin (Sweden) N Kulti	3	2
(Sweden) S Aspelin (Sweden) J Landsberg	6	6
(Switzerland) M Rosset (France) F Santoro	6^{5}	1
(Spain) Á López Morón (Spain) A Portas	7^{7}	6
(Spain) JI Carrasco (Spain) J Velasco Jr.	6	0	6
WC	(France) S Grosjean (France) C Saulnier	4	6	4
Q	(France) J Boutter (France) L Roux	6	6
3	(Spain) T Carbonell (Spain) J Sánchez	4	2
(United Kingdom) N Broad (Germany) M-K Goellner	3	7^{7}	2
(Italy) C Brandi (Italy) M Bertolini	6	6^{5}	6
(United States) D Bowen (Israel) E Ran	2	2
2	(South Africa) M Barnard (South Africa) C Haggard	6	6

Quarterfinals
WC	(France) J Benneteau (France) N Mahut	3	3
WC	(France) A Clément (France) G Raoux	6	6
(Sweden) S Aspelin (Sweden) J Landsberg	6	6
(Spain) Á López Morón (Spain) A Portas	3	4
(Spain) JI Carrasco (Spain) J Velasco Jr.	6	6
Q	(France) J Boutter (France) L Roux	3	4
(Italy) C Brandi (Italy) M Bertolini	7^{7}	7^{7}
2	(South Africa) M Barnard (South Africa) C Haggard	6^{5}	6^{5}

Semifinals
WC	(France) A Clément (France) G Raoux	4	4
(Sweden) S Aspelin (Sweden) J Landsberg	6	6
(Spain) JI Carrasco (Spain) J Velasco Jr.	6	6
(Italy) C Brandi (Italy) M Bertolini	4	3

Final
(Sweden) S Aspelin (Sweden) J Landsberg	7^{7}	6
(Spain) JI Carrasco (Spain) J Velasco Jr.	6^{2}	4

== Qualifying ==
=== Qualifying seeds ===
1. (Croatia) Goran Ivanišević / (Croatia) Ivan Ljubičić (first round)
2. (France) Julien Boutter / (France) Lionel Roux (qualified)

=== Qualifiers ===
1. (France) Julien Boutter / (France) Lionel Roux

=== Qualifying draw ===
First round
1	(Croatia) Goran Ivanišević (Croatia) Ivan Ljubičić	4	4
(France) Nicolas Coutelot (Netherlands) Rogier Wassen	6	6
WC	(Sweden) Thomas Johansson (Sweden) Andreas Vinciguerra	2	4
2	(France) Julien Boutter (France) Lionel Roux	6	6

Qualifying competition
(France) Nicolas Coutelot (Netherlands) Rogier Wassen	6	3	4
2	(France) Julien Boutter (France) Lionel Roux	3	6	6
