= 2001 ATP Challenger Series =

Tennis tour

Details
- Duration: 1 January 2001 – 9 December 2001
- Edition: 24th
- Tournaments: 137

Achievements (singles)

The ATP Challenger Series is the second tier tour for professional tennis organised by the Association of Tennis Professionals (ATP). The 2001 ATP Challenger Series calendar comprised 135 tournaments, with prize money ranging from $25,000 up to $125,000.

== Schedule ==
=== January ===
Date	Country	Tournament	Prizemoney	Surface	Singles champion	Doubles champions
01.01.	Brazil	Aberto de São Paulo	$ 25,000	Hard	(Brazil) Flávio Saretta	(Israel) Noam Okun (Brazil) André Sá
22.01.	Germany	Heilbronn Open	$ 100,000	Carpet (i)	(France) Michaël Llodra	(Netherlands) Sander Groen (United States) Jack Waite
22.01.	United States	Hilton Waikoloa Village USTA Challenger	$ 50,000	Hard	(United States) Andy Roddick	(United States) Paul Goldstein (United States) Jim Thomas
29.01.	Germany	Warsteiner Challenger	$ 25,000	Carpet (i)	(France) Michaël Llodra	(Austria) Julian Knowle (Switzerland) Lorenzo Manta

=== February ===
Date	Country	Tournament	Prizemoney	Surface	Singles champion	Doubles champions
05.02.	Poland	KGHM Polish Indoors	$ 125,000	Hard (i)	(Germany) Axel Pretzsch	(Zimbabwe) Wayne Black (South Africa) Jason Weir-Smith
05.02.	United States	Challenger of Dallas	$ 50,000	Hard	(Russia) Dmitry Tursunov	(United States) Gavin Sontag (Canada) Jerry Turek
12.02.	Germany	Warsteiner Challenger Lübeck	$ 25,000	Carpet (i)	(Austria) Zbynek Mlynarik	(Austria) Julian Knowle (Switzerland) Lorenzo Manta
12.02.	India	Mumbai Challenger	$ 25,000	Hard	(Italy) Federico Luzzi	(Czech Republic) František Čermák (Czech Republic) Ota Fukárek
19.02.	France	Challenger 42	$ 50,000	Hard (i)	(Serbia) Nenad Zimonjić	(France) Julien Benneteau (France) Nicolas Mahut
19.02.	Vietnam	Heineken Challenger	$ 50,000	Hard	(Czech Republic) Petr Kralert	(Japan) Takao Suzuki (United States) Eric Taino
19.02.	India	The IndianOil Servo ATP Challenger	$ 25,000	Hard	(Netherlands) Dennis van Scheppingen	(Czech Republic) František Čermák (Czech Republic) Radek Štěpánek
19.02.	Great Britain	Hull Challenger	$ 25,000	Carpet (i)	(Germany) Michael Kohlmann	(Germany) Michael Kohlmann (France) Michaël Llodra
19.02.	Germany	Volkswagen Challenger	$ 25,000	Carpet (i)	(Finland) Jarkko Nieminen	(Sweden) Robert Lindstedt (Sweden) Fredrik Lovén
26.02.	Singapore	Singapore Challenger	$ 50,000	Hard	(Czech Republic) Ota Fukárek	(Australia) Tim Crichton (Australia) Ashley Fisher
26.02.	France	Challenger Ford de Cherbourg-Octeville	$ 37.500	Hard (i)	(Bulgaria) Orlin Stanoytchev	(Austria) Julian Knowle (Switzerland) Lorenzo Manta

=== March ===
Date	Country	Tournament	Prizemoney	Surface	Singles champion	Doubles champions
05.03.	Japan	Shimadzu All Japan Indoor Tennis Championships	$ 25,000	Carpet (i)	(Netherlands) John van Lottum	(Israel) Noam Behr (Israel) Noam Okun
12.03.	Germany	Residenza Open Magdeburg	$ 25,000	Carpet (i)	(Germany) Axel Pretzsch	(Canada) Frédéric Niemeyer (Czech Republic) Radek Štěpánek
12.03.	Australia	Perth Challenger	$ 25,000	Hard	(Greece) Vasilis Mazarakis	(Australia) Stephen Huss (Australia) Lee Pearson
12.03.	Ecuador	Abierto Internacional de Salinas	$ 25,000	Hard	(Argentina) David Nalbandian	(Peru) Luis Horna (Argentina) David Nalbandian
19.03.	Portugal	Espinho Open	$ 25,000	Clay	(Spain) Félix Mantilla	(Belgium) Wim Neefs (Netherlands) Djalmar Sistermans
19.03.	New Zealand	Hamilton Challenger	$ 25,000	Hard	(Sweden) Björn Rehnquist	(Israel) Noam Behr (Israel) Noam Okun
26.03.	Italy	Torneo Internazionale di Tennis Città della Disfida Open	$ 25,000	Clay	(Spain) Félix Mantilla	(Spain) Germán Puentes (Spain) Jairo Velasco Jr.

=== April ===
Date	Country	Tournament	Prizemoney	Surface	Singles champion	Doubles champions
02.04.	United States	USTA Challenger of Calabasas	$ 25,000	Hard	(Brazil) André Sá	(Czech Republic) Ota Fukárek (Germany) Ivo Heuberger
09.04.	Mexico	San Luis Potosí Challenger	$ 50,000	Clay	(Argentina) Martín Rodríguez	(Argentina) Edgardo Massa (Argentina) Sergio Roitman
16.04.	Bermuda	XL Bermuda Open	$ 100,000	Clay	(Argentina) José Acasuso	(United States) Paul Goldstein (United States) Andy Roddick

=== May ===
Date	Country	Tournament	Prizemoney	Surface	Singles champion	Doubles champions
07.05.	United States	Birmingham Challenger	$ 50,000	Clay	(Georgia (country)) Irakli Labadze	(United States) James Blake (The Bahamas) Mark Merklein
07.05.	Israel	Jerusalem Challenger	$ 50,000	Hard	(Israel) Noam Okun	(France) Jonathan Erlich (France) Michaël Llodra
07.05.	Uzbekistan	Fergana Challenger	$ 25,000	Hard	(Switzerland) Ivo Heuberger	(South Africa) Rik de Voest (Russia) Igor Kunitsyn
14.05.	United States	Belmont Farms USTA Challenger	$ 50,000	Clay	(Czech Republic) Jan Vacek	(The Bahamas) Mark Merklein (United States) Mitch Sprengelmeyer
14.05.	Croatia	Zagreb Open	$ 50,000	Clay	(Spain) Jacobo Díaz	(Argentina) Enzo Artoni (Argentina) Andrés Schneiter
14.05.	Belgium	Antwerp Challenger	$ 25,000	Clay	(Belgium) Dick Norman	(Spain) Juan Giner (Canada) Jerry Turek
14.05.	Great Britain	Edinburgh Challenger	$ 25,000	Clay	(Denmark) Kristian Pless	(Italy) Filippo Messori (Spain) Salvador Navarro
14.05.	Czech Republic	ECM Prague Open	$ 25,000	Clay	(Czech Republic) Ctislav Doseděl	(Czech Republic) Jaroslav Levinský (Czech Republic) Michal Navrátil
21.05.	Hungary	Budapest Challenger I	$ 25,000	Clay	(Italy) Giorgio Galimberti	(Brazil) Daniel Melo (Argentina) Sergio Roitman
28.05.	Romania	Compaq Challenger	$ 25,000	Clay	(Georgia (country)) Irakli Labadze	(The Bahamas) Mark Merklein (South Africa) Paul Rosner
28.05.	Brazil	Aberto da Costa do Sauípe	$ 25,000	Hard	(Brazil) André Sá	(Brazil) Adriano Ferreira (Brazil) Daniel Melo

=== June ===
Date	Country	Tournament	Prizemoney	Surface	Singles champion	Doubles champions
04.06.	Czech Republic	Unicredit Czech Open	$ 100,000	Clay	(Czech Republic) Bohdan Ulihrach	(Italy) Andrea Gaudenzi (Netherlands) Sander Groen
04.06.	Germany	Quelle Cup	$ 50,000	Clay	(Spain) Germán Puentes	(United States) Hugo Armando (Russia) Andrei Stoliarov
04.06.	Great Britain	Surbiton Trophy	$ 50,000	Grass	(United States) Taylor Dent	(South Africa) David Adams (Australia) Ben Ellwood
04.06.	United States	Tallahassee Tennis Challenger	$ 50,000	Hard	(Paraguay) Ramón Delgado	(Australia) Matthew Breen (Australia) Lee Pearson
11.06.	Italy	Top Wool Challenger	$ 100,000	Clay	(Romania) Adrian Voinea	(Italy) Enzo Artoni (Argentina) Andrés Schneiter
11.06.	Germany	ATU Cup	$ 50,000	Clay	(Czech Republic) Jiří Vaněk	(Spain) Julián Alonso (United States) Hugo Armando
18.06.	Germany	Nord/LB Open	$ 125,000	Clay	(Italy) Andrea Gaudenzi	(Germany) Karsten Braasch (Germany) Jens Knippschild
18.06.	Switzerland	Challenger Lugano	$ 50,000	Clay	(Czech Republic) Jiří Vaněk	(Australia) Steven Randjelovic (Hungary) Attila Sávolt
25.06.	Andorra	Open Internacional d’Andorra	$ 25,000	Hard (i)	(Israel) Noam Okun	(Russia) Denis Golovanov (Finland) Tuomas Ketola
25.06.	Germany	Wartburg Open	$ 25,000	Clay	(Germany) Oliver Gross	(Switzerland) Yves Allegro (Romania) Gabriel Trifu
25.06.	Italy	Memorial Savigni	$ 25,000	Clay	(Hungary) Attila Sávolt	(Spain) Didac Pérez (Spain) Gabriel Trujillo Soler

=== July ===
Date	Country	Tournament	Prizemoney	Surface	Singles champion	Doubles champions
02.07.	Italy	Venice Challenger	$ 100,000	Clay	(Belgium) Christophe Rochus	(The Bahamas) Mark Merklein (United States) Mitch Sprengelmeyer
02.07.	Germany	Müller Cup	$ 50,000	Clay	(Russia) Nikolay Davydenko	(Czech Republic) František Čermák (Czech Republic) David Škoch
02.07.	Brazil	Intelig Tennis Cup	$ 25,000	Hard	(Brazil) Ricardo Mello	(Mexico) Alejandro Hernández (Brazil) André Sá
02.07.	France	Open de Montauban	$ 25,000	Clay	(Germany) Oliver Gross	(Argentina) Diego del Río (Uzbekistan) Vadim Kutsenko
09.07.	Netherlands	Samsung Open	$ 75,000	Clay	(Netherlands) Raemon Sluiter	(Australia) Jordan Kerr (Australia) Grant Silcock
09.07.	Great Britain	Bristol Challenger Trophy	$ 50,000	Grass	(United Kingdom) Jamie Delgado	(South Africa) Wesley Moodie (South Africa) Shaun Rudman
09.07.	Canada	Granby Challenger	$ 50,000	Hard	(Germany) Axel Pretzsch	(Canada) Bobby Kokavec (United States) Jeff Morrison
09.07.	Brazil	Tess Tennis Classic	$ 25,000	Clay	(Italy) Alessio di Mauro	(Argentina) Edgardo Massa (Argentina) Leonardo Olguín
09.07.	Italy	Challenger Canottieri Mincio	$ 25,000	Clay	(Argentina) Diego Hipperdinger	(Italy) Stefano Galvani (Spain) Salvador Navarro
09.07.	Germany	Oberstaufen Cup	$ 25,000	Clay	(Germany) Oliver Gross	(Slovakia) Karol Beck (Slovakia) Branislav Sekáč
16.07.	United States	USTA Seascape Challenger	$ 50,000	Hard	(United States) Jeff Salzenstein	(United States) Brandon Hawk (United States) Robert Kendrick
16.07.	Great Britain	Manchester Trophy	$ 50,000	Grass	(France) Jean-François Bachelot	(Australia) Ben Ellwood (Sweden) Fredrik Lovén
23.07.	Brazil	Credicard Mastercard Tennis Cup	$ 75,000	Hard	(Paraguay) Ramón Delgado	(Australia) Dejan Petrović (Israel) Andy Ram
23.07.	Finland	Amer-Wilson Tampere ATP Tournament	$ 50,000	Clay	(Finland) Jarkko Nieminen	(Australia) Stephen Huss (Australia) Lee Pearson
23.07.	Hungary	Stella Artois Clay Court Championships	$ 25,000	Clay	(Argentina) Juan Ignacio Chela	(Czech Republic) Petr Dezort (Czech Republic) Radomír Vašek
30.07.	San Marino	San Marino CEPU Open	$ 100,000	Clay	(Costa Rica) Juan Antonio Marín	(Czech Republic) František Čermák (Czech Republic) David Škoch
30.07.	Spain	Open Castilla y León	$ 100,000	Hard	(Argentina) Juan Ignacio Chela	(South Africa) Wesley Moodie (South Africa) Shaun Rudman
30.07.	United States	Fifth Third Bank Tennis Classic	$ 50,000	Hard	(United States) Paul Goldstein	(South Africa) John-Laffnie de Jager (South Africa) Robbie Koenig
30.07.	Brazil	BH Tennis Open International Cup	$ 25,000	Hard	(United States) Eric Taino	(Australia) Dejan Petrović (Israel) Andy Ram
30.07.	Great Britain	Wrexham Challenger	$ 25,000	Hard	(Germany) Michael Kohlmann	(Belgium) Gilles Elseneer (Germany) Alexander Popp

=== August ===
Date	Country	Tournament	Prizemoney	Surface	Singles champion	Doubles champions
06.08.	Spain	Open Diputación Ciudad de Pozoblanco	$ 75,000	Hard	(Finland) Jarkko Nieminen	(Australia) Jordan Kerr (Australia) Grant Silcock
06.08.	United States	Time Warner USTA Challenger	$ 50,000	Hard	(France) Cedric Kauffmann	(Canada) Bobby Kokavec (Canada) Frédéric Niemeyer
06.08.	Austria	Skandia Open	$ 50,000	Clay	(Czech Republic) Jan Vacek	(North Macedonia) Aleksandar Kitinov (Australia) Todd Perry
06.08.	Brazil	Gramado Open de Tênis	$ 25,000	Hard	(United Kingdom) Barry Cowan	(Australia) Dejan Petrović (Israel) Andy Ram
06.08.	Italy	ATP Challenger Riviera delle Palme	$ 25,000	Clay	(Italy) Marzio Martelli	(Italy) Leonardo Azzaro (Italy) Stefano Galvani
06.08.	Russia	Togliatti Cup	$ 25,000	Hard	(Austria) Alexander Peya	(Slovakia) Karol Beck (Slovakia) Igor Zelenay
13.08.	United States	Bronx Challenger	$ 50,000	Hard	(Germany) Björn Phau	(United States) Kelly Gullett (Canada) Bobby Kokavec
13.08.	Austria	CA Challenge	$ 50,000	Hard	(Austria) Julian Knowle	(Australia) Tim Crichton (Australia) Todd Perry
13.08.	Poland	Sopot Challenger	$ 50,000	Clay	(Spain) David Ferrer	(Poland) Bartłomiej Dąbrowski (Poland) Marcin Matkowski
13.08.	Brazil	Brasília Challenger I	$ 25,000	Clay	(Argentina) Gastón Etlis	(Argentina) Gastón Etlis (Argentina) Leonardo Olguín
13.08.	Italy	Bressanone Challenger	$ 25,000	Clay	(Italy) Renzo Furlan	(Italy) Massimo Bertolini (Italy) Cristian Brandi
13.08.	Germany	Volvo Sylt Open	$ 25,000	Clay	(Spain) Salvador Navarro	(Netherlands) Dennis van Scheppingen (Netherlands) Bobbie Altelaar
20.08.	Switzerland	Geneva Challenger	$ 50,000	Clay	(Netherlands) Dennis van Scheppingen	(Argentina) Diego del Río (Bulgaria) Orlin Stanoytchev
20.08.	Brazil	Ribeirão Challenger	$ 50,000	Clay	(Argentina) Juan Ignacio Chela	(Brazil) Adriano Ferreira (Brazil) Antonio Prieto
20.08.	Italy	Manerbio Challenger	$ 25,000	Clay	(Hungary) Attila Sávolt	(Hungary) Attila Sávolt (Austria) Thomas Strengberger
20.08.	Germany	BMW Challenger Open	$ 25,000	Clay	(Austria) Jürgen Melzer	(Germany) Jens Knippschild (Spain) Jairo Velasco Jr.
27.08.	Brazil	Telesp Celular Open	$ 50,000	Clay	(Argentina) Juan Ignacio Chela	(Argentina) Edgardo Massa (Brazil) Flávio Saretta
27.08.	Germany	Black Forest Open	$ 37.500	Clay	(Spain) Albert Montañés	(Germany) Franz Stauder (Germany) Alexander Waske
27.08.	Italy	Brindisi Challenger	$ 25,000	Clay	(Italy) Federico Luzzi	(Italy) Daniele Bracciali (Italy) Giorgio Galimberti

=== September ===
Date	Country	Tournament	Prizemoney	Surface	Singles champion	Doubles champions
03.09.	Ukraine	Kiew Challenger	$ 125,000	Clay	(Spain) David Sánchez	(Australia) Jordan Kerr (Australia) Grant Silcock
03.09.	Brazil	Curitiba Challenger	$ 50,000	Clay	(Brazil) Flávio Saretta	(Australia) Tim Crichton (Australia) Ashley Fisher
03.09.	Germany	Rhein-Main Challenger	$ 37.500	Clay	(Germany) Simon Greul	(North Macedonia) Aleksandar Kitinov (Federal Republic of Yugoslavia) Dušan Vemić
03.09.	Romania	Brașov Challenger	$ 25,000	Clay	(Italy) Stefano Galvani	(Israel) Amir Hadad (Croatia) Lovro Zovko
10.09.	United States	Tarzana Challenger	$ 50,000	Hard	(United States) Levar Harper-Griffith	(United States) Zack Fleishman (United States) Michael Joyce
10.09.	Hungary	Budapest Challenger II	$ 25,000	Clay	(Spain) Didac Pérez	(Austria) Oliver Marach (Finland) Jarkko Nieminen
10.09.	Bulgaria	Sofia Challenger	$ 25,000	Clay	(Greece) Vasilis Mazarakis	(Italy) Igor Gaudi (Italy) Stefano Galvani
10.09.	Poland	Compaq Cup	$ 25,000	Clay	(Czech Republic) Ota Fukárek	(Austria) Julian Knowle (Germany) Michael Kohlmann
17.09.	Poland	Stettin Challenger	$ 125,000	Clay	(Argentina) Juan Ignacio Chela	(Poland) Mariusz Fyrstenberg (Poland) Marcin Matkowski
17.09.	Turkey	TED Open	$ 75,000	Hard	(Russia) Nikolay Davydenko	(Israel) Jonathan Erlich (France) Michaël Llodra
17.09.	Brazil	Florianópolis Challenger	$ 50,000	Clay	(Argentina) Edgardo Massa	(Argentina) Gastón Etlis (Argentina) Martín Rodríguez
17.09.	Spain	Copa Sevilla	$ 37.500	Clay	(Italy) Stefano Galvani	(Italy) Stefano Galvani (Italy) Vincenzo Santopadre
24.09.	Portugal	Maia Open	$ 125,000	Clay	(Finland) Jarkko Nieminen	(Spain) Juan Ignacio Carrasco (Netherlands) Djalmar Sistermans
24.09.	Slovenia	Kamnik Challenger	$ 25,000	Clay	(Croatia) Željko Krajan	(Czech Republic) Igor Brukner (Czech Republic) Jaroslav Levinský
24.09.	Uzbekistan	Samarkand Challenger	$ 25,000	Clay	(Uzbekistan) Oleg Ogorodov	(Russia) Denis Golovanov (Uzbekistan) Vadim Kutsenko
24.09.	Brazil	São Paulo Challenger I	$ 25,000	Clay	(Argentina) Edgardo Massa	(Brazil) Adriano Ferreira (Argentina) Edgardo Massa

=== October ===
Date	Country	Tournament	Prizemoney	Surface	Singles champion	Doubles champions
01.10.	Italy	Cagliari Challenger	$ 75,000	Clay	(Spain) Fernando Vicente	(Spain) Juan Ignacio Carrasco (Spain) Álex López Morón
01.10.	France	Grenoble Challenger	$ 75,000	Hard (i)	(Sweden) Johan Settergren	(Israel) Jonathan Erlich (Israel) Andy Ram
01.10.	Mexico	Guadalajara Challenger	$ 75,000	Clay	(Argentina) Agustín Calleri	(Argentina) Gastón Etlis (Argentina) Martin Rodriguez
01.10.	United States	Tulsa Challenger	$ 50,000	Hard	(Czech Republic) Jan Hernych	(United States) Mardy Fish (United States) Jeff Morrison
01.10.	Uzbekistan	Bukhara Challenger	$ 25,000	Hard	(Netherlands) John van Lottum	(Pakistan) Aisam-ul-Haq Qureshi (Netherlands) Rogier Wassen
08.10.	Peru	Lima Challenger	$ 75,000	Clay	(Argentina) Juan Ignacio Chela	(Italy) Enzo Artoni (Brazil) Daniel Melo
08.10.	Spain	Barcelona Challenger	$ 50,000	Clay	(Greece) Konstantinos Economidis	(Spain) Juan Ignacio Carrasco (Spain) Álex López Morón
08.10.	United States	Kerrville Challenger	$ 25,000	Hard	(United States) Alex Kim	(United States) Brandon Hawk (United States) Robert Kendrick
15.10.	Finland	Helsinki Challenger	$ 50,000	Carpet (i)	(Switzerland) George Bastl	(Australia) Tim Crichton (United States) Jim Thomas
15.10.	Brazil	Brasília Challenger II	$ 25,000	Clay	(Argentina) Sebastián Prieto	(Argentina) Luis Lobo (Argentina) Daniel Orsanic
15.10.	Ecuador	Quito Challenger	$ 25,000	Clay	(United States) Hugo Armando	(Brazil) Ricardo Schlachter (Netherlands) Rogier Wassen
22.10.	Brazil	São Paulo Challenger II	$ 75,000	Clay	(Argentina) Agustín Calleri	(Argentina) Agustín Calleri (Argentina) Edgardo Massa
22.10.	South Korea	Seoul Challenger	$ 50,000	Hard	(South Korea) Lee Hyung-taik	(Czech Republic) František Čermák (Czech Republic) Jaroslav Levinský
22.10.	United States	Houston Challenger	$ 25,000	Hard	(United States) Vince Spadea	(South Africa) Jeff Coetzee (South Africa) Paul Rosner
29.10.	Chile	Santiago Challenger	$ 75,000	Clay	(Chile) Marcelo Ríos	(Brazil) André Sá (Brazil) Alexandre Simoni
29.10.	Germany	Lambertz Open by STAWAG	$ 50,000	Carpet (i)	(Germany) Alexander Popp	(Austria) Julian Knowle (Germany) Michael Kohlmann
29.10.	Great Britain	Bolton Challenger	$ 25,000	Hard (i)	(Belgium) Olivier Rochus	(Belgium) Gilles Elseneer (Belgium) Wim Neefs
29.10.	United States	Burbank Challenger	$ 25,000	Hard	(United States) Kevin Kim	(United States) Scott Humphries (United States) Chris Woodruff
29.10.	Japan	Yokohama Challenger	$ 25,000	Carpet (i)	(Japan) Takao Suzuki	(Japan) Takao Suzuki (Japan) Mitsuru Takada

=== November ===
Date	Country	Tournament	Prizemoney	Surface	Singles champion	Doubles champions
05.11.	Slovakia	Bratislava Challenger	$ 100,000	Clay (i)	(Slovakia) Karol Kučera	(Czech Republic) Petr Luxa (Czech Republic) Radek Štěpánek
05.11.	Uruguay	Montevideo Challenger	$ 75,000	Clay	(Argentina) David Nalbandian	(Argentina) Diego del Río (Argentina) Martín Vassallo Argüello
05.11.	United States	UT Tyler Patriot Challenger	$ 50,000	Hard	(Israel) Noam Okun	(Australia) Stephen Huss (South Africa) Paul Rosner
05.11.	Germany	Okal Cup	$ 25,000	Carpet (i)	(Germany) Alexander Popp	(Switzerland) George Bastl (South Africa) Neville Godwin
12.11.	Argentina	Buenos Aires Challenger	$ 75,000	Clay	(Argentina) Agustín Calleri	(Argentina) Federico Browne (Argentina) Ignacio Hirigoyen
12.11.	United States	Knoxville Challenger	$ 50,000	Hard (i)	(United States) James Blake	(United States) Mardy Fish (United States) Jeff Morrison
19.11.	Venezuela	Caracas Challenger	$ 25,000	Hard	(Austria) Julian Knowle	(Austria) Julian Knowle (Germany) Michael Kohlmann
19.11.	Czech Republic	Prague Challenger	$ 25,000	Hard (i)	(Czech Republic) Ota Fukárek	(Czech Republic) Lukáš Dlouhý (Czech Republic) David Miketa
19.11.	Mexico	Puebla Challenger	$ 25,000	Hard	(Mexico) Miguel Gallardo Valles	(Israel) Jonathan Erlich (Israel) Andy Ram
26.11.	Costa Rica	Copa Ericsson Costa Rica	$ 75,000	Hard	(Germany) Michael Kohlmann	(Israel) Jonathan Erlich (Israel) Andy Ram
26.11.	Italy	Mailand Challenger	$ 50,000	Carpet (i)	(Switzerland) Marc Rosset	(Italy) Nicola Bruno (Italy) Gianluca Pozzi
26.11.	United States	Urbana Challenger	$ 50,000	Hard (i)	(Croatia) Ivo Karlović	(United States) Mardy Fish (United States) Jeff Morrison

=== December ===
Date	Country	Tournament	Prizemoney	Surface	Singles champion	Doubles champions
03.12.	Brazil	Rio de Janeiro Challenger	$ 25,000	Clay	(Denmark) Kristian Pless	(United States) Justin Gimelstob (Australia) David Macpherson
03.12.	Thailand	Bangkok Challenger	$ 25,000	Hard	(Thailand) Paradorn Srichaphan	(Czech Republic) Jaroslav Levinský (Pakistan) Aisam-ul-Haq Qureshi
