= 2000 Open 13 – Singles =

Singles
- 2000 Open 13

Final
- Champion: (Switzerland) Marc Rosset
- Runner-up: (Switzerland) Roger Federer
- Score: 2–6, 6–3, 7–6^{(7–5)}

Details
- Draw: 32 (4Q/3WC)
- Seeds: 8

Events
Singles	Doubles
← 1999 ·	Open 13	· 2001 →

Marc Rosset defeated Roger Federer 2–6, 6–3, 7–6^{(7–5)} to win the 2000 Open 13 singles competition.

Fabrice Santoro was the defending champion, but lost in the semifinals to Federer.

This was the first ATP Tour final of Roger Federer's career.

== Seeds ==
1. (Russia) Yevgeny Kafelnikov (second round)
2. (Sweden) Thomas Enqvist (second round)
3. (Slovakia) Dominik Hrbatý (first round)
4. (France) Sébastien Grosjean (semifinals)
5. (Russia) Marat Safin (first round)
6. (France) Fabrice Santoro (semifinals)
7. (Sweden) Thomas Johansson (second round)
8. (France) Arnaud Clément (second round)

== Draw ==
=== Key ===
- Q = Qualifier
- WC = Wild card
- LL = Lucky loser
- Alt = Alternate
- SE = Special exempt
- PR = Protected ranking
- ITF = ITF entry
- JE = Junior exempt
- w/o = Walkover
- r = Retired
- d = Defaulted
- SR = Special ranking

=== Finals ===
Semifinals
WC	(Switzerland) Roger Federer	7^{7}	7
6	(France) Fabrice Santoro	6^{4}	5
4	(France) Sébastien Grosjean	3	3
(Switzerland) Marc Rosset	6	6

Final
WC	(Switzerland) Roger Federer	6	3	6^{5}
(Switzerland) Marc Rosset	2	6	7^{7}

=== Top half ===
First round
1	(Russia) Y Kafelnikov	1	6	6
(Italy) G Pozzi	6	4	4
(Romania) A Voinea	3	6^{4}
(Croatia) I Ljubičić	6	7^{7}
WC	(Switzerland) R Federer	6	6
Q	(France) A Dupuis	4	4
(Switzerland) G Bastl	0	6^{3}
7	(Sweden) T Johansson	6	7^{7}
3	(Slovakia) D Hrbatý	6^{7}	4
(Slovakia) J Krošlák	7^{9}	6
(Bulgaria) O Stanoytchev	3	6	4
Q	(France) T Guardiola	6	1	6
Q	(France) G Raoux	6^{4}	6	6^{6}
(Netherlands) J Siemerink	7^{7}	3	7^{8}
(Netherlands) P Wessels	5	2
6	(France) F Santoro	7	6

Second round
1	(Russia) Y Kafelnikov	6^{5}	3
(Croatia) I Ljubičić	7^{7}	6
WC	(Switzerland) R Federer	6	6
7	(Sweden) T Johansson	3	2
3	(Slovakia) J Krošlák	3	3
Q	(France) T Guardiola	6	6
(Netherlands) J Siemerink	4	6	2
6	(France) F Santoro	6	1	6

Quarterfinals
(Croatia) I Ljubičić	2	6	6^{5}
WC	(Switzerland) R Federer	6	3	7^{7}
Q	(France) T Guardiola	4	6^{3}
6	(France) F Santoro	6	7^{7}

Semifinals
WC	(Switzerland) R Federer	7^{7}	7
6	(France) F Santoro	6^{4}	5

=== Bottom half ===
First round
WC/5	(Russia) M Safin	3	3
(Sweden) A Vinciguerra	6	6
(Sweden) J Björkman	5	2
(Spain) J Díaz	7	6
(Germany) J Knippschild	0^{r}
Q	(France) L Roux	3
(France) A di Pasquale	6^{3}	1
4	(France) S Grosjean	7^{7}	6
8	(France) A Clément	6	4	6
(Germany) A Pretsch	0	6	3
(Australia) W Arthurs	3	3
(Switzerland) M Rosset	6	6
WC	(France) C Saulnier	7^{7}	6^{11}	0
(Croatia) G Ivanišević	6^{2}	7^{13}	6
(Spain) A Portas	5	7	1
2	(Sweden) T Enqvist	7	5	6

Second round
(Sweden) A Vinciguerra	7^{7}	6
(Spain) J Díaz	6^{5}	2
Q	(France) L Roux	4	6	4
4	(France) S Grosjean	6	3	6
8	(France) A Clément	4	5
(Switzerland) M Rosset	6	7
(Croatia) G Ivanišević	6	6
2	(Sweden) T Enqvist	4	3

Quarterfinals
(Sweden) A Vinciguerra	4	4
4	(France) S Grosjean	6	6
(Switzerland) M Rosset	6	3	6
(Croatia) G Ivanišević	4	6	2

Semifinals
4	(France) S Grosjean	3	3
(Switzerland) M Rosset	6	6

== Qualifying ==
=== Qualifying seeds ===
1. (France) Antony Dupuis (qualified)
2. (France) Stéphane Huet (qualifying competition)
3. (Sweden) Nicklas Kulti (first round)
4. (France) Julien Boutter (qualifying competition)
5. (France) Thierry Guardiola (qualified)
6. (Czech Republic) Petr Kralert (first round)
7. (France) Guillaume Raoux (qualified)
8. (France) Michaël Llodra (first round)

=== Qualifiers ===
1. (France) Antony Dupuis
2. (France) Guillaume Raoux
3. (France) Lionel Roux
4. (France) Thierry Guardiola

=== Qualifying draw ===
==== First qualifier ====
First round
1	(France) Antony Dupuis	6	6
(Argentina) Leonardo Olguín	3	2
(France) Olivier Patience	6	6
(France) Olivier Mutis	4	3
WC	(France) Marc Bauer	3	3
WC	(France) Sébastien Lami	6	6
(France) Nicolas Coutelot	7^{7}	7^{7}
8	(France) Michaël Llodra	6^{4}	6^{3}

Second round
1	(France) Antony Dupuis	6	6
(France) Olivier Patience	3	3
WC	(France) Sébastien Lami	4	4
(France) Nicolas Coutelot	6	6

Qualifying competition
1	(France) Antony Dupuis	6	4	7
(France) Nicolas Coutelot	1	6	5

==== Second qualifier ====
First round
2	(France) Stéphane Huet	3	7^{8}	6
WC	(Algeria) Slimane Saoudi	6	6^{6}	1
(France) Guillaume Marx	1	7	7^{7}
(South Africa) Neville Godwin	6	5	6^{3}
(Netherlands) Rogier Wassen	6	2	7
(Argentina) Cristian Kordasz	4	6	5
(Spain) Sergi Bruguera	2	6^{3}
7	(France) Guillaume Raoux	6	7^{7}

Second round
2	(France) Stéphane Huet	7^{7}	6
(France) Guillaume Marx	6^{1}	2
(Netherlands) Rogier Wassen	6^{2}	1
7	(France) Guillaume Raoux	7^{7}	6

Qualifying competition
2	(France) Stéphane Huet	6	3	6^{4}
7	(France) Guillaume Raoux	4	6	7^{7}

==== Third qualifier ====
First round
3	(Sweden) Nicklas Kulti	1	4
(France) Lionel Roux	6	6
(France) Jean-François Bachelot	4^{r}
(France) Thomas Dupré	5
(Belgium) Johan Van Herck	1	5
(France) Grégory Carraz	6	7
(Argentina) Marcelo Charpentier	7^{7}	6^{3}	6
6	(Czech Republic) Petr Kralert	6^{4}	7^{7}	3

Second round
(France) Lionel Roux	6	3	6
(France) Thomas Dupré	2	6	4
(France) Grégory Carraz	7^{7}	6
(Argentina) Marcelo Charpentier	6^{5}	4

Qualifying competition
(France) Lionel Roux	6^{7}	6	6
(France) Grégory Carraz	7^{9}	2	4

==== Fourth qualifier ====
First round
4	(France) Julien Boutter	7	7^{7}
(Croatia) Željko Krajan	5	6^{5}
WC	(France) Nicolas Mahut	6	6
(Germany) Björn Phau	4	3
(France) Rodolphe Gilbert	7^{8}	6
(Italy) Davide Scala	6^{6}	2
(Norway) Jan Frode Andersen	4	3
5	(France) Thierry Guardiola	6	6

Second round
4	(France) Julien Boutter	4	7^{7}	6
WC	(France) Nicolas Mahut	6	6^{3}	3
(France) Rodolphe Gilbert	2^{r}
5	(France) Thierry Guardiola	4

Qualifying competition
4	(France) Julien Boutter	1	2
5	(France) Thierry Guardiola	6	6
