= 2002 Australian Open – Men's singles qualifying =

Men's singles qualifying
- 2002 Australian Open

Events
| Singles | men | women | | boys | girls |
| Doubles | men | women | mixed | boys | girls |
| WC Singles | men | women | quad |
| WC Doubles | men | women | quad |
| Legends | men | women | mixed |

Qualification
| Singles | men | women |
- Australian Open

This article displays the qualifying draw for the Men's Singles at the 2002 Australian Open.

== Seeds ==
1. (Georgia (country)) Irakli Labadze (qualifying competition, lucky loser)
2. (United States) Cecil Mamiit (qualified)
3. (Belgium) Olivier Rochus (qualified)
4. (Israel) Noam Okun (qualified)
5. (Switzerland) Ivo Heuberger (moved to main draw)
6. (Switzerland) George Bastl (qualifying competition)
7. (United States) Chris Woodruff (first round)
8. (Germany) Michael Kohlmann (qualified)
9. (Netherlands) Dennis van Scheppingen (first round)
10. (Switzerland) Marc Rosset (second round)
11. (Netherlands) Peter Wessels (first round)
12. (Netherlands) John van Lottum (first round)
13. (Austria) Julian Knowle (first round)
14. (United States) Vince Spadea (second round)
15. (South Africa) Neville Godwin (first round)
16. (Germany) Tomas Behrend (qualified)
17. (Costa Rica) Juan Antonio Marín (second round)
18. (Italy) Stefano Galvani (qualified)
19. (Peru) Luis Horna (second round)
20. (Netherlands) Raemon Sluiter (qualified)
21. (Germany) David Prinosil (first round)
22. (Uzbekistan) Oleg Ogorodov (second round)
23. (Chile) Fernando González (qualified)
24. (United States) Mardy Fish (qualified)
25. (Russia) Yuri Schukin (qualifying competition)
26. (United States) Paul Goldstein (qualifying competition)
27. (France) Nicolas Coutelot (qualifying competition)
28. (United Kingdom) Jamie Delgado (second round)
29. (Uzbekistan) Vadim Kutsenko (qualifying competition)
30. (Netherlands) Edwin Kempes (qualifying competition)
31. (Spain) Rubén Ramírez Hidalgo (second round)
32. (France) Cyril Saulnier (qualified)

== Qualifiers ==
1. (United States) Alex Kim
2. (United States) Cecil Mamiit
3. (Belgium) Olivier Rochus
4. (Israel) Noam Okun
5. (France) Olivier Patience
6. (France) Jean-François Bachelot
7. (Chile) Fernando González
8. (Germany) Michael Kohlmann
9. (United States) Jack Brasington
10. (France) Cyril Saulnier
11. (United States) Mardy Fish
12. (Netherlands) Raemon Sluiter
13. (Italy) Stefano Galvani
14. (France) Nicolas Thomann
15. (Zimbabwe) Byron Black
16. (Germany) Tomas Behrend

== Lucky loser ==
1. (Georgia (country)) Irakli Labadze

== Qualifying draw ==
Key

- Q = Qualifier
- WC = Wild card
- LL = Lucky loser
- Alt = Alternate
- ITF = ITF entry
- PR = Protected ranking
- SR = Special ranking
- SE = Special exempt
- JE = Junior exempt
- JR = Junior Accelerator Programme entrant
- CO = College Accelerator Programme entrant
- NG = Next Gen Accelerator Program entrant
- w/o = Walkover
- r = Retired
- d = Defaulted

=== First qualifier ===
First round
1 | (Georgia (country)) Irakli Labadze | 6 | 1 | 6
(Germany) Björn Phau | 0 | 6 | 2
(Brazil) Marcos Daniel | 6 | 2 | 6
(United States) Jeff Morrison | 3 | 6 | 4
WC | (Australia) Paul Baccanello | 2 | 3
(United States) Robby Ginepri | 6 | 6
(United States) Alex Kim | 6 | 6
21 | (Germany) David Prinosil | 2 | 2

Second round
1 | (Georgia (country)) Irakli Labadze | 6 | 7^{7}
(Brazil) Marcos Daniel | 4 | 6^{3}
(United States) Robby Ginepri | 6 | 4 | 2
(United States) Alex Kim | 4 | 6 | 6

Qualifying competition
1 | (Georgia (country)) Irakli Labadze | 3 | 4
(United States) Alex Kim | 6 | 6

=== Second qualifier ===
First round
2 | (United States) Cecil Mamiit | 6 | 6
WC | (Australia) Adam Kennedy | 0 | 1
(United States) Jeff Salzenstein | 4 | 4
PR | (Belgium) Réginald Willems | 6 | 6
(United States) Justin Gimelstob | 6 | 6
(Greece) Konstantinos Economidis | 2 | 2
(Israel) Andy Ram | 1 | 1
27 | (France) Nicolas Coutelot | 6 | 6

Second round
2 | (United States) Cecil Mamiit | 6 | 6
PR | (Belgium) Réginald Willems | 0 | 2
(United States) Justin Gimelstob | 3 | 3
27 | (France) Nicolas Coutelot | 6 | 6

Qualifying competition
2 | (United States) Cecil Mamiit | 6 | 6
27 | (France) Nicolas Coutelot | 1 | 3

=== Third qualifier ===
First round
3 | (Belgium) Olivier Rochus | 3 | 6 | 6
(Italy) Alessio di Mauro | 6 | 0 | 1
(Pakistan) Aisam-ul-Haq Qureshi | 6 | 6
(South Korea) Yoon Yong-il | 0 | 1
(Czech Republic) Tomáš Zíb | 1 | 4
(Canada) Daniel Nestor | 6 | 6
WC | (Australia) Ben Ellwood | 2 | 6^{4}
28 | (United Kingdom) Jamie Delgado | 6 | 7^{7}

Second round
3 | (Belgium) Olivier Rochus | 6 | 6
(Pakistan) Aisam-ul-Haq Qureshi | 2 | 1
(Canada) Daniel Nestor | 6 | 2 | 6
28 | (United Kingdom) Jamie Delgado | 4 | 6 | 3

Qualifying competition
3 | (Belgium) Olivier Rochus | 6 | 7^{7}
(Canada) Daniel Nestor | 4 | 6^{1}

=== Fourth qualifier ===
First round
4 | (Israel) Noam Okun | 6 | 7^{7}
(Austria) Werner Eschauer | 3 | 6^{3}
(Australia) Peter Luczak | 6 | 7^{7}
(Austria) Alexander Peya | 2 | 6^{2}
(Czech Republic) Petr Kralert | 1 | 6 | 6
(Brazil) Francisco Costa | 6 | 3 | 3
(Indonesia) Suwandi Suwandi | 3 | 6^{5}
31 | (Spain) Rubén Ramírez Hidalgo | 6 | 7^{7}

Second round
4 | (Israel) Noam Okun | 6 | 6
(Australia) Peter Luczak | 4 | 4
(Czech Republic) Petr Kralert | 7^{7} | 6^{3} | 6
31 | (Spain) Rubén Ramírez Hidalgo | 6^{5} | 7^{7} | 4

Qualifying competition
4 | (Israel) Noam Okun | 6 | 6
(Czech Republic) Petr Kralert | 3 | 0

=== Fifth qualifier ===
First round
Alt | (Algeria) Slimane Saoudi | 2 | 6^{1}
(Norway) Jan Frode Andersen | 6 | 7^{7}
(France) Olivier Patience | 3 | 6 | 6
(Brazil) Daniel Melo | 6 | 3 | 4
(United States) Kevin Kim | 4 | 0
(Austria) Zbynek Mlynarik | 6 | 6
(Mexico) Alejandro Hernández | 6 | 3 | 4
17 | (Costa Rica) Juan Antonio Marín | 4 | 6 | 6

Second round
(Norway) Jan Frode Andersen | 3 | 5
(France) Olivier Patience | 6 | 7
(Austria) Zbynek Mlynarik | 0 | 7 | 6
17 | (Costa Rica) Juan Antonio Marín | 6 | 5 | 3

Qualifying competition
(France) Olivier Patience | 6 | 6
(Austria) Zbynek Mlynarik | 3 | 2

=== Sixth qualifier ===
First round
6 | (Switzerland) George Bastl | 6 | 6
(United States) Glenn Weiner | 4 | 4
(Spain) Emilio Benfele Álvarez | 5 | 1
(Sweden) Björn Rehnquist | 7 | 6
(Argentina) Leonardo Olguín | 6 | 3 | 4
(France) Jean-François Bachelot | 1 | 6 | 6
(Argentina) Gastón Etlis | 6 | 3 | 3
19 | (Peru) Luis Horna | 2 | 6 | 6

Second round
6 | (Switzerland) George Bastl | 6 | 6
(Sweden) Björn Rehnquist | 4 | 4
(France) Jean-François Bachelot | 4 | 7 | 6
19 | (Peru) Luis Horna | 6 | 5 | 2

Qualifying competition
6 | (Switzerland) George Bastl | 4 | 6 | 2
(France) Jean-François Bachelot | 6 | 3 | 6

=== Seventh qualifier ===
First round
7 | (United States) Chris Woodruff | 3 | 7 | 2
(Belgium) Dick Norman | 6 | 5 | 6
(Spain) Carlos Cuadrado | 6 | 6
WC | (Australia) Alun Jones | 3 | 4
(United Kingdom) Barry Cowan | 3 | 4
(Croatia) Željko Krajan | 6 | 6
(Germany) Christian Vinck | 3 | 2
23 | (Chile) Fernando González | 6 | 6

Second round
(Belgium) Dick Norman | 6 | 3 | 7
(Spain) Carlos Cuadrado | 3 | 6 | 5
(Croatia) Željko Krajan | 3 | 3
23 | (Chile) Fernando González | 6 | 6

Qualifying competition
(Belgium) Dick Norman | 2 | 4
23 | (Chile) Fernando González | 6 | 6

=== Eighth qualifier ===
First round
8 | (Germany) Michael Kohlmann | 6 | 6
(United States) Eric Taino | 2 | 3
(Czech Republic) Petr Dezort | 6 | 6
(United States) Levar Harper-Griffith | 1 | 0
(United Kingdom) Arvind Parmar | 6 | 7^{7}
WC | (Australia) Chris Guccione | 4 | 6^{3}
(Netherlands) Martin Verkerk | 4 | 6^{9}
29 | (Uzbekistan) Vadim Kutsenko | 6 | 7^{11}

Second round
8 | (Germany) Michael Kohlmann | 6 | 6
(Czech Republic) Petr Dezort | 4 | 2
(United Kingdom) Arvind Parmar | 6^{6} | 3
29 | (Uzbekistan) Vadim Kutsenko | 7^{8} | 6

Qualifying competition
8 | (Germany) Michael Kohlmann | 6 | 6
29 | (Uzbekistan) Vadim Kutsenko | 3 | 4

=== Ninth qualifier ===
First round
9 | (Netherlands) Dennis van Scheppingen | 3 | 6^{3}
(France) Sébastien De Chaunac | 6 | 7^{7}
(United States) Jack Brasington | 6 | 6
(Japan) Gouichi Motomura | 2 | 4
(Italy) Leonardo Azzaro | 3 | 5
(Socialist Federal Republic of Yugoslavia) Nenad Zimonjić | 6 | 7
WC | (Australia) Raphael Durek | 6^{1} | 3
25 | (Russia) Yuri Schukin | 7^{7} | 6

Second round
(France) Sébastien De Chaunac | 3 | 5
(United States) Jack Brasington | 6 | 7
(Socialist Federal Republic of Yugoslavia) Nenad Zimonjić | 3 | 6^{4}
25 | (Russia) Yuri Schukin | 6 | 7^{7}

Qualifying competition
(United States) Jack Brasington | 6 | 6
25 | (Russia) Yuri Schukin | 1 | 0

=== Tenth qualifier ===
First round
10 | (Switzerland) Marc Rosset | 6 | 6
(Sweden) Daniel Andersson | 4 | 1
(Finland) Tuomas Ketola | 1 | 3
(United States) Robert Kendrick | 6 | 6
(Germany) Alexander Waske | 6 | 3 | 4
(Sweden) Kalle Flygt | 3 | 6 | 6
(Israel) Noam Behr | 2 | 6 | 3
32 | (France) Cyril Saulnier | 6 | 2 | 6

Second round
10 | (Switzerland) Marc Rosset | 3 | 4
(United States) Robert Kendrick | 6 | 6
(Sweden) Kalle Flygt | 3 | 3
32 | (France) Cyril Saulnier | 6 | 6

Qualifying competition
(United States) Robert Kendrick | 4 | 4
32 | (France) Cyril Saulnier | 6 | 6

=== Eleventh qualifier ===
First round
11 | (Netherlands) Peter Wessels | 1 | 2
(Russia) Artem Derepasko | 6 | 6
(Croatia) Lovro Zovko | 2 | 2
(Austria) Jürgen Melzer | 6 | 6
(United States) Bob Bryan | 2 | 6 | 6
(Japan) Takao Suzuki | 6 | 4 | 3
Alt | (Croatia) Ivan Vajda | 0 | 4
24 | (United States) Mardy Fish | 6 | 6

Second round
(Russia) Artem Derepasko | 6 | 5 | 6
(Austria) Jürgen Melzer | 4 | 7 | 4
(United States) Bob Bryan | 4 | 3
24 | (United States) Mardy Fish | 6 | 6

Qualifying competition
(Russia) Artem Derepasko | 2 | 1
24 | (United States) Mardy Fish | 6 | 6

=== Twelfth qualifier ===
First round
12 | (Netherlands) John van Lottum | 4 | 2
(Zimbabwe) Wayne Black | 6 | 6
(South Africa) Justin Bower | 6^{6} | 6 | 6
WC | (Australia) Morgan Wilson | 7^{8} | 0 | 2
(France) Julien Benneteau | 3 | 1
(France) Grégory Carraz | 6 | 6
(Morocco) Karim Alami | 6^{5} | 6 | 2
20 | (Netherlands) Raemon Sluiter | 7^{7} | 2 | 6

Second round
(Zimbabwe) Wayne Black | 6 | 3 | 6
(South Africa) Justin Bower | 4 | 6 | 3
(France) Grégory Carraz | 4 | 4
20 | (Netherlands) Raemon Sluiter | 6 | 6

Qualifying competition
(Zimbabwe) Wayne Black | 4 | 7 | 2
20 | (Netherlands) Raemon Sluiter | 6 | 5 | 6

=== Thirteenth qualifier ===
First round
13 | (Austria) Julian Knowle | 2 | 1
(France) Thomas Dupré | 6 | 6
(France) Jérôme Haehnel | 4 | 6 | 2
(Sweden) Fredrik Jonsson | 6 | 4 | 6
(France) Nicolas Mahut | 6^{5} | 6^{12}
(Croatia) Ivo Karlović | 7^{7} | 7^{14}
(Austria) Clemens Trimmel | 2 | 4
18 | (Italy) Stefano Galvani | 6 | 6

Second round
(France) Thomas Dupré | 4 | 6 | 6
(Sweden) Fredrik Jonsson | 6 | 2 | 2
(Croatia) Ivo Karlović | 4 | 3
18 | (Italy) Stefano Galvani | 6 | 6

Qualifying competition
(France) Thomas Dupré | 2^{r}
18 | (Italy) Stefano Galvani | 6

=== Fourteenth qualifier ===
First round
14 | (United States) Vince Spadea | 6 | 6
WC | (Australia) Dejan Petrovic | 2 | 1
(Slovakia) Ján Krošlák | 2 | 6 | 6
(France) Nicolas Thomann | 6 | 3 | 8
(Japan) Takahiro Terachi | 6 | 6
(Greece) Vasilis Mazarakis | 1 | 4
(Argentina) Sergio Roitman | 2 | 3
30 | (Netherlands) Edwin Kempes | 6 | 6

Second round
14 | (United States) Vince Spadea | 4 | 5
(France) Nicolas Thomann | 6 | 7
(Japan) Takahiro Terachi | 1 | 3
30 | (Netherlands) Edwin Kempes | 6 | 6

Qualifying competition
(France) Nicolas Thomann | 6 | 6
30 | (Netherlands) Edwin Kempes | 4 | 0

=== Fifteenth qualifier ===
First round
15 | (South Africa) Neville Godwin | 2 | 4
(Argentina) Diego Veronelli | 6 | 6
(Russia) Denis Golovanov | 6 | 6^{3} | 2
(Zimbabwe) Byron Black | 4 | 7^{7} | 6
WC | (Australia) Ryan Henry | 4 | 5
(Germany) Markus Hantschk | 6 | 7
(Spain) Iván Navarro | 6^{2} | 6^{3}
22 | (Uzbekistan) Oleg Ogorodov | 7^{7} | 7^{7}

Second round
(Argentina) Diego Veronelli | 3 | 6^{5}
(Zimbabwe) Byron Black | 6 | 7^{7}
(Germany) Markus Hantschk | 7^{8} | 6
22 | (Uzbekistan) Oleg Ogorodov | 6^{6} | 4

Qualifying competition
(Zimbabwe) Byron Black | 6 | 5 | 6
(Germany) Markus Hantschk | 4 | 7 | 4

=== Sixteenth qualifier ===
First round
16 | (Germany) Tomas Behrend | 7 | 6
(France) Cedric Kauffmann | 5 | 3
(Belgium) Gilles Elseneer | 4 | 5
(Israel) Amir Hadad | 6 | 7
(Spain) Juan Albert Viloca | 6 | 7
(Thailand) Danai Udomchoke | 4 | 5
(Austria) Oliver Marach | 1 | 3
26 | (United States) Paul Goldstein | 6 | 6

Second round
16 | (Germany) Tomas Behrend | 7^{10} | 2 | 7
(Israel) Amir Hadad | 6^{8} | 6 | 5
(Spain) Juan Albert Viloca | 4 | 3
26 | (United States) Paul Goldstein | 6 | 6

Qualifying competition
16 | (Germany) Tomas Behrend | 6 | 6^{4} | 6
26 | (United States) Paul Goldstein | 3 | 7^{7} | 4
