= 2000 Open 13 =

- Date: 7–14 February
- Edition: 8th
- Category: International Series
- Draw: 32S/ 16D
- Prize money: $475,000
- Surface: Hard / indoor
- Location: Marseille, France

Champions

Singles
- (Switzerland) Marc Rosset

Doubles
- (Sweden) Simon Aspelin / (Sweden) Johan Landsberg
- Open 13

The 2000 Open 13 was an ATP men's tennis tournament held in Marseille, France that was part of the International Series of the 2000 ATP Tour. It was the seventh edition of the tournament and was held from 7 February until 14 February 2000. Unseeded Marc Rosset won the singles title, his third at the event after winning the first two editions in 1993 and 1994.

== Finals ==
=== Singles ===
(Switzerland) Marc Rosset defeated (Switzerland) Roger Federer 2–6, 6–3, 7–6^{(7–5)}

- It was Rosset's 1st singles title of the year and the 14th of his career.

=== Doubles ===
(Sweden) Simon Aspelin / (Sweden) Johan Landsberg defeated (Spain) Juan Ignacio Carrasco / (Spain) Jairo Velasco, Jr. 7–6^{(7–2)}, 6–4

- It was Aspelin's only title of the year and the 1st of his career. It was Landsberg's only title of the year and the 1st of his career.
