= 1999 Open 13 =

- Date: 1–8 February
- Edition: 7th
- Category: World Series
- Draw: 32S/ 16D
- Prize money: $514,250
- Surface: Hard / indoor
- Location: Marseille, France

Champions

Singles
- (France) Fabrice Santoro

Doubles
- (Belarus) Max Mirnyi / (Russia) Andrei Olhovskiy
- Open 13

The 1999 Open 13 was an ATP men's tennis tournament held in Marseille, France that was part of the World Series of the 1999 ATP Tour. It was the seventh edition of the tournament and was held from 1 February until 8 February 1999. Unseeded Fabrice Santoro won the singles title.

== Finals ==
=== Singles ===
(France) Fabrice Santoro defeated (France) Arnaud Clément, 6–3, 4–6, 6–4

- It was Santoro's only singles title of the year and the 2nd of his career.

=== Doubles ===
(Belarus) Max Mirnyi / (Russia) Andrei Olhovskiy defeated (South Africa) David Adams / (Czech Republic) Pavel Vízner, 7–5, 7–6^{(9–7)}

- It was Mirnyi's 1st title of the year and the 2nd of his career. It was Olhovskiy's 1st title of the year and the 18th of his career.
