= Jairo Velasco =

Jairo Velasco may refer to:

- Jairo Velasco, Sr. (born 1947), Colombian-born tennis player
- Jairo Velasco, Jr. (born 1974), his son, Spanish tennis player
