= 1999 Open 13 – Doubles =

Doubles
- 1999 Open 13

Final
- Champions: (Belarus) Max Mirnyi (Russia) Andrei Olhovskiy
- Runners-up: (South Africa) David Adams (Czech Republic) Pavel Vízner
- Score: 7–5, 7–6

Events
Singles	Doubles
← 1998 ·	Open 13	· 2000 →

Donald Johnson and Francisco Montana were the defending champions, but lost in the semifinals this year.

Max Mirnyi and Andrei Olhovskiy won the title, defeating David Adams and Pavel Vízner 7–5, 7–6 in the final.

== Seeds ==
1. (Russia) Yevgeny Kafelnikov / (Czech Republic) Daniel Vacek (first round)
2. (United States) Donald Johnson / (United States) Francisco Montana (semifinals)
3. (South Africa) Piet Norval / (Zimbabwe) Kevin Ullyett (quarterfinals)
4. (Spain) Tomás Carbonell / (United States) Justin Gimelstob (quarterfinals)

== Draw ==
=== Key ===
- Q = Qualifier
- WC = Wild card
- LL = Lucky loser
- Alt = Alternate
- ITF = ITF entry
- PR = Protected ranking
- SR = Special ranking
- SE = Special exempt
- JE = Junior exempt
- JR = Junior Accelerator Programme entrant
- CO = College Accelerator Programme entrant
- NG = Next Gen Accelerator Program entrant
- w/o = Walkover
- r = Retired
- d = Defaulted

=== Finals ===
First round
1	(Russia) Y Kafelnikov (Czech Republic) D Vacek	6	1
(Sweden) P Nyborg (Germany) D Prinosil	7	6
(Italy) M Bertolini (Italy) C Brandi	6	4
WC	(France) J Golmard (France) G Raoux	7	6
3	(South Africa) P Norval (Zimbabwe) K Ullyett	6	7
(North Macedonia) A Kitinov (United States) J Tarango	1	6
Q	(Spain) J Balcells (Romania) A Pavel	3	4
(South Africa) D Adams (Czech Republic) P Vízner	6	6
(United Kingdom) N Broad (Netherlands) M Oosting	6	3
(Belarus) M Mirnyi (Russia) A Olhovskiy	7	6
(United States) M Keil (Netherlands) T Kempers	7	4	2
4	(Spain) T Carbonell (United States) J Gimelstob	6	6	6
WC	(France) A Clément (France) N Escudé	6	4	3
(South Africa) L Bale (South Africa) M Barnard	1	6	6
WC	(Spain) C Moyá (Russia) M Safin	6	7	5
2	(United States) D Johnson (United States) F Montana	7	5	7

Quarterfinals
(Sweden) P Nyborg (Germany) D Prinosil	4	3
WC	(France) J Golmard (France) G Raoux	6	6
3	(South Africa) P Norval (Zimbabwe) K Ullyett	6	2	4
(South Africa) D Adams (Czech Republic) P Vízner	3	6	6
(Belarus) M Mirnyi (Russia) A Olhovskiy	7	6
4	(Spain) T Carbonell (United States) J Gimelstob	5	4
(South Africa) L Bale (South Africa) M Barnard	4	2
2	(United States) D Johnson (United States) F Montana	6	6

Semifinals
WC	(France) J Golmard (France) G Raoux	6	1
(South Africa) D Adams (Czech Republic) P Vízner	7	6
(Belarus) M Mirnyi (Russia) A Olhovskiy	6	6
2	(United States) D Johnson (United States) F Montana	2	3

Final
(South Africa) D Adams (Czech Republic) P Vízner	5	6
(Belarus) M Mirnyi (Russia) A Olhovskiy	7	7
