= Ciutat de Barcelona Tennis Tournament =

Tennis tournament in Spain

Defunct tennis tournament
- Tour: ATP Challenger Tour
- Founded: 1993
- Abolished: 2006
- Location: Barcelona, Spain
- Surface: Clay

The Ciutat de Barcelona Tennis Tournament is a defunct tennis tournament for male professional players that was considered one of the best challengers on the ATP Tour. The event was held annually in Barcelona, Catalonia, from 1993 to 2006 on clay courts.

== Past finals ==
=== Singles ===
Year	Champion	Runner-up	Score
1993	(Sweden) Jonas Svensson	(Spain) Federico Sánchez	6–4, 7–5
1994	(Spain) Alberto Berasategui	(Germany) Carl-Uwe Steeb	6–3, 7–5
1995	(Spain) Jordi Burillo	(Spain) Carlos Moyà	6–3, 6–3
1996	(Uruguay) Marcelo Filippini	(Slovakia) Dominik Hrbatý	6–4, 6–4
1997	(Spain) Carlos Costa	(Spain) Juan Antonio Marín	6–1, 6–4
1998	(Spain) Fernando Vicente	(Norway) Jan Frode Andersen	6–3, 6–3
1999	(Spain) Fernando Vicente	(Armenia) Sargis Sargsian	6–2, 1–6, 6–2
2000	(Spain) Albert Portas	(Spain) Óscar Serrano	3–6, 6–4, 6–3
2001	(Greece) Konstantinos Economidis	(France) Nicolas Coutelot	7-6(4), 6-1
2002	(Spain) Rubén Ramírez Hidalgo	(Spain) Albert Portas	4–6, 6–4, 6–1
2003	(Spain) Albert Portas	(Spain) Albert Montañés	6–4, 6–4
2004	(Switzerland) Stanislas Wawrinka	(Belgium) Kristof Vliegen	6–4, 6–3
2005	(Argentina) Sergio Roitman	(Russia) Teymuraz Gabashvili	6–2, 6–3
2006	(Spain) Marcel Granollers	(Spain) Óscar Hernández	6–4, 6–1

=== Doubles ===
Year	Champion	Runner-up	Score
1993	(Spain) Jordi Burillo (Spain) Sergio Casal	(Venezuela) Maurice Ruah (Cuba) Mario Tabares	6–2, 4–6, 6–1
1994	(Spain) Sergio Casal (Spain) Emilio Sánchez	(Spain) Francisco Clavet (Spain) Àlex Corretja	6–2, 7–5
1995	(Argentina) Luis Lobo (Spain) Javier Sánchez	(Spain) José Antonio Conde (Portugal) Nuno Marques	6–4, 6–7(6), 6–4
1996	(Argentina) Luis Lobo (Spain) Javier Sánchez	(Ecuador) Nicolás Lapentti (France) Fabrice Santoro	ABD (no winner)
1997	(Egypt) Tamer El Sawy (Portugal) Nuno Marques	(Romania) Dinu Pescariu (Italy) Davide Sanguinetti	6–1, 6–2
1998	(Spain) José Antonio Conde (Spain) Javier Sánchez	(Italy) Massimo Bertolini (Italy) Cristian Brandi	4–6, 6–4, 6–3
1999	(Spain) Eduardo Nicolás (Spain) Germán Puentes	(Spain) Alberto Martín (Spain) Javier Sánchez	7-6(1), 7-6(5)
2000	(Spain) Tomás Carbonell (Spain) Albert Portas	(Germany) Marcus Hilpert (Germany) Jens Knippschild	5–7, 6–1, 6–4
2001	(Spain) Juan Ignacio Carrasco (Spain) Álex López Morón	(Czech Republic) František Čermák (Czech Republic) David Škoch	6–4, 6–1
2002	(Spain) Emilio Benfele Álvarez (Argentina) Mariano Hood	(Germany) Karsten Braasch (Sweden) Peter Nyborg	6–4, 6–4
2003	(Spain) Juan Ignacio Carrasco (Argentina) Mariano Delfino	(Italy) Enzo Artoni (Argentina) Sergio Roitman	7–5, 6–3
2004	(Spain) Emilio Benfele Álvarez (Spain) Gabriel Trujillo Soler	(Argentina) Ignacio González King (Argentina) Diego Moyano	4–6, 6–3, 6–4
2005	(Spain) Óscar Hernández (Spain) Gabriel Trujillo Soler	(Spain) Álex López Morón (Spain) Albert Portas	7–5, 6–4
2006	(Germany) Tomas Behrend (Italy) Flavio Cipolla	(Spain) Pablo Andújar (Spain) Marcel Granollers	6–3, 6–2

== See also ==
- List of tennis tournaments
