= 1999 Open 13 – Singles =

Singles
- 1999 Open 13

Final
- Champion: (France) Fabrice Santoro
- Runner-up: (France) Arnaud Clément
- Score: 6–3, 4–6, 6–4

Details
- Draw: 32 (4 Q / 3 WC )
- Seeds: 8

Events
Singles	Doubles
← 1998 ·	Open 13	· 2000 →

Fabrice Santoro defeated Arnaud Clément 6–3, 4–6, 6–4 to win the 1999 Open 13 singles competition. Thomas Enqvist was the champion but did not defend his title.

== Seeds ==
1. (Spain) Carlos Moyà (first round)
2. (Russia) Yevgeny Kafelnikov (second round)
3. (France) Cédric Pioline (semifinals)
4. (Switzerland) Marc Rosset (semifinals)
5. (Sweden) Magnus Gustafsson (first round)
6. (France) Nicolas Escudé (quarterfinals)
7. (Czech Republic) Daniel Vacek (first round)
8. (Russia) Marat Safin (first round)

== Draw ==
=== Key ===
- Q = Qualifier
- WC = Wild card
- LL = Lucky loser
- Alt = Alternate
- SE = Special exempt
- PR = Protected ranking
- ITF = ITF entry
- JE = Junior exempt
- w/o = Walkover
- r = Retired
- d = Defaulted
- SR = Special ranking

=== Finals ===
Semifinals
WC	(France) Arnaud Clément	6	6
3	(France) Cédric Pioline	4	1
4	(Switzerland) Marc Rosset	4	4
(France) Fabrice Santoro	6	6

Final
WC	(France) Arnaud Clément	3	6	4
(France) Fabrice Santoro	6	4	6

=== Top half ===
First round
1	(Spain) C Moyà	6^{1}	6	3
WC	(Switzerland) R Federer	7^{7}	3	6
(Romania) A Voinea	2	2
(France) J Golmard	6	6
WC	(France) A Clément	6	6
(Spain) F Vicente	3	1
Q	(France) J Boutter	6	7^{7}
8	(Russia) M Safin	4	6^{2}
3	(France) C Pioline	6	6
(United States) J Tarango	4	2
Q	(Sweden) F Jonsson	6^{5}	6^{3}
(Ukraine) A Medvedev	7^{7}	7^{7}
(Romania) A Pavel	6	7
(Spain) G Blanco	4	5
(Morocco) K Alami	1	7^{7}	6^{2}
6	(France) N Escudé	6	6^{2}	7^{7}

Second round
WC	(Switzerland) R Federer	6^{6}	7^{7}	7^{7}
(France) J Golmard	7^{8}	6^{5}	6^{5}
WC	(France) A Clément	6	6
Q	(France) J Boutter	2	3
3	(France) C Pioline	7	7
(Ukraine) A Medvedev	5	5
(Romania) A Pavel	6	6^{2}	5
6	(France) N Escudé	0	7^{7}	7

Quarterfinals
WC	(Switzerland) R Federer	3	3
WC	(France) A Clément	6	6
3	(France) C Pioline	7^{9}	7^{7}
6	(France) N Escudé	6^{7}	6^{5}

Semifinals
WC	(France) A Clément	6	6
3	(France) C Pioline	4	1

=== Bottom half ===
First round
5	(Sweden) M Gustafsson	3	4
(France) G Raoux	6	6
(Italy) G Pozzi	7	6
(France) L Roux	5	0
(Germany) D Prinosil	6^{4}	6	3
(Denmark) K Carlsen	7^{7}	4	6
Q	(France) C Saulnier	2	6	1
4	(Switzerland) M Rosset	6	3	6
7	(Czech Republic) D Vacek	2	3
(France) F Santoro	6	6
(United States) J Gimelstob	6	1	4
(France) A di Pasquale	4	6	6
(Costa Rica) J A Marín	2	1
Q	(Slovakia) D Hrbatý	6	6
(Netherlands) S Schalken	3	2
WC/2	(Russia) Y Kafelnikov	6	6

Second round
(France) G Raoux	6	4	4
(Italy) G Pozzi	4	6	6
(Denmark) K Carlsen	3	2
4	(Switzerland) M Rosset	6	6
(France) F Santoro	6	6
(France) A di Pasquale	1	3
Q	(Slovakia) D Hrbatý	6^{4}	6	6
WC/2	(Russia) Y Kafelnikov	7^{7}	4	2

Quarterfinals
(Italy) G Pozzi	2	1
4	(Switzerland) M Rosset	6	6
(France) F Santoro	6	6
Q	(Slovakia) D Hrbatý	4	3

Semifinals
4	(Switzerland) M Rosset	4	4
(France) F Santoro	6	6
