= Wim Neefs =

Belgian tennis player

- Country (sports): Belgium
- Born: 8 March 1976 (age 49)
- Plays: Right-handed
- Prize money: $28,227

Singles
- Highest ranking: No. 471 (24 August 1998)

Doubles
- Career record: 0–1
- Highest ranking: No. 177 (14 January 2002)

Wim Neefs (born 8 March 1976) is a Belgian former professional tennis player.

Neefs made his only ATP Tour main draw appearance in the doubles at the 1997 European Community Championships, which was held in his home province of Antwerp. He won two doubles titles on the ATP Challenger Tour.

== Challenger titles ==
=== Doubles: (2) ===
No.	Date	Tournament	Surface	Partner	Opponents	Score
1.	April 2001	Espinho, Portugal	Clay	(Netherlands) Djalmar Sistermans	(Spain) Germán Puentes (Spain) Jairo Velasco Jr.	6–3, 7–6^{(2)}
2.	November 2001	Bolton, Great Britain	Hard	(Belgium) Gilles Elseneer	(United Kingdom) Lee Childs (United Kingdom) Mark Hilton	6–4, 6–3
