= Djalmar Sistermans =

Dutch tennis player

- Country (sports): Netherlands
- Born: 24 December 1976 (age 48)
- Prize money: $26,015

Singles
- Highest ranking: No. 669 (5 October 1998)

Doubles
- Highest ranking: No. 140 (18 March 2002)

Grand Slam doubles results
- Wimbledon: Q2 (2002)

Djalmar Sistermans (born 24 December 1976) is a Dutch former professional tennis player.

Sistermans reached a career high ranking of 140 in doubles and won two ATP Challenger doubles titles.

At Wimbledon in 2002 he and Ignacio Hirigoyen came close to qualifying for the main draw when they played a marathon final round qualifier against Amir Hadad and Aisam Qureshi, which they lost 13–15 in the fifth set.

== Challenger titles ==
=== Doubles: (2) ===
No.	Date	Tournament	Surface	Partner	Opponents	Score
1.	April 2001	Espinho, Portugal	Clay	(Belgium) Wim Neefs	(Spain) Germán Puentes (Spain) Jairo Velasco Jr.	6–3, 7–6^{(2)}
2.	September 2001	Maia, Portugal	Clay	(Spain) Juan Ignacio Carrasco	(Portugal) Emanuel Couto (Portugal) Bernardo Mota	7–5, 3–6, 7–5
