= Johan Landsberg =

Swedish tennis player

- Country (sports): Sweden
- Born: 30 December 1974 (age 50); Stockholm, Sweden
- Height: 1.83 m (6 ft 0 in)
- Turned pro: 1997
- Plays: Right-handed
- Coach: Ted Mellin
- Prize money: $444,539

Singles
- Career record: 0–3
- Career titles: 0
- Highest ranking: No. 513 (25 October 1999)

Doubles
- Career record: 78–109
- Career titles: 2
- Highest ranking: No. 48 (9 October 2000)

Grand Slam doubles results
- Australian Open: 3R (2000)
- French Open: 2R (2001, 2003)
- Wimbledon: 2R (2001, 2004, 2005)
- US Open: 3R (2002)

Mixed doubles

Grand Slam mixed doubles results
- French Open: 1R (2000)
- Wimbledon: QF (2002)

Johan Landsberg (born 30 December 1974) is a former professional tennis player from Sweden.

== Career ==
Landsberg, a doubles specialist, competed in 21 Grand Slam men's doubles tournaments over the course of his career. He also played mixed doubles in five of those events, the 2000 French Open and every Wimbledon Championship from 2000 to 2003. His best result in the mixed was making the quarter-finals of the 2002 Wimbledon Championships, partnering countrywoman Åsa Svensson. In the men's doubles he twice reached the third round, the first time being his Grand Slam debut, at the 2000 Australian Open. Landsberg and his partner Simon Aspelin defeated the number six seeds in that tournament, South Africans David Adams and John-Laffnie de Jager. His second appearance in the third round appearance came in the 2002 US Open, with Tom Vanhoudt. His other men's doubles partners at Grand Slam level were Stephen Huss, Thomas Johansson, Aleksandar Kitinov, Jarkko Nieminen Peter Nyborg, Robin Söderling and Jeff Tarango.

The Swede won two ATP doubles titles during his career, at the 2000 Open 13 and in Bucharest the following year. He made his final ATP World Tour appearance in the 2007 Swedish Open and now coaches Finnish tennis player Harri Heliövaara.

== ATP career finals ==
=== Doubles: 3 (2–1) ===
Result	W/L	Date	Tournament	Surface	Partner	Opponents	Score
Win	1–0	Feb 2000	Marseille, France	Hard	(Sweden) Simon Aspelin	(Spain) Juan Ignacio Carrasco (Spain) Jairo Velasco, Jr.	7–6^{(7–2)}, 6–4
Loss	1–1	Feb 2001	Milan, Italy	Carpet	(Belgium) Tom Vanhoudt	(Netherlands) Paul Haarhuis (Netherlands) Sjeng Schalken	6–7^{(5–7)}, 6–7^{(4–7)}
Win	2–1	Sep 2001	Bucharest, Romania	Clay	(North Macedonia) Aleksandar Kitinov	(Argentina) Pablo Albano (Germany) Marc-Kevin Goellner	6–4, 6–7^{(5–7)}, [10–6]

== Challenger titles ==
=== Doubles: (6) ===
No.	Year	Tournament	Surface	Partner	Opponents	Score
1.	1999	Kyiv, Ukraine	Clay	(Sweden) Simon Aspelin	(Hungary) Gábor Köves (Austria) Thomas Strengberger	6–3, 4–6, 6–2
2.	2002	Heilbronn, Germany	Carpet	(North Macedonia) Aleksandar Kitinov	(Czech Republic) František Čermák (Czech Republic) Ota Fukárek	6–7^{(5–7)}, 6–3, 6–1
3.	2003	Heilbronn, Germany	Carpet	(Sweden) Simon Aspelin	(Czech Republic) Petr Pála (Czech Republic) Pavel Vízner	6–4, 6–4
4.	2005	Budapest, Hungary	Clay	(Australia) Stephen Huss	(Israel) Amir Hadad (Israel) Harel Levy	7–6^{(7–4)}, 6–1
5.	2005	Granby, Canada	Hard	(Chinese Taipei) Lu Yen-hsun	(Canada) Philip Bester (Canada) Frank Dancevic	4–6, 7–6^{(7–5)}, 7–5
6.	2005	Kolding, Denmark	Carpet	(Australia) Stephen Huss	(Denmark) Frederik Nielsen (Denmark) Rasmus Nørby	1–6, 7–6^{(7–4)}, [10–8]
