= Open 13 =

Coordinates: 43.271°N 5.401°E

Defunct tennis tournament
- Founded: 1993
- Editions: 33 (2025)
- Location: Marseille; France
- Venue: Palais des sports de Marseille
- Category: ATP World Series (1993–1997); ATP International Series (1998–2008); ATP Tour 250 (2009–2025)
- Surface: Hard (indoor)
- Draw: 28S / 16Q / 16D
- Prize money: €707,510 (2023)
- Website: open13.fr

Current champions (2025)
- Singles: (France) Ugo Humbert
- Doubles: (France) Benjamin Bonzi (France) Pierre-Hugues Herbert

The Open 13 was an annual men's tennis tournament played in Marseille, France. The tournament was an ATP Tour 250 series event on the Association of Tennis Professionals tour. The number 13 is the INSEE code of the Bouches-du-Rhône département of which Marseille is the capital. It was held for one week in February at the Palais des sports de Marseille on indoor hardcourts, where the Centre Court has a capacity of 5,800 seats. The tournament was held from 1993 until 2026 when it was relocated to Lyon.

In 2025, the tournament was one of three French events of the ATP Tour 250 series, along with the Open Occitanie and the Moselle Open. It was one of four with the Lyon Open until 2025.

== History ==
The event was first held in 1993. It was the project of ex-professional tennis player and native of Marseille Jean-François Caujolle, who remains tournament director to this day.

The Swiss player Marc Rosset won the singles title at the first two editions of the event in 1993 and 1994. He also won it for a 3rd time in 2000. Rosset, Thomas Enqvist and Jo-Wilfried Tsonga hold the record for most titles with 3 each.

Roger Federer played his first ATP singles final at this tournament in 2000, losing to Marc Rosset. Their match was the first all-Swiss final of an ATP event. Federer went on to win the title in 2003.

Other notable winners include former world No. 1 ranked players and Grand Slam champions Boris Becker, Yevgeny Kafelnikov, Andy Murray and Juan Martin del Potro. French players have won the most titles at this event, 9 in singles and 11 in doubles.

== Past finals ==
=== Singles ===
Year	Champions	Runners-up	Score
1993	(Switzerland) Marc Rosset	(Netherlands) Jan Siemerink	6–2, 7–6^{(7–1)}
1994	(Switzerland) Marc Rosset (2)	(France) Arnaud Boetsch	7–6^{(8–6)}, 7–6^{(7–4)}
1995	(Germany) Boris Becker	(Czech Republic) Daniel Vacek	6–7^{(2–7)}, 6–4, 7–5
1996	(France) Guy Forget	(France) Cédric Pioline	7–5, 6–4
1997	(Sweden) Thomas Enqvist	(Chile) Marcelo Ríos	6–4, 1–0, ret.
1998	(Sweden) Thomas Enqvist (2)	(Russia) Yevgeny Kafelnikov	6–4, 6–1
1999	(France) Fabrice Santoro	(France) Arnaud Clément	6–3, 4–6, 6–4
2000	(Switzerland) Marc Rosset (3)	(Switzerland) Roger Federer	2–6, 6–3, 7–6^{(7–5)}
2001	(Russia) Yevgeny Kafelnikov	(France) Sébastien Grosjean	7–6^{(7–5)}, 6–2
2002	(Sweden) Thomas Enqvist (3)	(France) Nicolas Escudé	6–7^{(4–7)}, 6–3, 6–1
2003	(Switzerland) Roger Federer	(Sweden) Jonas Björkman	6–2, 7–6^{(8–6)}
2004	(Slovakia) Dominik Hrbatý	(Sweden) Robin Söderling	4–6, 6–4, 6–4
2005	(Sweden) Joachim Johansson	(Croatia) Ivan Ljubičić	7–5, 6–4
2006	(France) Arnaud Clément	(Croatia) Mario Ančić	6–4, 6–2
2007	(France) Gilles Simon	(Cyprus) Marcos Baghdatis	6–4, 7–6^{(7–3)}
2008	(United Kingdom) Andy Murray	(Croatia) Mario Ančić	6–3, 6–4
2009	(France) Jo-Wilfried Tsonga	(France) Michaël Llodra	7–5, 7–6^{(7–3)}
2010	(France) Michaël Llodra	(France) Julien Benneteau	6–3, 6–4
2011	(Sweden) Robin Söderling	(Croatia) Marin Čilić	6–7^{(8–10)}, 6–3, 6–3
2012	(Argentina) Juan Martín del Potro	(France) Michaël Llodra	6–4, 6–4
2013	(France) Jo-Wilfried Tsonga (2)	(Czech Republic) Tomáš Berdych	3–6, 7–6^{(8–6)}, 6–4
2014	(Latvia) Ernests Gulbis	(France) Jo-Wilfried Tsonga	7–6^{(7–5)}, 6–4
2015	(France) Gilles Simon (2)	(France) Gaël Monfils	6–4, 1–6, 7–6^{(7–4)}
2016	(Australia) Nick Kyrgios	(Croatia) Marin Čilić	6–2, 7–6^{(7–3)}
2017	(France) Jo-Wilfried Tsonga (3)	(France) Lucas Pouille	6–4, 6–4
2018	(Russia) Karen Khachanov	(France) Lucas Pouille	7–5, 3–6, 7–5
2019	(Greece) Stefanos Tsitsipas	(Kazakhstan) Mikhail Kukushkin	7–5, 7–6^{(7–5)}
2020	(Greece) Stefanos Tsitsipas (2)	(Canada) Félix Auger-Aliassime	6–3, 6–4
2021	(Russia) Daniil Medvedev	(France) Pierre-Hugues Herbert	6–4, 6–7^{(4–7)}, 6–4
2022	(Russia) Andrey Rublev	(Canada) Félix Auger-Aliassime	7–5, 7–6^{(7–4)}
2023	(Poland) Hubert Hurkacz	(France) Benjamin Bonzi	6–3, 7–6^{(7–4)}
2024	(France) Ugo Humbert	(Bulgaria) Grigor Dimitrov	6–4, 6–3
2025	(France) Ugo Humbert (2)	(Serbia) Hamad Medjedovic	7–6^{(7–4)}, 6–4

=== Doubles finals ===
Year	Champions	Runners-up	Score
1993	(France) Arnaud Boetsch (France) Olivier Delaître	(Czech Republic) Ivan Lendl (South Africa) Christo van Rensburg	6–3, 7–6
1994	(Netherlands) Jan Siemerink (Czech Republic) Daniel Vacek	(Czech Republic) Martin Damm (Russia) Yevgeny Kafelnikov	6–7, 6–4, 6–1
1995	(South Africa) David Adams (Russia) Andrei Olhovskiy	(France) Jean-Philippe Fleurian (France) Rodolphe Gilbert	6–1, 6–4
1996	(France) Jean-Philippe Fleurian (France) Guillaume Raoux	(South Africa) Marius Barnard (Sweden) Peter Nyborg	6–3 6–2
1997	(Sweden) Thomas Enqvist (Sweden) Magnus Larsson	(France) Olivier Delaître (France) Fabrice Santoro	6–3, 6–4
1998	(United States) Donald Johnson (United States) Francisco Montana	(United States) Mark Keil (United States) T. J. Middleton	6–4, 3–6, 6–3
1999	(Belarus) Max Mirnyi (Russia) Andrei Olhovskiy	(South Africa) David Adams (Czech Republic) Pavel Vízner	7–5, 7–6^{(9–7)}
2000	(Sweden) Simon Aspelin (Sweden) Johan Landsberg	(Spain) Juan Ignacio Carrasco (Spain) Jairo Velasco, Jr.	7–6^{(7–2)}, 6–4
2001	(France) Julien Boutter (France) Fabrice Santoro	(Australia) Michael Hill (United States) Jeff Tarango	7–6^{(9–7)}, 7–5
2002	(France) Arnaud Clément (France) Nicolas Escudé	(France) Julien Boutter (Belarus) Max Mirnyi	6–4, 6–3
2003	(France) Sébastien Grosjean (France) Fabrice Santoro (2)	(Czech Republic) Tomáš Cibulec (Czech Republic) Pavel Vízner	6–1, 6–4
2004	(The Bahamas) Mark Knowles (Canada) Daniel Nestor	(Czech Republic) Martin Damm (Czech Republic) Cyril Suk	7–5, 6–3
2005	(Czech Republic) Martin Damm (Czech Republic) Radek Štěpánek	(The Bahamas) Mark Knowles (Canada) Daniel Nestor	7–6^{(7–4)}, 7–6^{(7–5)}
2006	(Czech Republic) Martin Damm (2) (Czech Republic) Radek Štěpánek (2)	(The Bahamas) Mark Knowles (Canada) Daniel Nestor	6–2, 6–7^{(4–7)}, [10–3]
2007	(France) Arnaud Clément (2) (France) Michaël Llodra	(The Bahamas) Mark Knowles (Canada) Daniel Nestor	7–5, 4–6, [10–8]
2008	(Czech Republic) Martin Damm (3) (Czech Republic) Pavel Vízner	(Switzerland) Yves Allegro (South Africa) Jeff Coetzee	7–6^{(7–0)}, 7–5
2009	(France) Arnaud Clément (3) (France) Michaël Llodra (2)	(Austria) Julian Knowle (Israel) Andy Ram	3–6, 6–3, [10–8]
2010	(France) Julien Benneteau (France) Michaël Llodra (3)	(Austria) Julian Knowle (Sweden) Robert Lindstedt	6–4, 6–3
2011	(Netherlands) Robin Haase (United Kingdom) Ken Skupski	(France) Julien Benneteau (France) Jo-Wilfried Tsonga	6–4, 6–7^{(4–7)}, [13–11]
2012	(France) Nicolas Mahut (France) Édouard Roger-Vasselin	(Germany) Dustin Brown (France) Jo-Wilfried Tsonga	3–6, 6–4, [10–6]
2013	(India) Rohan Bopanna (United Kingdom) Colin Fleming	(Pakistan) Aisam-ul-Haq Qureshi (Netherlands) Jean-Julien Rojer	6–4, 7–6^{(7–3)}
2014	(France) Julien Benneteau (2) (France) Édouard Roger-Vasselin (2)	(Australia) Paul Hanley (United Kingdom) Jonathan Marray	4–6, 7–6^{(8–6)}, [13–11]
2015	(Croatia) Marin Draganja (Finland) Henri Kontinen	(United Kingdom) Colin Fleming (United Kingdom) Jonathan Marray	6–4, 3–6, [10–8]
2016	(Croatia) Mate Pavić (New Zealand) Michael Venus	(Israel) Jonathan Erlich (United Kingdom) Colin Fleming	6–2, 6–3
2017	(France) Julien Benneteau (3) (France) Nicolas Mahut (2)	(Netherlands) Robin Haase (United Kingdom) Dominic Inglot	6–4, 6–7^{(9–11)}, [10–5]
2018	(South Africa) Raven Klaasen (New Zealand) Michael Venus (2)	(New Zealand) Marcus Daniell (United Kingdom) Dominic Inglot	6–7^{(2–7)}, 6–3, [10–4]
2019	(France) Jérémy Chardy (France) Fabrice Martin	(Japan) Ben McLachlan (Netherlands) Matwé Middelkoop	6–3, 6–7^{(4–7)}, [10–3]
2020	(France) Nicolas Mahut (3) (Canada) Vasek Pospisil	(Netherlands) Wesley Koolhof (Croatia) Nikola Mektić	6–3, 6–4
2021	(United Kingdom) Lloyd Glasspool (Finland) Harri Heliövaara	(Netherlands) Sander Arends (Netherlands) David Pel	7–5, 7–6^{(7–4)}
2022	(Ukraine) Denys Molchanov (Russia) Andrey Rublev	(South Africa) Raven Klaasen (Japan) Ben McLachlan	4–6, 7–5, [10–7]
2023	(Mexico) Santiago González (France) Édouard Roger-Vasselin	(France) Nicolas Mahut (France) Fabrice Martin	4–6, 7–6^{(7–4)}, [10–7]
2024	(Czech Republic) Tomáš Macháč (China) Zhang Zhizhen	(Finland) Emil Ruusuvuori (Finland) Patrik Niklas-Salminen	6–3, 6–4
2025	(France) Benjamin Bonzi (France) Pierre-Hugues Herbert	(Belgium) Sander Gillé (Poland) Jan Zieliński	6–3, 6–4
