= Albert Portas =

Spanish tennis player (born 1973)

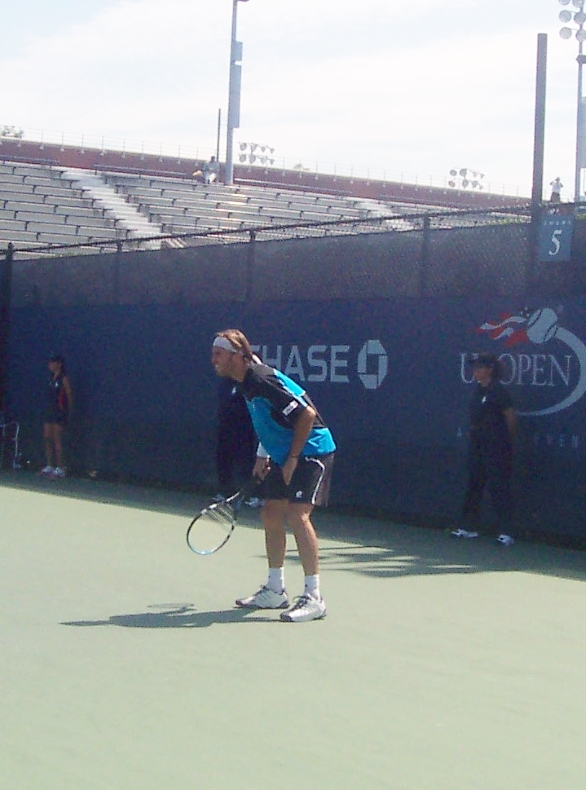
- Country (sports): Spain
- Born: 15 November 1973 (age 52) Barcelona, Spain
- Height: 1.88 m (6 ft 2 in)
- Turned pro: 1994
- Retired: 2007
- Plays: Right-handed (two-handed backhand)
- Prize money: $2,972,633

Singles
- Career record: 142–198
- Career titles: 1
- Highest ranking: No. 19 (1 October 2001)

Grand Slam singles results
- Australian Open: 2R (2000, 2002)
- French Open: 3R (1997, 2000, 2002)
- Wimbledon: 3R (2000)
- US Open: 3R (2001)

Doubles
- Career record: 73–109
- Career titles: 1
- Highest ranking: No. 56 (14 April 2003)

Grand Slam doubles results
- Australian Open: QF (2003)
- French Open: 2R (2001, 2002, 2006)
- Wimbledon: 1R (2000, 2001, 2003, 2006)
- US Open: 1R (1999, 2000, 2001, 2002, 2003)

Grand Slam mixed doubles results
- Wimbledon: 1R (2001)
Medal record
Summer Universiade
Silver medal – second place	1999 Palma	Singles
- Last updated on: 18 November 2021.

Albert Portas Soy (Catalan: [əlˈβɛɾ(t) ˈpɔɾtəs ˈsɔj], Spanish: [alˈβeɾ ˈpoɾtas ˈsoj]; born 15 November 1973) is a Spanish former professional tennis player. He reached his career-high singles ranking of World No. 19 in October 2001.

== Career ==
Portas turned professional in 1994.

His first and only top-level singles title came at the 2001 Hamburg Masters tournament, where as a qualifier (and ranked No. 42 in the world) he defeated Juan Carlos Ferrero in the final. His mastery of the drop shot (key to his victory in the final) earned him the nickname "Drop Shot Dragon". According to the BBC, Lleyton Hewitt said of Portas that "He sure hits a lot of drop shots, but he hits them so well, as well as anyone I have faced." His final at Barcelona Open in 1997 was also very remarkable. En route to the final he defeated Gustavo Kuerten (eventual champion this same year of French Open), Marcelo Ríos, and Carlos Moyá, but lost in the final to Albert Costa. In 1999, Portas lost the final of San Marino defeated by his countryman Galo Blanco.

Immediately after his retirement from playing tennis in September 2007, Portas started coaching WTA player Daniela Hantuchová, whom he coached from 2007 to 2012.

== Performance timelines ==
Key
W	F	SF	QF	#R	RR	Q#	DNQ	A	NH

(W) winner; (F) finalist; (SF) semifinalist; (QF) quarterfinalist; (#R) rounds 4, 3, 2, 1; (RR) round-robin stage; (Q#) qualification round; (DNQ) did not qualify; (A) absent; (NH) not held; (SR) strike rate (events won / competed); (W–L) win–loss record.

=== Singles ===
Tournament	1994	1995	1996	1997	1998	1999	2000	2001	2002	2003	2004	2005	2006	2007	SR	W–L	Win %
Grand Slam tournaments
Australian Open	A	A	A	A	1R	1R	2R	1R	2R	1R	1R	A	A	A	0 / 7	2–7	22%
French Open	A	Q1	Q1	3R	1R	2R	3R	1R	3R	2R	1R	Q1	1R	Q1	0 / 9	8–9	47%
Wimbledon	Q2	A	A	A	1R	1R	3R	1R	1R	1R	A	A	1R	Q1	0 / 7	2–7	22%
US Open	A	A	A	1R	A	1R	1R	3R	1R	1R	A	Q1	A	A	0 / 6	2–6	25%
Win–loss	0–0	0–0	0–0	2–2	0–3	1–4	5–4	2–4	3–4	1–4	0–2	0–0	0–2	0–0	0 / 29	14–29	33%
ATP Masters Series
Indian Wells	A	A	A	A	1R	A	A	A	1R	A	A	A	A	A	0 / 2	0–2	0%
Miami	A	A	A	A	A	A	A	1R	3R	A	A	A	A	A	0 / 2	1–2	33%
Monte Carlo	A	2R	A	A	1R	Q1	1R	2R	1R	2R	1R	A	Q1	1R	0 / 8	3–8	27%
Hamburg	A	A	A	A	1R	Q1	Q2	W	1R	A	2R	A	Q1	A	1 / 4	7–3	70%
Rome	A	Q1	A	2R	1R	1R	1R	2R	1R	1R	Q2	A	A	A	0 / 7	2–7	22%
Canada	A	A	A	A	A	A	A	1R	A	A	A	A	A	A	0 / 1	0–1	0%
Cincinnati	A	A	A	A	A	A	A	1R	A	A	A	A	A	A	0 / 1	0–1	0%
Stuttgart	A	A	A	1R	A	A	A	1R	Not Masters Series						0 / 2	0–2	0%
Paris	A	A	A	1R	A	A	A	2R	A	A	A	A	A	A	0 / 2	1–2	33%
Win–loss	0–0	1–1	0–0	1–3	0–4	0–1	0–2	9–7	1–5	1–2	1–2	0–0	0–0	0–1	1 / 29	14–28	33%

=== Doubles ===
Tournament	1998	1999	2000	2001	2002	2003	2004	2005	2006	SR	W–L	Win %
Grand Slam tournaments
Australian Open	A	A	2R	2R	1R	QF	2R	A	A	0 / 5	6–5	55%
French Open	A	A	1R	2R	2R	1R	A	A	2R	0 / 5	3–5	38%
Wimbledon	A	A	1R	1R	A	1R	A	A	1R	0 / 4	0–4	0%
US Open	A	1R	1R	1R	1R	1R	A	A	A	0 / 5	0–5	0%
Win–loss	0–0	0–1	1–4	2–4	1–3	3–4	1–1	0–0	1–2	0 / 19	9–19	32%
ATP Masters Series
Miami	A	A	A	1R	A	A	A	A	A	0 / 1	0–1	0%
Monte Carlo	A	A	Q1	A	A	A	A	A	A	0 / 0	0–0	–
Hamburg	Q1	A	1R	2R	A	A	A	A	A	0 / 2	1–2	33%
Rome	1R	A	A	Q1	1R	A	A	A	A	0 / 2	0–2	0%
Stuttgart	A	A	A	1R	Not Masters Series					0 / 1	0–1	0%
Paris	A	A	A	1R	A	A	A	A	A	0 / 1	0–1	0%
Win–loss	0–1	0–0	0–1	1–4	0–1	0–0	0–0	0–0	0–0	0 / 7	1–7	13%

== ATP career finals ==
=== Singles: 4 (1 title, 3 runner-ups) ===
Legend Grand Slam Tournaments (0–0) ATP World Tour Finals (0–0) ATP Masters 1000 (1–0) ATP 500 Series (0–1) ATP 250 Series (0–2)	Finals by surface Hard (0–0) Clay (1–3) Grass (0–0) Carpet (0–0)	Finals by setting Outdoors (1–3) Indoors (0–0)

Result	W–L	Date	Tournament	Tier	Surface	Opponent	Score
Loss	0–1	Apr 1997	Barcelona, Spain	Championship Series	Clay	(Spain) Albert Costa	5–7, 4–6, 4–6
Loss	0–2	Aug 1999	San Marino, San Marino	World Series	Clay	(Spain) Galo Blanco	6–4, 4–6, 3–6
Win	1–2	May 2001	Hamburg, Germany	Masters 1000	Clay	(Spain) Juan Carlos Ferrero	4–6, 6–2, 0–6, 7–6^{(7–5)}, 7–5
Loss	1–3	Jul 2001	Sopot, Poland	World Series	Clay	(Spain) Tommy Robredo	6–1, 5–7, 6–7^{(2–7)}

=== Doubles: 4 (1 title, 3 runner-ups) ===
Legend Grand Slam Tournaments (0–0) ATP World Tour Finals (0–0) ATP Masters 1000 (0–0) ATP 500 Series (0–0) ATP 250 Series (1–3)	Finals by surface Hard (0–0) Clay (1–3) Grass (0–0) Carpet (0–0)	Finals by setting Outdoors (1–3) Indoors (0–0)

Result	W–L	Date	Tournament	Tier	Surface	Partner	Opponents	Score
Loss	0–1	Nov 1996	Santiago, Chile	World Series	Clay	(Romania) Dinu Pescariu	(Brazil) Gustavo Kuerten (Brazil) Fernando Meligeni	4–6, 2–6
Win	1–1	Jul 2000	Umag, Croatia	World Series	Clay	(Spain) Álex López Morón	(Croatia) Ivan Ljubičić (Croatia) Lovro Zovko	6–1, 7–6^{(7–2)}
Loss	1–2	Jul 2002	Umag, Croatia	World Series	Clay	(Spain) Fernando Vicente	(Czech Republic) František Čermák (Austria) Julian Knowle	4–6, 4–6
Loss	1–3	Jul 2006	Umag, Croatia	World Series	Clay	(Spain) Guillermo García López	(Czech Republic) Jaroslav Levinský (Czech Republic) David Škoch	4–6, 4–6

== ATP Challenger and ITF Futures finals ==
=== Singles: 19 (8–11) ===
Legend ATP Challenger (8–11) ITF Futures (0–0)	Finals by surface Hard (0–0) Clay (8–11) Grass (0–0) Carpet (0–0)

Result	W–L	Date	Tournament	Tier	Surface	Opponent	Score
Loss	0–1	Jul 1994	Prague, Czech Republic	Challenger	Clay	(Czech Republic) Jiří Novák	2–6, 5–7
Win	1–1	Jul 1995	Prague, Czech Republic	Challenger	Clay	(Morocco) Hicham Arazi	6–7, 6–4, 6–4
Win	2–1	Apr 1997	Prague, Czech Republic	Challenger	Clay	(Spain) Fernando Vicente	6–1, 6–4
Loss	2–2	Aug 1997	Graz, Austria	Challenger	Clay	(Czech Republic) Radomír Vašek	1–6, 3–6
Loss	2–3	Aug 1998	Graz, Austria	Challenger	Clay	(Spain) Carlos Costa	5–7, 6–7
Win	3–3	Oct 1998	Cairo, Egypt	Challenger	Clay	(Spain) Alberto Martín	6–2, 1–6, 6–3
Win	4–3	Oct 2000	Barcelona, Spain	Challenger	Clay	(Spain) Óscar Serrano	3–6, 6–4, 6–3
Win	5–3	Oct 2000	Cairo, Egypt	Challenger	Clay	(Czech Republic) Jiří Vaněk	7–5, 6–3
Loss	5–4	Aug 2002	San Marino, San Marino	Challenger	Clay	(Argentina) José Acasuso	6–3, 3–6, 2–6
Loss	5–5	Oct 2002	Seville, Spain	Challenger	Clay	(France) Olivier Mutis	3–6, 5–7
Loss	5–6	Oct 2002	Barcelona, Spain	Challenger	Clay	(Spain) Rubén Ramírez Hidalgo	6–4, 4–6, 1–6
Loss	5–7	Oct 2002	Cairo, Egypt	Challenger	Clay	(Italy) Stefano Galvani	2–6, 7–6, 6–1
Loss	5–8	Mar 2003	Barletta, Italy	Challenger	Clay	(Spain) Rafael Nadal	2–6, 6–7^{(2–7)}
Loss	5–9	Sep 2003	Szczecin, Poland	Challenger	Clay	(Chile) Nicolás Massú	4–6, 3–6
Win	6–9	Oct 2003	Barcelona, Spain	Challenger	Clay	(Spain) Albert Montañés	6–4, 6–4
Win	7–9	Jun 2005	Furth, Germany	Challenger	Clay	(Germany) Philipp Kohlschreiber	7–6^{(7–5)}, 6–2
Loss	7–10	Jul 2005	Oberstaufen, Germany	Challenger	Clay	(Germany) Simon Greul	5–7, 2–6
Win	8–10	Aug 2005	Vigo, Spain	Challenger	Clay	(Spain) Iván Navarro	6–4, 6–4
Loss	8–11	Oct 2005	Barcelona, Spain	Challenger	Clay	(Spain) Fernando Vicente	2–6, 2–6

=== Doubles: 22 (12–10) ===
Legend ATP Challenger (12–10) ITF Futures (0–0)	Finals by surface Hard (0–1) Clay (12–9) Grass (0–0) Carpet (0–0)

Result	W–L	Date	Tournament	Tier	Surface	Partner	Opponents	Score
Win	1–0	Sep 1996	Tashkent, Uzbekistan	Challenger	Clay	(Argentina) Marcelo Charpentier	(Russia) Andrei Cherkasov (Italy) Laurence Tieleman	6–1, 6–2
Loss	1–1	Apr 1997	Barletta, Italy	Challenger	Clay	(Spain) Alberto Martín	(Portugal) Nuno Marques (Belgium) Tom Vanhoudt	3–6, 4–6
Loss	1–2	Aug 1997	Graz, Austria	Challenger	Clay	(Spain) Alberto Martín	(Argentina) Lucas Arnold Ker (Belgium) Tom Vanhoudt	1–6, 2–6
Win	2–2	Jun 1998	Furth, Germany	Challenger	Clay	(Spain) Álex López Morón	(Spain) Juan Ignacio Carrasco (Argentina) Martín Rodríguez	6–4, 6–4
Win	3–2	Aug 1998	Graz, Austria	Challenger	Clay	(Romania) Dinu Pescariu	(South Africa) Lan Bale (Socialist Federal Republic of Yugoslavia) Nebojša Đorđević	6–3, 6–4
Win	4–2	Oct 1998	Cairo, Egypt	Challenger	Clay	(Spain) Álex López Morón	(Spain) Alberto Martín (Spain) Salvador Navarro-Gutierrez	4–6, 6–3, 6–2
Win	5–2	Jun 1999	Braunschweig, Germany	Challenger	Clay	(Spain) Germán Puentes	(Spain) Tomás Carbonell (Socialist Federal Republic of Yugoslavia) Nebojša Đorđević	6–4, 6–7^{(3–7)}, 6–3
Win	6–2	Jul 1999	Venice, Italy	Challenger	Clay	(Spain) Germán Puentes	(Argentina) Diego del Río (Argentina) Mariano Hood	6–4, 6–0
Loss	6–3	Jul 1999	Graz, Austria	Challenger	Clay	(Spain) Germán Puentes	(Portugal) Nuno Marques (Belgium) Tom Vanhoudt	2–6, 2–6
Loss	6–4	Oct 1999	Cairo, Egypt	Challenger	Clay	(Spain) Álex López Morón	(Spain) Juan Ignacio Carrasco (Spain) Jairo Velasco	7–6, 4–6, 6–7
Loss	6–5	Jun 2000	Braunschweig, Germany	Challenger	Clay	(Spain) Álex López Morón	(Germany) Jens Knippschild (United States) Jeff Tarango	2–6, 2–6
Win	7–5	Oct 2000	Barcelona, Spain	Challenger	Clay	(Spain) Tomás Carbonell	(Germany) Marcus Hilpert (Germany) Jens Knippschild	5–7, 6–1, 6–4
Win	8–5	Oct 2000	Cairo, Egypt	Challenger	Clay	(Spain) Álex López Morón	(Czech Republic) Petr Kovačka (Czech Republic) Pavel Kudrnáč	6–4, 6–3
Loss	8–6	Oct 2002	Seville, Spain	Challenger	Clay	(Spain) Álex López Morón	(Argentina) Mariano Hood (Peru) Luis Horna	6–4, 1–6, 4–6
Loss	8–7	Oct 2002	Cairo, Egypt	Challenger	Clay	(Spain) Álex López Morón	(Czech Republic) Tomas Behrend (Germany) Karsten Braasch	6–7^{(3–7)}, 4–6
Loss	8–8	Mar 2003	Cagliari, Italy	Challenger	Clay	(Spain) Juan Ignacio Carrasco	(Spain) Álex López Morón (Argentina) Andrés Schneiter	7–5, 4–6, 5–7
Loss	8–9	Jul 2003	Córdoba, Spain	Challenger	Hard	(Spain) Juan Ignacio Carrasco	(United States) Brandon Coupe (Israel) Noam Okun	4–6, 6–1, 4–6
Win	9–9	Oct 2003	Seville, Spain	Challenger	Clay	(Spain) Óscar Hernández	(Italy) Enzo Artoni (Argentina) Sergio Roitman	6–4, 4–6, 6–4
Win	10–9	Sep 2004	Kyiv, Ukraine	Challenger	Clay	(Argentina) Sergio Roitman	(Russia) Igor Kunitsyn (Russia) Yuri Schukin	6–1, 6–1
Win	11–9	May 2005	Ettlingen, Germany	Challenger	Clay	(Spain) Marc López	(Belgium) Jeroen Masson (Spain) Gabriel Trujillo Soler	3–6, 6–1, 7–5
Loss	11–10	Jun 2005	Barcelona, Spain	Challenger	Clay	(Spain) Álex López Morón	(Spain) Óscar Hernández (Spain) Gabriel Trujillo Soler	5–7, 4–6
Win	12–10	Mar 2007	Barletta, Italy	Challenger	Clay	(Spain) David Marrero	(Italy) Alessandro Motti (Italy) Flavio Cipolla	6–4, 6–4

== Wins over top 10 players ==
Season	1997	1998	1999	2000	2001	2002	2003	Total
Wins	3	0	0	1	4	0	2	10

#	Player	Rank	Event	Surface	Rd	Score
1997
1.	(Chile) Marcelo Ríos	9	Barcelona, Spain	Clay	2R	7–5, 7–6^{(7–3)}
2.	(Spain) Carlos Moyá	9	French Open, Paris, France	Clay	2R	6–4, 4–6, 7–5, 6–3
3.	(Austria) Thomas Muster	4	Stuttgart, Germany	Clay	2R	6–4, 7–5
2000
4.	(Brazil) Gustavo Kuerten	5	Australian Open, Melbourne, Australia	Hard	1R	4–6, 4–6, 6–4, 7–6^{(8–6)}, 6–4
2001
5.	(Sweden) Magnus Norman	5	Barcelona, Spain	Clay	2R	1–1, ret.
6.	(Sweden) Magnus Norman	6	Hamburg, Germany	Clay	2R	7–6^{(7–5)}, 7–6^{(9–7)}
7.	(Australia) Lleyton Hewitt	7	Hamburg, Germany	Clay	SF	3–6, 7–5, 6–2
8.	(Spain) Juan Carlos Ferrero	9	Hamburg, Germany	Clay	F	3–6, 6–2, 0–6, 7–6^{(7–5)}, 7–5
2003
9.	(United States) Andy Roddick	6	Monte Carlo, Monaco	Clay	1R	7–6^{(7–5)}, 6–3
10.	(Spain) Carlos Moyá	4	Sopot, Poland	Clay	1R	7–6^{(7–4)}, 6–7^{(6–8)}, 6–4
