= Álex López Morón =

Spanish tennis player (born 1970)

- Country (sports): Spain
- Born: 28 November 1970 (age 55) Barcelona, Spain
- Height: 1.75 m (5 ft 9 in)
- Turned pro: 1990
- Retired: 2010 (last match played)
- Plays: Right-handed (two-handed backhand)
- Coach: Víctor López Morón
- Prize money: $833,225

Singles
- Career record: 18–36
- Career titles: 0
- Highest ranking: No. 100 (9 October 1995)

Grand Slam singles results
- Australian Open: 1R (2000)
- French Open: 2R (1999)
- Wimbledon: 1R (1995)
- US Open: 1R (1995)

Doubles
- Career record: 57–101
- Career titles: 2
- Highest ranking: No. 63 (24 July 2000)

Grand Slam doubles results
- Australian Open: 2R (2000, 2001, 2002)
- French Open: 1R (1999, 2000, 2001, 2002, 2003, 2004, 2005)
- Wimbledon: 2R (2004)
- US Open: 2R (2003)

Grand Slam mixed doubles results
- Wimbledon: 2R (2003, 2005)
- Last updated on: 1 March 2026.

Álex López Morón (Note: In this Spanish name, the first or paternal surname is López and the second or maternal family name is Morón.) (born 28 November 1970) is a retired professional male tennis player from Spain. His career-high ATP singles ranking is world No. 100 achieved on 9 October 1995 and his best doubles ranking is No. 63 reached on 24 July 2000.

== Personal life ==
His brother Víctor López Morón played tennis professionally and was also his tennis coach.

== ATP career finals ==
=== Doubles: 2 (2 titles) ===
Legend Grand Slam tournaments (0–0) ATP World Tour Finals (0–0) ATP Masters Series (0–0) ATP Championship Series (0–0) ATP International Series (2–0)	Finals by surface Hard (0–0) Clay (2–0) Grass (0–0)	Titles by setting Outdoor (2–0) Indoor (0–0)

Result	W–L	Date	Tournament	Tier	Surface	Partner	Opponents	Score
Win	1–0	Jul 2000	Umag, Croatia	International Series	Clay	(Spain) Albert Portas	(Croatia) Ivan Ljubičić (Croatia) Lovro Zovko	6–1, 7–6^{(7–2)}
Win	2–0	Jul 2003	Umag, Croatia	International Series	Clay	(Spain) Rafael Nadal	(Australia) Todd Perry (Japan) Thomas Shimada	6–1, 6–3

== ATP Challenger and ITF Futures finals ==
=== Singles: 4 (2–2) ===
Legend ATP Challenger (2–2) ITF Futures (0–0)	Finals by surface Hard (0–0) Clay (2–2) Grass (0–0) Carpet (0–0)

Result	W–L	Date	Tournament	Tier	Surface	Opponent	Score
Loss	0–1	Sep 1997	Seville, Spain	Challenger	Clay	(Spain) Álex Calatrava	2–6, 4–6
Win	1–1	Oct 1997	Mallorca, Spain	Challenger	Clay	(Bulgaria) Orlin Stanoytchev	6–4, 6–4
Win	2–1	Jul 1999	Montauban, France	Challenger	Clay	(Portugal) Emanuel Couto	6–4, 4–6, 6–2
Loss	2–2	Jul 1999	Ostend, Belgium	Challenger	Clay	(France) Olivier Malcor	3–6, 1–6

=== Doubles: 33 (16–17) ===
Legend ATP Challenger (16–17) ITF Futures (0–0)	Finals by surface Hard (1–0) Clay (15–17) Grass (0–0) Carpet (0–0)

Result	W–L	Date	Tournament	Tier	Surface	Partner	Opponents	Score
Loss	0–1	Jul 1994	Oberstaufen, Germany	Challenger	Clay	(Italy) Massimo Valeri	(Australia) Joshua Eagle (South Africa) Kirk Haygarth	3–6, 2–6
Loss	0–2	Aug 1997	Alpirsbach, Germany	Challenger	Clay	(Italy) Fabio Maggi	(Germany) Mathias Huning (Australia) Grant Silcock	7–5, 4–6, 5–7
Win	1–2	Sep 1997	Espinho, Portugal	Challenger	Clay	(Spain) Juan Ignacio Carrasco	(Spain) Álex Calatrava (Portugal) Bernardo Mota	4–6, 6–2, 7–5
Win	2–2	Jun 1998	Furth, Germany	Challenger	Clay	(Spain) Albert Portas	(Spain) Juan Ignacio Carrasco (Argentina) Martín Rodríguez	6–4, 6–4
Loss	2–3	Jun 1998	Split, Croatia	Challenger	Clay	(Spain) Alberto Martín	(United States) Geoff Grant (Hungary) Attila Sávolt	6–4, 3–6, 2–6
Loss	2–4	Jul 1998	Contrexéville, France	Challenger	Clay	(Spain) Jairo Velasco	(Argentina) Diego del Río (Argentina) Martín Rodríguez	6–7, 6–4, 4–6
Loss	2–5	Sep 1998	Szczecin, Poland	Challenger	Clay	(Italy) Massimo Ardinghi	(Bulgaria) Orlin Stanoytchev (Czech Republic) Radomír Vašek	6–7, 6–3, 4–6
Win	3–5	Oct 1998	Cairo, Egypt	Challenger	Clay	(Spain) Albert Portas	(Spain) Alberto Martín (Spain) Salvador Navarro	4–6, 6–3, 6–2
Win	4–5	Aug 1999	Geneva, Switzerland	Challenger	Clay	(Spain) Emilio Benfele Álvarez	(Australia) Paul Hanley (Australia) Nathan Healey	7–5, 6–3
Loss	4–6	Oct 1999	Cairo, Egypt	Challenger	Clay	(Spain) Albert Portas	(Spain) Jairo Velasco (Spain) Juan Ignacio Carrasco	7–6, 4–6, 6–7
Loss	4–7	Nov 1999	Santiago, Chile	Challenger	Clay	(Spain) Germán Puentes Alcañiz	(Brazil) Antonio Prieto (Brazil) Cristiano Testa	6–4, 4–6, 3–6
Win	5–7	May 2000	Ljubljana, Slovenia	Challenger	Clay	(Spain) Emilio Benfele Álvarez	(South Africa) Paul Rosner (South Africa) Jason Weir-Smith	6–3, 6–4
Loss	5–8	Jun 2000	Braunschweig, Germany	Challenger	Clay	(Spain) Albert Portas	(Germany) Jens Knippschild (United States) Jeff Tarango	2–6, 2–6
Win	6–8	Oct 2000	Cairo, Egypt	Challenger	Clay	(Spain) Albert Portas	(Czech Republic) Petr Kovačka (Czech Republic) Pavel Kudrnáč	6–4, 6–3
Loss	6–9	Sep 2001	Szczecin, Poland	Challenger	Clay	(Spain) Juan Ignacio Carrasco	(Poland) Mariusz Fyrstenberg (Poland) Marcin Matkowski	4–6, 6–7^{(2–7)}
Win	7–9	Oct 2001	Cagliari, Italy	Challenger	Clay	(Spain) Juan Ignacio Carrasco	(Spain) Marc López (Spain) Fernando Vicente	6–2, 4–6, 6–4
Win	8–9	Oct 2001	Barcelona, Spain	Challenger	Clay	(Spain) Juan Ignacio Carrasco	(Czech Republic) František Čermák (Czech Republic) David Škoch	6–4, 6–1
Win	9–9	Apr 2002	Tunis, Tunisia	Challenger	Clay	(Argentina) Andrés Schneiter	(United States) Devin Bowen (Australia) Ashley Fisher	6–4, 7–6^{(8–6)}
Loss	9–10	Oct 2002	Seville, Spain	Challenger	Clay	(Spain) Albert Portas	(Argentina) Mariano Hood (Peru) Luis Horna	6–4, 1–6, 4–6
Loss	9–11	Oct 2002	Cairo, Egypt	Challenger	Clay	(Spain) Albert Portas	(Germany) Karsten Braasch (Germany) Tomas Behrend	6–7^{(3–7)}, 4–6
Win	10–11	Mar 2003	Cagliari, Italy	Challenger	Clay	(Argentina) Andrés Schneiter	(Spain) Juan Ignacio Carrasco (Spain) Albert Portas	5–7, 6–4, 7–5
Loss	10–12	May 2003	Košice, Slovakia	Challenger	Clay	(Argentina) Andrés Schneiter	(Australia) Stephen Huss (South Africa) Myles Wakefield	4–6, 3–6
Loss	10–13	Jun 2003	Lugano, Switzerland	Challenger	Clay	(Argentina) Andrés Schneiter	(Spain) Joan Balcells (Spain) Juan Albert Viloca	4–6, 4–6
Win	11–13	Aug 2003	Geneva, Switzerland	Challenger	Clay	(Argentina) Andrés Schneiter	(Spain) Emilio Benfele Álvarez (Germany) Philipp Petzschner	6–4, 5–7, 7–6^{(9–7)}
Win	12–13	Jul 2004	Montauban, France	Challenger	Clay	(Germany) Marc-Kevin Goellner	(Argentina) Brian Dabul (Argentina) Ignacio Gonzalez-King	6–3, 5–7, 7–6^{(7–5)}
Loss	12–14	Aug 2004	San Marino, San Marino	Challenger	Clay	(Chile) Adrián García	(Italy) Massimo Bertolini (Belgium) Tom Vanhoudt	2–6, 4–6
Win	13–14	Aug 2004	Trani, Italy	Challenger	Clay	(Italy) Massimo Bertolini	(Czech Republic) Martin Štěpánek (Czech Republic) Jan Vacek	2–6, 6–4, 6–3
Win	14–14	Sep 2004	Genoa, Italy	Challenger	Clay	(Spain) Emilio Benfele Álvarez	(Italy) Massimo Bertolini (Belgium) Tom Vanhoudt	6–3, 6–4
Loss	14–15	Oct 2004	Seville, Spain	Challenger	Clay	(Spain) Óscar Hernández	(Germany) Alexander Waske (Germany) Tomas Behrend	6–7^{(0–7)}, 6–7^{(2–7)}
Loss	14–16	Jun 2005	Barcelona, Spain	Challenger	Clay	(Spain) Albert Portas	(Spain) Óscar Hernández (Spain) Gabriel Trujillo Soler	5–7, 4–6
Win	15–16	Jun 2005	Braunschweig, Germany	Challenger	Clay	(Italy) Enzo Artoni	(Italy) Massimo Bertolini (Belgium) Tom Vanhoudt	5–7, 6–4, 7–6^{(14–12)}
Win	16–16	Aug 2005	Segovia, Spain	Challenger	Hard	(Spain) Marcel Granollers	(Italy) Daniele Bracciali (Italy) Uros Vico	6–4, 6–2
Loss	16–17	Sep 2006	Tarragona, Spain	Challenger	Clay	(Spain) Santiago Ventura	(United States) Hugo Armando (Spain) Gabriel Trujillo Soler	3–6, 6–7^{(3–7)}

== Performance timelines ==
Key
W	F	SF	QF	#R	RR	Q#	DNQ	A	NH

(W) winner; (F) finalist; (SF) semifinalist; (QF) quarterfinalist; (#R) rounds 4, 3, 2, 1; (RR) round-robin stage; (Q#) qualification round; (DNQ) did not qualify; (A) absent; (NH) not held; (SR) strike rate (events won / competed); (W–L) win–loss record.

=== Singles ===
Tournament	1993	1994	1995	1996	1997	1998	1999	2000	2001	SR	W–L	Win %
Grand Slam tournaments
Australian Open	A	A	A	A	A	Q3	Q1	1R	Q1	0 / 1	0–1	0%
French Open	A	Q3	1R	A	Q3	Q1	2R	Q1	A	0 / 2	1–2	33%
Wimbledon	Q1	Q2	1R	A	Q1	A	A	A	A	0 / 1	0–1	0%
US Open	A	A	1R	A	A	A	A	Q2	A	0 / 1	0–1	0%
Win–loss	0–0	0–0	0–3	0–0	0–0	0–0	1–1	0–1	0–0	0 / 5	1–5	17%
ATP Tour Masters 1000
Monte Carlo	Q1	Q3	3R	A	A	A	A	1R	A	0 / 2	2–2	50%
Hamburg	A	A	A	A	A	A	Q1	A	A	0 / 0	0–0	–
Rome Masters	A	Q1	A	A	A	A	A	A	A	0 / 0	0–0	–
Win–loss	0–0	0–0	2–1	0–0	0–0	0–0	0–0	0–1	0–0	0 / 2	2–2	50%

=== Doubles ===
Tournament	1999	2000	2001	2002	2003	2004	2005	SR	W–L	Win %
Grand Slam tournaments
Australian Open	1R	2R	2R	2R	1R	1R	A	0 / 6	3–6	33%
French Open	1R	1R	1R	1R	1R	1R	1R	0 / 7	0–7	0%
Wimbledon	1R	1R	1R	A	1R	2R	1R	0 / 6	1–6	14%
US Open	A	1R	A	1R	2R	1R	A	0 / 4	1–4	20%
Win–loss	0–3	1–4	1–3	1–3	1–4	1–4	0–2	0 / 23	5–23	18%
ATP Tour Masters 1000
Miami Open	A	A	1R	A	A	A	A	0 / 1	0–1	0%
Monte Carlo	A	A	1R	A	A	A	A	0 / 1	0–1	0%
Hamburg	QF	A	A	A	A	A	A	0 / 1	2–1	67%
Win–loss	2–1	0–0	0–2	0–0	0–0	0–0	0–0	0 / 3	2–3	40%

== Wins over top 10 players ==
#	Player	Rank	Event	Surface	Rd	Score
1995
1.	(Sweden) Magnus Larsson	10	Monte Carlo, Monaco	Clay	2R	6–3, 7–6^{(7–3)}
