= Nicolas Coutelot =

French tennis player

- Country (sports): France
- Residence: Garches, France
- Born: 9 February 1977 (age 48); Strasbourg, France
- Height: 1.85 m (6 ft 1 in)
- Turned pro: 1996
- Retired: 2009
- Plays: Right-handed (two-handed backhand)
- Prize money: $390,290

Singles
- Career record: 13–19
- Career titles: 0
- Highest ranking: No. 87 (13 May 2002)

Grand Slam singles results
- Australian Open: Q3 (2002)
- French Open: 3R (2001, 2003)
- Wimbledon: 1R (2002)
- US Open: 1R (2002)

Doubles
- Career record: 1–3
- Career titles: 0
- Highest ranking: No. 306 (10 July 2000)

Grand Slam doubles results
- French Open: 1R (2002)
- Last updated on: 13 December 2022.

Nicolas Coutelot (French: [nikɔla kut(ə)lo]; born 9 February 1977) is a retired professional male tennis player from France who reached a career-high singles ranking of World No. 87 in May 2002. He also failed a drugs test in 2004 and was suspended for two months (cannabis).

== 1996–2004 ==
At the 2001 French Open Coutelot caused a major upset when he knocked out former World No. 1 Marcelo Ríos in straight sets in the second round. But he lost a five set battle to Wayne Arthurs in the next round. In 2002 at the French Open Coutelot caused controversy when he claimed that Juan Carlos Ferrero had feigned injury, after he lost their second round encounter in the final set. However, Ferrero really was injured as he took a tumble whilst practicing against Tommy Robredo. At the US Open Coutelot made his best appearance by reaching the first round before losing in straight sets to defending champion and World No. 1 Lleyton Hewitt.

Coutelot again reached the third round of the French Open when he bundled out David Nalbandian in five sets, despite being two sets to love up, before winning the final set.

His career-high singles ranking was World No. 87.

== Drugs suspension ==
Coutelot was suspended for two months in 2004 after he tested positive for cannabis when attempting to qualify for the Movistar Open.

== ATP Challenger and ITF Futures finals ==
=== Singles: 19 (12–7) ===
| Legend ATP Challenger (3–3) ITF Futures (9–4) | Finals by surface Hard (0–0) Clay (12–7) Grass (0–0) Carpet (0–0) |

| Result | W–L | Date | Tournament | Tier | Surface | Opponent | Score |
|---|---|---|---|---|---|---|---|
| Loss | 0–1 | Jan 2000 | France F1, Grasse | Futures | Clay | (Belgium) Filip Dewulf | 2–6, 2–6 |
| Loss | 0–2 | Jan 2000 | France F2, Angers | Futures | Clay | (Hungary) Norbert Mazany | 4–6, 6–7^{(9–11)} |
| Loss | 0–3 | Jan 2000 | France F3, Feucherolles | Futures | Clay | (France) Charles Auffray | 4–6, 4–6 |
| Win | 1–3 | Jul 2000 | Scheveningen, Netherlands | Challenger | Clay | (Argentina) Martín Rodríguez | 6–3, ret. |
| Win | 2–3 | Sep 2000 | Aschaffenburg, Germany | Challenger | Clay | (Peru) Luis Horna | 6–7^{(2–7)}, 6–3, 6–1 |
| Loss | 2–4 | Jul 2001 | Venice, Italy | Challenger | Clay | (Belgium) Christophe Rochus | 7–6^{(7–5)}, 5–7, 4–6 |
| Loss | 2–5 | Sep 2001 | Szczecin, Poland | Challenger | Clay | (Argentina) Juan Ignacio Chela | 1–6, 3–6 |
| Loss | 2–6 | Oct 2001 | Barcelona, Spain | Challenger | Clay | (Greece) Konstantinos Economidis | 6–7^{(4–7)}, 1–6 |
| Win | 3–6 | May 2004 | Rome, Italy | Challenger | Clay | (Spain) Guillermo García López | 5–7, 7–5, 6–2 |
| Loss | 3–7 | Feb 2006 | Spain F7, Cartagena | Futures | Clay | (Spain) Pablo Santos González | 0–6, 1–6 |
| Win | 4–7 | Apr 2006 | France F6, Grasse | Futures | Clay | (France) Arnaud Di Pasquale | 6–2, 6–2 |
| Win | 5–7 | Aug 2007 | Lithuania F1, Vilnius | Futures | Clay | (Lithuania) Gvidas Sabeckis | 6–4, 6–3 |
| Win | 6–7 | Aug 2007 | Lithuania F2, Vilnius | Futures | Clay | (Finland) Juho Paukku | 6–2, 6–1 |
| Win | 7–7 | Feb 2008 | Spain F5, Murcia | Futures | Clay | (Spain) Miguel Ángel López Jaén | 6–4, 6–2 |
| Win | 8–7 | Feb 2008 | Spain F6, Torre-Pacheco | Futures | Clay | (Poland) Adam Chadaj | 6–3, 6–2 |
| Win | 9–7 | Apr 2008 | France F7, Grasse | Futures | Clay | (Argentina) Diego Veronelli | 6–3, 3–6, 6–3 |
| Win | 10–7 | Jun 2008 | France F8, Blois | Futures | Clay | (France) Nicolas Renavand | 7–6^{(7–5)}, 6–3 |
| Win | 11–7 | Jun 2008 | France F9, Toulon | Futures | Clay | (France) Stéphane Robert | 6–4, 6–4 |
| Win | 12–7 | Jul 2008 | France F10, Montauban | Futures | Clay | (France) Nicolas Renavand | 6–3, 6–2 |

=== Doubles: 3 (1–2) ===
| Legend ATP Challenger (0–0) ITF Futures (1–2) | Finals by surface Hard (0–0) Clay (1–2) Grass (0–0) Carpet (0–0) |

| Result | W–L | Date | Tournament | Tier | Surface | Partner | Opponents | Score |
|---|---|---|---|---|---|---|---|---|
| Win | 1–0 | Aug 1998 | Belgium F1, Louvain-la-Neuve | Futures | Clay | (France) Johann Potron | (Belgium) Christophe Rochus (Belgium) Olivier Rochus | 6–3, 2–6, 6–2 |
| Loss | 1–1 | Jan 2000 | France F1, Grasse | Futures | Clay | (Belgium) Arnaud Fontaine | (Spain) Juan Gisbert-Schultze (Spain) Marcos Roy-Girardi | 4–6, 4–6 |
| Loss | 1–2 | Jan 2000 | France F3, Feucherolles | Futures | Clay | (Argentina) Leonardo Olguín | (Belgium) Olivier Rochus (Belgium) Réginald Willems | 1–6, 2–6 |

== Performance Timeline ==
Key
| W | F | SF | QF | #R | RR | Q# | P# | DNQ | A | Z# | PO | G | S | B | NMS | NTI | P | NH |

(W) winner; (F) finalist; (SF) semifinalist; (QF) quarterfinalist; (#R) rounds 4, 3, 2, 1; (RR) round-robin stage; (Q#) qualification round; (P#) preliminary round; (DNQ) did not qualify; (A) absent; (Z#) Davis/Fed Cup Zonal Group (with number indication) or (PO) play-off; (G) gold, (S) silver or (B) bronze Olympic/Paralympic medal; (NMS) not a Masters tournament; (NTI) not a Tier I tournament; (P) postponed; (NH) not held; (SR) strike rate (events won / competed); (W–L) win–loss record.

=== Singles ===
| Tournament | 1998 | 1999 | 2000 | 2001 | 2002 | 2003 | 2004 | 2005 | 2006 | 2007 | 2008 | SR | W–L | Win% |
|---|---|---|---|---|---|---|---|---|---|---|---|---|---|---|
Grand Slam tournaments
| Australian Open | A | A | A | Q1 | Q3 | Q1 | Q2 | A | A | A | A | 0 / 0 | 0–0 | – |
| French Open | Q2 | A | Q1 | 3R | 2R | 3R | Q1 | A | A | A | A | 0 / 3 | 5–3 | 63% |
| Wimbledon | A | A | Q1 | Q1 | 1R | A | Q1 | A | A | A | A | 0 / 1 | 0–1 | 0% |
| US Open | A | A | Q2 | Q1 | 1R | A | A | A | A | A | Q2 | 0 / 1 | 0–1 | 0% |
| Win–loss | 0–0 | 0–0 | 0–0 | 2–1 | 1–3 | 2–1 | 0–0 | 0–0 | 0–0 | 0–0 | 0–0 | 0 / 5 | 5–5 | 50% |
ATP Tour Masters 1000
| Miami | A | A | A | Q1 | A | A | A | A | A | A | A | 0 / 0 | 0–0 | – |
| Monte Carlo | A | A | A | A | 2R | Q2 | A | A | A | A | A | 0 / 1 | 1–1 | 50% |
| Rome | A | A | A | A | Q2 | A | A | A | A | A | A | 0 / 0 | 0–0 | – |
| Cincinnati | A | A | Q2 | A | A | A | A | A | A | A | A | 0 / 0 | 0–0 | – |
| Win–loss | 0–0 | 0–0 | 0–0 | 0–0 | 1–1 | 0–0 | 0–0 | 0–0 | 0–0 | 0–0 | 0–0 | 0 / 1 | 1–1 | 50% |
