= Željko Krajan =

Croatian tennis player and coach (born 1979)

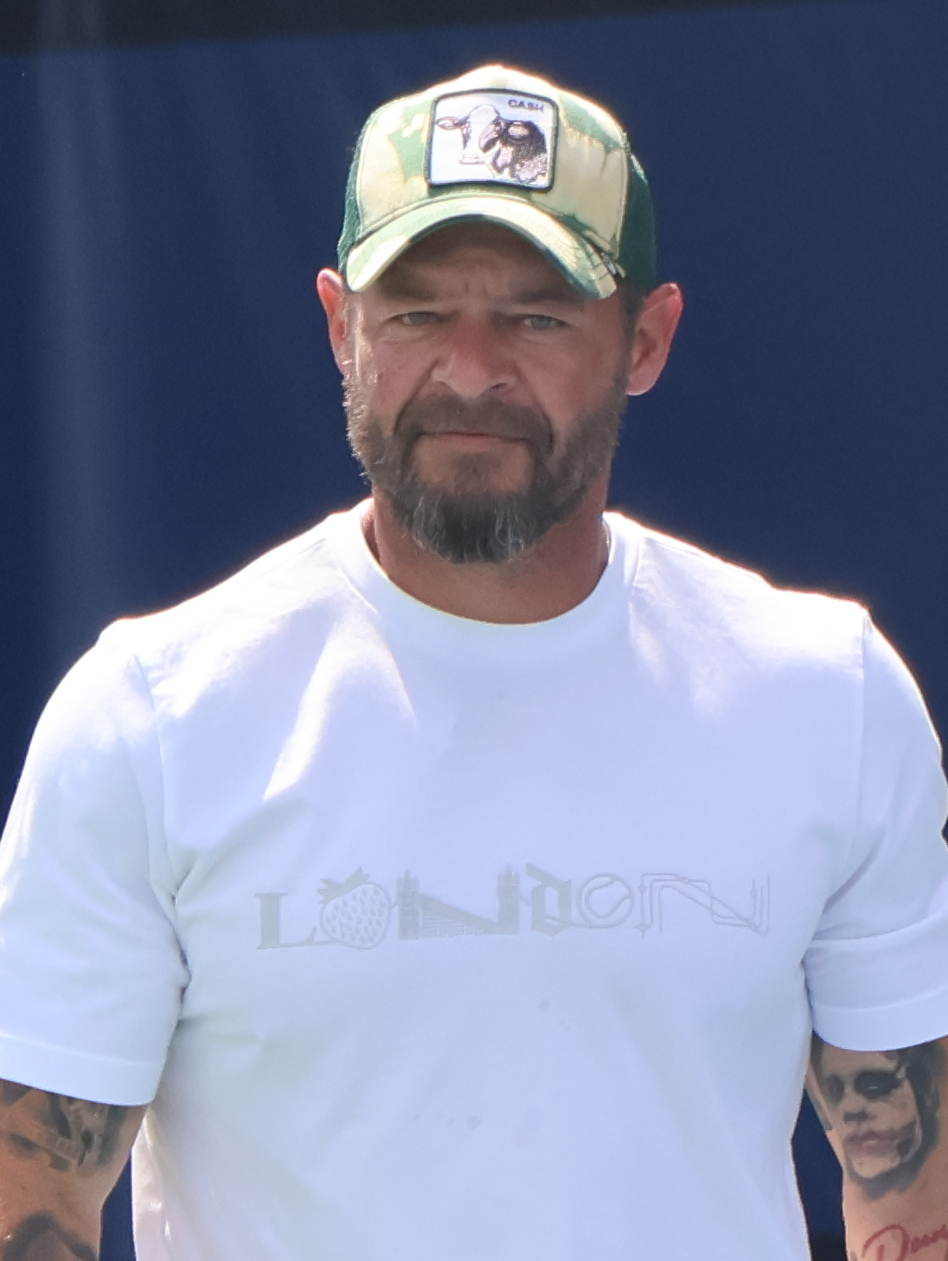
- Krajan in 2024
- Country (sports): Croatia
- Residence: Varaždin, Croatia
- Born: 3 February 1979 (age 47) Varaždin, SR Croatia, SFR Yugoslavia
- Height: 5 ft 10 in (178 cm)
- Turned pro: 1997
- Plays: Right-handed
- Prize money: $284,128

Singles
- Career record: 9–28 (at ATP Tour level, Grand Slam level, and in Davis Cup)
- Career titles: 0
- Highest ranking: No. 88 (19 August 2002)

Grand Slam singles results
- Australian Open: 1R (2003)
- French Open: 1R (2003)
- Wimbledon: 1R (2003)
- US Open: Q2 (2002)

Doubles
- Career record: 0–2 (at ATP Tour level, Grand Slam level, and in Davis Cup)
- Career titles: 0
- Highest ranking: No. 371 (0 November 1998)

Željko Krajan (Croatian pronunciation: [ʒêːʎko ˈkrajan];; born 3 February 1979) is a Croatian tennis coach and former professional player.

== Playing career ==
Krajan, a native of Varaždin, began playing tennis at age six. His greatest success as a junior player was winning the Orange Bowl doubles tournament with Ivan Ljubičić in 1995.

Krajan started his pro career at the ATP Tour in 1997. His highest ATP ranking was No. 88 in August 2002. In 2003 Krajan was sidelined following a shoulder surgery. In 2004 he suffered a serious quadriceps tear, which ultimately caused his retirement from professional tennis in 2005.

== Coaching career ==
From 2005 on, Krajan turned to coaching, at first working with Saša Tuksar, a young Croatian tennis player, and then with German junior players as Heinz Günthardt's assistant coach. In 2006 and 2007 he played in the German Regionalliga Süd-Ost for TC Ismaning. In October 2007, upon recommendation by Ivan Ljubičić, he became the coach of Dinara Safina, who was at the time at a psychological low point of her career, ranked No. 17 in the world, and close to retiring from tennis. Under Krajan's lead, Safina scored good results in the early 2008 season and placed runner-up in the 2008 French Open. After the 2008 French Open, Krajan was joined by Dejan Vojnović, retired Croatian Olympic sprinter, who became Safina's fitness coach. Her continued string of good results earned her the 2008 WTA Most Improved Player award, and the World No. 1 spot in April 2009. Safina described Krajan as "totally different from any other tennis coach" due to his patience and positive approach, as opposed to being preoccupied with correcting flaws in one's game.

Safina and Krajan parted ways in May 2010. In June of the same year Krajan started coaching Dominika Cibulková. Krajan ceased working with Cibulkova in April 2012. In January 2012 Krajan took over coaching of the Croatian Davis Cup team. From April to June 2012 Krajan worked with Jelena Janković on trial basis. In August 2012 Krajan began coaching Laura Robson, until they parted ways in May 2013, before the Mutua Madrid Open.

Since May 2013, he returned to work in the ATP, coaching Former World No. 8 and Australian Open finalist Marcos Baghdatis.

In November 2014, Borna Ćorić decided to take Krajan as his new coach.

In April 2015, he left Ćorić and has quit being his coach to spend more time with his family.

On 25 November 2018, he won the Davis Cup with the national team.

On 9 November 2019, just nine days before the Davis Cup, he parted ways with the national team.

In February 2024, Krajan started coaching former world number 1, Karolína Plíšková.

== ATP Challenger and ITF Futures finals ==
=== Singles: 9 (6–3) ===
Legend ATP Challenger (1–2) ITF Futures (5–1)	Finals by surface Hard (1–0) Clay (5–3) Grass (0–0) Carpet (0–0)

Result	W–L	Date	Tournament	Tier	Surface	Opponent	Score
Loss	0–1	Aug 2001	Geneva Open Challenger, Switzerland	Challenger	Clay	(Netherlands) Dennis Van Scheppingen	3–6, 2–6
Win	1–1	Sep 2001	Kamnik] Challenger, Slovenia	Challenger	Clay	(Greece) Vasilis Mazarakis	6–2, 3–6, 7–6^{(9–7)}
Loss	1–2	Jun 2002	Weiden in der Oberpfalz, Germany	Challenger	Clay	(Peru) Luis Horna	0–6, 4–6

Result	W–L	Date	Tournament	Tier	Surface	Opponent	Score
Win	1–0	Aug 1998	F4 Ljubljana, Slovenia	Futures	Clay	(Czech Republic) Jan Vacek	6–3, 6–3
Win	2–0	Aug 1998	F6 Umag, Croatia	Futures	Clay	(Croatia) Ivo Karlović	6–3, 3–6, 6–3
Win	3–0	May 1999	F4 Villingen, Germany	Futures	Clay	(Sweden) Johan Settergren	6–4, 6–1
Win	4–0	Jun 1999	F4B Riemerling, Germany	Futures	Clay	(Australia) James Sekulov	6–4, 4–6, 6–0
Win	5–0	Jan 2005	F2 Stuttgart, Germany	Futures	Hard	(Germany) Benjamin Ebrahimzadeh	6–3, 6–4
Loss	5–1	Sep 2005	F14 Kempten, Germany	Futures	Clay	(Republic of Ireland) Louk Sorensen	6–4, 3–6, 5–7

=== Doubles: 4 (2–2) ===
Legend ATP Challenger (0–0) ITF Futures (2–2)	Finals by surface Hard (1–1) Clay (1–1) Grass (0–0) Carpet (0–0)

Result	W–L	Date	Tournament	Tier	Surface	Partner	Opponents	Score
Win	1–0	Jun 1998	F1 Veli Lošinj, Croatia	Futures	Clay	(Croatia) Saša Hiršzon	(Croatia) Ivo Karlović (Croatia) Igor Saric	7–6, 6–3
Loss	1–1	Feb 2000	F1 Zagreb, Croatia	Futures	Hard	(Croatia) Roko Karanušić	(Croatia) Ivica Ančić (Croatia) Mario Ančić	4–6, 7–5, 5–7
Loss	1–2	May 2000	F3 Teurershof, Germany	Futures	Clay	(Croatia) Lovro Zovko	(Netherlands) Bobbie Altelaar (Germany) Jan Weinzierl	4–6, 5–7
Win	2–2	Feb 2001	F5 Bressuire, France	Futures	Hard	(Croatia) Ivan Cinkus	(Italy) Alessandro Motti (Italy) Andrea Stoppini	6–4, 6–1
