= Juan Ignacio Carrasco =

Spanish tennis player (born 1974)

Juan Ignacio Carrasco Carrasco
- Country (sports): Spain
- Residence: Cabrils, Spain
- Born: 9 July 1974 (age 50); Barcelona, Spain
- Height: 6 ft 1 in (185 cm)
- Turned pro: 1993
- Plays: Left-handed
- Prize money: $261,327

Doubles
- Career record: 39–64
- Career titles: 0
- Highest ranking: No. 59 (24 July 2000)

Grand Slam doubles results
- Australian Open: 2R (2002)
- French Open: 3R (2000)
- Wimbledon: 1R (1999–2004)
- US Open: 2R (2000)

Juan Ignacio Carrasco (born 9 July 1974) is a former professional tennis player from Spain.

== Career ==
Carrasco, a doubles specialist, appeared in 17 Grand Slams during his career. He competed in the men's doubles on each occasion and also played mixed doubles once, at the 2000 Wimbledon Championships with Gisela Riera as his partner. Carrasco and Riera made the third round, which was also the furthest he ever reached in the men's doubles, at the 2000 French Open with Jairo Velasco Jr. En route, the pair defeated ninth seeds Mahesh Bhupathi and David Prinosil.

It was with Velasco that he made his only ATP Tour final, which was at Marseille in 2000. They also reached semi-finals in Mallorca and Bogota in 1999 and 2000. His other best results were semi-final appearances with Alex Lopez Moron at both Stuttgart and Bucharest in 2002. He also made the semi-finals of the 2003 Dutch Open, partnering Johan Landsberg.

He only played singles tennis on the Challenger circuit and in 1993 reached his highest ever ranking, 342 in the world.

== ATP career finals ==
=== Doubles: 1 (0–1) ===
Result	W-L	Year	Tournament	Surface	Partner	Opponents	Score
Loss	0–1	Feb 2000	Marseille, France	Hard	(Spain) Jairo Velasco Jr.	(Sweden) Simon Aspelin (Sweden) Johan Landsberg	6–7^{(2–7)}, 4–6

== Challenger titles ==
=== Doubles: (14) ===
No.	Year	Tournament	Surface	Partner	Opponents	Score
1.	1993	Segovia, Spain	Hard	(United Kingdom) Mark Petchey	(The Bahamas) Roger Smith (Venezuela) Maurice Ruah	6–2, 7–5
2.	1997	Oberstaufen, Germany	Clay	(Spain) Jordi Mas	(Austria) Georg Blumauer (Italy) Andrea Gaudenzi	6–2, 7–6
3.	1997	Espinho, Portugal	Clay	(Spain) Álex López Morón	(Spain) Álex Calatrava (Portugal) Bernardo Mota	4–6, 6–2, 7–5
4.	1998	Barletta, Italy	Clay	(Spain) Juan Balcells	(Austria) Thomas Strengberger (Federal Republic of Yugoslavia) Dušan Vemić	7–6, 6–3
5.	1998	Brasov, Romania	Clay	(Spain) Jairo Velasco Jr.	(Czech Republic) Tomáš Cibulec (Czech Republic) Leoš Friedl	6–4, 3–6, 6–2
6.	1998	Maia, Portugal	Clay	(Spain) Jairo Velasco Jr.	(Italy) Cristian Brandi (Netherlands) Stephen Noteboom	7–5, 6–4
7.	1999	Ho Chi Minh City, Vietnam	Hard	(Spain) Jairo Velasco Jr.	(South Africa) Justin Bower (South Africa) Jason Weir-Smith	6–4, 6–4
8.	1999	Besançon, France	Hard	(Spain) Jairo Velasco Jr.	(Argentina) Martín García (Brazil) Cristiano Testa	6–1, 7–6^{(7–4)}
9.	1999	Cairo, Egypt	Clay	(Spain) Jairo Velasco Jr.	(Spain) Álex López Morón (Spain) Albert Portas	6–7^{(6–8)}, 6–4, 7–6^{(7–5)}
10.	1999	Andorra	Hard	(Spain) Jairo Velasco Jr.	(United States) Scott Humphries (Sweden) Peter Nyborg	7–5, 7–6^{(9–7)}
11.	2001	Maia, Portugal	Clay	(Netherlands) Djalmar Sistermans	(Portugal) Emanuel Couto (Portugal) Bernardo Mota	7–5, 3–6, 7–5
12.	2001	Cagliari, Italy	Clay	(Spain) Álex López Morón	(Spain) Marc López (Spain) Fernando Vicente	6–2, 4–6, 6–4
13.	2001	Barcelona, Spain	Clay	(Spain) Álex López Morón	(Czech Republic) František Čermák (Czech Republic) David Škoch	6–4, 6–1
14.	2003	Barcelona, Spain	Clay	(Argentina) Mariano Delfino	(Italy) Enzo Artoni (Argentina) Sergio Roitman	7–5, 6–3
