= Jairo Velasco Jr. =

Spanish tennis player (born 1974)

- Country (sports): Spain
- Born: 21 January 1974 (age 51); Barcelona, Spain
- Height: 6 ft (183 cm)
- Turned pro: 1995
- Plays: Right-handed
- Prize money: $137,633

Doubles
- Career record: 26–51
- Career titles: 0
- Highest ranking: No. 59 (10 Jul 2000)

Grand Slam doubles results
- Australian Open: 1R (2000, 2001)
- French Open: 3R (2000)
- Wimbledon: 1R (1999, 2000)
- US Open: 1R (1999)

Jairo Velasco Jr. (born 21 January 1974) is a former Spanish professional tennis player. His father, Jairo Velasco Sr., was a Colombian tennis player, who emigrated to Spain.

== Career ==
Velasco was a doubles specialist, usually teaming up with countryman Juan Ignacio Carrasco. The pair appeared together in the main draw of six Grand Slams, but only once made it past the opening round. That was at the 2000 French Open, where they upset ninth seeds Mahesh Bhupathi and David Prinosil to make the third round. The pair had previously played four Grand Slam matches together without a win, although they did have the misfortune of drawing Bhupathi/Paes at the French Open and The Woodies at Wimbledon for their first two Grand Slam appearances together in 1999. They had their best ATP Tour performance at Marseille, in 2000, when they finished runners-up. The Spaniards also reached semi-finals in the 1999 Majorca Open and 2000 Colombia Open.

Before teaming up with Carrasco in 1998, Velasco made the semi-finals of the Campionati Internazionali di San Marino, with Joan Balcells, in 1996. He also played Grand Slam tennis with Virginia Ruano Pascual at the 2000 Wimbledon Championships and Mariano Hood in the 2001 Australian Open.

He played World Team Cup tennis for Spain in 1999 and 2000.

== ATP career finals ==
=== Doubles: 1 (0–1) ===
Result	W-L	Year	Tournament	Surface	Partner	Opponents	Score
Loss	0–1	Feb 2000	Marseille, France	Hard	(Spain) Juan Ignacio Carrasco	(Sweden) Simon Aspelin (Sweden) Johan Landsberg	6–7^{(2–7)}, 4–6

== Challenger titles ==
=== Doubles: (8) ===
No.	Year	Tournament	Surface	Partner	Opponents	Score
1.	1998	Brașov, Romania	Clay	(Spain) Juan Ignacio Carrasco	(Czech Republic) Tomáš Cibulec (Czech Republic) Leoš Friedl	6–4, 3–6, 6–2
2.	1998	Maia, Portugal	Clay	(Spain) Juan Ignacio Carrasco	(Italy) Cristian Brandi (Netherlands) Stephen Noteboom	7–5, 6–4
3.	1999	Ho Chi Minh City, Vietnam	Hard	(Spain) Juan Ignacio Carrasco	(South Africa) Justin Bower (South Africa) Jason Weir-Smith	6–4, 6–4
4.	1999	Besançon, France	Hard	(Spain) Juan Ignacio Carrasco	(Argentina) Martín García (Brazil) Cristiano Testa	6–1, 7–6^{(7–4)}
5.	1999	Cairo, Egypt	Clay	(Spain) Juan Ignacio Carrasco	(Spain) Álex López Morón (Spain) Albert Portas	6–7^{(6–8)}, 6–4, 7–6^{(7–5)}
6.	1999	Andorra	Hard	(Spain) Juan Ignacio Carrasco	(United States) Scott Humphries (Sweden) Peter Nyborg	7–5, 7–6^{(9–7)}
7.	2001	Barletta, Italy	Clay	(Spain) Germán Puentes	(Germany) Tomas Behrend (Russia) Mikhail Youzhny	6–1, 1–0 RET
8.	2001	Mönchengladbach, Germany	Clay	(Germany) Jens Knippschild	(Belgium) Wim Neefs (Netherlands) Djalmar Sistermans	6–3, 6–3
