= 2020 Open 13 Provence – Singles =

Singles
- 2020 Open 13 Provence

Final
- Champion: (Greece) Stefanos Tsitsipas
- Runner-up: (Canada) Félix Auger-Aliassime
- Score: 6–3, 6–4

Details
- Draw: 28 (4 Q / 3 WC )
- Seeds: 8

Events
Singles	Doubles
← 2019 ·	Open 13	· 2021 →

Stefanos Tsitsipas was the defending champion and successfully defended his title, defeating Félix Auger-Aliassime in the final, 6–3, 6–4.

== Seeds ==
The top four seeds received a bye into the second round.

1. (Russia) Daniil Medvedev (quarterfinals)
2. (Greece) Stefanos Tsitsipas (champion)
3. (Belgium) David Goffin (second round)
4. (Canada) Denis Shapovalov (quarterfinals)
5. (Russia) Karen Khachanov (first round)
6. (France) Benoît Paire (second round)
7. (Canada) Félix Auger-Aliassime (final)
8. (Poland) Hubert Hurkacz (second round)

== Draw ==
=== Key ===
- Q = Qualifier
- WC = Wild card
- LL = Lucky loser
- Alt = Alternate
- SE = Special exempt
- PR = Protected ranking
- ITF = ITF entry
- JE = Junior exempt
- w/o = Walkover
- r = Retired
- d = Defaulted
- SR = Special ranking

=== Finals ===
Semifinals
(France) Gilles Simon	5	6^{2}
7	(Canada) Félix Auger-Aliassime	7	7^{7}
(Kazakhstan) Alexander Bublik	5	3
2	(Greece) Stefanos Tsitsipas	7	6

Final
7	(Canada) Félix Auger-Aliassime	3	4
2	(Greece) Stefanos Tsitsipas	6	6

=== Top half ===
First round
Q	(Slovakia) N Gombos	4	6^{5}
(Italy) J Sinner	6	7^{7}
(France) G Simon	6	7^{7}
WC	(France) H Mayot	4	6^{3}
(Slovenia) A Bedene	4	6	7
5	(Russia) K Khachanov	6	4	5
Q	(Belarus) E Gerasimov	7^{7}	6
Q	(Austria) D Novak	6^{3}	3
(Kazakhstan) M Kukushkin	6^{4}	4
(France) P-H Herbert	7^{7}	6
(Italy) S Travaglia	7^{7}	6^{6}	3
7	(Canada) F Auger-Aliassime	6^{3}	7^{8}	6

Second round
1	(Russia) D Medvedev	1	6	6
(Italy) J Sinner	6	1	2
(France) G Simon	7^{8}	6
(Slovenia) A Bedene	6^{6}	4
3	(Belgium) D Goffin	4	6^{5}
Q	(Belarus) E Gerasimov	6	7^{7}
(France) P-H Herbert	0	7^{8}	6^{9}
7	(Canada) F Auger-Aliassime	6	6^{6}	7^{11}

Quarterfinals
1	(Russia) D Medvedev	4	0
(France) G Simon	6	6
Q	(Belarus) E Gerasimov	5	2
7	(Canada) F Auger-Aliassime	7	6

Semifinals
(France) G Simon	5	6^{2}
7	(Canada) F Auger-Aliassime	7	7^{7}

=== Bottom half ===
First round
6	(France) B Paire	6	7^{7}
WC	(France) G Barrère	4	6^{1}
(Hungary) M Fucsovics	4	5
(Kazakhstan) A Bublik	6	7
(Croatia) M Čilić	3	7^{7}	6
Q	(Belarus) I Ivashka	6	6^{5}	4
8	(Poland) H Hurkacz	6	6
WC	(France) A Hoang	4	1
PR	(Canada) V Pospisil	7^{8}	6
LL	(Finland) E Ruusuvuori	6^{6}	3
(Sweden) M Ymer	6	3	7
(France) R Gasquet	3	6	5

Second round
6	(France) B Paire	6	4	4
(Kazakhstan) A Bublik	3	6	6
(Croatia) M Čilić	4	6	2
4	(Canada) D Shapovalov	6	4	6
8	(Poland) H Hurkacz	3	4
PR	(Canada) V Pospisil	6	6
(Sweden) M Ymer	1	3
2	(Greece) S Tsitsipas	6	6

Quarterfinals
(Kazakhstan) A Bublik	7	4	6
4	(Canada) D Shapovalov	5	6	3
PR	(Canada) V Pospisil	5	3
2	(Greece) S Tsitsipas	7	6

Semifinals
(Kazakhstan) A Bublik	5	3
2	(Greece) S Tsitsipas	7	6

== Qualifying ==
=== Seeds ===
1. (Belarus) Egor Gerasimov (qualified)
2. (South Africa) Lloyd Harris (first round)
3. (Austria) Dennis Novak (qualified)
4. (Australia) Alexei Popyrin (qualifying competition)
5. (Finland) Emil Ruusuvuori (qualifying competition, lucky loser)
6. (Slovakia) Norbert Gombos (qualified)
7. (Belarus) Ilya Ivashka (qualified)
8. (Ukraine) Sergiy Stakhovsky (first round)

=== Qualifiers ===
1. (Belarus) Egor Gerasimov
2. (Slovakia) Norbert Gombos
3. (Austria) Dennis Novak
4. (Belarus) Ilya Ivashka

=== Lucky loser ===
1. (Finland) Emil Ruusuvuori

=== Qualifying draw ===
==== First qualifier ====
First round
1	(Belarus) Egor Gerasimov	6^{4}	6	6
Alt	(Russia) Evgeny Karlovskiy	7^{7}	3	1
(Slovakia) Lukáš Lacko	4	4
5	(Finland) Emil Ruusuvuori	6	6

Qualifying competition
1	(Belarus) Egor Gerasimov	4	7^{8}	7^{8}
5	(Finland) Emil Ruusuvuori	6	6^{6}	6^{6}

==== Second qualifier ====
First round
2	(South Africa) Lloyd Harris	3	4
WC	(France) Elliot Benchetrit	6	6
(Russia) Alexey Vatutin	1^{r}
6	(Slovakia) Norbert Gombos	2

Qualifying competition
WC	(France) Elliot Benchetrit	4	7^{9}	4
6	(Slovakia) Norbert Gombos	6	6^{7}	6

==== Third qualifier ====
First round
3	(Austria) Dennis Novak	6	6
WC	(France) Arthur Cazaux	1	3
Alt	(Germany) Matthias Bachinger	6	6
8	(Ukraine) Sergiy Stakhovsky	3	4

Qualifying competition
3	(Austria) Dennis Novak	7^{7}	2	6
Alt	(Germany) Matthias Bachinger	6^{4}	6	3

==== Fourth qualifier ====
First round
4	(Australia) Alexei Popyrin	7^{7}	6
(Canada) Steven Diez	6^{3}	3
(Spain) Bernabé Zapata Miralles	7^{7}	5	1
7	(Belarus) Ilya Ivashka	6^{4}	7	6

Qualifying competition
4	(Australia) Alexei Popyrin	1	6	4
7	(Belarus) Ilya Ivashka	6	3	6
