= Piatti Tennis Center =

Tennis academy in Bordighera, Italy

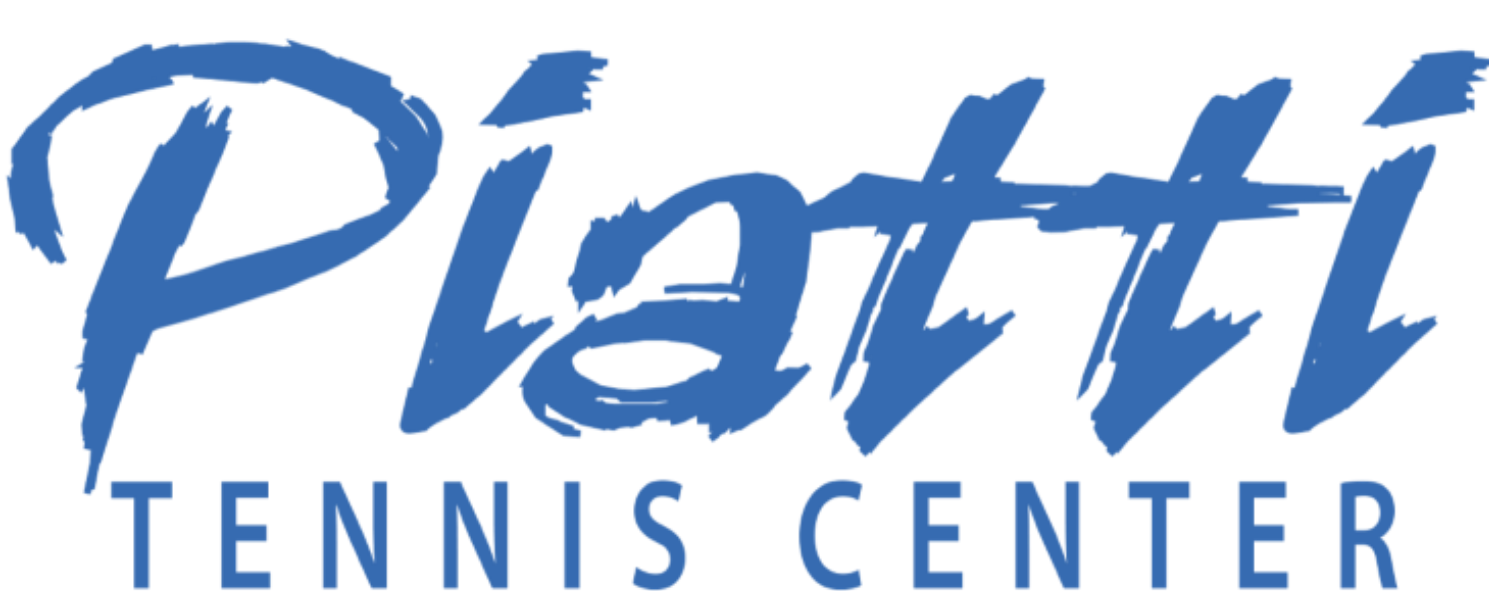
- Established: April 2018; 8 years ago
- Founder: Riccardo Piatti
- Location: Bordighera, Imperia, Italy
- Coordinates: 43.7979°N 7.6590°E
- General manager: Federico Andreani
- Website: piattitenniscenter.it

The Piatti Tennis Center is a tennis academy and training center located in Bordighera, Italy, on the Italian Riviera. It was founded in 2018 by Riccardo Piatti.

== Notable people ==
=== Players ===
- Duje Ajduković
- Ana Bogdan
- Nicolai Budkov Kjær
- Lorenzo Carboni
- Borna Ćorić
- Gabriel Debru
- Manas Dhamne
- Viktor Galović
- Tyra Caterina Grant
- Liudmila Samsonova
- Jannik Sinner

=== Coaches ===
- Cristian Brandi
- Thomas Fabbiano
- Riccardo Piatti
- Gianluigi Quinzi
- Magnus Tideman
- Luca Vanni
