= 2020 Open 13 Provence =

Men's tennis tournament in Marseille, France

Coordinates: 43.2710°N 5.4010°E

- Date: 17–23 February
- Edition: 28th
- Category: ATP 250 Series
- Draw: 28S / 16D
- Prize money: €691,880
- Surface: Hard / indoors
- Location: Marseille, France
- Venue: Palais des Sports de Marseille

Champions

Singles
- (Greece) Stefanos Tsitsipas

Doubles
- (France) Nicolas Mahut / (Canada) Vasek Pospisil
- Open 13 Provence

The 2020 Open 13 Provence was a men's tennis tournament played on indoor hard courts. It was the 28th edition of the Open 13, and part of the ATP Tour 250 series of the 2020 ATP Tour. It took place at the Palais des Sports in Marseille, France, from 17 February through 23 February 2020. Second-seeded Stefanos Tsitsipas won the singles title.

== Finals ==
=== Singles ===
- (Greece) Stefanos Tsitsipas defeated (Canada) Félix Auger-Aliassime, 6–3, 6–4

=== Doubles ===
- (France) Nicolas Mahut / (Canada) Vasek Pospisil defeated (Netherlands) Wesley Koolhof / (Croatia) Nikola Mektić, 6–3, 6–4

== Singles main-draw entrants ==
=== Seeds ===
Country	Player	Rank^{1}	Seed
RUS	Daniil Medvedev	5	1
GRE	Stefanos Tsitsipas	6	2
BEL	David Goffin	10	3
CAN	Denis Shapovalov	16	4
RUS	Karen Khachanov	17	5
FRA	Benoît Paire	19	6
CAN	Félix Auger-Aliassime	21	7
POL	Hubert Hurkacz	29	8

- Rankings are as of February 10, 2020.

=== Other entrants ===
The following players received wildcards into the main draw:

- (France) Grégoire Barrère
- (France) Antoine Hoang
- (France) Harold Mayot

The following player received entry into the singles main draw using a protected ranking:

- (Canada) Vasek Pospisil

The following players received entry from the qualifying draw:

- (Belarus) Egor Gerasimov
- (Slovakia) Norbert Gombos
- (Belarus) Ilya Ivashka
- (Austria) Dennis Novak

The following player received entry as a lucky loser

- (Finland) Emil Ruusuvuori

=== Withdrawals ===
Before the tournament

- (Spain) Pablo Carreño Busta → replaced by (Sweden) Mikael Ymer
- (France) Jérémy Chardy → replaced by (France) Pierre-Hugues Herbert
- (United Kingdom) Dan Evans → replaced by (Italy) Jannik Sinner
- (Italy) Fabio Fognini → replaced by (Kazakhstan) Mikhail Kukushkin
- (Serbia) Filip Krajinović → replaced by (Finland) Emil Ruusuvuori
- (Portugal) João Sousa → replaced by (Italy) Stefano Travaglia
- (France) Jo-Wilfried Tsonga → replaced by (France) Richard Gasquet

== Doubles main-draw entrants ==
=== Seeds ===
Country	Player	Country	Player	Rank^{1}	Seed
GER	Kevin Krawietz	GER	Andreas Mies	23	1
NED	Wesley Koolhof	CRO	Nikola Mektić	36	2
RSA	Raven Klaasen	AUT	Oliver Marach	42	3
AUT	Jürgen Melzer	FRA	Édouard Roger-Vasselin	55	4

- ^{1} Rankings are as of February 10, 2020.

=== Other entrants ===
The following pairs received wildcards into the main draw:

- (France) Arthur Cazaux / (France) Harold Mayot
- (Greece) Petros Tsitsipas / (Greece) Stefanos Tsitsipas
