= 2021 Open 13 Provence – Doubles =

Doubles
- 2021 Open 13 Provence

Final
- Champions: (United Kingdom) Lloyd Glasspool (Finland) Harri Heliövaara
- Runners-up: (Netherlands) Sander Arends (Netherlands) David Pel
- Score: 7–5, 7–6^{(7–4)}

Events
Singles	Doubles
← 2020 ·	Open 13	· 2022 →

Nicolas Mahut and Vasek Pospisil were the defending champions, but they chose not to participate.

Lloyd Glasspool and Harri Heliövaara won the title, defeating Sander Arends and David Pel in the final, 7–5, 7–6^{(7–4)}.

== Seeds ==
1. (United Kingdom) Ken Skupski / (United Kingdom) Neal Skupski (quarterfinals)
2. (United Kingdom) Luke Bambridge / (United Kingdom) Dominic Inglot (quarterfinals)
3. (United Kingdom) Jonny O'Mara / (Pakistan) Aisam-ul-Haq Qureshi (quarterfinals)
4. (India) Divij Sharan / (Slovakia) Igor Zelenay (first round)

== Draw ==
=== Key ===
- Q = Qualifier
- WC = Wild card
- LL = Lucky loser
- Alt = Alternate
- ITF = ITF entry
- PR = Protected ranking
- SR = Special ranking
- SE = Special exempt
- JE = Junior exempt
- JR = Junior Accelerator Programme entrant
- CO = College Accelerator Programme entrant
- NG = Next Gen Accelerator Program entrant
- w/o = Walkover
- r = Retired
- d = Defaulted

=== Draw ===
First round
1	(United Kingdom) K Skupski (United Kingdom) N Skupski	6	6
(United States) M McDonald (Japan) Y Nishioka	3	3
WC	(Greece) Pe Tsitsipas (Greece) S Tsitsipas	5	1
(United Kingdom) L Glasspool (Finland) H Heliövaara	7	6
4	(India) D Sharan (Slovakia) I Zelenay	4	2
PR	(Spain) A Davidovich Fokina (Spain) M López	6	6
(Australia) M Ebden (Australia) M Reid	6	7
(Kazakhstan) A Golubev (Monaco) H Nys	4	5
WC	(France) A Olivetti (France) J-W Tsonga	4	4
(Netherlands) S Arends (Netherlands) D Pel	6	6
(Mexico) MÁ Reyes-Varela (Brazil) F Romboli	6^{3}	2
3	(United Kingdom) J O'Mara (Pakistan) A-u-H Qureshi	7^{7}	6
(India) P Raja (Austria) T-S Weissborn	4	6^{1}
(United States) N Lammons (United States) J Withrow	6	7^{7}
(France) B Bonzi (France) A Hoang	6^{4}	7^{7}	[8]
2	(United Kingdom) L Bambridge (United Kingdom) D Inglot	7^{7}	6^{5}	[10]

Quarterfinals
1	(United Kingdom) K Skupski (United Kingdom) N Skupski	6	4	[8]
(United Kingdom) L Glasspool (Finland) H Heliövaara	2	6	[10]
PR	(Spain) A Davidovich Fokina (Spain) M López	6^{5}	1
(Australia) M Ebden (Australia) M Reid	7^{7}	6
(Netherlands) S Arends (Netherlands) D Pel	6	7^{12}
3	(United Kingdom) J O'Mara (Pakistan) A-u-H Qureshi	4	6^{10}
(United States) N Lammons (United States) J Withrow	7^{7}	7^{7}
2	(United Kingdom) L Bambridge (United Kingdom) D Inglot	6^{4}	6^{5}

Semifinals
(United Kingdom) L Glasspool (Finland) H Heliövaara	6	6
(Australia) M Ebden (Australia) M Reid	2	3
(Netherlands) S Arends (Netherlands) D Pel	6	7^{7}
(United States) N Lammons (United States) J Withrow	1	6^{4}

Final
(United Kingdom) L Glasspool (Finland) H Heliövaara	7	7^{7}
(Netherlands) S Arends (Netherlands) D Pel	5	6^{4}
