= 2021 Open 13 Provence =

Men's tennis tournament in Marseille, France

Coordinates: 43.2710°N 5.4010°E

- Date: 8–14 March
- Edition: 29th
- Category: ATP 250 Series
- Draw: 28S / 16D
- Surface: Hard / indoors
- Location: Marseille, France
- Venue: Palais des Sports de Marseille

Champions

Singles
- (Russia) Daniil Medvedev

Doubles
- (United Kingdom) Lloyd Glasspool / (Finland) Harri Heliövaara
- Open 13 Provence

The 2021 Open 13 Provence was a men's tennis tournament played on indoor hard courts. It is the 29th edition of the Open 13, and part of the ATP Tour 250 series of the 2021 ATP Tour. It was the 29th edition of the tournament and took place at the Palais des Sports in Marseille, France, from 8 March until 14 March 2021. First-seeded Daniil Medvedev won the singles title.

== Finals ==
=== Singles ===
- (Russia) Daniil Medvedev defeated (France) Pierre-Hugues Herbert, 6–4, 6–7^{(4–7)}, 6–4

=== Doubles ===
- (United Kingdom) Lloyd Glasspool / (Finland) Harri Heliövaara defeated (Netherlands) Sander Arends / (Netherlands) David Pel, 7–5, 7–6^{(7–4)}

== Singles main-draw entrants ==
=== Seeds ===
Country	Player	Rank^{1}	Seed
RUS	Daniil Medvedev	3	1
GRE	Stefanos Tsitsipas	6	2
RUS	Karen Khachanov	21	3
FRA	Ugo Humbert	31	4
ITA	Jannik Sinner	34	5
JPN	Kei Nishikori	45	6
ESP	Alejandro Davidovich Fokina	51	7
JPN	Yoshihito Nishioka	54	8

- Rankings are as of March 1, 2021.

=== Other entrants ===
The following players received wildcards into the main draw:

- (France) Benjamin Bonzi
- (France) Hugo Gaston
- (Greece) Petros Tsitsipas

The following player received entry using a protected ranking into the main draw:

- (United States) Mackenzie McDonald

The following players received entry from the qualifying draw:

- (Australia) Matthew Ebden
- (France) Constant Lestienne
- (Slovakia) Alex Molčan
- (France) Arthur Rinderknech

=== Withdrawals ===
- (Slovenia) Aljaž Bedene → replaced by (United States) Mackenzie McDonald
- (Italy) Matteo Berrettini → replaced by (Kazakhstan) Mikhail Kukushkin
- (Croatia) Marin Čilić → replaced by (United Kingdom) Cameron Norrie
- (United Kingdom) Kyle Edmund → replaced by (Belarus) Egor Gerasimov
- (France) Gilles Simon → replaced by (France) Lucas Pouille
- (Germany) Jan-Lennard Struff → replaced by (Finland) Emil Ruusuvuori
- (Spain) Fernando Verdasco → replaced by (France) Pierre-Hugues Herbert
- (Czech Republic) Jiří Veselý → replaced by (France) Grégoire Barrère

=== Retirements ===
- (Australia) Matthew Ebden

== Doubles main-draw entrants ==
=== Seeds ===
Country	Player	Country	Player	Rank^{1}	Seed
GBR	Ken Skupski	GBR	Neal Skupski	88	1
GBR	Luke Bambridge	GBR	Dominic Inglot	110	2
GBR	Jonny O'Mara	PAK	Aisam-ul-Haq Qureshi	111	3
IND	Divij Sharan	SVK	Igor Zelenay	142	4

- ^{1} Rankings are as of 1 March 2021.

=== Other entrants ===
The following pairs received wildcards into the doubles main draw:

- (France) Albano Olivetti / (France) Jo-Wilfried Tsonga
- (Greece) Petros Tsitsipas / (Greece) Stefanos Tsitsipas

=== Withdrawals ===
Before the tournament

- (Belgium) Sander Gillé / (Belgium) Joran Vliegen → replaced by (India) Purav Raja / (Austria) Tristan-Samuel Weissborn
- (Czech Republic) Roman Jebavý / (Czech Republic) Jiří Veselý → replaced by (France) Benjamin Bonzi / (France) Antoine Hoang
- (Australia) Matthew Ebden / (Australia) John-Patrick Smith → replaced by (Australia) Matthew Ebden / (Australia) Matt Reid
