= 2020 Open 13 Provence – Doubles =

Doubles
- 2020 Open 13 Provence

Final
- Champions: (France) Nicolas Mahut (Canada) Vasek Pospisil
- Runners-up: (Netherlands) Wesley Koolhof (Croatia) Nikola Mektić
- Score: 6–3, 6–4

Events
Singles	Doubles
← 2019 ·	Open 13	· 2021 →

Jérémy Chardy and Fabrice Martin were the defending champions, but Chardy chose not to participate and Martin chose to compete in Rio de Janeiro instead.

Nicolas Mahut and Vasek Pospisil won the title, defeating Wesley Koolhof and Nikola Mektić in the final, 6–3, 6–4.

== Seeds ==
1. (Germany) Kevin Krawietz / (Germany) Andreas Mies (semifinals)
2. (Netherlands) Wesley Koolhof / (Croatia) Nikola Mektić (final)
3. (United Kingdom) Jamie Murray / (United Kingdom) Neal Skupski (first round)
4. (Austria) Jürgen Melzer / (France) Édouard Roger-Vasselin (quarterfinals)

== Draw ==
=== Key ===
- Q = Qualifier
- WC = Wild card
- LL = Lucky loser
- Alt = Alternate
- ITF = ITF entry
- PR = Protected ranking
- SR = Special ranking
- SE = Special exempt
- JE = Junior exempt
- JR = Junior Accelerator Programme entrant
- CO = College Accelerator Programme entrant
- NG = Next Gen Accelerator Program entrant
- w/o = Walkover
- r = Retired
- d = Defaulted

=== Draw ===
First round
1	(Germany) K Krawietz (Germany) A Mies	6	6^{5}	[10]
WC	(Greece) Pe Tsitsipas (Greece) S Tsitsipas	4	7^{7}	[6]
(France) B Paire (Spain) D Vega Hernández	4	6	[10]
(Kazakhstan) A Bublik (Australia) A Popyrin	6	2	[5]
4	(Austria) J Melzer (France) É Roger-Vasselin	7^{7}	6
(Poland) H Hurkacz (France) G Simon	6^{5}	4
WC	(France) A Cazaux (France) H Mayot	5	1
(France) N Mahut (Canada) V Pospisil	7	6
(India) R Bopanna (Canada) D Shapovalov	6^{6}	6	[10]
(Italy) S Bolelli (Italy) J Sinner	7^{8}	3	[6]
(Denmark) F Nielsen (Germany) T Pütz	3	6	[10]
3	(United Kingdom) J Murray (United Kingdom) N Skupski	6	3	[8]
(Israel) J Erlich (Belarus) A Vasilevski	7^{7}	6
(Chinese Taipei) C-p Hsieh (Ukraine) D Molchanov	6^{3}	3
(Bosnia and Herzegovina) T Brkić (Croatia) M Čilić	5	6	[10]
2	(Netherlands) W Koolhof (Croatia) N Mektić	7	1	[12]

Quarterfinals
1	(Germany) K Krawietz (Germany) A Mies	6	7^{7}
(France) B Paire (Spain) D Vega Hernández	2	6^{5}
4	(Austria) J Melzer (France) É Roger-Vasselin	3	4
(France) N Mahut (Canada) V Pospisil	6	6
(India) R Bopanna (Canada) D Shapovalov	5	7^{7}	[8]
(Denmark) F Nielsen (Germany) T Pütz	7	6^{3}	[10]
(Israel) J Erlich (Belarus) A Vasilevski	3	5
2	(Netherlands) W Koolhof (Croatia) N Mektić	6	7

Semifinals
1	(Germany) K Krawietz (Germany) A Mies	3	2
(France) N Mahut (Canada) V Pospisil	6	6
(Denmark) F Nielsen (Germany) T Pütz	4	2
2	(Netherlands) W Koolhof (Croatia) N Mektić	6	6

Final
(France) N Mahut (Canada) V Pospisil	6	6
2	(Netherlands) W Koolhof (Croatia) N Mektić	3	4
