= 2021 Open 13 Provence – Singles =

Singles
- 2021 Open 13 Provence

Final
- Champion: (Russia) Daniil Medvedev
- Runner-up: (France) Pierre-Hugues Herbert
- Score: 6–4, 6–7^{(4–7)}, 6–4

Details
- Draw: 28 (4 Q / 3 WC )
- Seeds: 8

Events
Singles	Doubles
- Open 13

Daniil Medvedev defeated Pierre-Hugues Herbert in the final, 6–4, 6–7^{(4–7)}, 6–4 to capture the men's singles tennis title at the 2021 Open 13 Provence.

Stefanos Tsitsipas was the two-time defending champion, but lost in the quarterfinals to Herbert.

Medvedev overtook Rafael Nadal as the number 2 ranking following the tournament. This marked the first time in over 15 years that someone outside of the Big Four has been ranked number 2, the last person being Lleyton Hewitt on July 18, 2005.

== Seeds ==
The top four seeds received a bye into the second round.

1. (Russia) Daniil Medvedev (champion)
2. (Greece) Stefanos Tsitsipas (quarterfinals)
3. (Russia) Karen Khachanov (quarterfinals)
4. (France) Ugo Humbert (semifinals)
5. (Italy) Jannik Sinner (quarterfinals)
6. (Japan) Kei Nishikori (first round)
7. (Spain) Alejandro Davidovich Fokina (second round)
8. (Japan) Yoshihito Nishioka (first round, retired)

== Draw ==
Key

- Q = Qualifier
- WC = Wild card
- LL = Lucky loser
- Alt = Alternate
- ITF = ITF entry
- PR = Protected ranking
- SR = Special ranking
- SE = Special exempt
- JE = Junior exempt
- JR = Junior Accelerator Programme entrant
- CO = College Accelerator Programme entrant
- NG = Next Gen Accelerator Program entrant
- w/o = Walkover
- r = Retired
- d = Defaulted

=== Finals ===
Semifinals
1	(Russia) Daniil Medvedev	6	3
Q	(Australia) Matthew Ebden	4	0^{r}
4	(France) Ugo Humbert	3	2
(France) Pierre-Hugues Herbert	6	6

Final
1	(Russia) Daniil Medvedev	6	6^{4}	6
(France) Pierre-Hugues Herbert	4	7^{7}	4

=== Top half ===
First round
(Germany) Y Hanfmann	2	0
(Belarus) E Gerasimov	6	6
(Austria) D Novak	6	4	1
WC	(France) H Gaston	3	6	6
(France) G Barrère	6^{3}	7^{7}	5
5	(Italy) J Sinner	7^{7}	6^{5}	7
(Italy) S Travaglia	6^{2}	6^{1}
PR	(United States) M McDonald	7^{7}	7^{7}
Q	(Australia) M Ebden	3	7^{8}	6
WC	(France) B Bonzi	6	6^{6}	3
(Finland) E Ruusuvuori	6	4
8	(Japan) Y Nishioka	2	2^{r}

Second round
1	(Russia) D Medvedev	6	6
(Belarus) E Gerasimov	2	4
WC	(France) H Gaston	4	1
5	(Italy) J Sinner	6	6
3	(Russia) K Khachanov	7^{7}	6
PR	(United States) M McDonald	6^{4}	4
Q	(Australia) M Ebden	6	6
(Finland) E Ruusuvuori	2	2

Quarterfinals
1	(Russia) D Medvedev	6	6
5	(Italy) J Sinner	2	4
3	(Russia) K Khachanov	6	4	2
Q	(Australia) M Ebden	4	6	6

Semifinals
1	(Russia) D Medvedev	6	3
Q	(Australia) M Ebden	4	0^{r}

=== Bottom half ===
First round
7	(Spain) A Davidovich Fokina	6	6
WC	(Greece) Pe Tsitsipas	0	2
(Kazakhstan) M Kukushkin	6	3	2
Q	(France) A Rinderknech	1	6	6
(France) J-W Tsonga	3	6	7
(Spain) F López	6	4	5
6	(Japan) K Nishikori	1	4
(France) P-H Herbert	6	6
(United Kingdom) C Norrie	6	6^{4}	6
Q	(France) C Lestienne	4	7^{7}	3
(France) L Pouille	7	6
Q	(Slovakia) A Molčan	5	3

Second round
7	(Spain) A Davidovich Fokina	6	1	2
Q	(France) A Rinderknech	3	6	6
(France) J-W Tsonga	3	4
4	(France) U Humbert	6	6
(France) P-H Herbert	6	6
(United Kingdom) C Norrie	3	4
(France) L Pouille	2	3
2	(Greece) S Tsitsipas	6	6

Quarterfinals
Q	(France) A Rinderknech	6	5	6^{4}
4	(France) U Humbert	4	7	7^{7}
(France) P-H Herbert	6^{6}	6	6
2	(Greece) S Tsitsipas	7^{8}	4	2

Semifinals
4	(France) U Humbert	3	2
(France) P-H Herbert	6	6

== Qualifying ==
=== Seeds ===
1. (France) Antoine Hoang (first round)
2. (Australia) Marc Polmans (first round)
3. (France) Arthur Rinderknech (qualified)
4. (Spain) Bernabé Zapata Miralles (first round)
5. (United States) Maxime Cressy (qualifying competition)
6. (Slovakia) Filip Horanský (first round)
7. (Canada) Steven Diez (qualifying competition, retired)
8. (Portugal) Frederico Ferreira Silva (first round)

=== Qualifiers ===
1. (Slovakia) Alex Molčan
2. (France) Constant Lestienne
3. (France) Arthur Rinderknech
4. (Australia) Matthew Ebden

=== Qualifying draw ===
==== First qualifier ====
First round
1	(France) Antoine Hoang	3	6	6^{6}
(Slovakia) Alex Molčan	6	3	7^{8}
(Latvia) Ernests Gulbis	6	6
6	(Slovakia) Filip Horanský	2	4

Qualifying competition
(Slovakia) Alex Molčan	6	6
(Latvia) Ernests Gulbis	2	4

==== Second qualifier ====
First round
2	(Australia) Marc Polmans	4	4
(France) Constant Lestienne	6	6
(Serbia) Viktor Troicki	6	2	2
7	(Canada) Steven Diez	3	6	6

Qualifying competition
(France) Constant Lestienne	2
7	(Canada) Steven Diez	0^{r}

==== Third qualifier ====
First round
3	(France) Arthur Rinderknech	6	6
(France) Maxime Janvier	3	3
WC	(France) Alexandre Müller	3	7^{7}	3
5	(United States) Maxime Cressy	6	6^{5}	6

Qualifying competition
3	(France) Arthur Rinderknech	7^{7}	6
5	(United States) Maxime Cressy	6^{4}	0

==== Fourth qualifier ====
First round
4	(Spain) Bernabé Zapata Miralles	5	6^{4}
WC	(France) Mathias Bourgue	7	7^{7}
Alt	(Australia) Matthew Ebden	6^{5}	6	7^{7}
8	(Portugal) Frederico Ferreira Silva	7^{7}	4	6^{5}

Qualifying competition
WC	(France) Mathias Bourgue	4	3
Alt	(Australia) Matthew Ebden	6	6
