= Richard Gasquet =

French tennis player (born 1986)

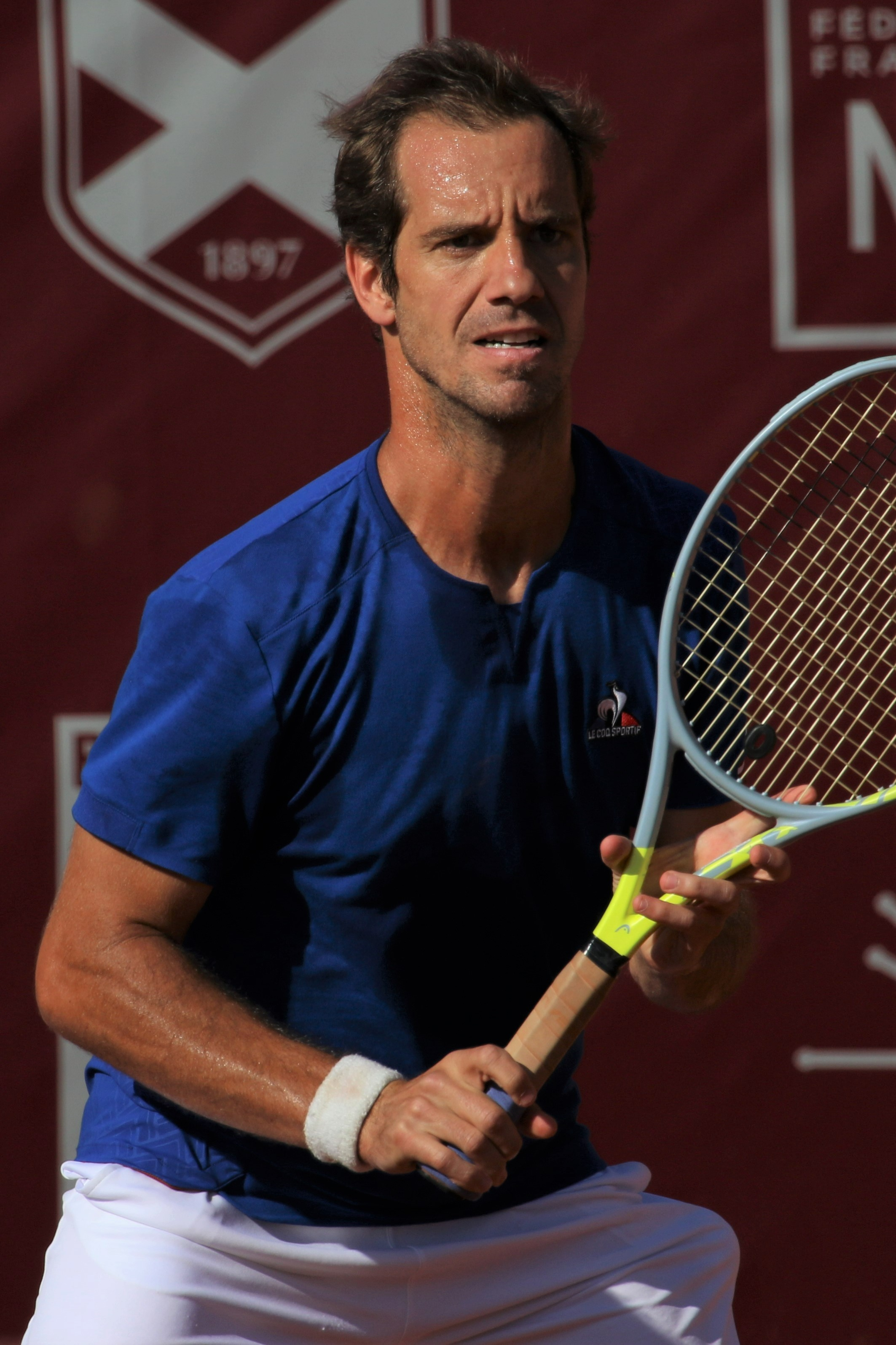
- Gasquet at the 2022 BNP Paribas Primrose Bordeaux
- Full name: Richard Gabriel Cyr Gasquet
- Country (sports): France
- Residence: Neuchâtel, Switzerland
- Born: 18 June 1986 (age 40) Béziers, France
- Height: 1.83 m (6 ft 0 in)
- Turned pro: 2002
- Retired: 2025
- Plays: Right-handed (one-handed backhand)
- Prize money: US$21,504,662: 31st all-time leader in earnings
- Official website: richardgasquet.net

Singles
- Career record: 610–408 (59.9%)
- Career titles: 16
- Highest ranking: No. 7 (9 July 2007)

Grand Slam singles results
- Australian Open: 4R (2007, 2008, 2012, 2013)
- French Open: QF (2016)
- Wimbledon: SF (2007, 2015)
- US Open: SF (2013)

Other tournaments
- Tour Finals: RR (2007, 2013)
- Olympic Games: 2R (2012)

Doubles
- Career record: 72–63
- Career titles: 2
- Highest ranking: No. 45 (7 April 2008)

Grand Slam doubles results
- Australian Open: 1R (2006)
- French Open: 1R (2002, 2003, 2005, 2023)

Other doubles tournaments
- Olympic Games: (2012)

Mixed doubles
- Career record: 11–0
- Career titles: 1

Grand Slam mixed doubles results
- French Open: W (2004)

Team competitions
- Davis Cup: W (2017)
- Hopman Cup: W (2017)
Medal record
Tennis
Representing France
Olympic Games
Bronze medal – third place	2012 London	Men's doubles

Richard Gabriel Cyr Gasquet (French: [ʁiʃaʁ ɡaskɛ]; born 18 June 1986) is a French former professional tennis player. He was ranked as high as world No. 7 in men's singles by the ATP, attained in July 2007. Gasquet won 16 singles titles on the ATP Tour, and earned over 600 career match wins. His best performances in major singles tournaments were three semifinal appearances, two at the Wimbledon Championships (in 2007 and 2015) and one at the US Open (in 2013). His best performance in ATP Masters 1000 tournaments tournaments was runner-up finishes in Hamburg in 2005 and Toronto in 2006 and 2012. Gasquet won the mixed doubles title at the 2004 French Open, partnering Tatiana Golovin, and an Olympic bronze medal in men's doubles at the 2012 London Olympics, partnering Julien Benneteau. Gasquet was best known for his elegant groundstrokes and his one-handed backhand.

== Early life ==
Gasquet was born on 18 June 1986, in Béziers, France, where he was raised. His mother, Maryse, and his father, Francis, were both biology teachers and ran a local tennis club in Sérignan. This had an influence on Gasquet and he began playing tennis at the age of 4 with his dad at the club. Soon after, he was discovered by former world number 9 Pierre Barthès who ran a tennis camp at the nearby seaside resort of Cap d'Agde.

When he was 9 years old, Gasquet was touted as a future champion on the cover of the February 1996 issue of French Tennis Magazine.

== Junior career (1999–2002) ==
Gasquet played his first junior match in April 1999 at the age of 12 at a grade 3 tournament in France. Throughout the rest of the year, Gasquet dominated the U14 circuit in the Tennis Europe Junior Tour, collecting the three most prestigious trophies of the year at Tim Essonne, Les Petits As, and the European Junior Championships at San Remo. In the latter two finals, he defeated Brian Baker and Jerome Becker respectively, but perhaps the most significant match of the year was the Les Petits quarterfinal match against the 12-year-old Rafael Nadal, which Gasquet won 6–7, 6–3, 6–4.

As a junior, he posted a 44–7 career singles record and a 10–4 career doubles record. He had a career-high juniors singles ranking of world No. 1, attained on 9 September 2002, at the age of 16 years and 3 months. During the same year, he made the semifinals of the Junior Australian Open and won the Junior French Open and the Junior US Open, winning the final of the former against compatriot Laurent Recouderc in just 45 minutes, the shortest final in the event's history.

Junior Grand Slam results - Singles:

Australian Open: SF (2002)
French Open: W (2002)
Wimbledon: A (-)
US Open: W (2002)

These wins helped launch his career, and many thought that he would become a future world number 1, with the French media heralding him as their bastion of hope and calling him the “Mozart of tennis” when he was just 15 years old.

== Professional career ==
=== 2002: ATP and Grand Slam debut, top 200 ===
Gasquet made his debut on the ATP tour in April 2002, at the Tennis Masters Series tournament in Monte Carlo where he received a wildcard into qualifying and became the youngest player ever to qualify for a Tennis Masters Series event. At the age of 15 years and 10 months, he defeated Argentina's Franco Squillari in the first round of that tournament to become the youngest player to win a top-tier tour (ATP Tour, Grand Prix tennis circuit or World Championship Tennis) main draw singles match since Tommy Ho at Rye Brook in 1988.

Gasquet made his Grand Slam tournament debut at the 2002 French Open at the age of 15 years, 11 months and nine days. He was the second-youngest player ever to compete in the main draw there. Despite his lack of experience, he managed to take a set off the eventual champion Albert Costa in the first round. Gasquet finished 2002 as the No. 1 junior in the world and was named World Junior Champion, having won the junior titles at the French Open and the US Open. Aged 16 years and 6 months, he became both the youngest year-end World No. 1 in junior rankings (since broken by Donald Young in 2005), and also the youngest player in history to finish in the year-end ATP top 200.

=== 2004: French Open mixed doubles champion, first singles final ===
In 2004, Gasquet reached his first ATP Tour singles final in Metz, losing to his countryman Jérôme Haehnel in straight sets. He also won the mixed doubles title at the French Open that year, partnering Tatiana Golovin.

=== 2005: First title & Masters final, win over world No. 1 ===
Gasquet missed the first seven weeks of the 2005 season because of chickenpox. Upon recovery, he won back-to-back Challenger titles in March. In April, riding the momentum of a ten-match winning streak, Gasquet reached the semifinals of the Masters Series tournament at Monte Carlo, handing world No. 1 Roger Federer a surprise defeat in the quarterfinals. He saved three match points before closing it out in a 10–8 tiebreak. As a result, he became the youngest French player ever to defeat a world No. 1. However, the eventual champion Rafael Nadal defeated him in the semifinals.

Fresh off of Gasquet's win over Federer and having just beaten Paradorn Srichaphan in straight sets, the rising teen disappointingly lost against Andre Agassi in Rome. A month later, he reached the final of the Hamburg Masters, where, this time, he was defeated by Federer in three sets.

In May, Gasquet won his first Grand Slam singles match at Roland Garros. On 18 June, his 19th birthday, he won his first ATP Tour singles title beating Max Mirnyi in the final of the Nottingham Open in England on grass. He made his Davis Cup debut against Russia in July where he won his first rubber against Igor Andreev but lost second to Nikolay Davydenko.

Gasquet had to miss the last two months of the season because of an elbow injury. He finished the year as French number one for the first time.

=== 2006: Three ATP titles on three different surfaces, second Masters final ===
In 2006, Gasquet had a slow start after a first-round defeat by Tommy Haas at the Australian Open. He later avenged this defeat in the Davis Cup first-round tie against Germany, where he beat Haas in five sets. However, he lost both his singles rubbers in a quarterfinal tie versus Russia and suffered an abdominal injury in that tie which left him out of action for a month. In the Davis Cup match against Marat Safin, British TV presenter Barry Cowan described him as "naturally more talented than Federer". Having struggled to find any form after his comeback during the clay season, Gasquet went out in the second round of the French Open to David Nalbandian.

Following a disappointing opening half of the season, in the space of three weeks Gasquet successfully defended his title at Nottingham, lost in a first-round meeting with Roger Federer at Wimbledon, and won his second title of the year on clay in Gstaad. Gasquet's form continued to improve heading towards the US Open, as he reached the final of the Masters Series event in Toronto, again being halted by Federer in three sets. He reached the fourth round of the US Open for the second year in a row, where he lost to Lleyton Hewitt in five sets.

In October, Gasquet won his third ATP Tour singles title of the year, this time on indoor carpet in Lyon, completing his achievement of reaching ATP Tour singles finals on all four surfaces during the year. His season ended when he withdrew from his third round singles match against Marat Safin at the Paris Masters due to illness.

=== 2007: First Grand Slam singles semifinal, world No. 7; Monte Carlo doubles final ===
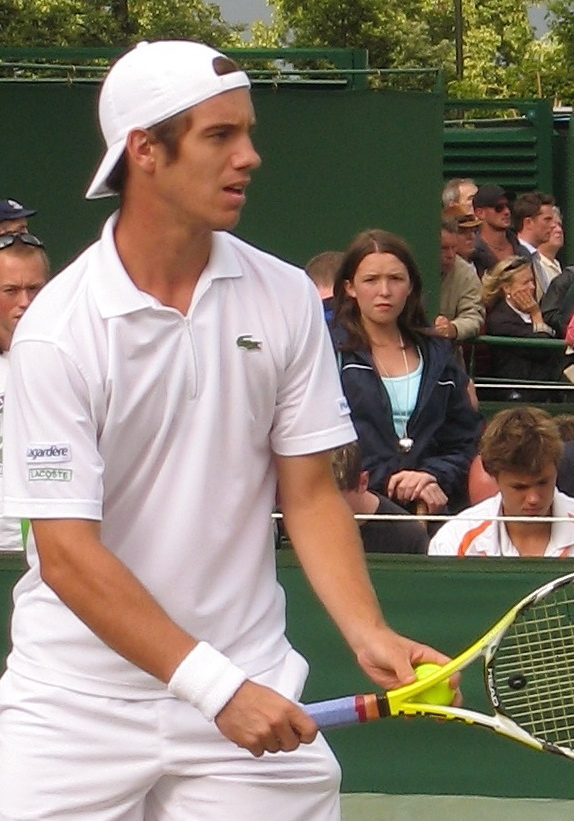
Gasquet at the 2007 Wimbledon Championships

Gasquet's 2007 started with a quarterfinal showing in Adelaide, followed by a semifinal appearance in Sydney. He went on to reach the fourth round of the Australian Open, losing to Tommy Robredo in four sets. At Monte Carlo, he notched his first win over a top-10 opponent of the year, winning his third-round match over Ivan Ljubičić, ranked No. 8 at the time. However, he then lost his quarterfinal match to twice former Monte Carlo champion Juan Carlos Ferrero. Gasquet reached his first final of the season two weeks later at Estoril, but the up-and-coming Serbian player Novak Djokovic got the better of him in three sets.

Gasquet reached the doubles final of the Monte Carlo Masters with Julien Benneteau, where the French team lost to Bob and Mike Bryan. Despite losing in the second round of the French Open to Kristof Vliegen, he rose two spots to a career high No. 11.

Gasquet then made his first Grand Slam semifinal at Wimbledon. He beat fellow Frenchmen Nicolas Mahut and Jo-Wilfried Tsonga on his way to a quarterfinal showdown with Andy Roddick. In one of the great Wimbledon quarterfinals, Gasquet recovered from a sluggish start and a deficit of two sets and a break in the third, to upset the two-time finalist by a scoreline in five sets. Gasquet managed to score an amazing 93 winners, many of which were with his trademark backhand down the line. He lost in the semifinals to Federer (who beat him in the first round of the same event the previous year). He made his top-10 debut at No. 7 as a result, his highest ranking to date.

The following week in Gstaad, as defending champion, Gasquet beat Rubén Ramírez Hidalgo and avenged his Roland Garros loss to Kristof Vliegen, but lost in the quarterfinals to Igor Andreev. He bowed out at the 2007 US Open because of a virus. Gasquet returned to action in Mumbai, India winning his fifth career ATP title by beating Olivier Rochus in the final. He followed this up by reaching the final of the Tokyo ATP tournament, losing to David Ferrer in straight sets.

Gasquet took a few weeks break and then played in Lyon where he was defending champion. He lost to Tsonga (whom he beat at Wimbledon) in the third round in straight sets. At the Paris Masters, Gasquet defeated Tsonga in the second round and sixth seed James Blake in the third round. He beat Andy Murray in the quarterfinals to reach the semifinals, where he was stopped by David Nalbandian in straight sets. With his performance in Paris, Gasquet qualified for the Tennis Masters Cup, clinching eighth place. At the Tennis Masters Cup, Gasquet was defeated by Rafael Nadal in his first round-robin match. He then defeated Novak Djokovic, but lost to David Ferrer. Gasquet failed to qualify for the semifinals, placing third in his group.

=== 2008: 150 singles wins on the ATP Tour ===
Gasquet started out the year as the top seed of the Sydney Medibank International, but made an early second-round exit to eventual champion Dmitry Tursunov. Gasquet played with Tsonga in the doubles final of the Sydney Medibank International, scoring a major upset over world No. 1 duo Bob and Mike Bryan. The French combination came back from two match points down to win the championship and deny the Bryan brothers ever winning the tournament. After defeating Nick Lindahl, Feliciano López, and Igor Andreev, Gasquet lost in four sets in the fourth round of the Australian Open to eventual finalist Jo-Wilfried Tsonga.

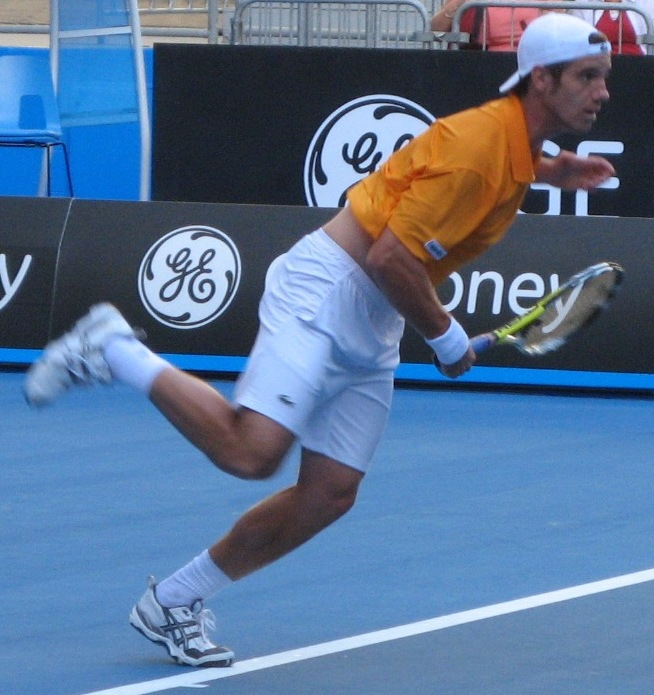
Gasquet in the first round of the 2008 Australian Open

At Gasquet's next two tournaments, the Open 13 at Marseille, France, and Barclays Dubai Tennis Championships, he suffered second-round defeats to Robin Söderling and Igor Andreev. At the ATP Masters Series tournament in Indian Wells, Gasquet lost in straight sets in the fourth round to James Blake. At the next ATP Masters Series tournament in Key Biscayne, Florida, he lost in the first round to Dmitry Tursunov. And at the U.S. vs France World Group quarterfinal Davis Cup match, Gasquet lost in three sets to Blake in the opening round. Then, in a controversial move, he opted out of a key reverse-singles match against Andy Roddick. After winning his first-round match at Monte Carlo, Gasquet's poor form continued as he lost in the second round to Sam Querrey, and then both of his opening-round matches in Rome and Hamburg to Luis Horna and to Andreas Seppi, respectively.

With a string of disappointing results behind him, Gasquet admitted feeling burnt out, in dire need of a rest from tennis, and a reluctance to play the French Open. He changed coaches immediately ahead of the French Open and pulled out of his first-round match against Florent Serra, citing a knee injury. Gasquet, later announced his decision to not take part in the upcoming Beijing Olympics, preferring instead to prepare for the US Open. He joined fellow top-ten players Andy Roddick, Mardy Fish and former top-10 player Tommy Haas, a silver medalist in 2000 at the Sydney Olympic Games to opt out of that year's Olympic Games.

Gasquet began the grass-court season at Queen's Club, where he defeated Mario Ančić of Croatia in the second round, and Italian Simone Bolelli in the third round. However, in his quarterfinal match, he fell to David Nalbandian of Argentina. This was Gasquet's first quarterfinal appearance in a tournament that year. At Wimbledon, Gasquet was the eighth seed and defeated American Mardy Fish in the first round. In his next two matches, he defeated a pair of his compatriots, Sébastien Grosjean and Gilles Simon. He went out to Andy Murray in the fourth round despite serving for the match at 5–4 in the third set.

At the new tennis rankings posted on 7 July 2008, Gasquet fell five places from No. 10 to 15, the first time in nine months that Gasquet's ranking fell outside the top 10, the lowest he had been ranked since April 2007. At the Mercedes Cup in Stuttgart, Germany, Gasquet was the second seed and reached his first ATP tour semifinal and final of the year, defeating Spaniard Albert Montañés in the quarterfinals and sixth-seeded Argentine Agustín Calleri in the semifinals. Favourite to win the tournament, Gasquet suffered a surprise defeat in the finals to Argentine teenager Juan Martín del Potro in straight sets. Gasquet began with a first-round win over Frenchman Michaël Llodra in the Cincinnati Masters, after Llodra retired, and then lost in the second round to Dmitry Tursunov in straight sets. Gasquet made a first-round exit from the US Open, losing against Tommy Haas in five sets.

=== 2009: Struggles with form and testing positive for cocaine ===
Gasquet began his 2009 tour season at the Brisbane International. Gasquet came back from a set down to defeat Marc Gicquel in the first round. He then had a straight-set win over American Taylor Dent in the second round and defeated second seed Jo-Wilfried Tsonga in the quarterfinals. He lost to Radek Štěpánek in the semifinals. Gasquet then traveled to Sydney, Australia for the Medibank International. He defeated defending champion Dmitry Tursunov in the first round and second seed and compatriot Gilles Simon in straight sets in the second. Gasquet then defeated countryman Jérémy Chardy, before losing to David Nalbandian in the semifinals. At the Australian Open, he won his first-round match against Argentine Diego Junqueira and defeated Denis Istomin in the second round. In the third round, he lost to Fernando González in a five-set match that lasted over four hours. He held a match point in the third-set tiebreak, but was unable to convert it.

Gasquet had to pull out of the tournament in Marseille because of a right-shoulder injury. His next tournament was Dubai. In the first round, he defeated Marat Safin. He then defeated Simone Bolelli and received a walkover into the semifinals following Andy Murray's withdrawal because of illness, where he was then defeated by David Ferrer. He then participated in the Davis Cup with Gilles Simon, Jo-Wilfried Tsonga, and Gaël Monfils against the Czech Republic in the first round. Gasquet teamed up with Michaël Llodra (who replaced Monfils) to play the doubles rubber on day two, but they lost in four sets against Radek Štěpánek and Tomáš Berdych. France then went on to lose the tie 2–3, the first time they had exited in the first round since 2000. His next tournament was the BNP Paribas Open Masters 1000 in Indian Wells. He received a bye in the first round, and then defeated compatriot Michaël Llodra, before losing to Fernando Verdasco in the third round.

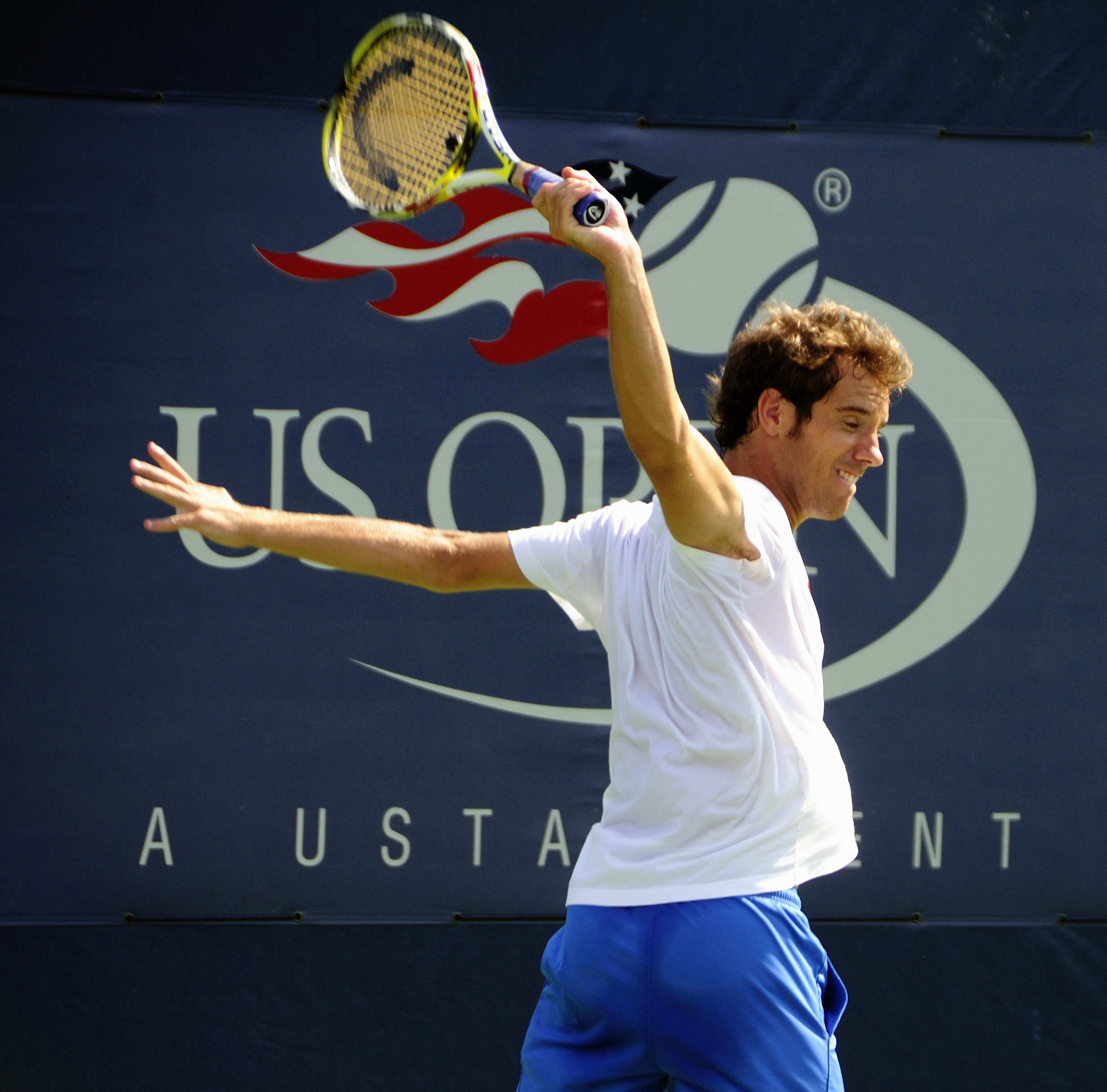
Gasquet after hitting a backhand at the 2009 US Open

In May 2009, Gasquet was provisionally suspended after testing positive for cocaine. Traces of the drug were found in a urine sample taken in March 2009. In July 2009, he was cleared to return to competitive tennis after a tribunal found that "the cocaine entered his system through inadvertent contamination in a nightclub". Gasquet suggested that the cocaine entered his system after he French-kissed a stripper, known only by her first name "Pamela", in a Miami nightclub. The tribunal stated that the quantity of cocaine detected in Gasquet's sample was "very small, about the size of a grain of salt".

Gasquet made his return to the tour at the Pilot Pen championship in New Haven to qualify for the main draw, but lost in the second round of qualifying. Playing his first Grand Slam since January, Gasquet drew Rafael Nadal in the first round of the US Open and lost in straight sets.

Gasquet made a solid run at his next tournament, the Open de Moselle in Metz, beating Michael Berrer, Christophe Rochus and Philipp Petzschner to reach his first ATP semifinal since January. He lost to eventual winner Gaël Monfils.

Gasquet also made the quarterfinals in the Kuala Lumpur Open 250 tournament in Malaysia, losing to Fernando Verdasco; despite leading 3–0 in the first set.

=== 2010: Return to form, sixth title, back to top 10 ===
Gasquet began the season at the Brisbane International. He defeated Jarkko Nieminen and Australian qualifier Matthew Ebden, but he lost to Andy Roddick in the quarterfinals. He then entered the Medibank International in Sydney. There, he beat Feliciano López in the first round, and Benjamin Becker in the second. Gasquet then defeated Potito Starace in the quarterfinals and Julien Benneteau in the semifinals. However, he lost in the final to Marcos Baghdatis.

At the Australian Open, Gasquet lost to Mikhail Youzhny in five sets in the first round, despite having several match points in the third and fourth sets. Gasquet withdrew from both the Movistar Open and the Brasil Open because of a recurring injury, but returned at the Copa Telmex, where he lost in the first round to Juan Ignacio Chela.

Next, Gasquet played the Abierto Mexicano Telcel tournament, where he defeated Carlos Moyá in the first round. In the second round, however, he lost to defending champion Nicolás Almagro. He lost in the first round of both the BNP Paribas Open to Simon Greul, and the Sony Ericsson Open to Olivier Rochus. In April, he played at the Grand Prix Hassan II tournament, where he defeated Olivier Rochus and Andrey Golubev, before losing to Victor Hănescu in the quarterfinals. At the Monte-Carlo Masters, Gasquet advanced to the second round after a three-set win over Spain's Daniel Gimeno-Traver, but was defeated by Tomáš Berdych. He lost to Fernando Verdasco in the second round of Barcelona, after defeating Igor Andreev in the first round. Gasquet defeated Olivier Rochus and Andreas Seppi in the Serbian Open, but lost to John Isner despite being two points away from victory and a break up in the final set. Gasquet then played in a Challenger event in Bordeaux, where he defeated Thierry Ascione, Alex Bogdanovic, Olivier Rochus, and Florent Serra in straight sets, before defeating Michaël Llodra in the final.

As preparation for the French Open, Gasquet entered the Open de Nice. He advanced to the final with wins over Lukáš Lacko, Alexandr Dolgopolov, Olivier Rochus, and Potito Starace. He faced second seed Verdasco in the final and prevailed in three sets, breaking a five-match losing streak against Verdasco. Richard lost his first-round match of the French Open against fourth seed Andy Murray in five sets. Gasquet then played in the Aegon Championships in preparation for Wimbledon, and won against Kei Nishikori and Rajeev Ram, but withdrew in the third round due to a back injury. He also withdrew from Wimbledon as a result.

After being sidelined for a lengthy period, Richard then appeared at the Suisse Open in Gstaad. Seeded seventh, Gasquet had victories over Farrukh Dustov, Daniel Brands, and fourth seed Albert Montañés to reach the semifinals. In the semifinals, he defeated Yuri Schukin for a place in the final, where he lost to Nicolás Almagro. At the Cincinnati Masters, he reached the third round, beating Mikhail Youzhny, before falling to Mardy Fish. At the US Open he brushed aside sixth seed Nikolay Davydenko in the second round, the Russian winning a mere nine games. He lost in the fourth round to Gaël Monfils in straight sets, despite having held set points in both the second and third sets. At the Shanghai Masters, Gasquet advanced to the third round, defeating Ernests Gulbis and Monfils, before losing to Novak Djokovic. He reached the quarterfinals in Basel before falling to Victor Troicki in a lacklustre display. At the Paris Masters, he outlasted Nicolas Mahut in a marathon, winning 9–7 in the third set tiebreak, before falling to Roger Federer in straight sets in the second round. He made the Davis Cup team for France in the final against Serbia.

=== 2011: 250 career singles wins on the ATP Tour ===
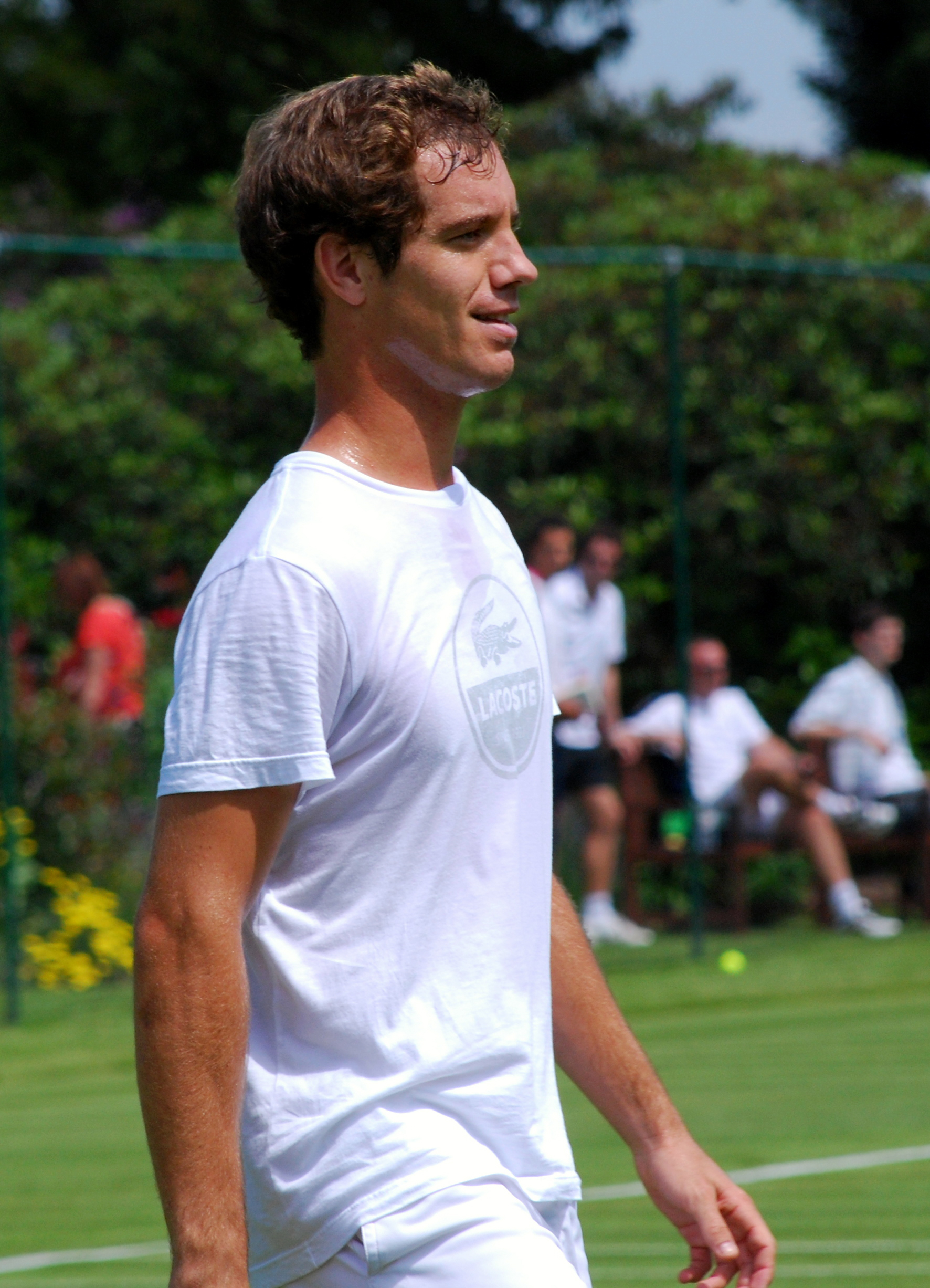
Gasquet at the 2011 Boodles Challenge

Gasquet began 2011 at the Chennai Open, losing to Björn Phau. He then headed to Australia to play in the Medibank International Sydney, losing to Viktor Troicki. Afterwards he played in the Australian Open, losing in the third round to Tomáš Berdych. He then competed at the Zagreb Indoors, where he reached the quarterfinals after a bye and the withdrawal of Arnaud Clément. However, he retired against Michael Berrer, 2–5 down due to a shoulder injury.

After a short break, he played in the Dubai Tennis Championships, where he defeated qualifiers Grigor Dimitrov and Sergei Bubka, as well as compatriot Gilles Simon, before he lost to top seed Roger Federer in the semifinals in straight sets, despite serving for the second set.

At the BNP Paribas Open, Gasquet defeated top-10 players Jürgen Melzer and Andy Roddick back to back. It was the first time in his career that he had defeated two top-10 players consecutively. He lost to eventual champion Novak Djokovic in the quarterfinals. With this result, he made his return to the top 20 of the rankings. In Miami, he played Paolo Lorenzi, who upset Ivan Ljubičić, in the second round. He won that match, but fell to Mardy Fish. Gasquet then played in the Monte-Carlo Masters, where he had a tough first-round victory over Denis Istomin. He then breezed through his second-round match against Guillermo García-López, before falling to Rafael Nadal in the third round.

At the Mutua Madrid Open, Gasquet was defeated in the first round by the Spaniard Daniel Gimeno-Traver. At the Italian Open, he played Roger Federer in the third round, and came from behind to claim a spectacular victory in three sets with two tiebreaks. He was defeated by Rafael Nadal in the semifinals.

At the French Open, Gasquet cruised through his first two rounds before impressively defeating Thomaz Bellucci in four sets in front of an animated Parisian crowd. He, however, lost to Novak Djokovic in straight sets in the fourth round. He rose to world No. 13 as a result of this run.

At Wimbledon, Gasquet was defeated in the fourth round by Andy Murray. He reached the third rounds of the Rogers Cup in Canada and the Southern & Western Open in Cincinnati, where he was defeated by Nicolás Almagro and Mardy Fish, respectively. At the US Open, he lost in the second round to Ivo Karlović.

=== 2012: Olympic Bronze in doubles, Hopman Cup & third Masters finals ===
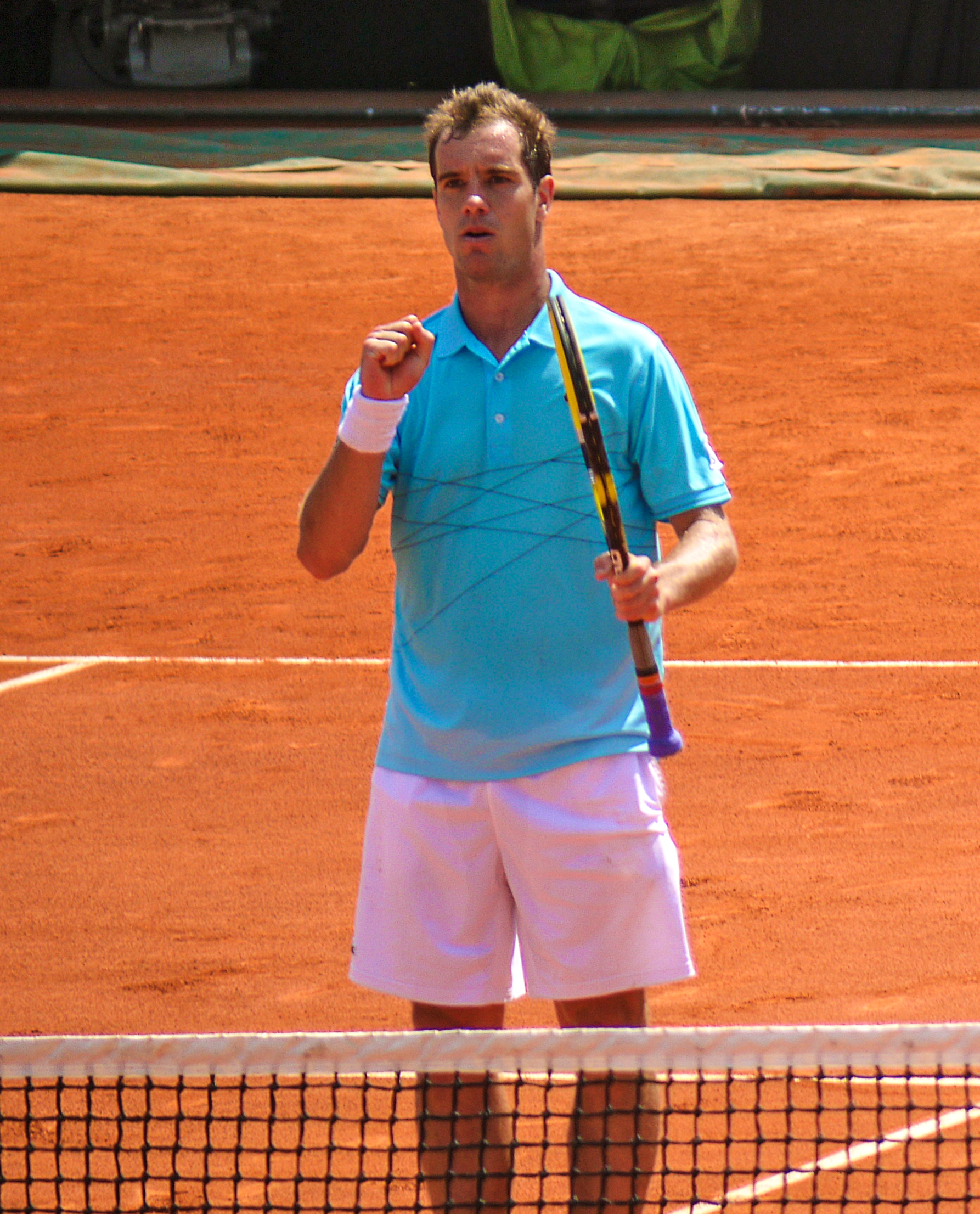
Gasquet at the 2012 French Open

Coached by Riccardo Piatti, Gasquet kicked off his 2012 season by competing at the 2012 Hopman Cup alongside top-10 WTA pro Marion Bartoli. The French won all three of their round-robin ties to reach the final, where they lost to the Czech Republic. Gasquet lost in the quarterfinals in Sydney to Denis Istomin. He competed in the Australian Open shortly afterward, defeating Andreas Seppi, Andrey Golubev, and ninth seed Janko Tipsarević en route to the fourth round. There, he faced and lost to fifth seed David Ferrer. Immediately thereafter, he made the quarterfinals at the Open Sud de France, where he lost to Philipp Kohlschreiber.

In February, Gasquet made the quarterfinals in Rotterdam, before losing to Nikolay Davydenko in straight sets. In Indian Wells, he lost his first match to Albert Ramos. Gasquet reached the fourth round in Miami, but was defeated by eventual champion Novak Djokovic. He reached the final in Estoril, where he lost to Juan Martín del Potro in straight sets. In Madrid, Gasquet beat Thomaz Bellucci and Victor Troicki, before succumbing to Roger Federer. Gasquet defeated Andy Murray in the third round of the Rome Masters, but lost to David Ferrer in the quarterfinals.

Gasquet reached the fourth round of the French Open, before losing to Andy Murray. At Wimbledon he lost in the fourth round to Florian Mayer and in the US Open he lost at the same stage to David Ferrer. At the 2012 Summer Olympics, Gasquet played in both the singles and doubles competitions. In the singles, he lost to Marcos Baghdatis in the second round. He had more success in the doubles, however, as he and Julien Benneteau defeated Spaniards David Ferrer and Feliciano López in the third-place playoff to win the bronze medals.

=== 2013: 300th match win, Second Major semifinal, three ATP titles ===
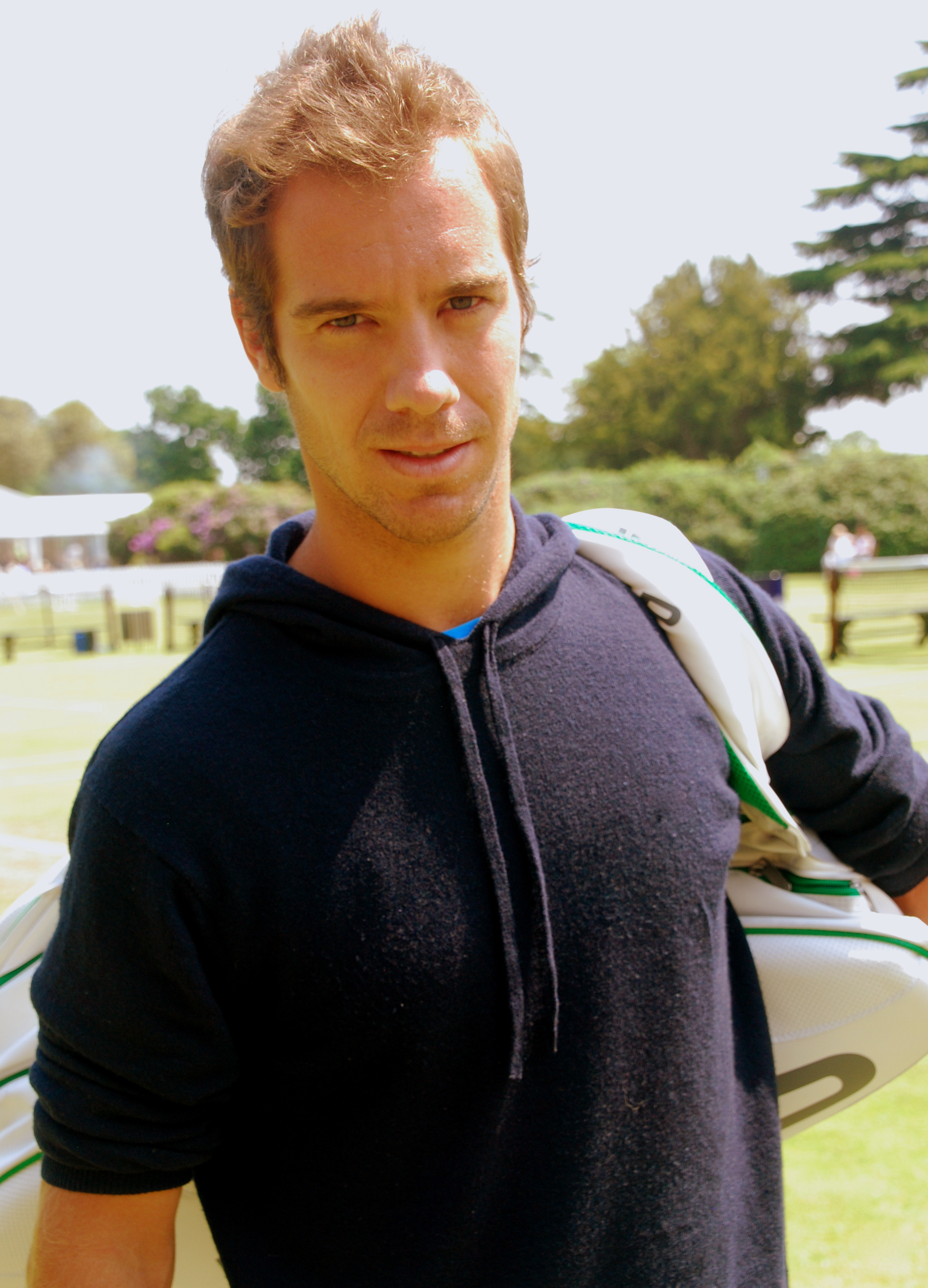
Gasquet at the 2013 Boodles Challenge

Gasquet started his 2013 season by capturing the title in Doha. He recorded his 300th match win defeating Grega Zemlja in the second round. In the final, he defeated former finalist Nikolay Davydenko in three sets. He followed that win by reaching the fourth round of the Australian Open, where he met and lost to Jo-Wilfried Tsonga in four sets. Gasquet won his second title of the year defeating fellow Frenchman Benoît Paire in the 2013 Open Sud de France final. At the French Open, he lost in the fourth round to Stanislas Wawrinka despite winning the first two sets. As the ninth seed, Gasquet reached the third round at the 2013 Wimbledon Championships where he lost to Bernard Tomic in four sets, despite winning 13 more points than his Australian opponent.

At the US Open, Gasquet made it to the singles semifinals, his best run at a Grand Slam event since the 2007 Wimbledon tournament. He defeated David Ferrer in the quarterfinals, once again letting a two-set lead slip before holding his nerve to win 6–3 in the fifth. He was beaten in the semifinals by eventual champion Rafael Nadal in straight sets.

Nevertheless, Gasquet's run strengthened his grip on a top-10 position, and he went on to reach the World Tour Finals for the second time in his career, once again being eliminated in the group stage after defeats by Juan Martín del Potro and Roger Federer.

=== 2014: Struggles and injuries, Davis Cup final ===
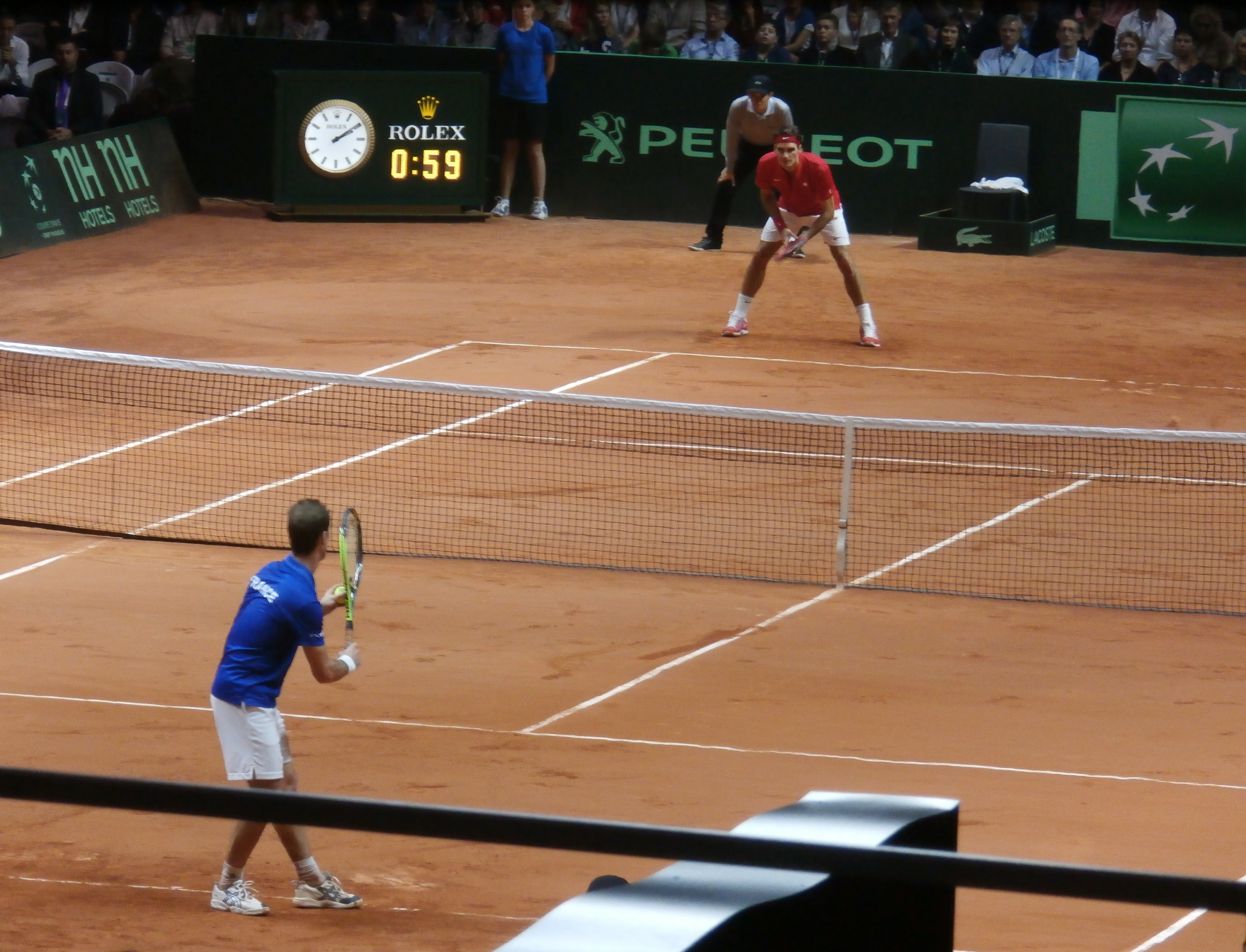
Gasquet serving against Roger Federer at the 2014 Davis Cup final

Gasquet started his 2014 season in the Qatar Exxon Mobil Open in Doha, where he was the defending champion. He lost to Gaël Monfils in the second round. In the third round of the Australian Open, he was defeated by Tommy Robredo in four sets, despite taking the first set 6–2. Gasquet returned to Montpellier to defend his title at the Open Sud de France, but was defeated by Monfils in the final. At the ABN AMRO World Tennis Tournament, Gasquet was defeated in the second round by Philipp Kohlschreiber. He reached the third round of the Indian Wells Masters. At Miami, he defeated Alejandro Gonzalez and Kevin Anderson in straight sets. However, in the fourth round, he was defeated by Roger Federer. Gasquet made his return from back injury at the French Open. He reach the third round, before being defeated by Fernando Verdasco.

Gasquet open his grass-court season with a loss to Robin Haase at the Gerry Weber Open. He then reached the final of the Aegon International. In the final, he was defeated by defending champion Feliciano Lopez for the first time in five meetings. Gasquet suffered further misery in the second round at Wimbledon, when he once again relinquished a two-set lead, this time to wild-card Nick Kyrgios, losing a joint Grand Slam record nine match points in the process. Gasquet defeated Denis Istomin and Paolo Lorenzi to reach the third round of the US Open. In the third round, he was defeated by Gaël Monfils. Toward the end of the season, Gasquet struggled with injury and slipped down in the rankings to No. 27. His last match of the year was a very one-sided loss against Roger Federer in the decisive rubber of the Davis Cup final.

=== 2015: Comeback, third Major semifinal, return to top 10 ===
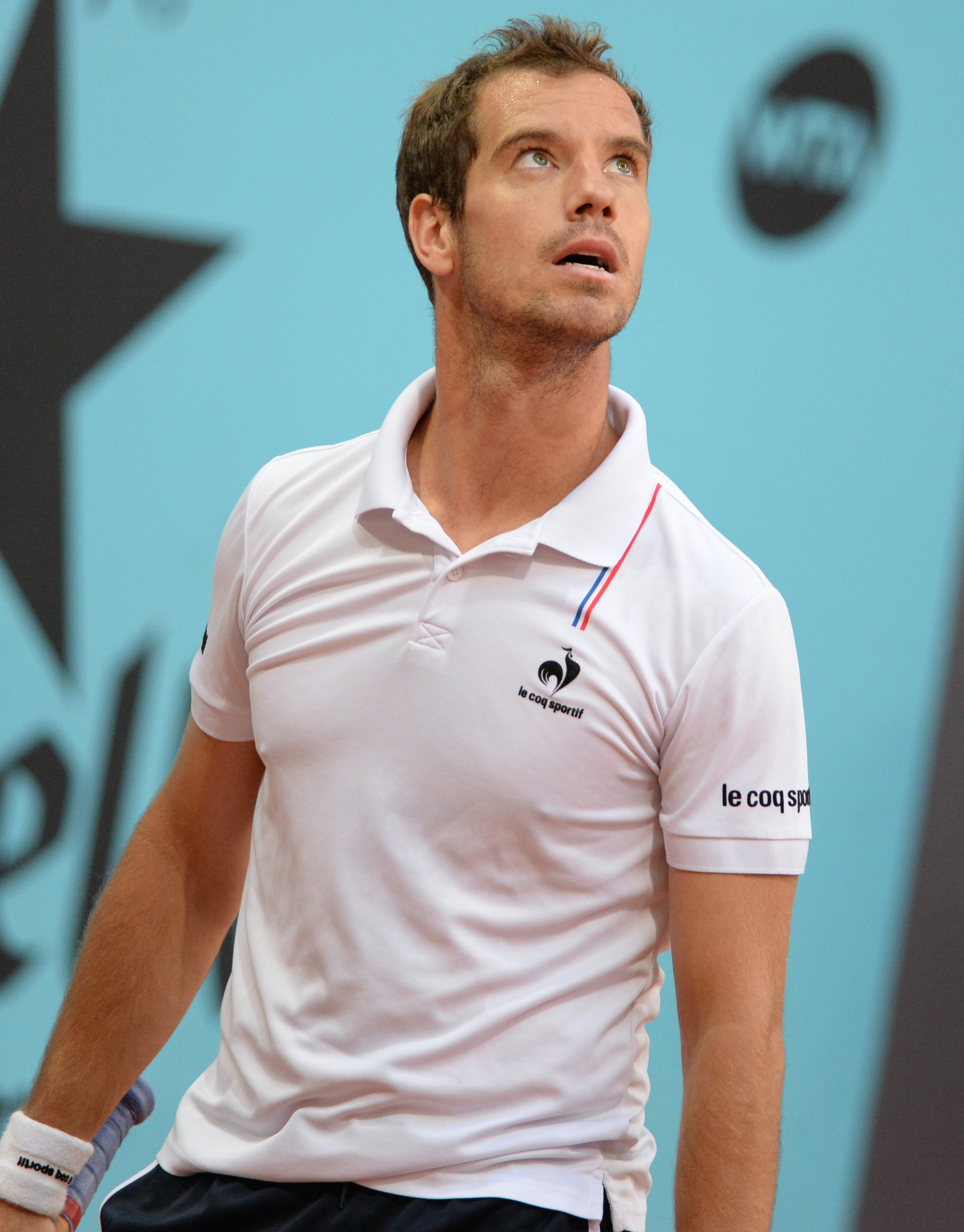
Gasquet at the 2015 Mutua Madrid Open

Gasquet started his 2015 season in the Qatar ExxonMobil Open. He lost to Tomáš Berdych in quarterfinal match. In the third round of the Australian Open, he was defeated by Kevin Anderson. Gasquet returned to Montpellier to win his 11th ATP Tour singles title at the Open Sud de France, after his victory in the final over the injured Jerzy Janowicz. He also won his 12th ATP Tour singles title at the Estoril Open beating Nick Kyrgios who reached the final of an ATP Tour tournament for the first time in his career. This victory made Gasquet one of only eight active players to be placed in the top 10 for number of titles, finals and semifinals attained.

At the French Open, Gasquet reached the fourth round, where he lost to Novak Djokovic in straight sets. At Gasquet's first grass court tournament of the season, the Aegon Championships at Queen's Club, he beat Simone Bolelli in the first round before losing to the third-seeded seed Milos Raonic in the second round. At Wimbledon, he defeated three top-30 players, including 2014 Wimbledon semifinalist Grigor Dimitrov, 2014 Wimbledon quarterfinalist Nick Kyrgios and 2015 French Open Champion Stanislas Wawrinka. He was ousted by the defending and eventual champion Novak Djokovic in the semifinals in straight sets. This ended his best run in Wimbledon since 2007, where he reached the semifinals as well. Gasquet's good performance at Wimbledon elevated his ATP singles ranking seven places up to world No. 13. He would finish the remainder of the season on a high note. He lost in the quarterfinals of the US Open to Roger Federer and in the semifinals in Stockholm and Basel (to Jack Sock and Rafael Nadal respectively) before losing to Andy Murray in the quarterfinals of the Paris Masters. Gasquet's strong play was enough to secure a year-end top 10 finish in the singles rankings for the fourth time in his career.

=== 2016: 13th and 14th ATP Tour singles titles, first French Open singles quarterfinal and injuries ===
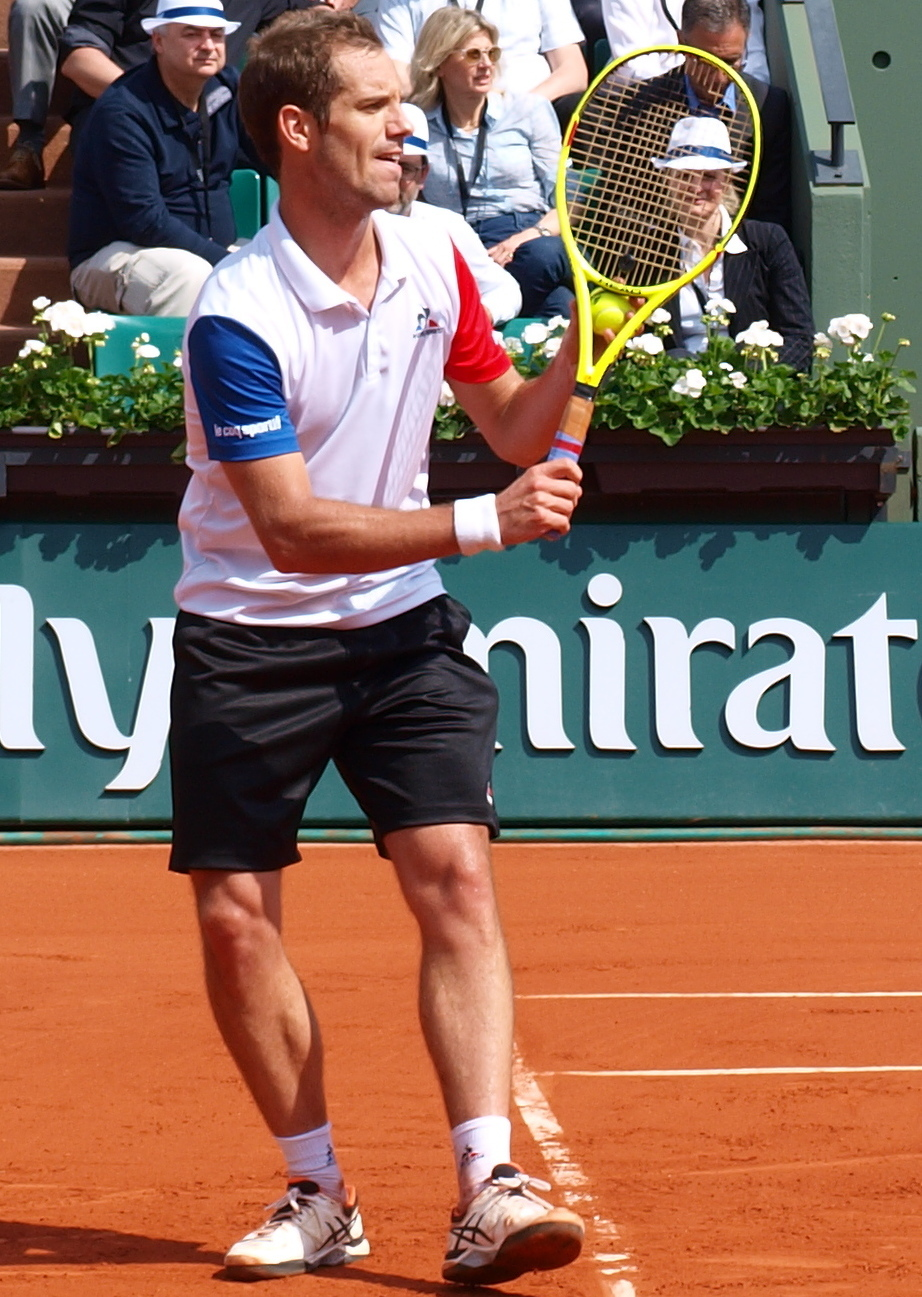
Gasquet serving at the 2016 French Open

Shortly before the new year, Gasquet withdrew from the Australian Open due to a back injury. Gasquet then competed at Open Sud de France in Montpellier where he was the No. 1 seed and where he received a bye into the second round. He started his campaign with straight sets victories over Ernests Gulbis and Marcos Baghdatis respectively before defeating Dustin Brown in the semifinals in three sets and Paul-Henri Mathieu in the final in straight sets to retain his singles title and win his third Open Sud de France singles title.

At the French Open, Gasquet, seeded ninth, ousted fifth seed Kei Nishikori in four sets in the fourth round to reach his first French Open singles quarterfinal, where he lost to second seed Andy Murray in four sets. At Wimbledon, Gasquet was playing his fourth-round match against Tsonga when the former retired down 2–4 in the first set because of pain in his back intercostal muscles.

Gasquet withdrew from the 2016 Olympics tennis tournament because of his back injury. In the men's singles draw, Gasquet was replaced by his compatriot Benoît Paire, while in the men's doubles draw he was replaced by Gaël Monfils, who paired up with Tsonga.

=== 2017: Hopman Cup & Davis Cup victories ===
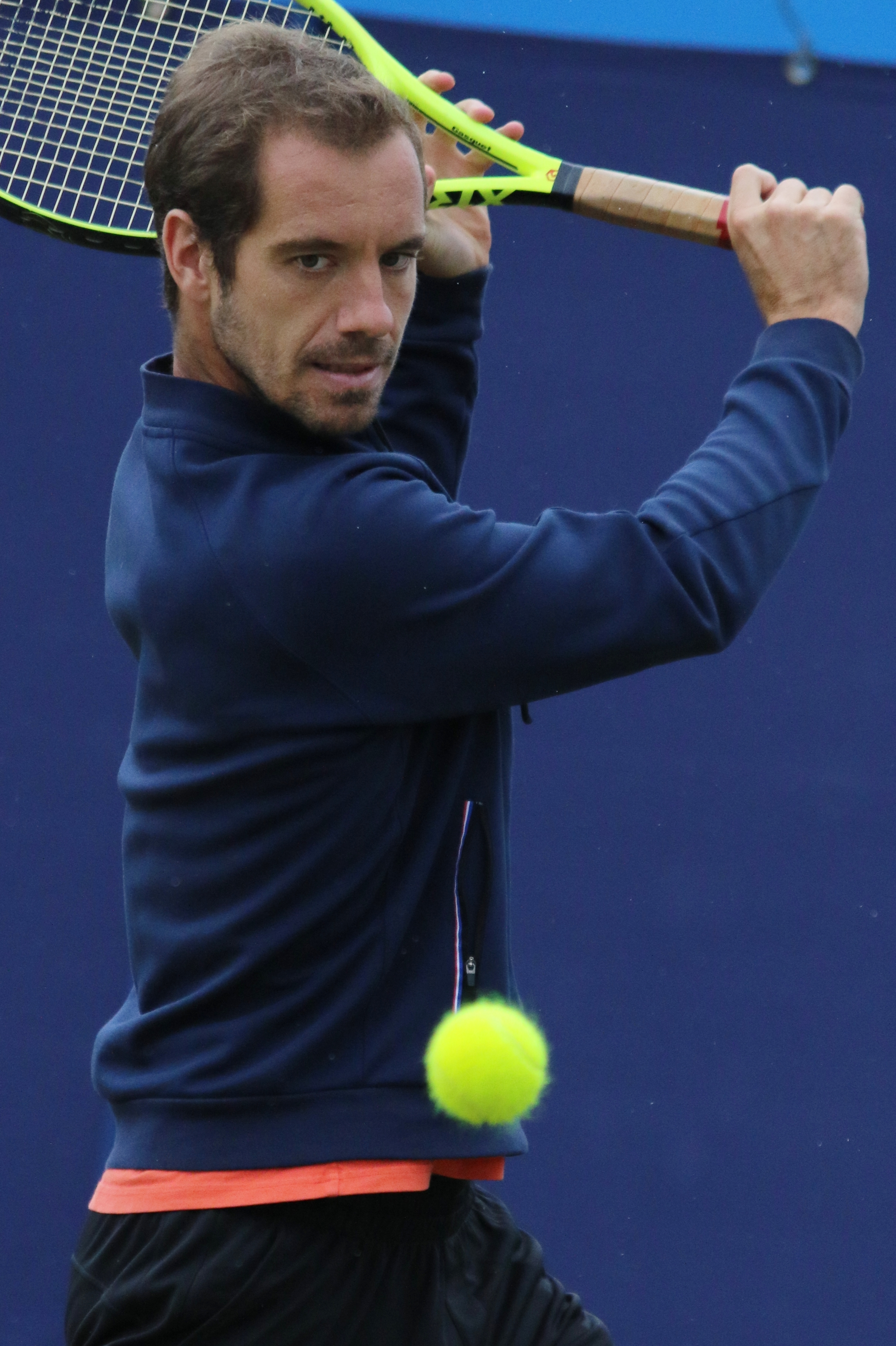
Gasquet at the 2017 Eastbourne

Gasquet stated that it was his goal to return to the top ten of the ATP singles rankings in 2017. He also stated he wanted to achieve greater success at the bigger tournaments, which he defined as the Grand Slam events and the Davis Cup (rather than the Masters 1000 tournaments). He started the year at the Hopman Cup, where he won both his singles and doubles matches, securing a victory for France over their opponents Germany. In France's next match, Gasquet once again delivered winning both his matches (singles and mixed doubles) to ensure France's defeat of Great Britain. However, that meant Gasquet would have to play Roger Federer of Switzerland, whom he had lost to on numerous occasions in the past. Predictably, Gasquet lost to Federer in straight sets, the first set being a 6–1 annihilation, however due to Mladenovic's victory over Bencic and Mladenovic and Gasquet's victory over Federer and Bencic in the mixed doubles, France progressed through to the final where they faced the United States. France defeated the United States in the final, after Gasquet and Mladenovic pulled off the decisive victory in the mixed doubles.

Gasquet then played at the Australian Open where he lost in the third round to Grigor Dimitrov in straight sets. That match had the honour of being the latest starting match in the history of the Australian Open with a start time of 11.58pm. Gasquet won his singles rubber against Taro Daniel in France's Davis Cup World Group 4-1 first round win over Japan. In early February, Gasquet was beaten in the singles final of the Open Sud de France by Alexander Zverev in straight sets. Gasquet was forced to miss the first three ATP Masters 1000 tournaments of the year (Indian Wells, Miami and Monte-Carlo), following appendicitis surgery. He missed the next two ATP Masters 1000 tournaments (Madrid and Rome) due to back injury. Gasquet's best singles results from mid-February to the end of June were in ATP World Tour tournaments in Marseille, Halle and Eastbourne, losing in the singles semifinals of all three of them.

Gasquet started the second half of the year badly, losing in the singles first round at Wimbledon and the US Open, and the singles second round in Montreal and Cincinnati. He squandered three match points to the eventual singles champion Alexander Zverev in the second round of the ATP Masters 1000 Montreal tournament. In September, he played on the ATP Challenger Tour for the first time since 2010, at the tournament in Szczecin, where he won the ninth ATP Challenger Tour singles title of his career. In October, he lost in the singles quarterfinals of three tournaments - Tokyo, Shanghai and Vienna.

Gasquet helped France win the 2017 Davis Cup by winning (he was paired with Pierre-Hugues Herbert) the doubles match in the final against Belgium.

=== 2018: 500th career singles win, injury and out of Davis Cup final ===
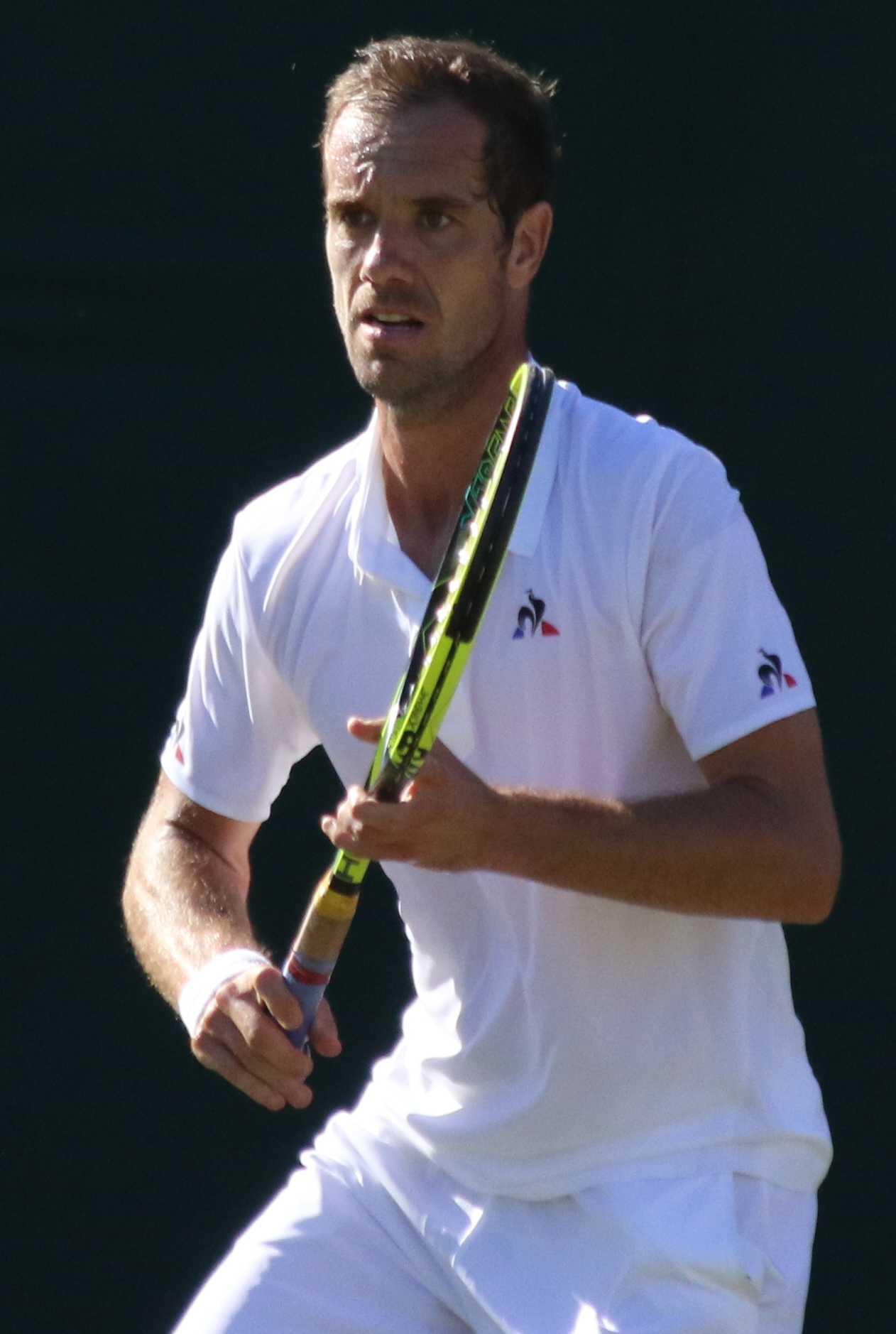
Gasquet at the 2018 Wimbledon Championships

Gasquet played his first tournament of the year in Doha. Seeded No. 5, he defeated Víctor Estrella Burgos in the first round before losing to qualifier Stefanos Tsitsipas in the second round. He lost in the singles third round of the Australian Open to Roger Federer in straight sets, his ninth consecutive loss to Federer. In the 2018 Davis Cup World Group first round tie against the Netherlands, he beat Robin Haase in four sets in the second singles rubber to level the score at 1-1; France won the tie 3–1. In February, Gasquet reached the singles final of the Open Sud de France for the sixth consecutive year, where he was defeated by his countryman Lucas Pouille in straight sets. Gasquet lost his opening singles matches in his next three tournaments - Rotterdam, Dubai and Miami. On 2 April, he dropped to world no. 38 in the ATP singles rankings - his lowest since being world No. 38 on 6 September 2010.

Gasquet ended his run of four consecutive singles defeats at the Grand Prix Hassan II, where he was beaten in the semifinals by Kyle Edmund. At the Monte-Carlo Masters, Gasquet recorded his 500th ATP Tour career main draw singles victory with a third-round win over Mischa Zverev. He became the first Frenchman in the Open era and only the eighth active player to achieve that milestone. He was defeated by Alexander Zverev (Mischa Zverev's younger brother) in the quarterfinals, despite winning the first set. Gasquet won only one singles match (in Madrid) in his next three tournaments - Budapest, Madrid and Rome. He lost in the third round of the French Open to Rafael Nadal 3–6, 2–6, 2–6, to fall to a 0–16 match record against Nadal. Gasquet won his 15th ATP career singles title and his third one on grass at the Libéma Open in the Netherlands with a 6–3, 7–6 win over Jérémy Chardy. He lost in the singles first round in Halle and at Wimbledon.

In mid-July, Gasquet reached his third ATP singles final of the year at the Swedish Open where he lost to Fabio Fognini in three sets. At the German Open in the following week, Gasquet (seeded No. 7) defeated Benoît Paire in the first round before he was forced to withdraw from his second round match against Nicolás Jarry because of injury to his abductors.

In Tokyo, No. 8 seed Gasquet defeated No. 2 seed Kevin Anderson in the quarterfinals before losing to No. 3 seed Kei Nishikori in the semifinals. At the tournament in Antwerp held in mid-October, Gasquet reached his sixth and final ATP World Tour singles semifinal of the year; he lost his semifinal match to Kyle Edmund in straight sets. Gasquet played his last tournament of 2018 at the Paris Masters where he lost in the second round to No. 16 seed Jack Sock 3–6, 3–6. On 12 November, he withdrew from the Davis Cup World Group final against Croatia that was to be held at the Stade Pierre-Mauroy on 23–25 November due to injury.

=== 2019: Hernia surgery, Cincinnati semifinal ===
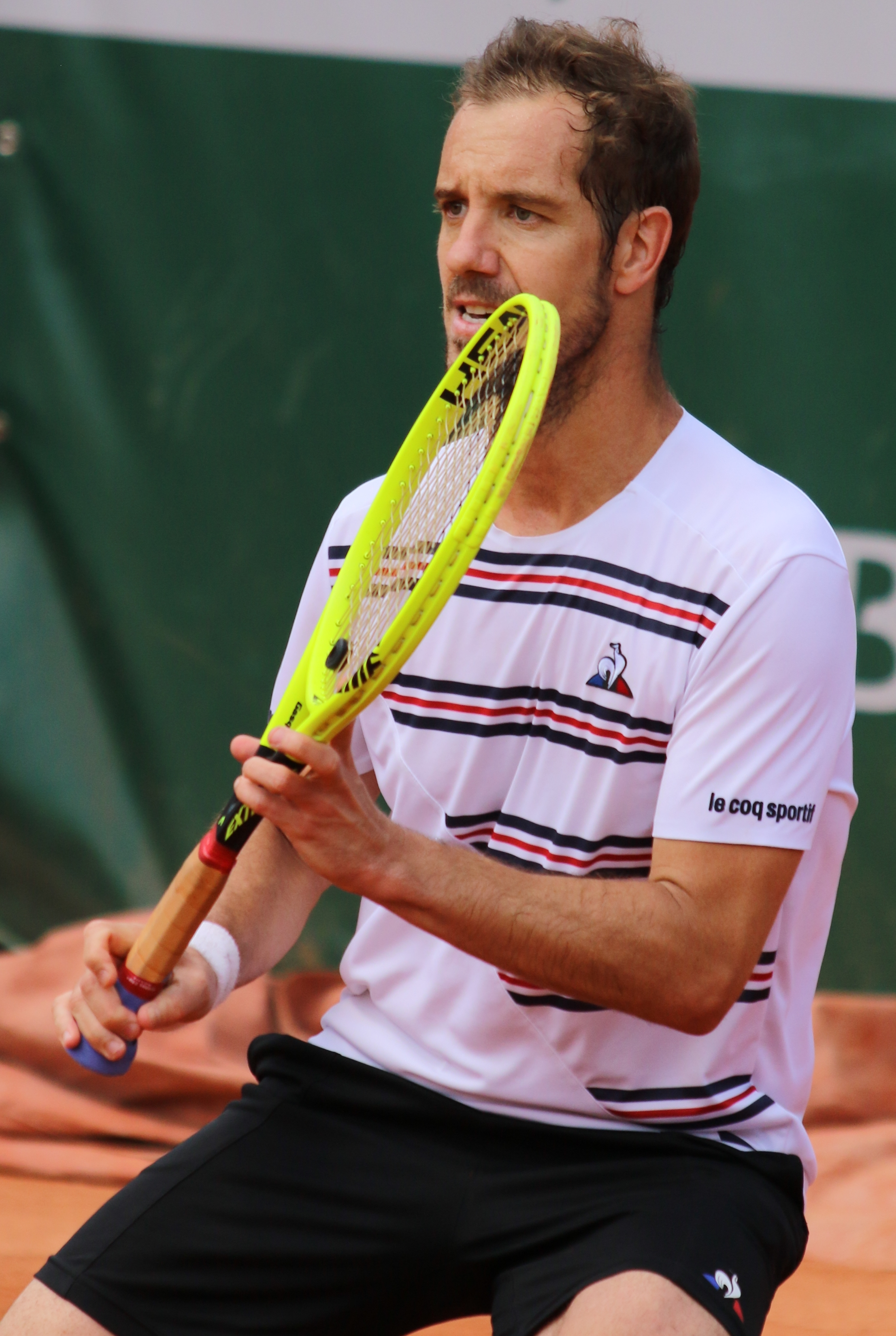
Gasquet at the 2019 French Open

Gasquet underwent groin hernia surgery on 18 January. The recovery process was expected to last for two months.

Gasquet played his first tournament of the year on the international circuit at the Madrid Open, where he defeated the Spanish wild card Alejandro Davidovich Fokina in his first match (in the main draw first round) before losing his second round match against the No. 4 seed Roger Federer.

Entering using a Protected Ranking, Gasquet reached the semifinals of Cincinnati, defeating Andy Murray (who received a wildcard into the main draw), lucky loser Federico Delbonis, and Diego Schwartzman, all in straight sets, then defeating 11th seed Roberto Bautista Agut in 3 sets before losing to David Goffin 3–6, 4–6.

Gasquet lost in the first round of the US Open to eventual semifinalist Matteo Berrettini in 4 sets.

=== 2020: Inconsistencies ===
Richard Gasquet began his season by playing in the 2020 Open Sud de France in Montpellier. He reached the quarterfinals, but retired in the second set against Canadian Vasek Pospisil.

After playing in the 2020 Open 13, and the 2020 Dubai Tennis Championships, (where he reached the quarterfinal), Gasquet's season was paused due to the COVID-19 pandemic and subsequent shutdown of the ATP Tour.

Gasquet returned in August at the 2020 Western & Southern Open. After that, he played at the 2020 US Open. He reached the second round after beating Ivo Karlovic, but losing to Alex De Minaur. At the US Open, Gasquet had to follow stricter COVID-19 protocols, due to being in close contact with a player who tested positive.

=== 2021: 550th win, first final in three years ===
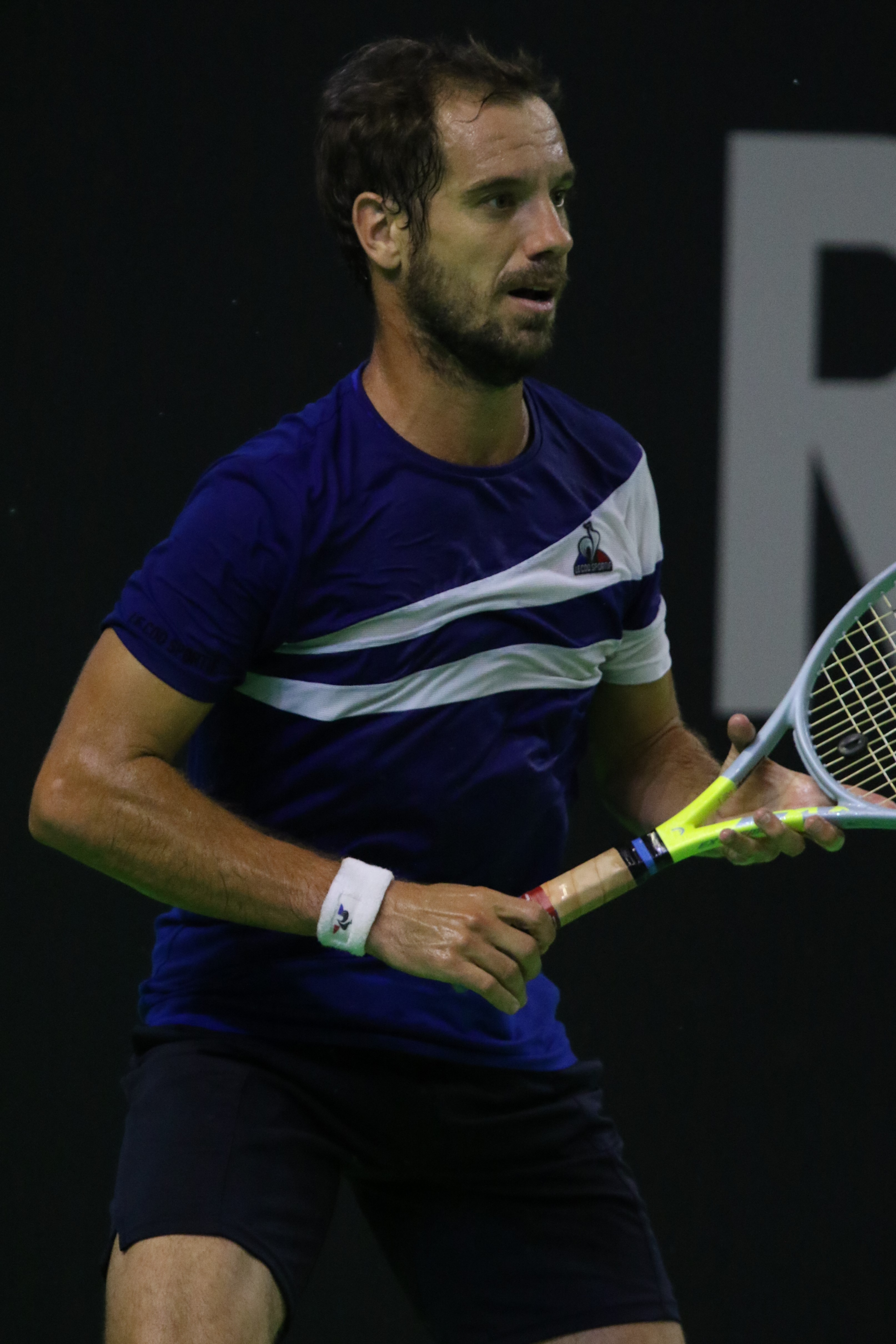
Gasquet at the 2021 Open de Rennes

Gasquet began his season with a first round loss at the Murray River Open against Mackenzie McDonald. He got his first win at the Qatar Open against Blaž Rola in straight sets to play world No. 8 Andrey Rublev in the next round but withdrew due to injury. In March at the Dubai Open, Gasquet recorded his 550th win against Marco Cecchinato in the first round. With the win, he became one of only five active players to have over 550 wins.

In May, Gasquet made back-to-back quarterfinals at the Lyon Open (losing to Karen Khachanov) and the Emilia-Romagna Open (losing to Jaume Munar). In Lyon, he defeated world number 10 Diego Schwartzman to claim his first win over a top-10 player in almost two years.

At the French Open he lost to world No. 3 Rafael Nadal in the second round. At the Wimbledon Championships, he lost to world No. 8 Roger Federer also in the second round.

At the Croatia Open in Umag, Gasquet made his first final in over three years. He won against Alessandro Giannessi, Damir Džumhur and Daniel Altmaier before losing to Spaniard Carlos Alcaraz in the finals.

=== 2022: Second top-2 win since 2005 ===
At the 2022 Geneva Open Gasquet defeated top seed and World No. 2 Daniil Medvedev in the second round in straight sets. It was Gasquet's first win over an opponent ranked in the top two of the rankings since he defeated then-World No. 1 Roger Federer in the quarterfinals at the 2005 Monte Carlo Masters. With this win, Gasquet has now beaten a player in every slot between no. 1 and 100 on the ATP Tour. In the quarterfinals, he beat Kamil Majchrzak in straight sets before losing in the semifinals to João Sousa.

At Roland Garros Richard won the first round by beating Lloyd Harris in straight sets, before losing in the second round to the 27th seed Sebastian Korda.

With his participation at the 2022 Wimbledon Championships as of 27 June 2022, he was in 5th place on the list of Grand Slam appearances overall with 67, tied with Andreas Seppi. He made the third round of Wimbledon defeating Joao Sousa in five sets and Mackenzie McDonald. He also made the third round at the US Open where he recorded his 68th participation at a Major, tied with Novak Djokovic and Philipp Kohlschreiber.

=== 2023: Auckland title, French No. 1, 600th career win ===
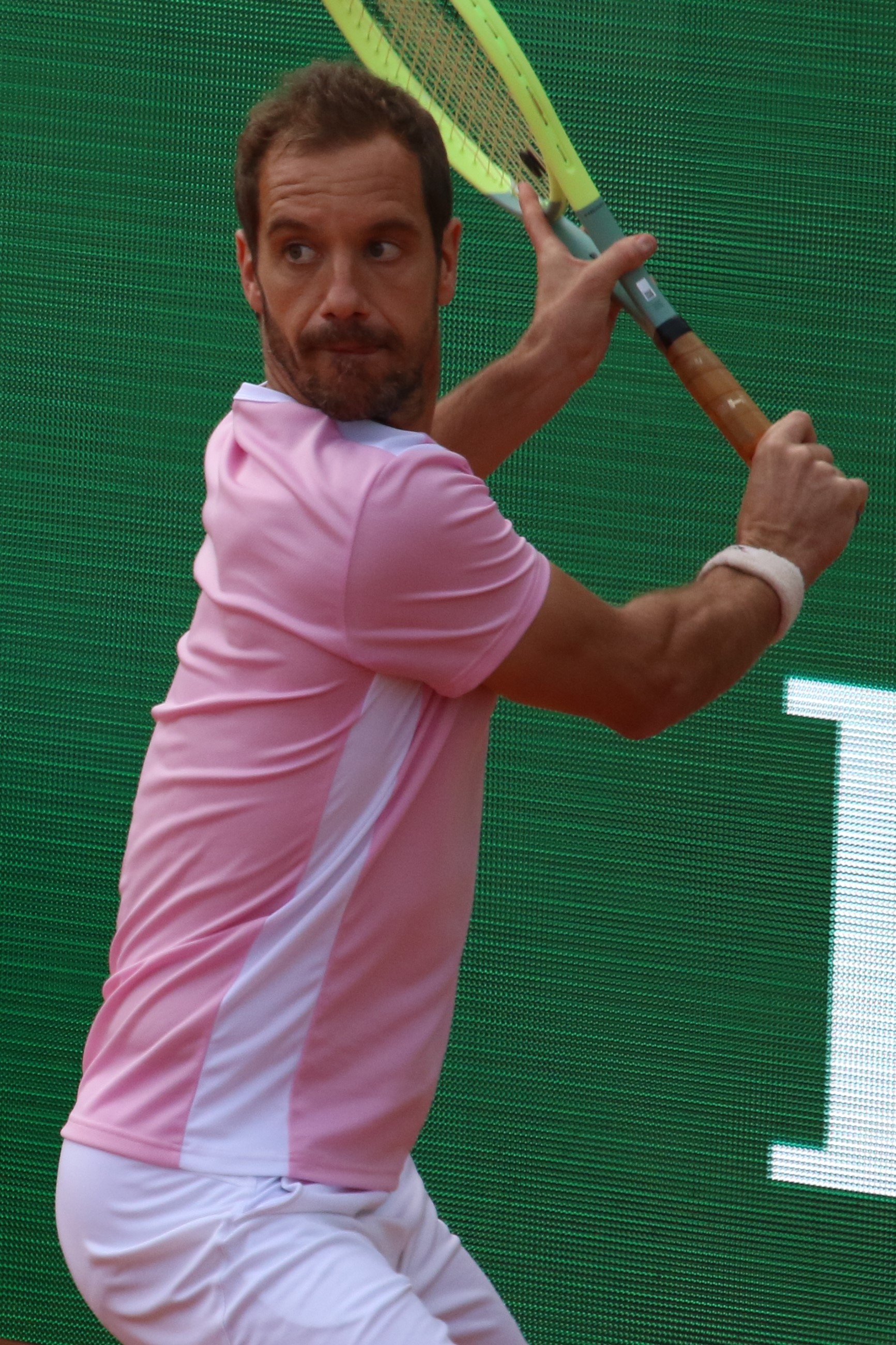
Gasquet at the 2023 Monte-Carlo Masters

In January, ranked No. 67 Gasquet reached the final of ASB Classic by beating Kiranpal Pannu in straight sets in the first round, João Sousa in the second round in straight sets again, David Goffin in the quarterfinals in three sets, before Constant Lestienne pulled out before their semifinal match, allowing Gasquet to participate in his 33rd career ATP singles final. He then defeated Cameron Norrie in three sets in the final. It was his 16th ATP title and the first in almost five years since 2018. At 36 years, 6 months and 27 days, he became the oldest French player in the Open Era to win a title. With this result, Gasquet moved 25 positions up to get back to the top 50, becoming the French No. 1 player in the singles rankings at No. 42 on 16 January 2023.

He participated in his 69th Grand Slam at the 2023 Australian Open moving into 4th place tied with Djokovic and Mikhail Youzhny. At the Rotterdam Open he recorded his 350th hard court career win over Pablo Carreno Busta. He participated at the premiere 175 level Challenger, the 2023 Arizona Tennis Classic.

At the 2023 French Open he recorded his 70th Grand Slam participation tied for third place with Djokovic and compatriot Fabrice Santoro and 20th total at this Major where he lost to compatriot Arthur Rinderknech. He shared his desire that he would like to participate one more time and possibly retire at Roland Garros in 2024.

At the 2023 BOSS Open he recorded his 600th career win over top seed and wildcard Stefanos Tsitsipas, his 11th career top 5 win, becoming the fourth active player to reach the milestone, joining Rafael Nadal (1,068 wins), Novak Djokovic (1,058 wins) and Andy Murray (725 wins). He was also the first French player to accomplish this feat.

At the 2023 Wimbledon Championships he recorded his 71st Grand Slam participation tied with Novak Djokovic and Fernando Verdasco, and only behind Roger Federer and Feliciano Lopez, and his 72nd at the US Open.

He finished the year ranked No. 76 making it 19 straight years in the top 100 since 2005.

=== 2024–2025: 1000th match played, 75th major participation and retirement at Roland Garros ===
At the 2024 ASB Classic where Gasquet was the defending champion, he lost to teenager and compatriot Arthur Fils which ended his 956 weeks in the top 100, the longest active streak since April 2005.

At the 2024 Australian Open, in his 73rd Major participation (tied with Djokovic), Gasquet lost in the first round to second seed Carlos Alcaraz in straight sets.

At the age of 37, in Manama, Bahrain he played in the second oldest ATP Challenger Tour final, only behind the 2018 Monterrey Challenger title match in which David Ferrer (at the age of 36) defeated Ivo Karlović (at the age of 39) and was gunning to become the fifth oldest Challenger champion but lost to 36 years old Mikhail Kukushkin.

At the 2024 Țiriac Open Gasquet was supposed to play his 1000th career match against Federico Coria joining active players Djokovic, Nadal and Verdasco in accomplishing this feat, but withdrew late from the tournament, having received a wildcard for the main draw. He qualified for the main draw at the 2024 Mutua Madrid Open and played his 1000th career match at the ATP tour-level against Lorenzo Sonego.

In his 74th Grand Slam participation at the 2024 French Open where he received a wildcard, he defeated Borna Ćorić in the first round.

Following winning his tenth ATP Challenger title and first since 2017, at the 2024 Cassis Open Provence, Gasquet became the third oldest champion ever (at the age of 38) on the ATP Challenger Tour, after Ivo Karlović and Fernando Verdasco.

He received wildcards for the 2025 Țiriac Open where he defeated Botic van de Zandschulp and for the 2025 Monte-Carlo Masters.

Gasquet announced his retirement from tennis on 10 October 2024, with his last appearance scheduled to be at the 2025 French Open. In May 2025, in the first round of Roland Garros, Gasquet won against the 23-year-old French compatriot Terence Atmane. With his win, Gasquet became the first French player in the Open Era to win a singles main draw match at Roland-Garros after having turned 38 years old. He recorded his 117th Grand Slam win, which is third of all-time among Frenchmen. Gasquet, who first played the main draw on the Parisian clay in 2002, was making his 75th Grand Slam appearance, which ranked fourth of all time. In the second round, Gasquet lost to the world No. 1 and top seed Jannik Sinner. He ended his career after spending 19 consecutive years inside the top 100, 16 ATP titles and the most wins (610) among Frenchmen in the Open Era.

Although he announced his retirement in May, Gasquet participated at the 2025 Hopman Cup, representing France and replacing Arthur Fils, who withdrew on 1 July 2025.

== Playing style and coaching ==
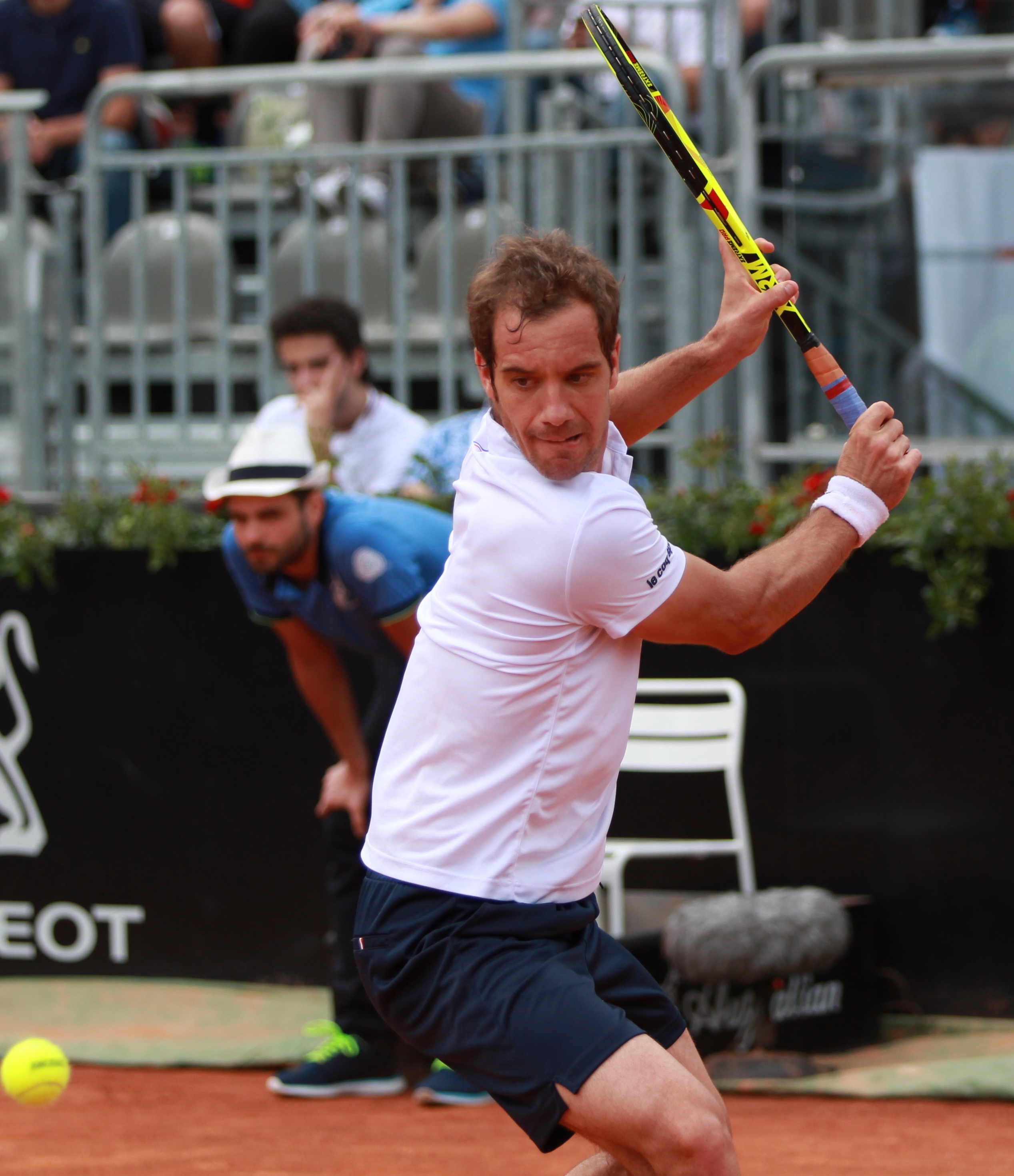
Gasquet swinging a backhand

Gasquet is an all-court player, known for his complete and elegant game as well as his single-handed backhand, which is considered to be one of the best ever. His forehand is his weaker wing, and is generally less consistent and slower. For his forehand, he uses a semi-western to Eastern grip with an unusually long take-back. However, upon contact, he hits the ball flat with an eastern grip while flicking his wrist, seemingly combining flat and topspin strokes together. It is due to this that his forehand is sometimes considered "awkward" and less effective.

Gasquet's single-handed backhand is considered one of the most graceful, efficient and effective backhands ever. Like his forehand, he winds up very far backwards with a big circular take-back, with his left hand supporting the take-back. Upon release, he flicks his wrist and produces a large follow-through and finish, often above the head, due to the need to impart extreme topspin.

Executing a signature style of top-spin single-handed backhands. Gasquet's backhand was known for its consistency, speed and accuracy, and has been acclaimed by many past players and commentators including Robbie Koenig, John McEnroe and Brad Gilbert. His ability to create pace and angles with it, from anywhere on the base line, coupled with the amount of top-spin he used produced problems for numerous players.

Gasquet has shown versatility in returning difficult shots to his backhand with various methods, whether by slice, topspin angles, or heavy power. He is also capable of hitting flat returns on high top-spin shots directed to that wing, a shot most single-handed backhand players struggle with.

Despite Gasquet's strengths, he also has a few prominent weaknesses, which could be argued are entirely responsible for his lack of success in big tournaments and against top 10 opponents. His first weakness is despite his strength and aggressive potential, he sometimes does not actively seek out winners from his groundstrokes and mainly waits for his opponent to show signs of aggression before replying with his own. He also generally plays far behind the baseline, which supports the slow buildup on his ground-strokes, but leaves him susceptible to drop-shots and angled shots. This aspect of his game in particular has been lamented by his fans around the globe, who see him as being too set in his ways to change this aspect of his approach to the detriment of his results against the best players in the world, who can easily take advantage of it. Indeed, his baseline groundstrokes have previously been characterised as toothless. His serve is also not especially strong, being known more for spin rather than speed.

His coaches were: Éric Deblicker (2004–2008, 2009–2011), Guillaume Peyre (2008–2009), Gabriel Markus (2010), Riccardo Piatti (2011–2013),Sébastien Grosjean (2011–2016), Sergi Bruguera (2014–2017), Thierry Tulasne & Fabrice Santoro (2018), Thierry Ascione (2018–2020), and Julien Cassaigne (2020–2025).

== Equipment ==
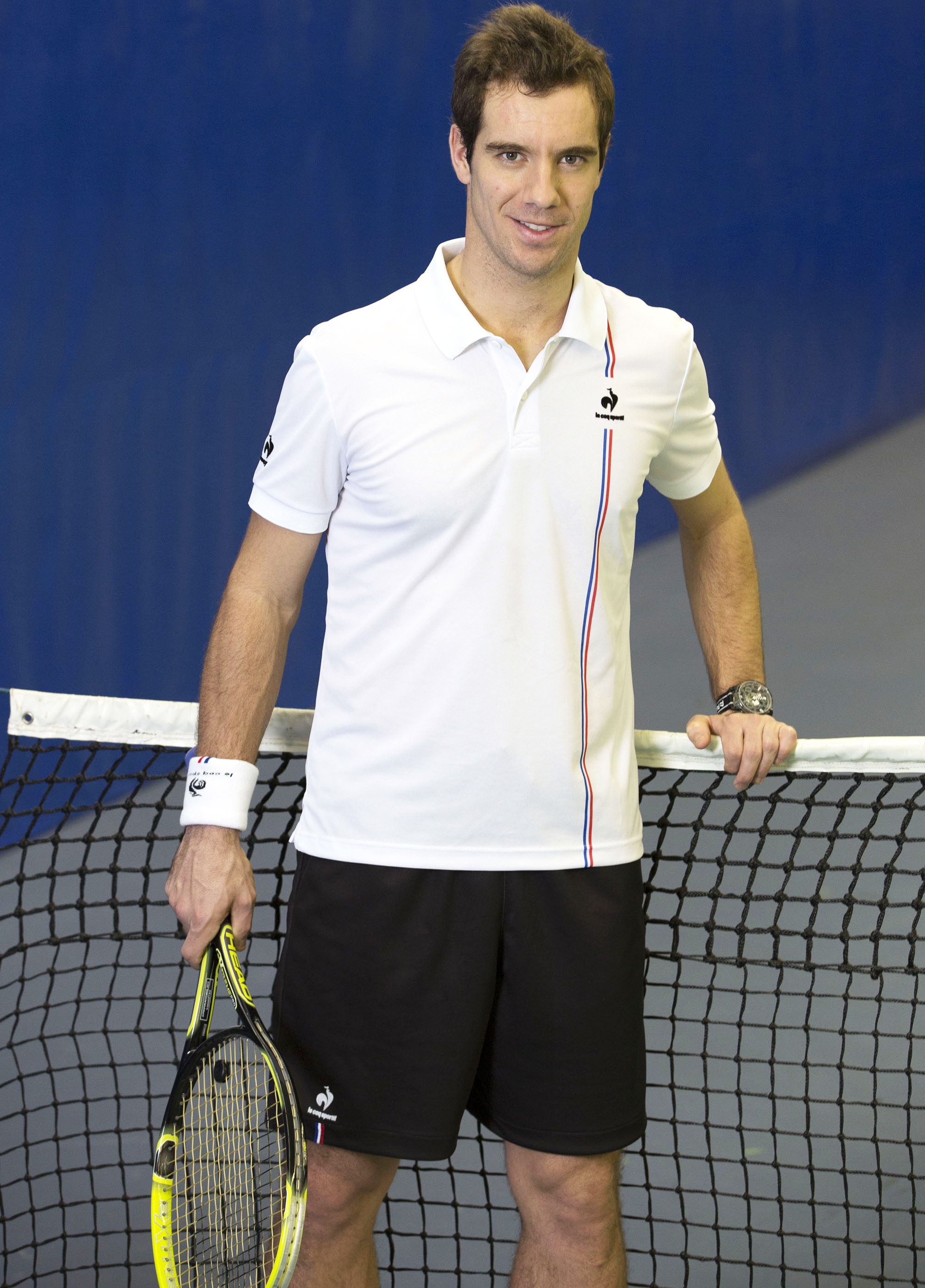
Gasquet at the Le Coq Sportif photoshoot in December 2013

Gasquet currently endorses the Head Graphene Extreme Pro. For his overgrip, he uses the Tourna Grip, which he double grips at only the bottom half of his racquet's handle, since he hits his backhand with one hand. Like many professional players, his racquet bears the paint job of the current Extreme line for endorsement purposes. Underneath the paint is a pro-stock model Head Liquidmetal Instinct Tour XL. He has used the Instinct since 2004. His racquet is strung with Luxilon Big Banger Original 16 string. He wore Lacoste clothing for many years before switching to Le Coq Sportif in 2014. His shoe of choice is from Asics. He also has Lagardère Tags on his sleeves.

== Personal life ==
Gasquet has launched the Richard Gasquet Foundation which aims to use sport as a means to bring underprivileged children back to health and help them build a future. He is a big rugby fan, supporting his hometown team Béziers. He has stated in an interview that if he were not a tennis player he would probably be a rugby player. He is also a fan of football and supports his local team Montpellier as well as Paris St-Germain. He has described basketball player Tony Parker, who played in the NBA, as a very good and genuine friend. His favourite cuisine is Italian.

== Career statistics ==
=== Grand Slam singles tournament performance timeline ===
Key
W	F	SF	QF	#R	RR	Q#	DNQ	A	NH

(W) winner; (F) finalist; (SF) semifinalist; (QF) quarterfinalist; (#R) rounds 4, 3, 2, 1; (RR) round-robin stage; (Q#) qualification round; (DNQ) did not qualify; (A) absent; (NH) not held; (SR) strike rate (events won / competed); (W–L) win–loss record.
To avoid confusion and double counting, these charts are updated at the conclusion of a tournament or when the player's participation has ended.

Tournament	2002	2003	2004	2005	2006	2007	2008	2009	2010	2011	2012	2013	2014	2015	2016	2017	2018	2019	2020	2021	2022	2023	2024	2025	SR	W–L	Win%
Australian Open	A	1R	1R	A	1R	4R	4R	3R	1R	3R	4R	4R	3R	3R	A	3R	3R	A	A	A	2R	1R	1R	Q1	0 / 17	25–17	60%
French Open	1R	1R	1R	3R	2R	2R	A	A	1R	4R	4R	4R	3R	4R	QF	3R	3R	2R	1R	2R	2R	1R	2R	2R	0 / 22	31–22	58%
Wimbledon	A	A	1R	4R	1R	SF	4R	A	A	4R	4R	3R	2R	SF	4R	1R	1R	1R	NH	2R	3R	1R	Q3	A	0 / 17	31–17	65%
US Open	Q2	A	Q1	4R	4R	2R*	1R	1R	4R	2R	4R	SF	3R	QF	1R	1R	3R	1R	2R	1R	3R	1R	Q2	A	0 / 19	30–18	63%
Win–loss	0–1	0–2	0–3	8–3	4–4	10–3	6–3	2–2	3–3	9–4	12–4	13–4	7–4	14–4	7–3	4–4	6–4	1–3	1–2	2–3	6–4	0–4	1–2	1–1	0 / 75	117–74	61%

*Gasquet withdrew from the 2007 US Open due to illness, having won his opening round.

=== Mixed doubles: 1 (1 title) ===
Result	Year	Championship	Surface	Partner	Opponents	Score
Win	2004	French Open	Clay	(France) Tatiana Golovin	(Zimbabwe) Cara Black (Zimbabwe) Wayne Black	6–3, 6–4

== Olympic games ==
=== Doubles: 1 (1 bronze medal) ===
Result	Year	Championship	Surface	Partner	Opponents	Score
Bronze	2012	London Olympics	Grass	(France) Julien Benneteau	(Spain) David Ferrer (Spain) Feliciano López	7–6^{(7–4)}, 6–2
