= Riccardo Piatti =

Italian tennis coach (born 1958)

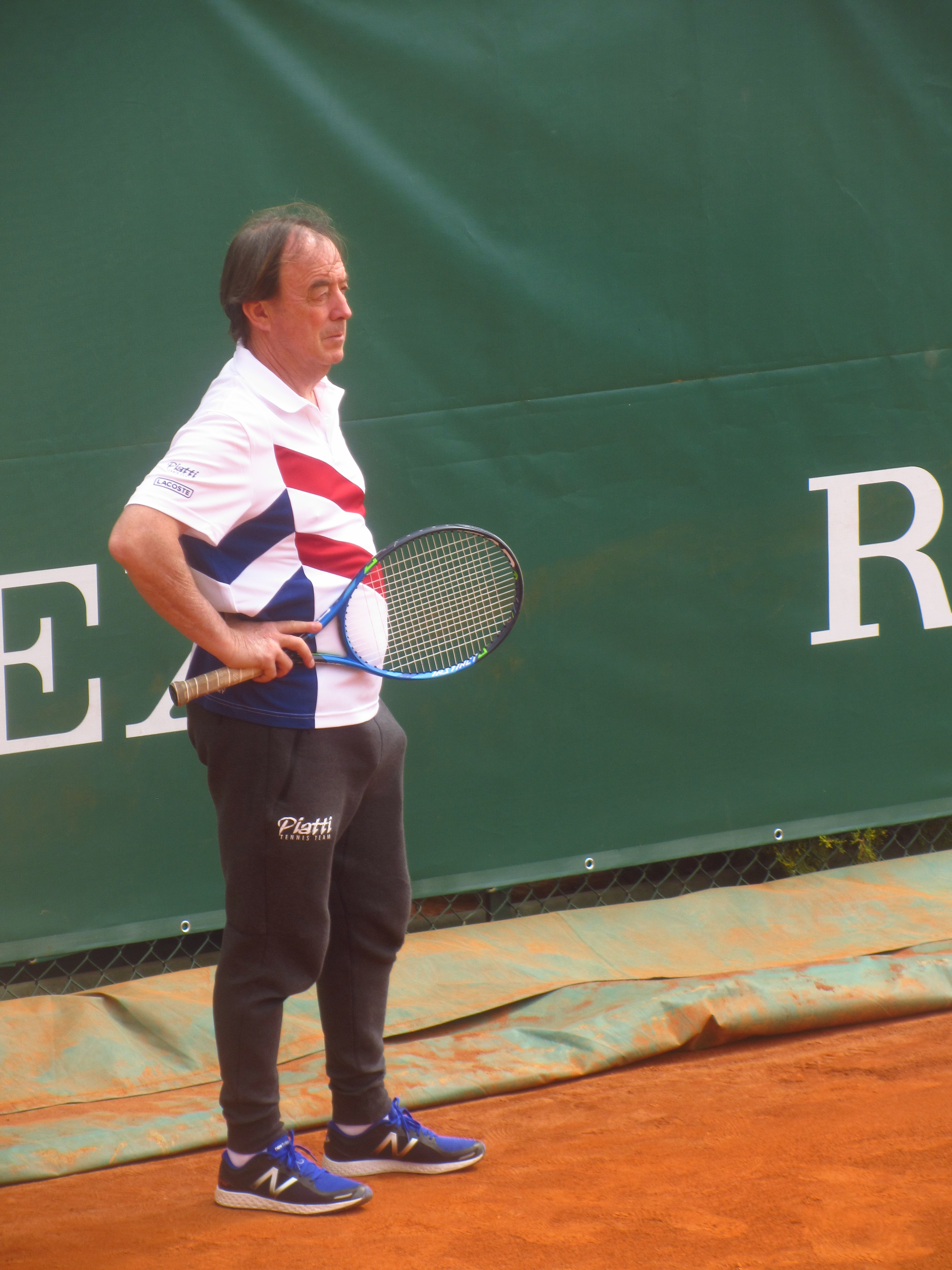
Riccardo Piatti

Riccardo Piatti (born 8 November 1958) is an Italian tennis coach. He has coached several players who have been ranked in the top 10 by the Association of Tennis Professionals (ATP) including Novak Djokovic, Ivan Ljubičić, Richard Gasquet, Milos Raonic, and Jannik Sinner.

== Early life ==
Piatti began playing tennis at the age of nine at the tennis club of Villa d'Este in Cernobbio, Lombardia in Italy. He first had the idea of becoming a tennis coach when he was 20; at the time the head coach of the Villa d'Este Country Club had an injury and Piatti was asked to replace him.

In his 20s he learned to coach from Nick Bollettieri at the Nick Bollettieri Tennis Academy (which has been absorbed into the IMG Academy), in Bradenton, Florida.

Riccardo's sister, Carolina, is also a tennis instructor.

== Coaching career ==
Piatti began as a private coach for professional players in 1988 including early players he coached: Renzo Furlan (career-high world No. 19), Cristiano Caratti (career-high world No. 26), and Omar Camporese (career-high world No. 18). Piatti began working with Ivan Ljubičić in June 1997, when Ljubičić was ranked No. 954 in the world. This relationship lasted until the end of Ljubičić's professional playing career in 2012. Ljubičić was ranked worldwide as high as No. 3, his career high, while Piatti was his coach. From fall 2005 until June 2006, Piatti coached Novak Djokovic when Djokovic was 18. Djokovic parted ways with him due to Piatti's refusal to work full-time with him.

In 2011, Piatti claimed that he knew then (in 2006) that Djokovic "could become number one in the world and a player on the level of Rafael Nadal and Roger Federer because Djokovic always worked hard as a child, with his family, and he was very focused and determined to be world number one. In February 2011, while still coaching world No. 14 Ljubičić, Piatti began to co-coach Richard Gasquet (with Sébastien Grosjean), who was then ranked No. 31 in the world. With Piatti, Gasquet improved to a high ranking of world No. 9, short of his career high No. 7, which he achieved in 2007. Piatti abruptly ended the relationship in November 2013 during the season-ending 2013 ATP World Tour Finals.

On 1 December 2013 Piatti began working with Milos Raonic, co-coaching with Piatti's former student Ivan Ljubičić. At that time, Raonic held an ATP world ranking of No. 11. With Piatti, his ranking rose to a career-high of No. 3. Piatti coached Borna Ćorić from 2017 till September 2019. Coric cited one of the main reasons for the split was that Maria Sharapova, a Grand Slam champion five times, also started working with Piatti in 2019. Sharapova and Piatti announced on November 8, 2019, that they would work together in 2020.

Piatti was the coach of Jannik Sinner, the 2019 #NextGenATP Finals champion, until February 2022. Piatti is involved with tennis schools, club teams, and summer's clinics on Elba, an island in Italy.
