= 2011 Open 13 – Singles =

Singles
- 2011 Open 13

Final
- Champion: (Sweden) Robin Söderling
- Runner-up: (Croatia) Marin Čilić
- Score: 6–7^{(8–10)}, 6–3, 6–3

Details
- Draw: 28 (4 Q / 3 WC )
- Seeds: 8

Events
Singles	Doubles
← 2010 ·	Open 13	· 2012 →

Michaël Llodra was the defending champion, but he lost in quarterfinals to Robin Söderling. Söderling reached the final, where he defeated Marin Čilić 6–7^{(8–10)}, 6–3, 6–3 to claim his third title of the year and ninth of his career.

== Seeds ==
The top four seeds received a bye into the second round.

1. (Sweden) Robin Söderling (champion)
2. (Czech Republic) Tomáš Berdych (quarterfinals)
3. (Russia) Mikhail Youzhny (semifinal)
4. (Austria) Jürgen Melzer (quarterfinals)
5. (Croatia) Ivan Ljubičić (second round)
6. (France) Jo-Wilfried Tsonga (quarterfinals)
7. (Latvia) Ernests Gulbis (first round)
8. (France) Michaël Llodra (quarterfinals)

== Draw ==
=== Key ===
- Q = Qualifier
- WC = Wild card
- LL = Lucky loser
- Alt = Alternate
- SE = Special exempt
- PR = Protected ranking
- ITF = ITF entry
- JE = Junior exempt
- w/o = Walkover
- r = Retired
- d = Defaulted
- SR = Special ranking

=== Finals ===
Semifinals
1	(Sweden) Robin Söderling	7	6
PR	(Russia) Dmitry Tursunov	5	1
3	(Russia) Mikhail Youzhny	2	6	5
(Croatia) Marin Čilić	6	1	7

Final
1	(Sweden) Robin Söderling	6^{8}	6	6
(Croatia) Marin Čilić	7	3	3

=== Top half ===
First round
WC	(France) N Mahut	6	6
Q	(Russia) A Kumantsov	2	0
Q	(Netherlands) T Schoorel	0	2
(Germany) T Kamke	6	6
(France) J Benneteau	4	6	3
8	(France) M Llodra	6	4	6
(Netherlands) R Haase	7	4	6^{2}
(Italy) A Seppi	5	6	7
WC	(Bulgaria) G Dimitrov	7	5	6^{4}
PR	(Russia) D Tursunov	6^{8}	7	7
(Kazakhstan) A Golubev	2	4
5	(Croatia) I Ljubičić	6	6

Second round
1	(Sweden) R Söderling	7	7
WC	(France) N Mahut	6^{8}	6^{5}
(Germany) T Kamke	3	4
8	(France) M Llodra	6	6
4	(Austria) J Melzer	7	6
(Italy) A Seppi	5	3
PR	(Russia) D Tursunov	7	6
5	(Croatia) I Ljubičić	6^{4}	3

Quarterfinals
1	(Sweden) R Söderling	6	6
8	(France) M Llodra	1	4
4	(Austria) J Melzer	4	6	1
PR	(Russia) D Tursunov	6	2	6

Semifinals
1	(Sweden) R Söderling	7	6
PR	(Russia) D Tursunov	5	1

=== Bottom half ===
First round
6	(France) J-W Tsonga	6	6
WC	(France) B Paire	1	2
(Ukraine) I Marchenko	4	3
(Ukraine) S Stakhovsky	6	6
(Russia) N Davydenko	6^{6}	4
(France) G Simon	7	6
7	(Latvia) E Gulbis	6^{2}	1
(Germany) P Petzschner	7	6
(Croatia) M Čilić	6^{6}	6	6
Q	(Switzerland) S Bohli	7	3	2
(France) A Clément	3	2
Q	(France) É Roger-Vasselin	6	6

Second round
6	(France) J-W Tsonga	5	6	6
(Ukraine) S Stakhovsky	7	4	2
(France) G Simon	6	3	3
3	(Russia) M Youzhny	3	6	6
(Germany) P Petzschner	6^{3}	3
(Croatia) M Čilić	7	6
Q	(France) É Roger-Vasselin	3	4
2	(Czech Republic) T Berdych	6	6

Quarterfinals
6	(France) J-W Tsonga	4	6	4
3	(Russia) M Youzhny	6	2	6
(Croatia) M Čilić	6	6
2	(Czech Republic) T Berdych	3	4

Semifinals
3	(Russia) M Youzhny	2	6	5
(Croatia) M Čilić	6	1	7
