= 2009 Open 13 – Singles =

Singles
- 2009 Open 13

Final
- Champion: (France) Jo-Wilfried Tsonga
- Runner-up: (France) Michaël Llodra
- Score: 7–5, 7–6^{(7–3)}

Details
- Draw: 32 (4 Q / 2 WC )
- Seeds: 8

Events
Singles	Doubles
← 2008 ·	Open 13	· 2010 →

Andy Murray was the defending champion, but chose not to participate that year.
Jo-Wilfried Tsonga won in the final 7–5, 7–6^{(7–3)}, against Michaël Llodra.

== Seeds ==
1. (Serbia) Novak Djokovic (semifinals)
2. (France) Gilles Simon (semifinals)
3. (France) Gaël Monfils (first round)
4. (France) Jo-Wilfried Tsonga (champion)
5. (Czech Republic) Tomáš Berdych (first round)
6. (France) Richard Gasquet (withdrew due to a right shoulder injury)
7. (Russia) Marat Safin (first round)
8. (Spain) Feliciano López (quarterfinals)

== Draw ==
=== Key ===
- Q = Qualifier
- WC = Wild card
- LL = Lucky loser
- Alt = Alternate
- SE = Special exempt
- PR = Protected ranking
- ITF = ITF entry
- JE = Junior exempt
- w/o = Walkover
- r = Retired
- d = Defaulted
- SR = Special ranking

=== Finals ===
Semifinals
1	(Serbia) Novak Djokovic	4	6^{1}
4	(France) Jo-Wilfried Tsonga	6	7^{7}
(France) Michaël Llodra	7^{7}	6
2	(France) Gilles Simon	6^{5}	2

Final
4	(France) Jo-Wilfried Tsonga	7	7^{7}
(France) Michaël Llodra	5	6^{3}

=== Top half ===
First round
1	(Serbia) N Djokovic	7^{7}	6
(France) J Chardy	6^{4}	4
(Czech Republic) J Hernych	6	3	6
(Belgium) K Vliegen	3	6	4
(Germany) M Zverev	6^{5}	6	6
Q	(Ukraine) I Marchenko	7^{7}	3	4
(France) A Clément	4	6	6
7/WC	(Russia) M Safin	6	3	2
4	(France) J-W Tsonga	7^{7}	6
(Kazakhstan) A Golubev	6^{5}	2
(Italy) S Bolelli	7^{7}	7^{7}
Q	(United Kingdom) R Bloomfield	6^{5}	6^{1}
(Russia) T Gabashvili	6	2	2
(Russia) D Tursunov	3	6	6
(Croatia) I Ljubičić	6	4	5
8	(Spain) F López	3	6	7

Second round
1	(Serbia) N Djokovic	7	6
(Czech Republic) J Hernych	5	4
(Germany) M Zverev	6	5	6
(France) A Clément	4	7	2
4	(France) J-W Tsonga	6	6
(Italy) S Bolelli	3	2
(Russia) D Tursunov	6^{4}	6^{1}
8	(Spain) F López	7^{7}	7^{7}

Quarterfinals
1	(Serbia) N Djokovic	6	6
(Germany) M Zverev	3	3
4	(France) J-W Tsonga	6	6^{1}	6
8	(Spain) F López	2	7^{7}	4

Semifinals
1	(Serbia) N Djokovic	4	6^{1}
4	(France) J-W Tsonga	6	7^{7}

=== Bottom half ===
First round
5	(Czech Republic) T Berdych	4	7^{7}	1
(Russia) M Youzhny	6	6^{2}	6
Q	(Poland) J Janowicz	6^{5}	6	6^{3}
(Italy) A Seppi	7^{7}	3	7^{7}
LL	(South Africa) R de Voest	6^{2}	1
(France) M Llodra	7^{7}	6
(France) P-H Mathieu	4	6	7
3	(France) G Monfils	6	4	5
LL	(Switzerland) G Bastl	6	6
(France) M Gicquel	4	3
(France) F Santoro	6	4	2
(France) J Benneteau	4	6	6
Q	(France) L Recouderc	1	4
(Germany) R Schüttler	6	6
WC	(Bulgaria) G Dimitrov	6	3	5
2	(France) G Simon	4	6	7

Second round
(Russia) M Youzhny	7^{7}	6
(Italy) A Seppi	6^{2}	3
(France) M Llodra	6	7^{7}
(France) P-H Mathieu	3	6^{1}
LL	(Switzerland) G Bastl	1	6	1
(France) J Benneteau	6	2	6
(Germany) R Schüttler	4	6	2
2	(France) G Simon	6	4	6

Quarterfinals
(Russia) M Youzhny	6^{4}	6^{3}
(France) M Llodra	7^{7}	7^{7}
(France) J Benneteau	2	4
2	(France) G Simon	6	6

Semifinals
(France) M Llodra	7^{7}	6
2	(France) G Simon	6^{5}	2

== Qualifying ==
=== Seeds ===
1. (Uzbekistan) Denis Istomin (second round)
2. (France) Adrian Mannarino (first round)
3. (Colombia) Santiago Giraldo (first round)
4. (South Africa) Rik de Voest (qualifying competition, lucky loser)
5. (Netherlands) Jesse Huta Galung (second round)
6. (Andorra) Laurent Recouderc (qualified)
7. (Colombia) Alejandro Falla (first round)
8. (France) Thierry Ascione (second round)

=== Qualifiers ===
1. (United Kingdom) Richard Bloomfield
2. (Andorra) Laurent Recouderc
3. (Poland) Jerzy Janowicz
4. (Ukraine) Illya Marchenko

=== Lucky loser ===
1. (South Africa) Rik de Voest
2. (Switzerland) George Bastl

=== Draw ===
==== First qualifier ====
First round
1	(Uzbekistan) Denis Istomin	6	6
(France) Jonathan Eysseric	3	1
(France) Jonathan Dasnières de Veigy	5	2
(Switzerland) George Bastl	7	6
(United Kingdom) Richard Bloomfield	6	6
(Italy) Massimo Dell'Acqua	3	4
(France) David Guez	5	7^{7}	6
7	(Colombia) Alejandro Falla	7	6^{5}	4

Second round
1	(Uzbekistan) Denis Istomin	3	7^{8}	5
(Switzerland) George Bastl	6	6^{6}	7
(United Kingdom) Richard Bloomfield	6	6
(France) David Guez	3	4

Qualifying competition
(Switzerland) George Bastl	3	4
(United Kingdom) Richard Bloomfield	6	6

==== Second qualifier ====
First round
2	(France) Adrian Mannarino	5	5
(Belgium) Dick Norman	7	7
Alt	(Spain) Andoni Vivanco-Guzmán	6	7^{7}
(Latvia) Kārlis Lejnieks	3	6^{4}
(France) Mathieu Rodrigues	4	1
(France) Pierre Metenier	6	6
(Netherlands) Michel Koning	6	2	3
6	(Andorra) Laurent Recouderc	3	6	6

Second round
(Belgium) Dick Norman	6	6
Alt	(Spain) Andoni Vivanco-Guzmán	2	4
(France) Pierre Metenier	1	6^{3}
6	(Andorra) Laurent Recouderc	6	7^{7}

Qualifying competition
(Belgium) Dick Norman	6^{5}	6	3
6	(Andorra) Laurent Recouderc	7^{7}	3	6

==== Third qualifier ====
First round
3	(Colombia) Santiago Giraldo	7	4	6^{4}
(France) Sébastien de Chaunac	5	6	7^{7}
(Netherlands) Matwé Middelkoop	7	6
WC	(France) Julien Jeanpierre	5	2
(Poland) Jerzy Janowicz	6	4	6
(France) Pierrick Ysern	4	6	3
WC	(France) Benoît Paire	4	6	4
5	(Netherlands) Jesse Huta Galung	6	4	6

Second round
(France) Sébastien de Chaunac	4	7^{8}	3
(Netherlands) Matwé Middelkoop	6	6^{6}	6
(Poland) Jerzy Janowicz	3	6	6
5	(Netherlands) Jesse Huta Galung	6	0	3

Qualifying competition
(Netherlands) Matwé Middelkoop	4	2
(Poland) Jerzy Janowicz	6	6

==== Fourth qualifier ====
First round
4	(South Africa) Rik de Voest	6	6
WC	(France) Romain Hardy	1	1
(France) Jérôme Haehnel	6	6
WC	(France) Ludovic Walter	1	4
(Spain) Ignacio Coll Riudavets	4	1
(Ukraine) Illya Marchenko	6	6
(France) Nicolas Renavand	1	6^{1}
8	(France) Thierry Ascione	6	7^{7}

Second round
4	(South Africa) Rik de Voest	6	6
(France) Jérôme Haehnel	2	3
(Ukraine) Illya Marchenko	6^{7}	6	6
8	(France) Thierry Ascione	7^{9}	4	4

Qualifying competition
4	(South Africa) Rik de Voest	2	5
(Ukraine) Illya Marchenko	6	7
