= 2012 Open 13 =

- Date: 20–26 February
- Edition: 20th
- Category: ATP World Tour 250
- Draw: 32S / 16D
- Prize money: €512,750
- Surface: Hard / indoor
- Location: Marseille, France

Champions

Singles
- (Argentina) Juan Martín del Potro

Doubles
- (France) Nicolas Mahut / (France) Édouard Roger-Vasselin
← 2011 ·	Open 13	· 2013 →

The 2012 Open 13 was a men's tennis tournament played on indoor hard courts. It was the 19th edition of the Open 13, and was part of the World Tour 250 tier of the 2012 ATP World Tour. It took place at the Palais des Sports in Marseille, France, from 20 February through 26 February 2010. Fourth-seeded Juan Martín del Potro won the singles title.

== Singles main draw entrants ==
=== Seeds ===
Country	Player	Ranking^{1}	Seeding
FRA	Jo-Wilfried Tsonga	6	1
USA	Mardy Fish	8	2
SRB	Janko Tipsarević	9	3
ARG	Juan Martín del Potro	10	4
FRA	Richard Gasquet	16	5
UKR	Alexandr Dolgopolov	19	6
CRO	Ivan Ljubičić	41	7
ITA	Andreas Seppi	45	8

- ^{1} Rankings as of February 13, 2012

=== Other entrants ===
The following players received wildcards into the main draw:

- (France) Arnaud Clément
- (France) Paul-Henri Mathieu
- (France) Florent Serra

The following players received entry from the qualifying draw:

- (Spain) Roberto Bautista-Agut
- (Switzerland) Marco Chiudinelli
- (Belgium) David Goffin
- (France) Albano Olivetti

=== Retirements ===
- (Russia) Nikolay Davydenko (right foot injury)
- (France) Adrian Mannarino (right wrist injury)

== Doubles main draw entrants ==
=== Seeds ===
Country	Player	Country	Player	Rank^{1}	Seed
IND	Mahesh Bhupathi	IND	Rohan Bopanna	26	1
AUS	Paul Hanley	GBR	Jamie Murray	86	2
NED	Jean-Julien Rojer	SVK	Igor Zelenay	128	3
AUT	Alexander Peya	CZE	Lukáš Rosol	130	4

- Rankings are as of February 13, 2012

=== Other entrants ===
The following pairs received wildcards into the doubles main draw:

- (France) David Guez / (France) Florent Serra
- (France) Pierre-Hugues Herbert / (France) Nicolas Renavand

== Finals ==
=== Singles ===
(Argentina) Juan Martín del Potro defeated (France) Michaël Llodra, 6–4, 6–4

- It was del Potro's 1st title of the year and 10th of his career.

=== Doubles ===
(France) Nicolas Mahut / (France) Édouard Roger-Vasselin defeated (Germany) Dustin Brown / (France) Jo-Wilfried Tsonga, 3–6, 6–4, [10–6]
