= 2011 Open 13 – Doubles =

Doubles
- 2011 Open 13

Final
- Champions: (Netherlands) Robin Haase (United Kingdom) Ken Skupski
- Runners-up: (France) Julien Benneteau (France) Jo-Wilfried Tsonga
- Score: 6–4, 6–7(4), [13-11]

Events
Singles	Doubles
← 2010 ·	Open 13	· 2012 →

Julien Benneteau and Michaël Llodra were the defending champions, but Llodra decided not to participate.
Benneteau played alongside Jo-Wilfried Tsonga. However, they lost to Robin Haase and Ken Skupski 4–6, 7–6(4), [11-13] in the final.

== Seeds ==
1. (Austria) Jürgen Melzer / (Germany) Philipp Petzschner (first round)
2. (Sweden) Simon Aspelin / (Austria) Julian Knowle (first round)
3. (Spain) Marc López / (Spain) Santiago Ventura (first round)
4. (Sweden) Johan Brunström / (Germany) Philipp Marx (first round)

== Draw ==
=== Key ===
- Q = Qualifier
- WC = Wild card
- LL = Lucky loser
- Alt = Alternate
- SE = Special exempt
- PR = Protected ranking
- ITF = ITF entry
- JE = Junior exempt
- w/o = Walkover
- r = Retired
- d = Defaulted
- SR = Special ranking

=== Draw ===
First round
1	(Austria) J Melzer (Germany) P Petzschner	7	4	[8]
(Poland) T Bednarek (Kazakhstan) A Golubev	5	6	[10]
(Germany) F Moser (Czech Republic) D Škoch	6	3	[5]
(Croatia) M Čilić (Croatia) L Zovko	3	6	[10]
3	(Spain) M López (Spain) S Ventura	4	2
(Italy) A Seppi (Slovakia) I Zelenay	6	6
(Netherlands) R Haase (United Kingdom) K Skupski	6	6
WC	(France) M Gicquel (France) D Guez	1	1
(United States) J Cerretani (Canada) A Shamasdin	6	3	[2]
(France) B Paire (France) É Roger-Vasselin	4	6	[10]
(France) A Clément (France) N Mahut	7	6
4	(Sweden) J Brunström (Germany) P Marx	6^{4}	1
(France) J Benneteau (France) J-W Tsonga	6	6
WC	(Bulgaria) G Dimitrov (Russia) D Tursunov	3	4
(United Kingdom) C Fleming (United Kingdom) R Hutchins	6	6
2	(Sweden) S Aspelin (Austria) J Knowle	1	4

Quarterfinals
(Poland) T Bednarek (Kazakhstan) A Golubev	0	2
(Croatia) M Čilić (Croatia) L Zovko	6	6
(Italy) A Seppi (Slovakia) I Zelenay	6^{3}	4
(Netherlands) R Haase (United Kingdom) K Skupski	7	6
(France) B Paire (France) É Roger-Vasselin	3	2
(France) A Clément (France) N Mahut	6	6
(France) J Benneteau (France) J-W Tsonga	4	6	[10]
(United Kingdom) C Fleming (United Kingdom) R Hutchins	6	3	[6]

Semifinals
(Croatia) M Čilić (Croatia) L Zovko	2	6^{7}
(Netherlands) R Haase (United Kingdom) K Skupski	6	7
(France) A Clément (France) N Mahut	3	4
(France) J Benneteau (France) J-W Tsonga	6	6

Final
(Netherlands) R Haase (United Kingdom) K Skupski	6	6^{4}	[13]
(France) J Benneteau (France) J-W Tsonga	3	7	[11]
