= 2011 Open 13 – Singles Qualifying =

This article displays the qualifying draw of the 2011 Open 13.

== Players ==
=== Seeds ===
1. (Kazakhstan) Mikhail Kukushkin (first round)
2. (Japan) Go Soeda (withdrew)
3. (France) Édouard Roger-Vasselin (qualified)
4. (Germany) Julian Reister (first round)
5. (Kazakhstan) Yuri Schukin (second round)
6. (Republic of Ireland) Conor Niland (first round)
7. (Switzerland) Stéphane Bohli (qualified)
8. (France) Vincent Millot (second round)

=== Qualifiers ===
1. (Netherlands) Thomas Schoorel
2. (Russia) Andrey Kumantsov
3. (France) Édouard Roger-Vasselin
4. (Switzerland) Stéphane Bohli

== Qualifying draw ==
=== First qualifier ===
First Round
1	(Kazakhstan) Mikhail Kukushkin	7	4	6^{4}
(France) Romain Jouan	5	6	7
(Germany) Jan-Lennard Struff	7	7
(France) Grégoire Burquier	6^{3}	6^{4}
(Netherlands) Thomas Schoorel	6	6
(Slovakia) Andrej Martin	4	4
(France) Florian Reynet	2	3
8	(France) Vincent Millot	6	6

Second Round
(France) Romain Jouan	6	6
(Germany) Jan-Lennard Struff	3	3
(Netherlands) Thomas Schoorel	6	6
8	(France) Vincent Millot	1	4

Qualifying Competition
(France) Romain Jouan	5	6^{1}
(Netherlands) Thomas Schoorel	7	7

=== Second qualifier ===
First Round
2	(Japan) Go Soeda	1	0^{r}
(Russia) Andrey Kumantsov	6	1
WC	(France) Mathias Bourgue	1	6^{2}
WC	(France) Jonathan Hilaire	6	7
(Belgium) Niels Desein	6	6^{8}	3
(Belgium) Ruben Bemelmans	3	7	6
(Kazakhstan) Evgeny Korolev	7	5	2
5	(Kazakhstan) Yuri Schukin	6^{2}	7	6

Second Round
(Russia) Andrey Kumantsov	6	6
WC	(France) Jonathan Hilaire	3	2
(Belgium) Ruben Bemelmans	7	6
5	(Kazakhstan) Yuri Schukin	5	4

Qualifying Competition
(Russia) Andrey Kumantsov	6	7
(Belgium) Ruben Bemelmans	4	6^{7}

=== Third qualifier ===
First Round
3	(France) Édouard Roger-Vasselin	6^{3}	6	6
(France) Marc Gicquel	7	1	0
(Belgium) Yannick Mertens	6	1	7
WC	(France) Pierre-Hugues Herbert	4	6	5
(Croatia) Nikola Mektić	6^{5}	3
(France) Alexandre Sidorenko	7	6
(Sweden) Michael Ryderstedt	6	6
6	(Republic of Ireland) Conor Niland	4	1

Second Round
3	(France) Édouard Roger-Vasselin	6	6
(Belgium) Yannick Mertens	3	1
(France) Alexandre Sidorenko	6	6^{8}	7
(Sweden) Michael Ryderstedt	4	7	6^{3}

Qualifying Competition
3	(France) Édouard Roger-Vasselin	6	6
(France) Alexandre Sidorenko	3	3

=== Fourth qualifier ===
First Round
4	(Germany) Julian Reister	2	5
(France) Maxime Teixeira	6	7
WC	(France) Antoine Escoffier	6	6^{3}	2
(France) Laurent Rochette	2	7	6
(Italy) Matteo Trevisan	0	2^{r}
(Portugal) João Sousa	6	3
(Czech Republic) Ivo Minář	1	6	2
7	(Switzerland) Stéphane Bohli	6	3	6

Second Round
(France) Maxime Teixeira	3	6	6
(France) Laurent Rochette	6	1	3
(Portugal) João Sousa	6^{5}	2
7	(Switzerland) Stéphane Bohli	7	6

Qualifying Competition
(France) Maxime Teixeira	6^{1}	1
7	(Switzerland) Stéphane Bohli	7	6
