= 2009 Open 13 – Doubles =

Doubles
- 2009 Open 13

Final
- Champions: (France) Arnaud Clément; (France) Michaël Llodra
- Runners-up: (Austria) Julian Knowle; (Israel) Andy Ram
- Score: 3–6, 6–3, [10–8]

Events
Singles	Doubles
← 2008 ·	Open 13	· 2010 →

Martin Damm and Pavel Vízner are the defending champions, but did not play together that year.
Martin Damm partnered with Robert Lindstedt, but lost in the first round to Arnaud Clément and Michaël Llodra.
Pavel Vízner partnered with Simon Aspelin, but lost in the first round to Julien Benneteau and Fabrice Santoro.

== Seeds ==
1. (Austria) Julian Knowle / (Israel) Andy Ram (final)
2. (Czech Republic) Martin Damm / (Sweden) Robert Lindstedt (first round)
3. (Sweden) Simon Aspelin / (Czech Republic) Pavel Vízner (first round)
4. (Australia) Stephen Huss / (United Kingdom) Ross Hutchins (semifinals)

== Draw ==
=== Key ===
- Q = Qualifier
- WC = Wild card
- LL = Lucky loser
- Alt = Alternate
- SE = Special exempt
- PR = Protected ranking
- ITF = ITF entry
- JE = Junior exempt
- w/o = Walkover
- r = Retired
- d = Defaulted
- SR = Special ranking

=== Draw ===
First round

Quarterfinals

Semifinals

Final

1
- (Austria) J Knowle
- (Israel) A Ram
7^{9}
7^{7}

- (South Africa) R de Voest
- (Netherlands) R Wassen
6^{7}
6^{2}

1
- (Austria) J Knowle
- (Israel) A Ram
6
6

- (France) M Gicquel
- (France) P-H Mathieu
4
2

- (Russia) M Youzhny
- (Germany) M Zverev
3
4

- (Russia) M Youzhny
- (Germany) M Zverev
6
6

1
- (Austria) J Knowle
- (Israel) A Ram
7^{7}
6

3
- (Sweden) S Aspelin
- (Czech Republic) P Vízner
4
5

- (Czech Republic) T Berdych
- (Czech Republic) J Hernych
6^{5}
2

WC
- (France) J Benneteau
- (France) F Santoro
6
7

WC
- (France) J Benneteau
- (France) F Santoro
3
3

- (Czech Republic) T Berdych
- (Czech Republic) J Hernych
6
7

- (Czech Republic) T Berdych
- (Czech Republic) J Hernych
6
6

WC
- (France) S de Chaunac
- (France) D Guez
2
5

1
- (Austria) J Knowle
- (Israel) A Ram
6
3
[8]

- (Germany) C Kas
- (Germany) R Schüttler
6^{4}
7^{7}
[12]

- (France) A Clément
- (France) M Llodra
3
6
[10]

- (France) N Mahut
- (France) G Simon
7^{7}
6^{5}
[10]

- (Germany) C Kas
- (Germany) R Schüttler
1
6^{3}

- (Italy) S Bolelli
- (Italy) A Seppi
3
4

4
- (Australia) S Huss
- (United Kingdom) R Hutchins
6
7^{7}

4
- (Australia) S Huss
- (United Kingdom) R Hutchins
6
6

4
- (Australia) S Huss
- (United Kingdom) R Hutchins
2
6^{2}

- (South Africa) W Moodie
- (Belgium) D Norman
7^{7}
6

- (France) A Clément
- (France) M Llodra
6
7^{7}

- (Sweden) J Brunström
- (Netherlands Antilles) J-J Rojer
6^{5}
2

- (South Africa) W Moodie
- (Belgium) D Norman
4
6^{1}

- (France) A Clément
- (France) M Llodra
7^{7}
6^{7}
[10]

- (France) A Clément
- (France) M Llodra
6
7^{7}

2
- (Czech Republic) M Damm
- (Sweden) R Lindstedt
6^{5}
7^{9}
[3]
