= 2010 Open 13 =

- Date: 15–21 February
- Edition: 18th
- Category: ATP World Tour 250
- Draw: 28S / 16D
- Prize money: €512,750
- Surface: Hard / indoor
- Location: Marseille, France

Champions

Singles
- (France) Michaël Llodra

Doubles
- (France) Julien Benneteau / (France) Michaël Llodra
- Open 13

The 2010 Open 13 is a men's tennis tournament played on indoor hard courts. It was the 17th edition of the Open 13, and is part of the International Series of the 2010 ATP World Tour. It took place at the Palais des Sports in Marseille, France, from February 15 through February 21, 2010.

It was also one of the few ATP tournaments to have been won only by European players, with France with 5 (Guy Forget, Fabrice Santoro, Arnaud Clément, Gilles Simon, and this year's defending champion Jo-Wilfried Tsonga), Sweden with 4 (Thomas Enqvist, Joachim Johansson), Switzerland with 4 (Marc Rosset, Roger Federer), Germany with 1 (Boris Becker), Russia with 1 (Yevgeny Kafelnikov), Slovakia with 1 (Dominik Hrbatý), and Great Britain with 1 (Andy Murray).

The singles draw feature ATP No. 8, 2009 French Open finalist Robin Söderling and defending champion Jo-Wilfried Tsonga. Other players include Gaël Monfils, Gilles Simon, Tommy Robredo, Mikhail Youzhny, Marcos Baghdatis and Julien Benneteau. The previous top two seeds here were Andy Murray and Juan Martín del Potro, but both had pulled out of the tournament earlier.

== ATP entrants ==
=== Seeds ===
Player	Nationality	Ranking*	Seeding
Robin Söderling	Sweden	8	1
Jo-Wilfried Tsonga	France	9	2
Gaël Monfils	France	13	3
Tommy Robredo	Spain	15	4
Gilles Simon	France	16	5
Mikhail Youzhny	Russia	20	6
Marcos Baghdatis	Cyprus	36	7
Julien Benneteau	France	38	8

- Rankings as of February 8, 2010.

=== Other entrants ===
The following players received wildcards into the main draw:

- (France) David Guez
- (France) Guillaume Rufin

The following players received entry from the qualifying draw:

- (Belgium) Ruben Bemelmans
- (Switzerland) Stéphane Bohli
- (Belgium) Yannick Mertens
- (France) Édouard Roger-Vasselin

The following players received entry as a lucky loser from the qualifying draw:

- (Ukraine) Illya Marchenko
- (France) Josselin Ouanna
- (France) Laurent Recouderc

== Finals ==
=== Singles ===
(France) Michaël Llodra defeated (France) Julien Benneteau, 6–3, 6–4

- It was Llodra's first title of the year, 4th title of his career, and his second consecutive final of the event.

=== Doubles ===
(France) Julien Benneteau / (France) Michaël Llodra defeated (Austria) Julian Knowle / (Sweden) Robert Lindstedt, 6–3, 6–4
