= 2009 Open 13 =

- Date: 16–22 February
- Edition: 17th
- Category: World Tour 250
- Draw: 32S / 16D
- Prize money: €512,750
- Surface: Hard / indoor
- Location: Marseille, France

Champions

Singles
- (France) Jo-Wilfried Tsonga

Doubles
- (France) Arnaud Clément / (France) Michaël Llodra
- Open 13

The 2009 Open 13 was a men's tennis tournament played on indoor hard courts. It was the 17th edition of the Open 13, and was part of the World Tour 250 tier of the 2009 ATP World Tour. It took place at the Palais des Sports in Marseille, France, from 16 February through 22 February 2009.

== Tournament ==
Before this year, the tournament was won by a home favorite on several occasions: Guy Forget in 1996, Fabrice Santoro in 1999, Arnaud Clément in 2006, and Gilles Simon in 2007. The record for most titles is three, won by the Swiss player Marc Rosset in its first two years in 1993 and 1994, as well as in 2000; the Swedish player Thomas Enqvist also won three, in 1997, 1998, and 2002. It is also one of the few ATP tournaments to have been won only by European players, with France with five (Forget, Santoro, Clément, Simon, and this year's winner Jo-Wilfried Tsonga), Sweden with 4 (Enqvist, Joachim Johansson), Switzerland with four (Rosset, Roger Federer), Germany with one (Boris Becker), Russia with one (Yevgeny Kafelnikov), Slovakia with one (Dominik Hrbatý), and Great Britain with one (Andy Murray).

== Entrants ==
=== Seeds ===
Richard Gasquet was the sixth seed, but had to withdraw.

Athlete	Nationality	Ranking*	Seeding
Novak Djokovic	Serbia	3	1
Gilles Simon	France	8	2
Gaël Monfils	France	11	3
Jo-Wilfried Tsonga	France	12	4
Tomáš Berdych	Czech Republic	24	5
Richard Gasquet	France	27	6
Marat Safin	Russia	26	7
Feliciano López	Spain	28	8

- Rankings as of February 16, 2009.

=== Other entrants ===
The following players received wildcards into the main draw:

- (Russia) Marat Safin
- (Bulgaria) Grigor Dimitrov

The following players received entry from the qualifying draw:

- (Ukraine) Illya Marchenko
- (United Kingdom) Richard Bloomfield
- (Poland) Jerzy Janowicz
- (South Africa) Rik de Voest (as a lucky loser)
- (Switzerland) George Bastl (as a lucky loser)
- (France) Laurent Recouderc

== Finals ==
=== Singles ===
Previous winners in the field included Gilles Simon, Arnaud Clément, and Fabrice Santoro, with Simon being the only one to advance past the second round. Seeded players suffered mixed fortunes with Marat Safin, Tomáš Berdych and Gaël Monfils all losing in the first round. Richard Gasquet was also forced to pull out though injury.

In the quarterfinals, top seed Novak Djokovic advanced past Jan Hernych and second seed Simon advanced past compatriot Julien Benneteau. The other two matches were harder victories for Michaël Llodra over Mikhail Youzhny and fourth seed Jo-Wilfried Tsonga over eighth seed Feliciano López. In the semifinals, unseeded Michaël Llodra defeated Simon 7–6 6–2, while Tsonga defeated Djokovic for the fourth time in a row 6–4, 7–6. This set up an all-French battle between Tsonga and Llodra, which saw Tsonga come out in top in a close-fought match 7–5, 7–6.

Result of the final: (France) Jo-Wilfried Tsonga defeated (France) Michaël Llodra, 7–5, 7–6^{(7–3)}

- It was Tsonga's 2nd title of the year and 4th of his career.

=== Doubles ===
Previous winners in the field included Arnaud Clément & Michaël Llodra, Pavel Vízner, Martin Damm, Fabrice Santoro, and Simon Aspelin (the last four all had different partners previously). The semifinals consisted of top duo Julian Knowle & Andy Ram, the Czech pairing of Tomáš Berdych & Jan Hernych, Stephen Huss & Ross Hutchins, and the home favorites Clément & Llodra. Clément & Llodra defeated Huss & Hutchins 6–2 7–6, while Knowle & Ram advanced into their expected final with a 7–6 6–2 victory over the Czechs.

Result of the final: (France) Arnaud Clément / (France) Michaël Llodra defeated (Austria) Julian Knowle / (Israel) Andy Ram, 3–6, 6–3, [10–8]
