= 2010 Open 13 – Doubles =

Doubles
- 2010 Open 13

Final
- Champions: (France) Julien Benneteau (France) Michaël Llodra
- Runners-up: (Austria) Julian Knowle (Sweden) Robert Lindstedt
- Score: 6–4, 6–3

Events
| Singles | Doubles |
| ← 2009 · | Open 13 | · 2011 → |

Arnaud Clément and Michaël Llodra were the defending champions but chose not compete together.
Clément partnered with Nicolas Mahut and Llodra partnered with Julien Benneteau. They met in the semifinals and Benneteau & Llodra won this match 7–6(0), 6–4. One day later they defeated 6–4, 6–3 Julian Knowle and Robert Lindstedt in the final.

== Seeds ==
1. (Austria) Julian Knowle / (Sweden) Robert Lindstedt (final)
2. (France) Julien Benneteau / (France) Michaël Llodra (champions)
3. (Spain) Marc López / (Spain) Tommy Robredo (quarterfinals)
4. (United Kingdom) Colin Fleming / (United Kingdom) Ken Skupski (first round)

== Draw ==
=== Key ===
- Q = Qualifier
- WC = Wild card
- LL = Lucky loser
- Alt = Alternate
- SE = Special exempt
- PR = Protected ranking
- ITF = ITF entry
- JE = Junior exempt
- w/o = Walkover
- r = Retired
- d = Defaulted
- SR = Special ranking

=== Draws ===
First round
1 | (Austria) J Knowle (Sweden) R Lindstedt | 6 | 7^{7}
(France) T Ascione (Cyprus) M Baghdatis | 4 | 6^{3}
(Thailand) Sa Ratiwatana (Thailand) So Ratiwatana | 4 | 6 | [10]
(France) D Guez (France) F Serra | 6 | 2 | [8]
3 | (Spain) M López (Spain) T Robredo | 3 | 6 | [10]
(Italy) S Bolelli (Italy) A Seppi | 6 | 3 | [7]
(India) R Bopanna (South Africa) J Coetzee | 6 | 6
(Belgium) C Rochus (Belgium) O Rochus | 2 | 1
WC | (France) P Mamata (France) G Monfils | 1 | 4
(South Africa) R de Voest (Pakistan) A-u-H Qureshi | 6 | 6
(France) A Clément (France) N Mahut | 7^{7} | 6
4 | (United Kingdom) C Fleming (United Kingdom) K Skupski | 6^{4} | 3
WC | (France) J Ouanna (France) É Roger-Vasselin | 3 | 4
(Ukraine) S Stakhovsky (Netherlands) R Wassen | 6 | 6
(Germany) P Marx (Slovakia) I Zelenay | 1 | 6^{2}
2 | (France) J Benneteau (France) M Llodra | 6 | 7^{7}

Quarterfinals
1 | (Austria) J Knowle (Sweden) R Lindstedt | 6 | 7^{11}
(Thailand) Sa Ratiwatana (Thailand) So Ratiwatana | 4 | 6^{9}
3 | (Spain) M López (Spain) T Robredo | 6 | 1 | [19]
(India) R Bopanna (South Africa) J Coetzee | 4 | 6 | [21]
(South Africa) R de Voest (Pakistan) A-u-H Qureshi | 3 | 5
(France) A Clément (France) N Mahut | 6 | 7
(Ukraine) S Stakhovsky (Netherlands) R Wassen | 2 | 2
2 | (France) J Benneteau (France) M Llodra | 6 | 6

Semifinals
1 | (Austria) J Knowle (Sweden) R Lindstedt | 6 | 0 | [10]
(India) R Bopanna (South Africa) J Coetzee | 4 | 6 | [6]
(France) A Clément (France) N Mahut | 6^{0} | 4
2 | (France) J Benneteau (France) M Llodra | 7^{7} | 6

Finals
1 | (Austria) J Knowle (Sweden) R Lindstedt | 4 | 3
2 | (France) J Benneteau (France) M Llodra | 6 | 6
