= 2011 Open 13 =

- Date: 14–20 February
- Edition: 19th
- Category: ATP World Tour 250
- Draw: 32S / 16D
- Prize money: €512,750
- Location: Marseille, France
- Venue: Palais des Sports

Champions

Singles
- (Sweden) Robin Söderling

Doubles
- (Netherlands) Robin Haase / (United Kingdom) Ken Skupski
- Open 13

The 2011 Open 13 was a men's tennis tournament played on indoor hard courts. It was the 18th edition of the Open 13, and was part of the ATP World Tour 250 tier of the 2011 ATP World Tour. It took place at the Palais des Sports in Marseille, France, from 14 February through 20 February 2010. First-seeded Robin Söderling won the singles title.

== Entrants ==
=== Seeds ===
| Country | Player | Ranking^{1} | Seeding |
|---|---|---|---|
| SWE | Robin Söderling | 4 | 1 |
| CZE | Tomáš Berdych | 7 | 2 |
| RUS | Mikhail Youzhny | 10 | 3 |
| AUT | Jürgen Melzer | 11 | 4 |
| CRO | Ivan Ljubičić | 15 | 5 |
| FRA | Jo-Wilfried Tsonga | 18 | 6 |
| LAT | Ernests Gulbis | 21 | 7 |
| FRA | Michaël Llodra | 22 | 8 |

- ^{1} Rankings are as of February 7, 2011.

=== Other entrants ===
The following players received wildcards into the main draw:

- (Bulgaria) Grigor Dimitrov
- (France) Nicolas Mahut
- (France) Benoît Paire

The following players received entry from the qualifying draw:

- (Switzerland) Stéphane Bohli
- (Russia) Andrey Kumantsov
- (France) Édouard Roger-Vasselin
- (Netherlands) Thomas Schoorel

== Finals ==
=== Singles ===
(Sweden) Robin Söderling defeated (Croatia) Marin Čilić, 6–7^{(8–10)}, 6–3, 6–3

- It was Soderling's 3rd title of the year and 9th of his career.

=== Doubles ===
(Netherlands) Robin Haase / (United Kingdom) Ken Skupski defeated (France) Julien Benneteau / (France) Jo-Wilfried Tsonga, 6–4, 6–7(4), [13-11]
