= 2012 Open 13 – Doubles =

Doubles
- 2012 Open 13

Final
- Champions: (France) Nicolas Mahut (France) Édouard Roger-Vasselin
- Runners-up: (Germany) Dustin Brown (France) Jo-Wilfried Tsonga
- Score: 3–6, 6–3, [10–6]

Events
Singles	Doubles
← 2011 ·	Open 13	· 2013 →

Robin Haase and Ken Skupski were the defending champions, but Haase decided not to participate.
Skupski played alongside Jamie Delgado but were eliminated in the semifinals.
Nicolas Mahut and Édouard Roger-Vasselin defeated Dustin Brown and Jo-Wilfried Tsonga 3–6, 6–3, [10–6] in the final to win the title.

== Seeds ==
1. (India) Mahesh Bhupathi / (India) Rohan Bopanna (semifinals)
2. (Australia) Paul Hanley / (United Kingdom) Jamie Murray (first round)
3. (Netherlands) Jean-Julien Rojer / (Slovakia) Igor Zelenay (quarterfinals)
4. (Austria) Alexander Peya / (Czech Republic) Lukáš Rosol (first round)

== Draw ==
=== Key ===
- Q = Qualifier
- WC = Wild card
- LL = Lucky loser
- Alt = Alternate
- SE = Special exempt
- PR = Protected ranking
- ITF = ITF entry
- JE = Junior exempt
- w/o = Walkover
- r = Retired
- d = Defaulted
- SR = Special ranking

=== Draw ===
First round
1	(India) M Bhupathi (India) R Bopanna	6	5	[10]
(United States) J Cerretani (Canada) A Shamasdin	3	7	[3]
(Germany) M Emmrich (Sweden) A Siljeström	4	6	[7]
(France) A Clément (Czech Republic) L Dlouhý	6	4	[10]
3	(Netherlands) J-J Rojer (Slovakia) I Zelenay	6	6
(Italy) F Cipolla (Italy) A Seppi	3	2
(Germany) P Marx (Germany) F Moser	6^{4}	6	[6]
(Germany) D Brown (France) J-W Tsonga	7^{7}	4	[10]
(Austria) J Knowle (Germany) M Kohlmann	2	4
(Sweden) J Brunström (Belgium) D Norman	6	6
(France) N Mahut (France) É Roger-Vasselin	5	6	[10]
4	(Austria) A Peya (Czech Republic) L Rosol	7	4	[6]
WC	(France) P-H Herbert (France) N Renavand	4	6	[7]
(United Kingdom) J Delgado (United Kingdom) K Skupski	6	3	[10]
WC	(France) D Guez (France) F Serra	3	7^{7}	[10]
2	(Australia) P Hanley (United Kingdom) J Murray	6	6^{1}	[8]

Quarterfinals
1	(India) M Bhupathi (India) R Bopanna	6	6
(France) A Clément (Czech Republic) L Dlouhý	3	4
3	(Netherlands) J-J Rojer (Slovakia) I Zelenay	1	6^{4}
(Germany) D Brown (France) J-W Tsonga	6	7^{7}
(Sweden) J Brunström (Belgium) D Norman	2	6	[5]
(France) N Mahut (France) É Roger-Vasselin	6	3	[10]
(United Kingdom) J Delgado (United Kingdom) K Skupski	6	6
WC	(France) D Guez (France) F Serra	3	3

Semifinals
1	(India) M Bhupathi (India) R Bopanna	7^{7}	5	[6]
(Germany) D Brown (France) J-W Tsonga	6^{3}	7	[10]
(France) N Mahut (France) É Roger-Vasselin	6	6
(United Kingdom) J Delgado (United Kingdom) K Skupski	2	3

Final
(Germany) D Brown (France) J-W Tsonga	6	3	[6]
(France) N Mahut (France) É Roger-Vasselin	3	6	[10]
