= 2012 Open 13 – Singles =

Singles
- 2012 Open 13

Final
- Champion: (Argentina) Juan Martín del Potro
- Runner-up: (France) Michaël Llodra
- Score: 6–4, 6–4

Details
- Draw: 28 (4 Q / 3 WC )
- Seeds: 8

Events
Singles	Doubles
- Open 13

Robin Söderling was the defending champion but could not participate.
Juan Martín del Potro won the title by defeating Michaël Llodra 6–4, 6–4 in the final.

== Seeds ==
1. (France) Jo-Wilfried Tsonga (semifinals)
2. (United States) Mardy Fish (second round)
3. (Serbia) Janko Tipsarević (semifinals)
4. (Argentina) Juan Martín del Potro (champion)
5. (France) Richard Gasquet (quarterfinals)
6. (Ukraine) Alexandr Dolgopolov (second round)
7. (Croatia) Ivan Ljubičić (quarterfinals)
8. (Italy) Andreas Seppi (first round)

== Draw ==
Key

- Q = Qualifier
- WC = Wild card
- LL = Lucky loser
- Alt = Alternate
- ITF = ITF entry
- PR = Protected ranking
- SR = Special ranking
- SE = Special exempt
- JE = Junior exempt
- JR = Junior Accelerator Programme entrant
- CO = College Accelerator Programme entrant
- NG = Next Gen Accelerator Program entrant
- w/o = Walkover
- r = Retired
- d = Defaulted

=== Finals ===
Semifinals
1	(France) Jo-Wilfried Tsonga	4	7^{11}	3
4	(Argentina) Juan Martín del Potro	6	6^{9}	6
3	(Serbia) Janko Tipsarević	4	6^{10}
(France) Michaël Llodra	6	7^{12}

Final
4	(Argentina) Juan Martín del Potro	6	6
(France) Michaël Llodra	4	4

=== Top half ===
First round
(France) N Mahut	6	6
WC	(France) A Clément	3	4
(Finland) J Nieminen	2	6^{4}
(France) É Roger-Vasselin	6	7^{7}
(Italy) F Cipolla	6	7^{7}
8	(Italy) A Seppi	4	6^{4}
(Russia) N Davydenko	6	7
(Germany) A Beck	1	5
(Russia) I Kunitsyn	6	6
Q	(Spain) R Bautista-Agut	4	4
(Japan) G Soeda	0	2
5	(France) R Gasquet	6	6

Second round
1	(France) J-W Tsonga	6	6
(France) N Mahut	3	2
(France) É Roger-Vasselin	6	6
(Italy) F Cipolla	3	0
4	(Argentina) JM del Potro	6^{6}	6
(Russia) N Davydenko	7^{8}	4	r
(Russia) I Kunitsyn	3	2
5	(France) R Gasquet	6	6

Quarterfinals
1	(France) J-W Tsonga	6	7
(France) É Roger-Vasselin	4	5
4	(Argentina) JM del Potro	7	7^{7}
5	(France) R Gasquet	5	6^{5}

Semifinals
1	(France) J-W Tsonga	4	7^{11}	3
4	(Argentina) JM del Potro	6	6^{9}	6

=== Bottom half ===
First round
7	(Croatia) I Ljubičić	6	6^{3}	6
WC	(France) F Serra	4	7^{7}	3
WC	(France) P-H Mathieu	6^{2}	6	3
(Slovakia) K Beck	7^{7}	2	6
(France) A Mannarino	2	0^{r}
Q	(Belgium) D Goffin	6	1
6	(Ukraine) A Dolgopolov	2	7^{7}	6
(Czech Republic) L Rosol	6	6^{1}	3
Q	(Switzerland) M Chiudinelli	6^{2}	6^{3}
(France) M Llodra	7^{7}	7^{7}
(Germany) M Bachinger	4	3
Q	(France) A Olivetti	6	6

Second round
7	(Croatia) I Ljubičić	6	7^{7}
(Slovakia) K Beck	4	6^{1}
Q	(Belgium) D Goffin	4	2
3	(Serbia) J Tipsarević	6	6
6	(Ukraine) A Dolgopolov	4	7	6^{5}
(France) M Llodra	6	5	7^{7}
Q	(France) A Olivetti	6	3	6
2	(United States) M Fish	3	6	3

Quarterfinals
7	(Croatia) I Ljubičić	4	4
3	(Serbia) J Tipsarević	6	6
(France) M Llodra	7^{7}	7
Q	(France) A Olivetti	6^{5}	5

Semifinals
3	(Serbia) J Tipsarević	4	6^{10}
(France) M Llodra	6	7^{12}

== Qualifying ==
=== Seeds ===
1. (Japan) Tatsuma Ito (qualifying competition)
2. (South Africa) Rik de Voest (qualifying competition)
3. (Belgium) Ruben Bemelmans (first round)
4. (France) Marc Gicquel (first round)
5. (France) Augustin Gensse (first round)
6. (Spain) Roberto Bautista-Agut (qualified)
7. (Belgium) David Goffin (qualified)
8. (France) Kenny de Schepper (first round)

=== Qualifiers ===
1. (Switzerland) Marco Chiudinelli
2. (Spain) Roberto Bautista-Agut
3. (France) Albano Olivetti
4. (Belgium) David Goffin

=== Draw ===
==== First qualifier ====
First round
1	(Japan) Tatsuma Ito	6	6
(France) Maxime Teixeira	2	4
(France) Maxime Tchoutakian	1	4
(France) David Guez	6	6
(India) Rohan Bopanna	3	6	6^{5}
(France) Laurent Rochette	6	3	7^{7}
(Switzerland) Marco Chiudinelli	6	6
8	(France) Kenny de Schepper	4	2

Second round
1	(Japan) Tatsuma Ito	6	3	6
(France) David Guez	2	6	4
(France) Laurent Rochette	4	2
(Switzerland) Marco Chiudinelli	6	6

Qualifying competition
1	(Japan) Tatsuma Ito	2	6^{5}
(Switzerland) Marco Chiudinelli	6	7^{7}

==== Second qualifier ====
First round
2	(South Africa) Rik de Voest	6	7^{7}
(France) Fabrice Martin	4	6^{5}
WC	(France) Florent Scaccianoce	6^{9}	3
(Monaco) Benjamin Balleret	7^{11}	6
(France) Nicolas Renavand	6	6
(France) Clément Reix	2	2
(France) Pierre-Hugues Herbert	4	6	3
6	(Spain) Roberto Bautista-Agut	6	3	6

Second round
2	(South Africa) Rik de Voest	6^{3}	6	7^{7}
(Monaco) Benjamin Balleret	7^{7}	2	6^{5}
(France) Nicolas Renavand	4	7^{8}	3
6	(Spain) Roberto Bautista-Agut	6	6^{6}	6

Qualifying competition
2	(South Africa) Rik de Voest	4	4
6	(Spain) Roberto Bautista-Agut	6	6

==== Third qualifier ====
First round
3	(Belgium) Ruben Bemelmans	6^{2}	5
(France) Josselin Ouanna	7^{7}	7
(France) Martin Vaïsse	1	4
(France) Albano Olivetti	6	6
(France) Romain Jouan	6	6
(France) Mathias Bourgue	3	2
(France) Alexandre Sidorenko	6	6
5	(France) Augustin Gensse	2	3

Second round
(France) Josselin Ouanna	3	6^{7}
(France) Albano Olivetti	6	7^{9}
(France) Romain Jouan	7^{7}	6
(France) Alexandre Sidorenko	6^{3}	3

Qualifying competition
(France) Albano Olivetti	6	3	7^{10}
(France) Romain Jouan	4	6	6^{8}

==== Fourth qualifier ====
First round
4	(France) Marc Gicquel	2	2
(Czech Republic) Jan Hernych	6	6
(France) Jonathan Dasnières de Veigy	6	5	6^{4}
(France) Grégoire Burquier	4	7	7^{7}
(Belgium) Yannick Mertens	6	7^{7}
(France) Nicolas Devilder	3	6^{2}
(Switzerland) Stéphane Bohli	6^{3}	2
7	(Belgium) David Goffin	7^{7}	6

Second round
(Czech Republic) Jan Hernych	6^{5}	7^{7}	7
(France) Grégoire Burquier	7^{7}	6^{5}	5
(Belgium) Yannick Mertens	3	3
7	(Belgium) David Goffin	6	6

Qualifying competition
(Czech Republic) Jan Hernych	6^{5}	3
7	(Belgium) David Goffin	7^{7}	6
