= 2010 Open 13 – Singles =

Singles
- 2010 Open 13

Final
- Champion: (France) Michaël Llodra
- Runner-up: (France) Julien Benneteau
- Score: 6–3, 6–4

Details
- Draw: 28 (4 Q / 2 WC )
- Seeds: 8

Events
Singles	Doubles
- Open 13

Jo-Wilfried Tsonga was the defending champion, but he was defeated in the semifinals by countryman Julien Benneteau 7–6^{(13–11)}, 5–7, 7–6^{(7–3)}.

Michaël Llodra won in the final 6–3, 6–4, against Julien Benneteau.

== Seeds ==
The top four seeds receive a bye into the second round.

1. (Sweden) Robin Söderling (quarterfinals)
2. (France) Jo-Wilfried Tsonga (semifinals)
3. (France) Gaël Monfils (quarterfinals)
4. (Spain) Tommy Robredo (second round)
5. (France) Gilles Simon (first round)
6. (Russia) Mikhail Youzhny (withdrew because of a right hamstring injury)
7. (Cyprus) Marcos Baghdatis (second round)
8. (France) Julien Benneteau (final)

== Draw ==
Key

- Q = Qualifier
- WC = Wild card
- LL = Lucky loser
- Alt = Alternate
- ITF = ITF entry
- PR = Protected ranking
- SR = Special ranking
- SE = Special exempt
- JE = Junior exempt
- JR = Junior Accelerator Programme entrant
- CO = College Accelerator Programme entrant
- NG = Next Gen Accelerator Program entrant
- w/o = Walkover
- r = Retired
- d = Defaulted

=== Finals ===
Semifinals
(France) Michaël Llodra	6	7^{7}
(Germany) Mischa Zverev	1	6^{3}
8	(France) Julien Benneteau	7^{13}	5	7^{7}
2	(France) Jo-Wilfried Tsonga	6^{11}	7	6^{3}

Final
(France) Michaël Llodra	6	6
8	(France) Julien Benneteau	3	4

=== Top half ===
First round
(Ukraine) S Stakhovsky	6	3	6
(Italy) S Bolelli	3	6	4
Q	(France) É Roger-Vasselin	7^{7}	3	4
(France) M Llodra	6^{5}	6	6
(Germany) D Brands	3	2
7	(Cyprus) M Baghdatis	6	6
(Germany) M Zverev	7^{7}	6
WC	(France) D Guez	6^{3}	4
(Czech Republic) J Hájek	6^{8}	1
Q	(Belgium) Y Mertens	7^{10}	6
WC	(France) G Rufin	7	4	7^{7}
LL	(France) L Recouderc	5	6	6^{2}

Second round
1	(Sweden) R Söderling	6^{5}	6	6
(Ukraine) S Stakhovsky	7^{7}	3	4
(France) M Llodra	7^{8}	6
7	(Cyprus) M Baghdatis	6^{6}	4
4	(Spain) T Robredo	2	6	1
(Germany) M Zverev	6	3	6
Q	(Belgium) Y Mertens	3	6	2
WC	(France) G Rufin	6	2	6

Quarterfinals
1	(Sweden) R Söderling	6^{2}	4
(France) M Llodra	7^{7}	6
(Germany) M Zverev	7	6^{4}	6
WC	(France) G Rufin	5	7^{7}	3

Semifinals
(France) M Llodra	6	7^{7}
(Germany) M Zverev	1	6^{3}

=== Bottom half ===
First round
8	(France) J Benneteau	7^{7}	7^{7}
Q	(Switzerland) S Bohli	6^{5}	6^{3}
(Russia) I Kunitsyn	3	3
(France) F Serra	6	6
(France) A Clément	6^{2}	5
(Italy) A Seppi	7^{7}	7
5	(France) G Simon	5	2
(Belgium) O Rochus	7	6
LL	(Ukraine) I Marchenko	4	6	6
Q	(Belgium) R Bemelmans	6	3	2
LL	(France) J Ouanna	6	1	6
(Uzbekistan) D Istomin	4	6	3

Second round
8	(France) J Benneteau	6	6
(France) F Serra	4	4
(Italy) A Seppi	6^{4}	6	6^{3}
3	(France) G Monfils	7^{7}	3	7^{7}
(Belgium) O Rochus	1	6	2
LL	(Ukraine) I Marchenko	6	3	6
LL	(France) J Ouanna	6^{9}	4
2	(France) J-W Tsonga	7^{11}	6

Quarterfinals
8	(France) J Benneteau	6	7
3	(France) G Monfils	3	5
LL	(Ukraine) I Marchenko	3	4
2	(France) J-W Tsonga	6	6

Semifinals
8	(France) J Benneteau	7^{13}	5	7^{7}
2	(France) J-W Tsonga	6^{11}	7	6^{3}

== Qualifying ==
=== Seeds ===
1. (Ukraine) Illya Marchenko (qualifying competition, lucky loser)
2. (Russia) ~~Igor Kunitsyn~~ (withdrew)
3. (France) Josselin Ouanna (qualifying competition, lucky loser)
4. (Andorra) Laurent Recouderc (qualifying competition, lucky loser)
5. (Switzerland) Stéphane Bohli (qualified)
6. (France) Thierry Ascione (second round)
7. (France) Édouard Roger-Vasselin (qualified)
8. (Ukraine) Ivan Sergeyev (second round)

=== Qualifiers ===
1. (France) Édouard Roger-Vasselin
2. (Belgium) Yannick Mertens
3. (Switzerland) Stéphane Bohli
4. (Belgium) Ruben Bemelmans

=== Lucky loser ===
1. (Ukraine) Illya Marchenko
2. (France) Josselin Ouanna
3. (Andorra) Laurent Recouderc

=== Draw ===
==== First qualifier ====
First round
1	(Ukraine) Illya Marchenko	4	6	6
(South Africa) Rik de Voest	6	3	2
(Netherlands) Igor Sijsling	4	6^{3}
(France) Nicolas Mahut	6	7^{7}
WC	(France) Jonathan Hilaire	3	4
(Republic of Ireland) Conor Niland	6	6
WC	(France) Thibault Venturino	3	2
7	(France) Édouard Roger-Vasselin	6	6

Second round
1	(Ukraine) Illya Marchenko	7^{7}	6
(France) Nicolas Mahut	6^{2}	4
(Republic of Ireland) Conor Niland	5	3
7	(France) Édouard Roger-Vasselin	7	6

Qualifying competition
1	(Ukraine) Illya Marchenko	3	6	3
7	(France) Édouard Roger-Vasselin	6	1	6

==== Second qualifier ====
First round
Alt	(Belgium) Yannick Mertens	6	4
(Monaco) Benjamin Balleret	3	1^{r}
(Japan) Takao Suzuki	3	3
(Sweden) Andreas Vinciguerra	6	6
(Ukraine) Sergei Bubka	6	6
(Russia) Evgeny Kirillov	2	4
(Italy) Marco Crugnola	1	3
8	(Ukraine) Ivan Sergeyev	6	6

Second round
Alt	(Belgium) Yannick Mertens	7^{7}	6
(Sweden) Andreas Vinciguerra	6^{1}	2
(Ukraine) Sergei Bubka	7^{7}	6
8	(Ukraine) Ivan Sergeyev	6^{5}	3

Qualifying competition
Alt	(Belgium) Yannick Mertens	4	6	7^{7}
(Ukraine) Sergei Bubka	6	4	6^{5}

==== Third qualifier ====
First round
3	(France) Josselin Ouanna	7	6
(Japan) Go Soeda	5	4
(United Kingdom) James Ward	6	5	3
(Kazakhstan) Yuri Schukin	3	7	6
(Spain) Roberto Bautista Agut	3	6	6
WC	(France) Jérôme Inzerillo	6	2	1
(United Kingdom) Dan Evans	2	5
5	(Switzerland) Stéphane Bohli	6	7

Second round
3	(France) Josselin Ouanna	6	6
(Kazakhstan) Yuri Schukin	3	4
(Spain) Roberto Bautista Agut	2	1
5	(Switzerland) Stéphane Bohli	6	6

Qualifying competition
3	(France) Josselin Ouanna	3	2
5	(Switzerland) Stéphane Bohli	6	6

==== Fourth qualifier ====
First round
4	(Andorra) Laurent Recouderc	7	6
(Netherlands) Jesse Huta Galung	5	3
(Italy) Stefano Galvani	6^{6}	6	6
(Spain) Adrián Menéndez Maceiras	7^{8}	2	4
(Belgium) Niels Desein	6^{7}	3
(Belgium) Ruben Bemelmans	7^{9}	6
WC	(France) Romain Hardy	1	4
6	(France) Thierry Ascione	6	6

Second round
4	(Andorra) Laurent Recouderc	7^{7}	1	7^{7}
(Italy) Stefano Galvani	6^{3}	6	6^{5}
(Belgium) Ruben Bemelmans	3	6	7^{7}
6	(France) Thierry Ascione	6	3	6^{3}

Qualifying competition
4	(Andorra) Laurent Recouderc	6^{5}	4
(Belgium) Ruben Bemelmans	7^{7}	6
