= Michaël Llodra =

French tennis player

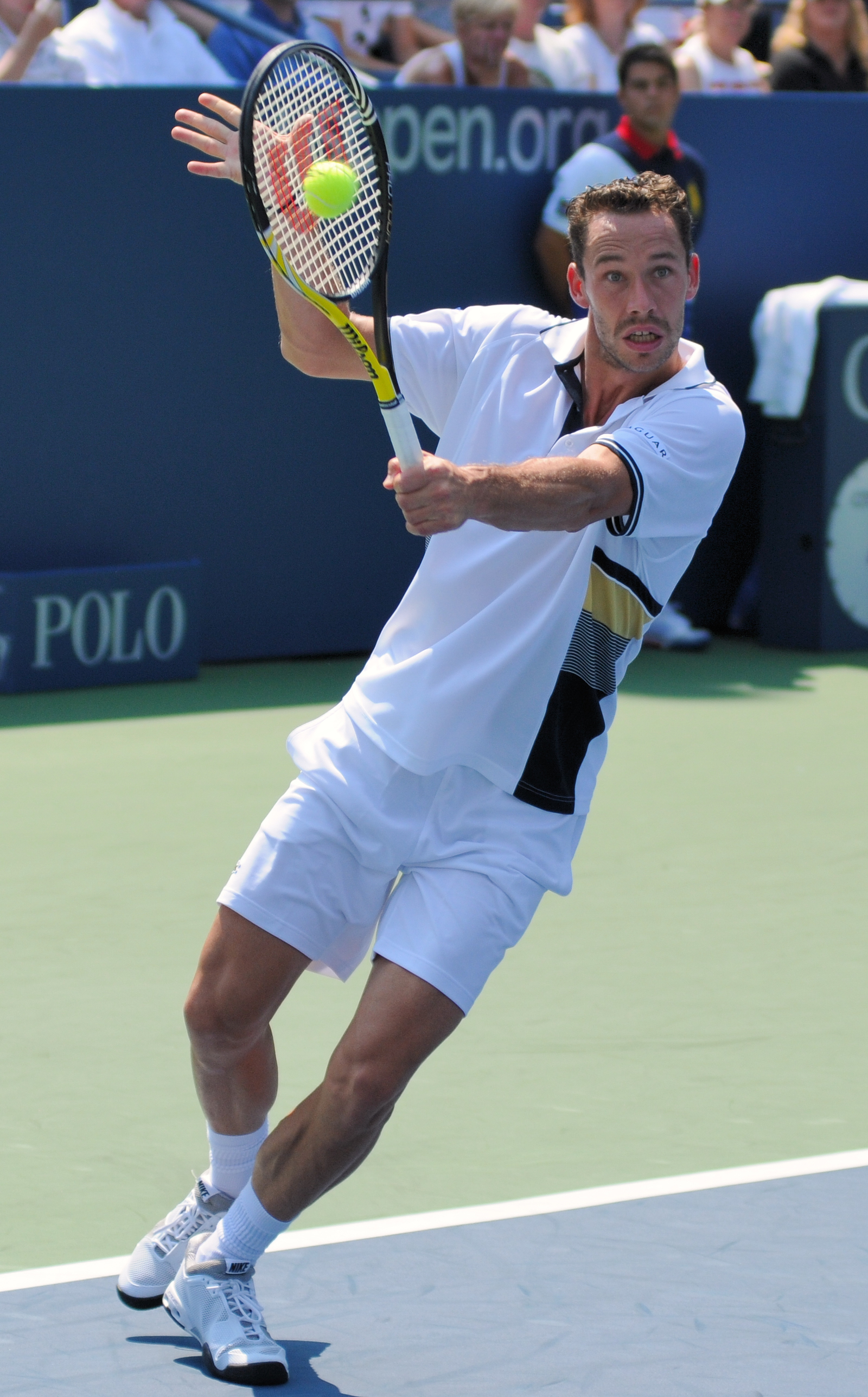
- Country (sports): France
- Residence: Rueil-Malmaison, France
- Born: 18 May 1980 (age 46) Paris, France
- Height: 1.91 m (6 ft 3 in)
- Turned pro: 1999
- Retired: 2014
- Plays: Left-handed (one-handed backhand)
- Prize money: $8,533,350

Singles
- Career record: 187–221
- Career titles: 5
- Highest ranking: No. 21 (9 May 2011)

Grand Slam singles results
- Australian Open: 3R (2012)
- French Open: 4R (2004, 2008)
- Wimbledon: 4R (2011)
- US Open: 4R (2004)

Other tournaments
- Olympic Games: 2R (2008)

Doubles
- Career record: 387–224
- Career titles: 26
- Highest ranking: No. 3 (14 November 2011)

Grand Slam doubles results
- Australian Open: W (2003, 2004)
- French Open: F (2004, 2013)
- Wimbledon: W (2007)
- US Open: SF (2003)

Other doubles tournaments
- Tour Finals: W (2005)
Medal record
Olympic Games – Tennis
Silver medal – second place	2012 London	Doubles

Michaël Llodra (French pronunciation: [mikaɛl jɔdʁa]; born 18 May 1980) is a French former professional tennis player. He was ranked as the world No. 3 in men's doubles by the Association of Tennis Professionals (ATP), winning 26 career doubles titles, including three majors and an Olympic silver medal. Llodra also had success in singles, winning five career titles and with victories over Novak Djokovic, Juan Martín del Potro, Tomáš Berdych, Robin Söderling, Jo-Wilfried Tsonga, Nikolay Davydenko, Janko Tipsarević and John Isner. Llodra has been called "the best volleyer on tour."

== Life and career ==
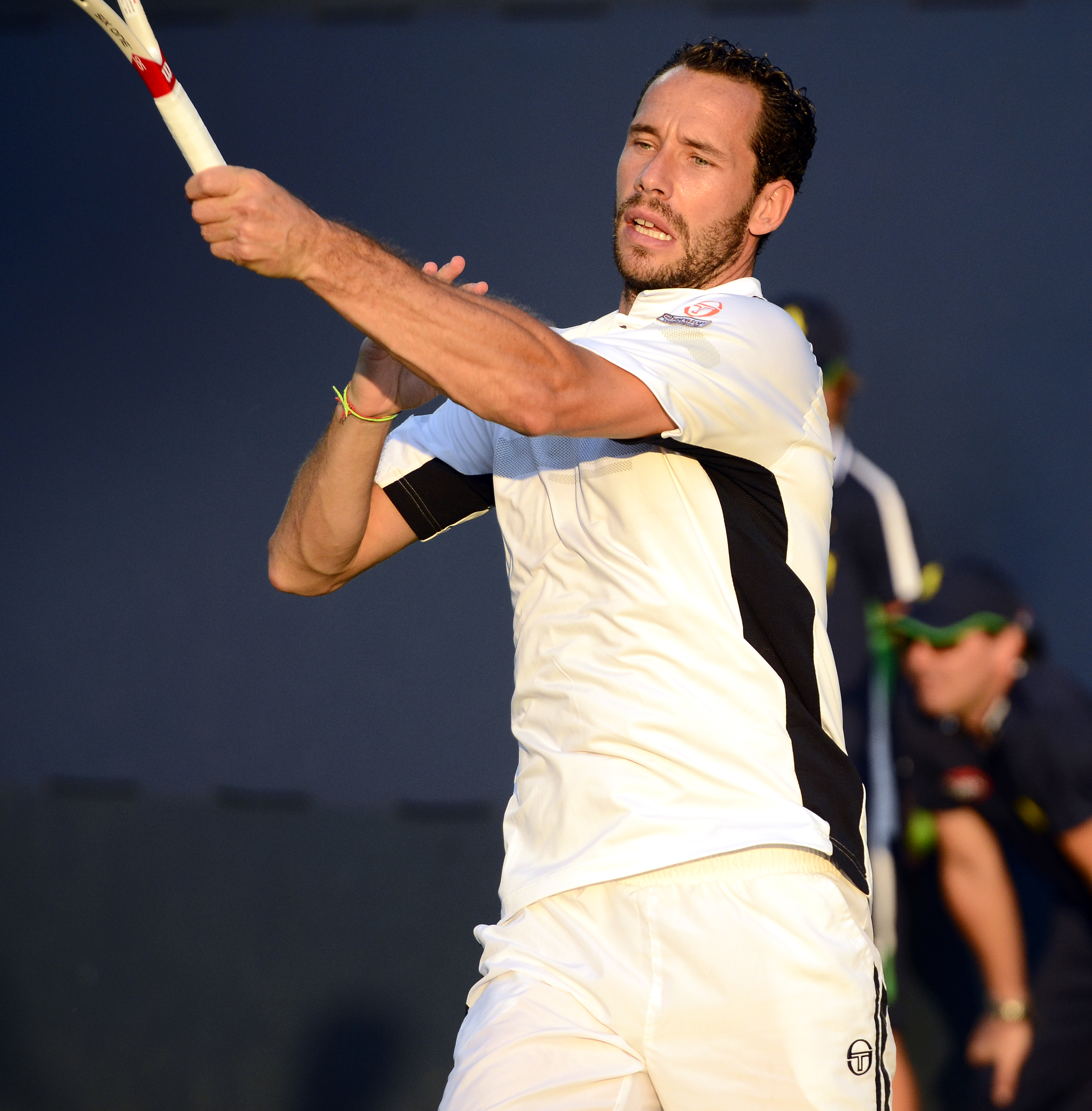
Llodra at 2014 US Open

Llodra was born in Paris, where his father Michel played for Paris Saint-Germain. A left-hander, his serve-and-volley style is modelled on that of his idol, Stefan Edberg.

Llodra and his wife Camille were married on 9 September 2003, and have two children, a daughter, Manon (born 23 March 2004) and a son, Teo (born 5 September 2007). He is a well-known supporter of French football club Paris Saint-Germain, and has often been seen wearing the club's shirt prior to tennis matches.

=== 2002 ===
Llodra reached his first Grand Slam final, the Australian Open men's doubles, with Fabrice Santoro. Unseeded, they lost to Mark Knowles and Daniel Nestor. During his semifinal, Llodra inadvertently hit and killed a bird flying across the court.

=== 2003 ===
Llodra won his first Grand Slam title, the Australian Open men's doubles, with Santoro. Their opponents in the final were once again Knowles and Nestor.

=== 2004 ===
Upon winning the men's doubles again for the second time at the Australian Open in 2004, Llodra and his tennis partner Santoro made headlines by stripping off their shirts, shoes, socks and shorts. Dressed in a pair of white briefs only, Llodra threw his clothes into the crowd, to the cheers of many onlookers.

Llodra made his first appearance in the fourth round of a Grand Slam singles tournament at that year's French Open. In the fourth round he led eventual semifinalist Tim Henman by two sets to love and had a match point in the fifth set before Henman prevailed. Llodra also won his first ATP singles title two weeks later at 's-Hertogenbosch.

=== 2005 ===
On 20 November 2005, Llodra again teamed with Santoro to win the Tennis Masters Cup in Shanghai, a competition which pitted the top eight doubles teams in the world against one another.

=== 2007 ===
In July, Llodra won the men's doubles title at Wimbledon partnering Arnaud Clément, defeating Bob and Mike Bryan to win his third Grand Slam doubles title. He and Clément were ecstatic, and Llodra once again celebrated by throwing his shirt, racket and towel into the crowd.

At the US Open, he and Clément were seeded seventh, but were upset in the second round by Jesse Levine and Alex Kuznetsov.

=== 2008 ===
Llodra and Clément reached a second Grand Slam final at the Australian Open, but lost to the Israeli pairing of Jonathan Erlich and Andy Ram.

In singles, Llodra won two tournaments in the course of two months, the first in Adelaide, where he defeated Jarkko Nieminen in the final, and the other in Rotterdam, where he edged out Robin Söderling in a third-set tiebreak.

Llodra and his doubles partner Clément then defeated the Bryan Brothers again in four sets at the Davis Cup quarterfinals tie against the US team. They are one of two teams to defeat the Bryans in Davis Cup.

He then entered the French Open, where he upset Tomáš Berdych in the second round and went on to reach the fourth round, losing to Latvian Ernests Gulbis in straight sets.

=== 2009 ===
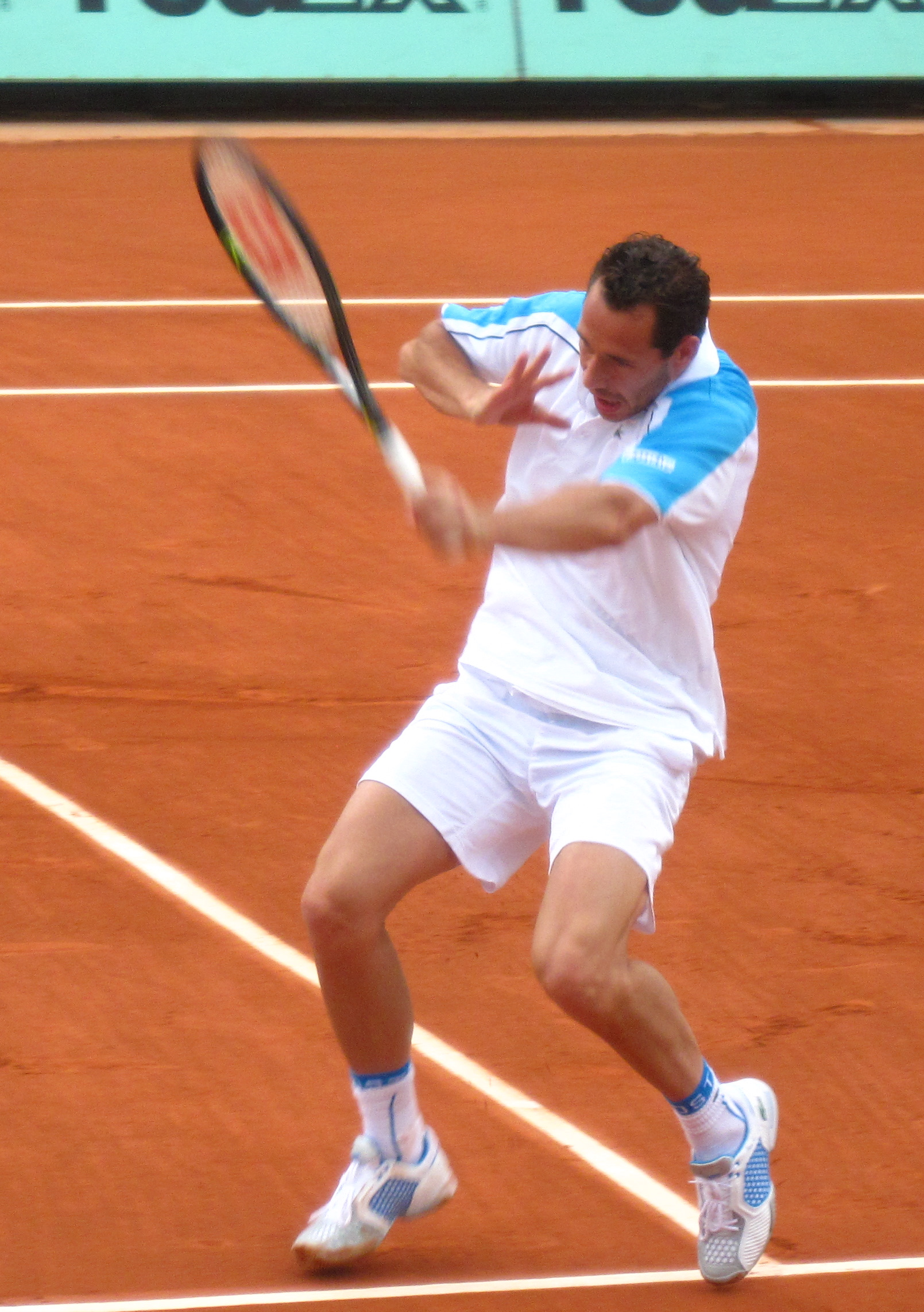
Llodra at the 2009 French Open.

In 2009, he made two finals in singles; the Open 13 in Marseille (l. to Tsonga) and the Grand Prix in Lyon (l. to Ljubicic). He had a poor season in doubles.

=== 2010 ===
Llodra started off the season with opening-round losses in Brisbane and Sydney. He made the second round of the Australian Open, losing to Juan Mónaco in five sets.

He lost to Marco Chiudinelli in the opening round in Rotterdam. The following week, he impressively won the Open 13 tournament in Marseille. He beat two well-known players on the rise: seventh seed Marcos Baghdatis (in the second round) and top seed Robin Söderling (in the quarterfinals). In the final, he defeated Julien Benneteau in straight sets in their first meeting on the ATP tour. Llodra and Benneteau also teamed up to win the doubles title in Marseille. Llodra also won at Eastbourne, beating Guillermo García-López in the final.

Llodra lost in the first round at the French Open, the second round at Wimbledon, and made the third round at the US Open before retiring against Tommy Robredo.

At the BNP Paribas Masters tournament in Paris-Bercy, he played his best tennis in an ATP Masters 1000 tournament, where he defeated second seed Novak Djokovic and then eleventh seed Nikolay Davydenko in the quarterfinals. Llodra then held three match points against world No. 5 and eventual champion Robin Söderling, but eventually lost in a third-set tiebreak. Had Llodra won, it would have been an all-French final in Paris with compatriot Gaël Monfils.

=== 2011 ===
At the Australian Open, Llodra and Zimonjic lost in the quarterfinals to Mahesh Bhupathi and Leander Paes. They reached the final in Rotterdam, but lost to Jürgen Melzer and Petzschner. They reached the semifinals in Dubai, but lost to Jérémy Chardy and Feliciano López, again in a super-tiebreak. They reached the quarterfinals in Miami, again losing to Bhupathi and Paes. In Madrid, they lost the final to the Bryan brothers. In Rome, they reached the quarterfinals, losing to Carlos Berlocq and Jarkko Nieminen.

The team made the semifinals at the French Open and at Wimbledon, losing to Max Mirnyi and Daniel Nestor in a match featuring two tiebreaks, and to the Bryan brothers in five sets. They won their first two titles of the year in Washington, D.C., and at the Canadian Open, against Robert Lindstedt and Horia Tecău and the Bryan brothers, respectively. They lost in the final in Cincinnati, again against Bhupathi and Paes.

They did not make it past the round of 16 at the US Open, but they took their third title of the year at the China Open, again against Lindstedt and Tecau. They lost in the final in Shanghai against Max Mirnyi and Nestor in a super-tiebreak. They took their fourth title together in Basel, again defeating Mirnyi and Nestor in the final.

They reached the quarterfinals in Bercy and participated in the 2011 ATP World Tour Finals in London, winning their first round-robin match against Rohan Bopanna and Aisam Qureshi.

In singles, Llodra reached the quarterfinals in Marseille, losing to Robin Söderling. He also reached the quarterfinals in Madrid, losing to finalist Rafael Nadal. He lost in the first round at the French Open and in the round of 16 at Wimbledon. In the US Open, he lost in the second round to Kevin Anderson in straight sets.

=== 2012 ===
At the BNP Paribas Masters in Paris (Bercy), Llodra reached the semifinals, after upsetting tenth and seventh seeds John Isner and Juan Martín del Potro, even though he was the lowest-ranked player in the draw. He also beat American Sam Querrey in the quarterfinals. He faced David Ferrer for a place in the final, but lost.

=== 2013 ===
At the Dubai Open, Llodra stunned world No. 8 and Australian Open 2008 finalist Jo-Wilfried Tsonga in straight sets, but lost to Dmitry Tursunov in the next round. Llodra was also in the men's doubles finals of the French Open with Nicolas Mahut, but lost to the Bryan brothers in the final.

=== 2014 ===
In 2014 Llodra played fewer tournaments and had less success in singles than the previous years. He suffered first-round losses at the Australian Open and French Open, and skipped Wimbledon. He did, however, get a win at the US Open, defeating Daniel Gimeno-Traver.

== Playing style ==
Llodra was known for his skilled net play. The Guardian journalist Xan Brooks described Llodra as "one of those talented, maddening French players in the tradition of Henri Leconte, Guy Forget and Fabrice Santoro; at once supremely gifted and curiously brittle" and that he "plays like he's just flown in from the 20th-century. His game is all dinks and slices and sly changes of pace." Two-time French Open finalist Robin Söderling called Llodra's serve "unbelievable" and his volleys the "best on the tour". To aid his touch on volleys, Llodra was one of the few professionals to use all natural gut strings, which gave him better feel at the expense of power at the baseline.

Llodra was one of the last remaining serve-and-volleyers in the top ranks of men's professional tennis, a tactic aided by his left-handed serve which allowed him to create unusual angles. Llodra has been called the 'best serve and volleyer in the world' by the website Essential Tennis.

== Significant finals ==
=== Grand Slam finals ===
==== Doubles: 7 (3 titles, 4 runner-ups) ====
Result	Year	Championship	Surface	Partner	Opponents	Score
Loss	2002	Australian Open	Hard	(France) Fabrice Santoro	(The Bahamas) Mark Knowles (Canada) Daniel Nestor	6–7^{(4–7)}, 3–6
Win	2003	Australian Open	Hard	(France) Fabrice Santoro	(The Bahamas) Mark Knowles (Canada) Daniel Nestor	6–4, 3–6, 6–3
Win	2004	Australian Open (2)	Hard	(France) Fabrice Santoro	(United States) Bob Bryan (United States) Mike Bryan	7–6^{(7–4)}, 6–3
Loss	2004	French Open	Clay	(France) Fabrice Santoro	(Belgium) Xavier Malisse (Belgium) Olivier Rochus	5–7, 5–7
Win	2007	Wimbledon	Grass	(France) Arnaud Clément	(United States) Bob Bryan (United States) Mike Bryan	6–7^{(5–7)}, 6–3, 6–4, 6–4
Loss	2008	Australian Open	Hard	(France) Arnaud Clément	(Israel) Jonathan Erlich (Israel) Andy Ram	5–7, 6–7^{(4–7)}
Loss	2013	French Open	Clay	(France) Nicolas Mahut	(United States) Bob Bryan (United States) Mike Bryan	4–6, 6–4, 6–7^{(4–7)}

=== Olympic finals ===
==== Doubles: 2 (1 Silver medal, 1 4th place) ====
Result	Year	Tournament	Surface	Partner	Opponents	Score
4th Place	2008	Summer Olympics	Hard	(France) Arnaud Clément	(United States) Bob Bryan (United States) Mike Bryan	6–3, 3–6, 4–6
Silver	2012	Summer Olympics	Grass	(France) Jo-Wilfried Tsonga	(United States) Bob Bryan (United States) Mike Bryan	4–6, 6–7^{(2–7)}

=== Year-end championships ===
==== Doubles: 2 (1 title, 1 runner-up) ====
Result	Year	Championship	Surface	Partner	Opponents	Score
Loss	2003	Tennis Masters Cup, Houston	Hard	(France) Fabrice Santoro	(United States) Bob Bryan (United States) Mike Bryan	7–6^{(8–6)}, 3–6, 6–3, 6–7^{(3–7)}, 4–6
Win	2005	Tennis Masters Cup, Shanghai	Carpet (i)	(France) Fabrice Santoro	(India) Leander Paes (Serbia and Montenegro) Nenad Zimonjić	6–7^{(6–8)}, 6–3, 7–6^{(7–4)}

=== Masters 1000 finals ===
==== Doubles: 11 (3 titles, 8 runner-ups) ====
Result	Year	Championship	Surface	Partner	Opponents	Score
Loss	2003	Monte-Carlo Masters	Clay	(France) Fabrice Santoro	(India) Mahesh Bhupathi (Belarus) Max Mirnyi	4–6, 6–3, 6–7^{(6–8)}
Loss	2003	Italian Open	Clay	(France) Fabrice Santoro	(Australia) Wayne Arthurs (Australia) Paul Hanley	1–6, 3–6
Loss	2003	Paris Masters	Carpet (i)	(France) Fabrice Santoro	(Australia) Wayne Arthurs (Australia) Paul Hanley	3–6, 6–1, 3–6
Win	2005	Italian Open	Clay	(France) Fabrice Santoro	(United States) Bob Bryan (United States) Mike Bryan	6–4, 6–2
Loss	2005	Hamburg Masters	Clay	(France) Fabrice Santoro	(Sweden) Jonas Björkman (Belarus) Max Mirnyi	6–4, 6–7^{(2–7)}, 6–7^{(3–7)}
Win	2006	Paris Masters	Carpet (i)	(France) Arnaud Clément	(France) Fabrice Santoro (Serbia) Nenad Zimonjić	7–6^{(7–4)}, 6–2
Loss	2010	Canadian Open	Hard	(France) Julien Benneteau	(United States) Bob Bryan (United States) Mike Bryan	5–7, 3–6
Loss	2011	Madrid Open	Clay	(Serbia) Nenad Zimonjić	(United States) Bob Bryan (United States) Mike Bryan	3–6, 3–6
Win	2011	Canadian Open	Hard	(Serbia) Nenad Zimonjić	(United States) Bob Bryan (United States) Mike Bryan	6–4, 6–7^{(5–7)}, [10–5]
Loss	2011	Cincinnati Masters	Hard	(Serbia) Nenad Zimonjić	(India) Mahesh Bhupathi (India) Leander Paes	6–7^{(4–7)}, 6–7^{(2–7)}
Loss	2011	Shanghai Masters	Hard	(Serbia) Nenad Zimonjić	(Belarus) Max Mirnyi (Canada) Daniel Nestor	6–3, 1–6, [10–12]

== ATP career finals ==
=== Singles: 10 (5 titles, 5 runner-ups) ===
Legend (pre/post 2009) Grand Slam tournaments (0–0) Tennis Masters Cup / ATP World Tour Finals (0–0) ATP Masters Series / ATP World Tour Masters 1000 (0–0) Olympic Games (0–0) ATP International Series Gold / ATP World Tour 500 Series (1–0) ATP International Series / ATP World Tour 250 Series (4–5)	Finals by surface Hard (3–4) Clay (0–0) Grass (2–1) Carpet (0–0)	Finals by setting Outdoor (3–2) Indoor (2–3)

Result	W–L	Date	Tournament	Tier	Surface	Opponent	Score
Loss	0–1	Jan 2004	Australian Hard Court Championships, Australia	International	Hard	(Slovakia) Dominik Hrbatý	4–6, 0–6
Win	1–1	Jun 2004	Rosmalen Grass Court Championships, Netherlands	International	Grass	(Argentina) Guillermo Coria	6–3, 6–4
Loss	1–2	Jun 2005	Rosmalen Grass Court Championships, Netherlands	International	Grass	(Croatia) Mario Ančić	5–7, 4–6
Win	2–2	Jan 2008	Australian Hard Court Championships, Australia	International	Hard	(Finland) Jarkko Nieminen	6–3, 6–4
Win	3–2	Feb 2008	Rotterdam Open, Netherlands	Intl. Gold	Hard (i)	(Sweden) Robin Söderling	6–7^{(3–7)}, 6–3, 7–6^{(7–4)}
Loss	3–3	Feb 2009	Open 13, France	250 Series	Hard (i)	(France) Jo-Wilfried Tsonga	5–7, 6–7^{(3–7)}
Loss	3–4	Nov 2009	Grand Prix de Tennis de Lyon, France	250 Series	Hard (i)	(Croatia) Ivan Ljubičić	5–7, 3–6
Win	4–4	Feb 2010	Open 13, France	250 Series	Hard (i)	(France) Julien Benneteau	6–3, 6–4
Win	5–4	Jun 2010	Eastbourne International, United Kingdom	250 Series	Grass	(Spain) Guillermo García López	7–5, 6–2
Loss	5–5	Feb 2012	Open 13, France	250 Series	Hard (i)	(Argentina) Juan Martín del Potro	4–6, 4–6

=== Doubles: 48 (26 titles, 22 runner-ups) ===
Legend (pre/post 2009) Grand Slam tournaments (3–4) Tennis Masters Cup / ATP World Tour Finals (1–1) ATP Masters Series / ATP World Tour Masters 1000 (3–8) Olympic Games (0–1) ATP International Series Gold / ATP World Tour 500 Series (6–1) ATP International Series / ATP World Tour 250 Series (13–7)	Finals by surface Hard (18–14) Clay (2–6) Grass (1–1) Carpet (5–1)	Finals by setting Outdoor (11–16) Indoor (15–6)

Result	W–L	Date	Tournament	Tier	Surface	Partner	Opponents	Score
Win	1–0	May 2000	Majorca Open, Spain	International	Clay	(Italy) Diego Nargiso	(Spain) Alberto Martín (Spain) Fernando Vicente	7–6^{(7–2)}, 7–6^{(7–3)}
Loss	1–1	Jan 2002	Australian Open, Australia	Grand Slam	Hard	(France) Fabrice Santoro	(The Bahamas) Mark Knowles (Canada) Daniel Nestor	6–7^{(4–7)}, 3–6
Loss	1–2	Jul 2002	Los Angeles Open, United States	International	Hard	(United States) Justin Gimelstob	(France) Sébastien Grosjean (Germany) Nicolas Kiefer	4–6, 4–6
Win	2–2	Jan 2003	Australian Open, Australia	Grand Slam	Hard	(France) Fabrice Santoro	(The Bahamas) Mark Knowles (Canada) Daniel Nestor	6–4, 3–6, 6–3
Loss	2–3	Apr 2003	Monte-Carlo Masters, Monaco	Masters Series	Clay	(France) Fabrice Santoro	(India) Mahesh Bhupathi (Belarus) Max Mirnyi	4–6, 6–3, 6–7^{(6–8)}
Loss	2–4	May 2003	Italian Open, Italy	Masters Series	Clay	(France) Fabrice Santoro	(Australia) Wayne Arthurs (Australia) Paul Hanley	1–6, 3–6
Loss	2–5	Oct 2003	Open de Moselle, France	International	Hard (i)	(France) Fabrice Santoro	(France) Julien Benneteau (France) Nicolas Mahut	6–7^{(2–7)}, 3–6
Loss	2–6	Nov 2003	Paris Masters, France	Masters Series	Carpet (i)	(France) Fabrice Santoro	(Australia) Wayne Arthurs (Australia) Paul Hanley	3–6, 6–1, 3–6
Loss	2–7	Nov 2003	Tennis Masters Cup, United States	Tour Finals	Hard	(France) Fabrice Santoro	(United States) Bob Bryan (United States) Mike Bryan	7–6^{(8–6)}, 3–6, 6–3, 6–7^{(3–7)}, 4–6
Loss	2–8	Jan 2004	Australian Hard Court Championships, Australia	International	Hard	(France) Arnaud Clément	(United States) Bob Bryan (United States) Mike Bryan	5–7, 3–6
Win	3–8	Jan 2004	Australian Open, Australia (2)	Grand Slam	Hard	(France) Fabrice Santoro	(United States) Bob Bryan (United States) Mike Bryan	7–6^{(7–4)}, 6–3
Loss	3–9	Jun 2004	French Open, France	Grand Slam	Clay	(France) Fabrice Santoro	(Belgium) Xavier Malisse (Belgium) Olivier Rochus	5–7, 5–7
Win	4–9	Aug 2004	Long Island Open, United States	International	Hard	(France) Antony Dupuis	(Switzerland) Yves Allegro (Germany) Michael Kohlmann	6–2, 6–4
Win	5–9	Oct 2004	St. Petersburg Open, Russia	International	Carpet (i)	(France) Arnaud Clément	(Slovakia) Dominik Hrbatý (Czech Republic) Jaroslav Levinský	6–3, 6–2
Loss	5–10	Jan 2005	Sydney International, Australia	International	Hard	(France) Arnaud Clément	(India) Mahesh Bhupathi (Australia) Todd Woodbridge	3–6, 3–6
Win	6–10	May 2005	Italian Open, Italy	Masters Series	Clay	(France) Fabrice Santoro	(United States) Bob Bryan (United States) Mike Bryan	6–4, 6–2
Loss	6–11	May 2005	Hamburg Masters, Germany	Masters Series	Clay	(France) Fabrice Santoro	(Sweden) Jonas Björkman (Belarus) Max Mirnyi	6–4, 6–7^{(2–7)}, 6–7^{(3–7)}
Win	7–11	Oct 2005	Open de Moselle, France	International	Hard (i)	(France) Fabrice Santoro	(Argentina) José Acasuso (Argentina) Sebastián Prieto	5–2, 3–5, 5–4^{(7–4)}
Win	8–11	Oct 2005	Grand Prix de Tennis de Lyon, France	International	Carpet (i)	(France) Fabrice Santoro	(South Africa) Jeff Coetzee (Netherlands) Rogier Wassen	6–3, 6–1
Win	9–11	Nov 2005	Tennis Masters Cup, China	Tour Finals	Carpet (i)	(France) Fabrice Santoro	(India) Leander Paes (Serbia and Montenegro) Nenad Zimonjić	6–7^{(6–8)}, 6–3, 7–6^{(7–4)}
Win	10–11	Nov 2006	Paris Masters, France	Masters Series	Carpet (i)	(France) Arnaud Clément	(France) Fabrice Santoro (Serbia) Nenad Zimonjić	7–6^{(7–4)}, 6–2
Win	11–11	Feb 2007	Open 13, France	International	Hard (i)	(France) Arnaud Clément	(The Bahamas) Mark Knowles (Canada) Daniel Nestor	7–5, 4–6, [10–8]
Win	12–11	Jul 2007	Wimbledon Championships, United Kingdom	Grand Slam	Grass	(France) Arnaud Clément	(United States) Bob Bryan (United States) Mike Bryan	6–7^{(5–7)}, 6–3, 6–4, 6–4
Loss	12–12	Sep 2007	Thailand Open, Thailand	International	Hard (i)	(France) Nicolas Mahut	(Thailand) Sanchai Ratiwatana (Thailand) Sonchat Ratiwatana	6–3, 5–7, [7–10]
Win	13–12	Oct 2007	Open de Moselle, France (2)	International	Hard (i)	(France) Arnaud Clément	(Poland) Mariusz Fyrstenberg (Poland) Marcin Matkowski	6–1, 6–4
Loss	13–13	Oct 2007	Stockholm Open, Sweden	International	Hard (i)	(France) Arnaud Clément	(Sweden) Jonas Björkman (Belarus) Max Mirnyi	4–6, 4–6
Loss	13–14	Jan 2008	Australian Open, Australia	Grand Slam	Hard	(France) Arnaud Clément	(Israel) Jonathan Erlich (Israel) Andy Ram	5–7, 6–7^{(4–7)}
Win	14–14	Mar 2008	Las Vegas Open, United States	International	Hard	(France) Julien Benneteau	(United States) Bob Bryan (United States) Mike Bryan	6–4, 4–6, [10–8]
Win	15–14	Oct 2008	Open de Moselle, France (3)	International	Hard (i)	(France) Arnaud Clément	(Poland) Mariusz Fyrstenberg (Poland) Marcin Matkowski	5–7, 6–3, [10–8]
Win	16–14	Oct 2008	Grand Prix de Tennis de Lyon, France (2)	International	Carpet (i)	(Israel) Andy Ram	(Australia) Stephen Huss (United Kingdom) Ross Hutchins	6–3, 5–7, [10–8]
Win	17–14	Feb 2009	Open 13, France (2)	250 Series	Hard (i)	(France) Arnaud Clément	(Austria) Julian Knowle (Israel) Andy Ram	3–6, 6–3, [10–8]
Loss	17–15	Oct 2009	Open de Moselle, France	250 Series	Hard (i)	(France) Arnaud Clément	(United Kingdom) Colin Fleming (United Kingdom) Ken Skupski	6–2, 4–6, [5–10]
Win	18–15	Feb 2010	Open 13, France (3)	250 Series	Hard (i)	(France) Julien Benneteau	(Austria) Julian Knowle (Sweden) Robert Lindstedt	6–4, 6–3
Loss	18–16	Aug 2010	Canadian Open, Canada	Masters 1000	Hard	(France) Julien Benneteau	(United States) Bob Bryan (United States) Mike Bryan	5–7, 3–6
Loss	18–17	Feb 2011	Rotterdam Open, Netherlands	500 Series	Hard (i)	(Serbia) Nenad Zimonjić	(Austria) Jürgen Melzer (Germany) Philipp Petzschner	4–6, 6–3, [5–10]
Loss	18–18	May 2011	Madrid Open, Spain	Masters 1000	Clay	(Serbia) Nenad Zimonjić	(United States) Bob Bryan (United States) Mike Bryan	3–6, 3–6
Win	19–18	Aug 2011	Washington Open, United States	500 Series	Hard	(Serbia) Nenad Zimonjić	(Sweden) Robert Lindstedt (Romania) Horia Tecău	6–7^{(3–7)}, 7–6^{(8–6)}, [10–7]
Win	20–18	Aug 2011	Canadian Open, Canada	Masters 1000	Hard	(Serbia) Nenad Zimonjić	(United States) Bob Bryan (United States) Mike Bryan	6–4, 6–7^{(5–7)}, [10–5]
Loss	20–19	Aug 2011	Cincinnati Masters, United States	Masters 1000	Hard	(Serbia) Nenad Zimonjić	(India) Mahesh Bhupathi (India) Leander Paes	6–7^{(4–7)}, 6–7^{(2–7)}
Win	21–19	Oct 2011	China Open, China	500 Series	Hard	(Serbia) Nenad Zimonjić	(Sweden) Robert Lindstedt (Romania) Horia Tecău	7–6^{(7–2)}, 7–6^{(7–4)}
Loss	21–20	Oct 2011	Shanghai Masters, China	Masters 1000	Hard	(Serbia) Nenad Zimonjić	(Belarus) Max Mirnyi (Canada) Daniel Nestor	6–3, 1–6, [10–12]
Win	22–20	Nov 2011	Swiss Indoors, Switzerland	500 Series	Hard (i)	(Serbia) Nenad Zimonjić	(Belarus) Max Mirnyi (Canada) Daniel Nestor	6–4, 7–5
Win	23–20	Feb 2012	Rotterdam Open, Netherlands	500 Series	Hard (i)	(Serbia) Nenad Zimonjić	(Sweden) Robert Lindstedt (Romania) Horia Tecău	4–6, 7–5, [16–14]
Loss	23–21	Aug 2012	Summer Olympics, United Kingdom	Olympics	Grass	(France) Jo-Wilfried Tsonga	(United States) Bob Bryan (United States) Mike Bryan	4–6, 6–7^{(2–7)}
Win	24–21	Feb 2013	Open Sud de France, France (3)	250 Series	Hard (i)	(France) Marc Gicquel	(Sweden) Johan Brunström (South Africa) Raven Klaasen	6–3, 3–6, [11–9]
Win	25–21	Mar 2013	Dubai Tennis Championships, United Arab Emirates	500 Series	Hard	(India) Mahesh Bhupathi	(Sweden) Robert Lindstedt (Serbia) Nenad Zimonjić	7–6^{(8–6)}, 7–6^{(8–6)}
Loss	25–22	Jun 2013	French Open, France	Grand Slam	Clay	(France) Nicolas Mahut	(United States) Bob Bryan (United States) Mike Bryan	4–6, 6–4, 6–7^{(4–7)}
Win	26–22	Feb 2014	Rotterdam Open, Netherlands	500 Series	Hard (i)	(France) Nicolas Mahut	(Netherlands) Jean-Julien Rojer (Romania) Horia Tecău	6–2, 7–6^{(7–4)}

== Performance timelines ==
Key
W	F	SF	QF	#R	RR	Q#	DNQ	A	NH

(W) winner; (F) finalist; (SF) semifinalist; (QF) quarterfinalist; (#R) rounds 4, 3, 2, 1; (RR) round-robin stage; (Q#) qualification round; (DNQ) did not qualify; (A) absent; (NH) not held; (SR) strike rate (events won / competed); (W–L) win–loss record.

=== Singles ===
Tournament	2000	2001	2002	2003	2004	2005	2006	2007	2008	2009	2010	2011	2012	2013	2014	W-L
Grand Slam tournaments
Australian Open	2R	A	1R	1R	A	1R	1R	1R	1R	1R	2R	2R	3R	1R	1R	5–13
French Open	1R	1R	1R	1R	4R	1R	1R	3R	4R	1R	1R	1R	2R	2R	1R	10–15
Wimbledon	2R	1R	1R	2R	1R	1R	A	2R	1R	2R	2R	4R	1R	2R	A	9–13
US Open	A	A	2R	A	4R	1R	A	2R	2R	1R	3R	2R	1R	1R	2R	10–11
Win–loss	2–3	0–2	1–4	1–3	6–3	0–4	0–2	4–4	4–4	1–4	4–4	5–4	3–4	2–4	1–3	34–52
ATP World Tour Masters 1000
Indian Wells	A	A	A	A	A	3R	A	2R	1R	2R	1R	3R	2R	2R	A	7–7
Miami	A	A	A	1R	A	1R	2R	3R	1R	1R	2R	3R	1R	2R	A	6–10
Monte Carlo	A	A	2R	A	A	1R	2R	Q1	1R	A	2R	1R	1R	A	2R	4–8
Rome	A	A	A	A	A	1R	A	1R	1R	A	2R	1R	1R	A	A	1–6
Hamburg	A	A	A	A	A	1R	A	A	2R	Held as Madrid (Clay)						1–2
Madrid (Clay)	Held as Hamburg									A	A	QF	1R	Q2	Q1	3–2
Canada	1R	1R	A	1R	1R	A	A	Q2	1R	Q2	3R	2R	A	1R	Q2	3–8
Cincinnati	A	A	A	A	1R	A	A	Q1	1R	Q1	1R	2R	A	A	Q1	1–4
Madrid (Hard)	A	A	A	A	A	A	A	A	1R	Held as Shanghai						0–1
Shanghai	Held as Madrid (Hard)									1R	1R	1R	A	A	A	0–3
Paris	1R	1R	A	A	1R	A	2R	A	A	1R	SF	1R	SF	1R	A	9–9
Win–loss	0–2	0–2	1–1	0–2	0–3	2–5	3–3	3–3	1–8	1–4	9–8	7–9	5–6	2–4	1–1	35–60
Career statistics
Titles	0	0	0	0	1	0	0	0	2	0	2	0	0	0	0	5
Finals	0	0	0	0	2	1	0	0	2	2	2	0	1	0	0	10
Year-end ranking	159	89	104	173	41	136	96	93	40	67	23	47	53	105	269	

=== Doubles ===
Tournament	1998	1999	2000	2001	2002	2003	2004	2005	2006	2007	2008	2009	2010	2011	2012	2013	2014	SR	W–L
Grand Slam tournaments
Australian Open	A	A	A	1R	F	W	W	QF	2R	1R	F	A	1R	QF	3R	1R	SF	2 / 13	35–11
French Open	A	2R	1R	QF	2R	3R	F	2R	3R	3R	1R	1R	3R	SF	QF	F	3R	0 / 16	32–16
Wimbledon	A	A	2R	3R	1R	3R	A	QF	A	W	A	A	QF	SF	3R	2R	SF	1 / 11	28–10
US Open	A	A	1R	1R	2R	SF	2R	1R	QF	2R	1R	QF	2R	3R	1R	3R	2R	0 / 15	19–13
Win–loss	0–0	1–1	1–3	5–4	7–4	14–3	12–2	7–4	5–3	9–3	5–3	3–2	6–3	13–4	7–4	8–4	11–3	3 / 55	114–51
ATP Masters Series
Indian Wells	A	A	A	A	2R	2R	A	2R	A	2R	2R	2R	QF	1R	1R	A	A	0 / 9	6–9
Miami	A	A	A	A	3R	2R	A	QF	2R	SF	QF	A	1R	QF	QF	2R	SF	0 / 11	17–11
Monte Carlo	A	A	Q1	A	1R	F	2R	SF	2R	1R	2R	A	A	1R	SF	A	2R	0 / 10	10–10
Rome	A	A	A	A	2R	F	QF	W	A	2R	2R	A	2R	QF	QF	A	A	1 / 9	12–7
Madrid (Stuttgart)	A	A	A	A	1R	A	A	SF	A	A	2R	A	A	F	2R	1R	2R	0 / 7	5–7
Canada	A	A	1R	A	1R	QF	SF	A	A	1R	1R	1R	F	W	A	2R	1R	1 / 11	12–10
Cincinnati	A	A	A	A	1R	QF	QF	SF	A	A	A	QF	2R	F	A	1R	2R	0 / 9	9–9
Shanghai	Not Held											1R	1R	F	A	A	A	0 / 3	3–3
Paris	A	A	2R	1R	QF	F	1R	1R	W	SF	SF	2R	2R	QF	1R	1R	A	1 / 14	18–13
Hamburg	A	A	A	A	A	A	A	F	2R	A	QF	NM1						0 / 3	6–3
Year-end ranking	383	271	93	67	28	12	12	9	36	17	18	49	29	5	33	24	26		

== Top 10 wins ==
Season	2000	2001	2002	2003	2004	2005	2006	2007	2008	2009	2010	2011	2012	2013	2014	Total
Wins	0	0	0	0	2	0	0	0	1	1	4	0	2	3	0	13

#	Player	Rank	Event	Surface	Rd	Score
2004
1.	(Argentina) Guillermo Coria	3	's-Hertogenbosch, Netherlands	Grass	F	6–3, 6–4
2.	(Russia) Marat Safin	8	St. Petersburg, Russia	Carpet (i)	QF	6–4, 6–1
2008
3.	(Russia) Nikolay Davydenko	4	Rotterdam, Netherlands	Hard (i)	2R	6–3, 7–5
2009
4.	(France) Gilles Simon	8	Marseille, France	Hard (i)	SF	7–6^{(7–5)}, 6–2
2010
5.	(Sweden) Robin Söderling	8	Marseille, France	Hard (i)	QF	7–6^{(7–2)}, 6–4
6.	(Spain) Fernando Verdasco	10	Davis Cup, Clermont-Ferrand, France	Hard (i)	RR	6–7^{(5–7)}, 6–4, 6–3, 7–6^{(7–2)}
7.	(Czech Republic) Tomáš Berdych	7	US Open, New York	Hard	1R	7–6^{(7–3)}, 6–4, 6–4
8.	(Serbia) Novak Djokovic	3	Paris, France	Hard (i)	3R	7–6^{(8–6)}, 6–2
2012
9.	(Serbia) Janko Tipsarević	9	Marseille, France	Hard (i)	SF	6–4, 7–6^{(12–10)}
10.	(Argentina) Juan Martín del Potro	8	Paris, France	Hard (i)	3R	6–4, 6–3
2013
11.	(Serbia) Janko Tipsarević	9	Montpellier, France	Hard (i)	2R	6–3, 7–6^{(7–4)}
12.	(France) Jo-Wilfried Tsonga	8	Dubai, United Arab Emirates	Hard	1R	7–6^{(7–3)}, 6–2
13.	(France) Richard Gasquet	10	Basel, Switzerland	Hard (i)	1R	6–4, 6–2

== Incidents ==
=== Bird ===
In the 2002 Australian Open men's doubles semifinal against Julien Boutter and Arnaud Clément, a small bird (identified as a house martin) flew into the court chasing a moth. It flew into the path of a hard-hit volley by Llodra. After an impromptu funeral ceremony led by Boutter, the match continued, with Llodra and Santoro eventually winning 6–3, 3–6, 12–10. Llodra remarked afterwards, "I didn't do it deliberately. But at least I saved the moth."

=== Nude in the locker ===
In the 2005 Key Biscayne tournament, Llodra was hiding nude in Ivan Ljubicic's locker. When Ljubicic discovered him, Llodra stated that he "tried to get his positive energy". In 2005 Ljubicic was playing his most successful season by then.

=== Accusation of racism ===
After his first round victory over Ernests Gulbis at the 2012 BNP Paribas Open at Indian Wells, during which Llodra was overheard by fans and journalists making racist and sexist comments to a female Gulbis fan, Llodra was fined $2500 by the ATP for his behaviour. He later admitted making the comments in interviews with French media and complained that the fine was too high. Llodra did not make matters better for himself during an interview with a reporter from the Chinese news Web site SINA.com, in which the Frenchman attempted to apologize for his remarks. "My words were not aimed at China," Llodra began. "I love Chinese — I can totally make love with a Chinese girl," he added, before being cut off by the A.T.P. official monitoring the interview. The journalist, who took offense at the remark, said that he did not find Llodra's apology sincere. This was not the first incident in which charges of racism have been leveled at Llodra. He denied his comments were racist during his 2011 French Open first round defeat at the hands of Belgian qualifier Steve Darcis, comparing the atmosphere on court to that of a north African souk while veteran Moroccan umpire Mohammed El Jennati was in the chair.
