= Julien Benneteau =

French tennis player (born 1981)

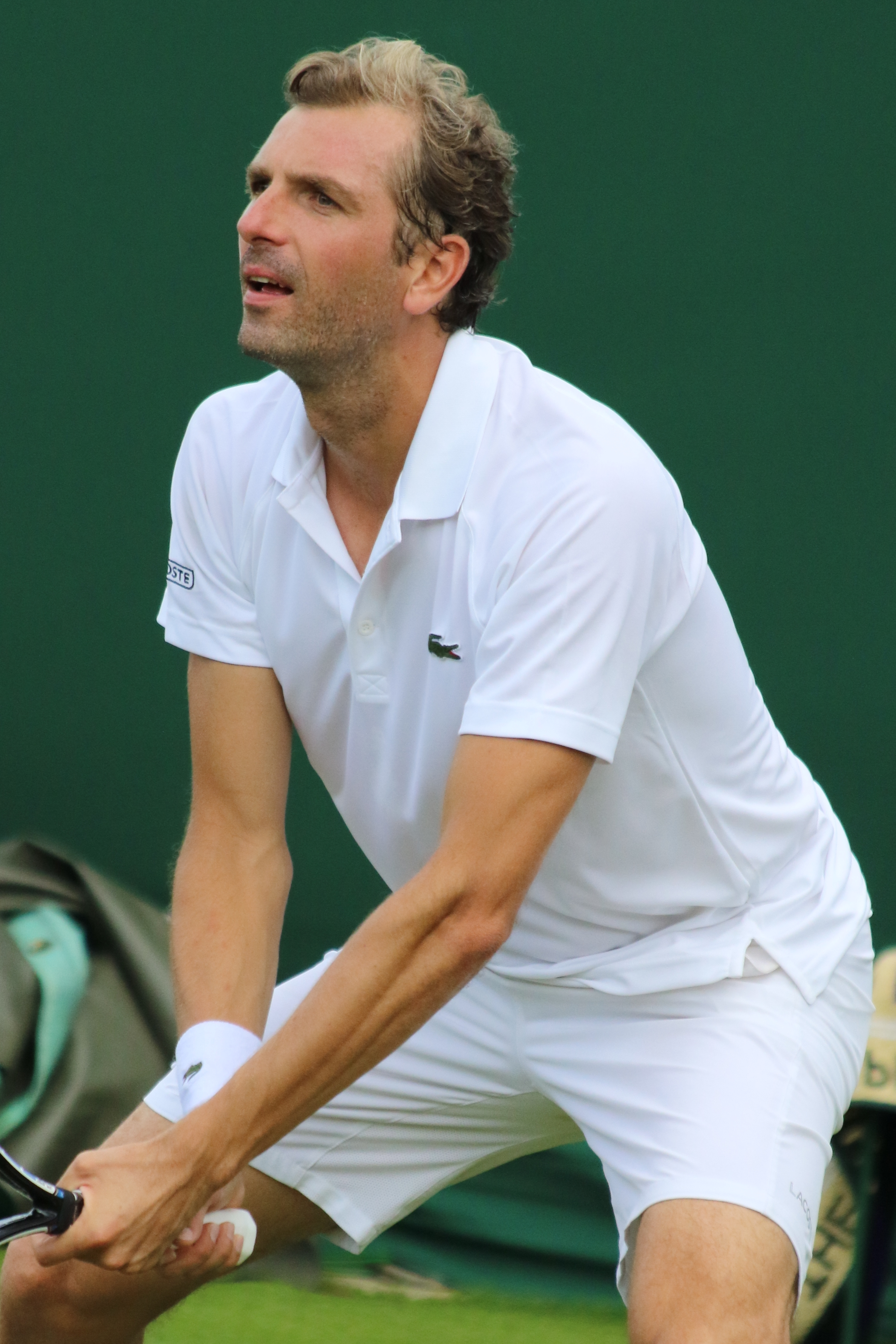
- Benneteau at the 2017 Wimbledon Championships
- Country (sports): France
- Residence: Geneva, Switzerland
- Born: 20 December 1981 (age 44) Bourg-en-Bresse, France
- Height: 1.85 m (6 ft 1 in)
- Turned pro: 2000
- Retired: 2018
- Plays: Right-handed (two-handed backhand)
- Prize money: US$9,556,742

Singles
- Career record: 273–297
- Career titles: 0
- Highest ranking: No. 25 (17 November 2014)

Grand Slam singles results
- Australian Open: 3R (2006, 2012, 2013, 2018)
- French Open: QF (2006)
- Wimbledon: 4R (2010)
- US Open: 3R (2009, 2011, 2012, 2013)

Other tournaments
- Olympic Games: 2R (2012)

Doubles
- Career record: 265–195
- Career titles: 12
- Highest ranking: No. 5 (3 November 2014)

Grand Slam doubles results
- Australian Open: QF (2007)
- French Open: W (2014)
- Wimbledon: F (2016)
- US Open: SF (2004, 2007)

Other doubles tournaments
- Tour Finals: SF (2014)

Team competitions
- Davis Cup: W (2017)
Medal record
Olympic Games
Bronze medal – third place	2012 London	Doubles

Julien Henry Guy Benneteau-Desgrois (French pronunciation: [ʒyljɛ̃ bɛnto]; born 20 December 1981) is a French retired professional tennis player. He achieved a career-high ATP singles ranking of No. 25 and doubles ranking of No. 5 in November 2014. Benneteau did not win a singles title, although he finished as runner-up in a record 10 ATP tournaments, including holding a match point in the 2013 Kuala Lumpur final. He reached the quarterfinals of the 2006 French Open and the semifinals of the 2014 Cincinnati Masters and 2017 Paris Masters (the latter as a wildcard).

Benneteau also had success in doubles, winning the bronze medal in men's doubles at the 2012 London Olympics (partnering Richard Gasquet) and the 2014 French Open men's doubles title with fellow Frenchman Édouard Roger-Vasselin, thus becoming the first team from France to win the men's doubles discipline in 30 years (after Yannick Noah and Henri Leconte won the title in 1984). Benneteau intended to retire from professional tennis after the 2018 US Open. However, due to an injury crisis he was asked by captain Yannick Noah to represent France in the Davis Cup semifinal in September 2018 against Spain. Benneteau teamed up with Nicolas Mahut to secure a decisive victory that took France to an unassailable 3–0 lead against Spain and into the final of the 2018 Davis Cup. Benneteau subsequently played several further events in singles and doubles, concluding his professional career on home soil at the Paris Masters.

Benneteau was the captain of France's Billie Jean King Cup team from 2019 until November 2025. Since November 2026, he is the tournament director of the Open Metz-Grand Est.

== Tennis career ==
=== Junior career ===
In the 1999 Orange Bowl Benneteau won the Boys 16s double title.

As a junior, Benneteau achieved a career-high ranking of No. 17 in singles and No. 1 in doubles in 1999.

Benneteau and Nicolas Mahut won the US Open Boys' Doubles title in 1999.

=== Professional career ===
At the 2006 French Open, Benneteau reached the quarterfinals by defeating Janko Tipsarević, Australian Open finalist Marcos Baghdatis, Radek Štěpánek, and Alberto Martín. There, he was defeated in straight sets by fourth-seeded Ivan Ljubičić of Croatia.

The Frenchman finished the 2008 season in the top 50 for the second time in three years. During the season, he reached two ATP finals, at Casablanca, where he lost to fellow countryman Gilles Simon, and in his final tournament of the season at Lyon, where he lost to Robin Söderling.

In May 2009, he entered the Interwetten Austrian Open in Kitzbühel as a lucky loser and reached his third career final, falling to Spain's Guillermo García López.

In the quarterfinals of the 2009 Western & Southern Financial Group Masters, he played a remarkable 53-shot rally with the then world no. 2 Andy Murray in the second set of a three-set loss. He lost the rally when he smashed a lob that grazed the net and went wide.

His best career victory was undoubtedly achieved on 11 November 2009 at the 2009 Paris Masters, when he scored a huge upset over world no. 1 Roger Federer in the second round in front of his home crowd.

He reached the third round of the 2012 French Open, losing to world no. 8 Janko Tipsarević.

In the third round of Wimbledon 2012, Benneteau led Federer by two sets before eventually being defeated in five sets. In the 2012 Olympics in London, he captured the bronze medal in doubles with Richard Gasquet.

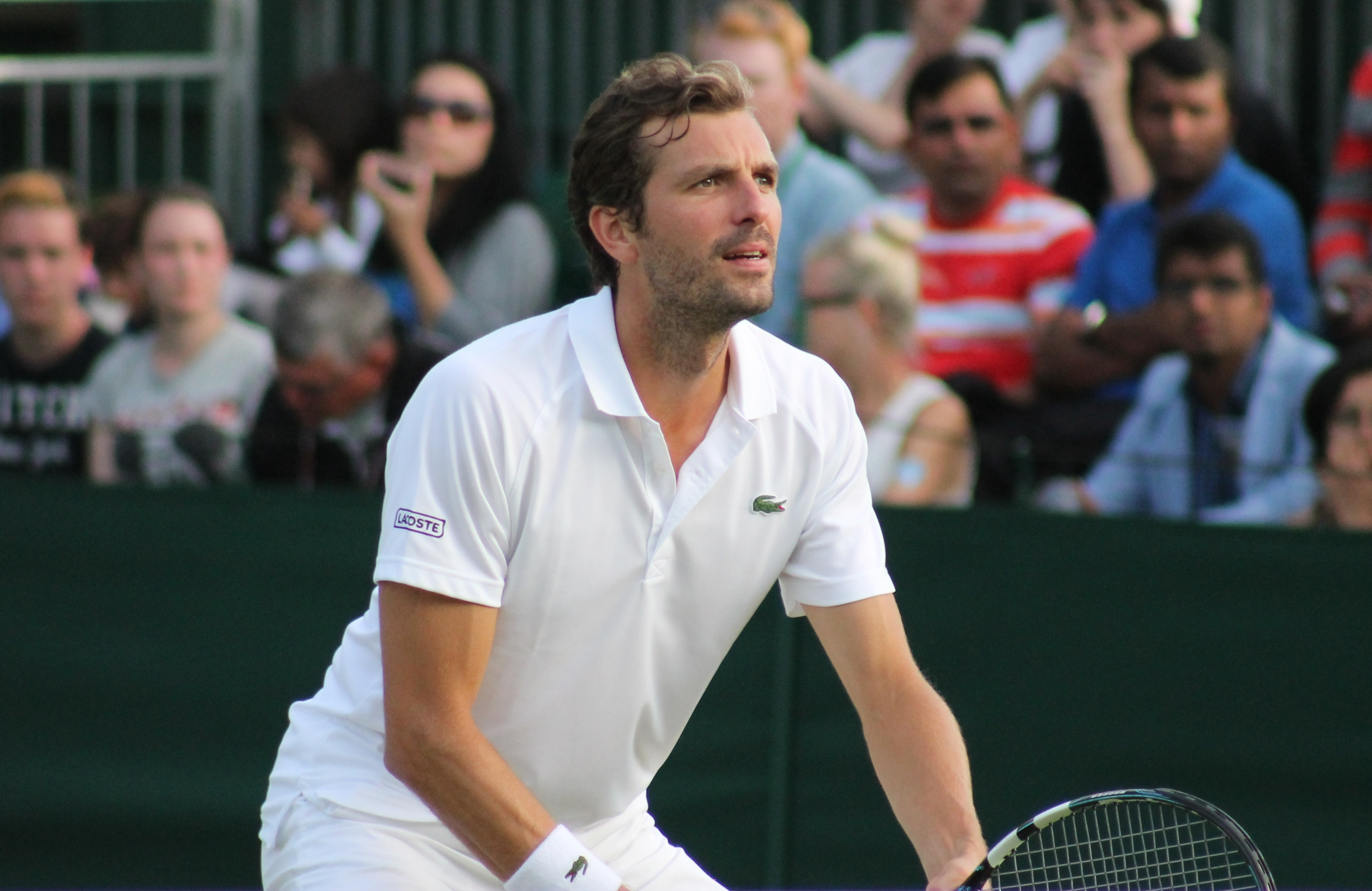
Wimbledon 2013

At the 2013 ABN AMRO Open in Rotterdam, Benneteau again beat top seed and defending champion Federer in the quarterfinals. He beat compatriot Gilles Simon in the semifinals, but was not able to overcome Juan Martín del Potro in the final, disappointingly failing yet again to clinch a title. During the clay season, he beat Nicolás Almagro at the Rome Masters, but lost to Benoît Paire in the second round. At Roland Garros he was 30th seed, he lost in the third round to Roger Federer.

At the Eastbourne grass tournament, the Frenchman beat Kevin Anderson in the first round, but lost to Bernard Tomic in the second round. At Wimbledon, he lost to Fernando Verdasco in the second round. Benneteau was defeated by Andy Murray in the third round of the Cincinnati Masters. At the US Open, he defeated Jérémy Chardy in the second round, but lost to Tomáš Berdych in the third round.

Benneteau reached the final of the 2013 Malaysian Open for the second year running after beating Stan Wawrinka, but was once again beaten in the final, this time by unseeded João Sousa in three sets. He had won the first set and was within a game of winning the title at 5–4 in the second set. At Valencia he won over Feliciano López in the first round, but lost to David Ferrer in the second round. He collected first-round losses at the Shanghai and Paris Masters.

In the 2014 season, Benneteau beat Jo-Wilfried Tsonga and Feliciano López to reach the Indian Wells Masters quarterfinals, where he lost to Novak Djokovic. At the Miami Masters, he won over Ernests Gulbis, but was defeated by Tommy Robredo. During the clay season, he claimed the Bordeaux Challenger, but lost to Facundo Bagnis in the first round of Roland Garros. At Eastbourne, Benneteau took wins over Yen-Hsun Lu and Gilles Simon, after which he lost to Sam Querrey in the quarterfinals. At Wimbledon, he again lost in the first round to Gilles Müller.

The Frenchman began the 2014 US Open Series with a second-round loss in Washington. At the Canada Masters, he defeated Lleyton Hewitt and Ernests Gulbis to reach the third round, where he was defeated by local Milos Raonic. Benneteau upset Stan Wawrinka to reach the Cincinnati Masters semifinals, where he lost to David Ferrer. At the US Open, he lost in the first round to Benoît Paire.

At the 2014 Malaysian Open, Benneteau defeated Pablo Cuevas in the quarterfinals and Ernests Gulbis in the semifinals to reach the finals for the third consecutive year where he lost again, to Kei Nishikori. At the Paris Masters in 2017, he reached the semifinals where he lost to Jack Sock. At the 2018 Australian Open he reached the third round where he lost to Fabio Fognini. At the 2018 French Open, he beat Leonardo Mayer before losing to fifth seed Juan Martín del Potro in the second round.

== Significant finals ==
=== Grand Slam finals ===
==== Doubles: 2 (1 title, 1 runner-up) ====
Result	Year	Championship	Surface	Partner	Opponents	Score
Win	2014	French Open	Clay	(France) Édouard Roger-Vasselin	(Spain) Marcel Granollers (Spain) Marc López	6–3, 7–6^{(7–1)}
Loss	2016	Wimbledon	Grass	(France) Édouard Roger-Vasselin	(France) Pierre-Hugues Herbert (France) Nicolas Mahut	4–6, 6–7^{(1–7)}, 3–6

=== Masters 1000 finals ===
==== Doubles: 6 (2 titles, 4 runners-up) ====
Result	Year	Tournament	Surface	Partner	Opponents	Score
Loss	2007	Monte-Carlo Masters	Clay	(France) Richard Gasquet	(United States) Bob Bryan (United States) Mike Bryan	2–6, 1–6
Win	2009	Shanghai Masters	Hard (i)	(France) Jo-Wilfried Tsonga	(Poland) Mariusz Fyrstenberg (Poland) Marcin Matkowski	6–2, 6–4
Loss	2010	Canadian Open	Hard	(France) Michaël Llodra	(United States) Bob Bryan (United States) Mike Bryan	5–7, 3–6
Loss	2011	Paris Masters	Hard (i)	(France) Nicolas Mahut	(India) Rohan Bopanna (Pakistan) Aisam-ul-Haq Qureshi	2–6, 4–6
Win	2013	Monte-Carlo Masters	Clay	(Serbia) Nenad Zimonjić	(United States) Bob Bryan (United States) Mike Bryan	4–6, 7–6^{(7–4)}, [14–12]
Loss	2014	Shanghai Masters	Hard	(France) Édouard Roger-Vasselin	(United States) Bob Bryan (United States) Mike Bryan	3–6, 6–7^{(3–7)}

=== Olympic medal matches ===
==== Doubles: 1 (1 bronze medal) ====
Result	Year	Championship	Surface	Partner	Opponents	Score
Bronze	2012	Summer Olympics, London	Grass	(France) Richard Gasquet	(Spain) David Ferrer (Spain) Feliciano López	7–6^{(7–4)}, 6–2

== ATP career finals ==
=== Singles: 10 (10 runners-up) ===
Legend Grand Slam tournaments (0–0) ATP World Tour Finals (0–0) ATP World Tour Masters 1000 (0–0) ATP World Tour 500 Series (0–1) ATP World Tour 250 Series (0–9)	Titles by surface Hard (0–7) Clay (0–2) Grass (0–0) Carpet (0–1)	Titles by setting Outdoor (0–4) Indoor (0–6)

Result	W–L	Date	Tournament	Tier	Surface	Opponent	Score
Loss	0–1	May 2008	Grand Prix Hassan II, Morocco	International	Clay	(France) Gilles Simon	5–7, 2–6
Loss	0–2	Oct 2008	Grand Prix de Tennis de Lyon, France	International	Carpet (i)	(Sweden) Robin Söderling	3–6, 7–6^{(7–5)}, 1–6
Loss	0–3	May 2009	Austrian Open, Austria	250 Series	Clay	(Spain) Guillermo García López	6–3, 6–7^{(1–7)}, 3–6
Loss	0–4	Feb 2010	Open 13, France	250 Series	Hard (i)	(France) Michaël Llodra	3–6, 4–6
Loss	0–5	Aug 2011	Winston-Salem Open, US	250 Series	Hard	(United States) John Isner	6–4, 3–6, 4–6
Loss	0–6	Jan 2012	Sydney International, Australia	250 Series	Hard	(Finland) Jarkko Nieminen	2–6, 5–7
Loss	0–7	Sep 2012	Malaysian Open, Malaysia	250 Series	Hard (i)	(Argentina) Juan Mónaco	5–7, 6–4, 3–6
Loss	0–8	Feb 2013	Rotterdam Open, Netherlands	500 Series	Hard (i)	(Argentina) Juan Martín del Potro	6–7^{(2–7)}, 3–6
Loss	0–9	Sep 2013	Malaysian Open, Malaysia	250 Series	Hard (i)	(Portugal) João Sousa	6–2, 5–7, 4–6
Loss	0–10	Sep 2014	Malaysian Open, Malaysia	250 Series	Hard (i)	(Japan) Kei Nishikori	6–7^{(4–7)}, 4–6

=== Doubles: 21 (12 titles, 9 runner-ups) ===
Legend Grand Slam tournaments (1–1) ATP World Tour Finals (0–0) ATP World Tour Masters 1000 (2–4) ATP World Tour 500 Series (1–2) ATP World Tour 250 Series (8–2)	Titles by surface Hard (9–5) Clay (2–1) Grass (0–2) Carpet (1–1)	Titles by setting Outdoor (5–6) Indoor (7–3)

Result	W–L	Date	Tournament	Tier	Surface	Partner	Opponents	Score
Win	1–0	Sep 2003	Open de Moselle, France	International	Hard (i)	(France) Nicolas Mahut	(France) Michaël Llodra (France) Fabrice Santoro	7–6^{(7–2)}, 6–3
Loss	1–1	Oct 2003	Grand Prix de Tennis de Lyon, France	International	Carpet (i)	(France) Nicolas Mahut	(Israel) Jonathan Erlich (Israel) Andy Ram	1–6, 3–6
Win	2–1	Oct 2006	Grand Prix de Tennis de Lyon, France	International	Carpet (i)	(France) Arnaud Clément	(Czech Republic) František Čermák (Czech Republic) Jaroslav Levinský	6–2, 6–7^{(3–7)}, [10–7]
Loss	2–2	Apr 2007	Monte-Carlo Masters, Monaco	Masters	Clay	(France) Richard Gasquet	(United States) Bob Bryan (United States) Mike Bryan	2–6, 1–6
Win	3–2	Mar 2008	Las Vegas Open, US	International	Hard	(France) Michaël Llodra	(United States) Bob Bryan (United States) Mike Bryan	6–4, 4–6, [10–8]
Win	4–2	Oct 2009	Shanghai Masters, China	Masters	Hard	(France) Jo-Wilfried Tsonga	(Poland) Mariusz Fyrstenberg (Poland) Marcin Matkowski	6–2, 6–4
Win	5–2	Nov 2009	Grand Prix de Tennis de Lyon, France (2)	250 Series	Hard (i)	(France) Nicolas Mahut	(France) Arnaud Clément (France) Sébastien Grosjean	6–4, 7–6^{(8–6)}
Win	6–2	Feb 2010	Open 13, France	250 Series	Hard (i)	(France) Michaël Llodra	(Austria) Julian Knowle (Sweden) Robert Lindstedt	6–4, 6–3
Loss	6–3	Aug 2010	Canadian Open, Canada	Masters 1000	Hard	(France) Michaël Llodra	(United States) Bob Bryan (United States) Mike Bryan	5–7, 3–6
Loss	6–4	Feb 2011	Open 13, France	250 Series	Hard (i)	(France) Jo-Wilfried Tsonga	(Netherlands) Robin Haase (United Kingdom) Ken Skupski	3–6, 7–6^{(7–4)}, [11–13]
Loss	6–5	Nov 2011	Paris Masters, France	Masters 1000	Hard (i)	(France) Nicolas Mahut	(India) Rohan Bopanna (Pakistan) Aisam-ul-Haq Qureshi	2–6, 4–6
Win	7–5	Apr 2013	Monte-Carlo Masters, Monaco	Masters	Clay	(Serbia) Nenad Zimonjić	(United States) Bob Bryan (United States) Mike Bryan	4–6, 7–6^{(7–4)}, [14–12]
Win	8–5	Aug 2013	Washington Open, US	500 Series	Hard	(Serbia) Nenad Zimonjić	(United States) Mardy Fish (Czech Republic) Radek Štěpánek	7–6^{(7–5)}, 7–5
Win	9–5	Feb 2014	Open 13, France (2)	250 Series	Hard (i)	(France) Édouard Roger-Vasselin	(Australia) Paul Hanley (United Kingdom) Jonathan Marray	4–6, 7–6^{(8–6)}, [13–11]
Win	10–5	Jun 2014	French Open, France	Grand Slam	Clay	(France) Édouard Roger-Vasselin	(Spain) Marcel Granollers (Spain) Marc López	6–3, 7–6^{(7–1)}
Loss	10–6	Oct 2014	China Open, China	500 Series	Hard	(Canada) Vasek Pospisil	(Netherlands) Jean-Julien Rojer (Romania) Horia Tecău	6–7^{(6–8)}, 7–5, [10–5]
Loss	10–7	Oct 2014	Shanghai Masters, China	Masters 1000	Hard	(France) Édouard Roger-Vasselin	(United States) Bob Bryan (United States) Mike Bryan	3–6, 6–7^{(1–7)}
Loss	10–8	Jul 2016	Wimbledon, UK	Grand Slam	Grass	(France) Édouard Roger-Vasselin	(France) Pierre-Hugues Herbert (France) Nicolas Mahut	4–6, 6–7^{(1–7)}, 3–6
Win	11–8	Feb 2017	Open 13, France (3)	250 Series	Hard (i)	(France) Nicolas Mahut	(Netherlands) Robin Haase (United Kingdom) Dominic Inglot	6–4, 6–7^{(9–11)}, [10–5]
Loss	11–9	Jun 2017	Queen's Club Championships, UK	500 Series	Grass	(France) Édouard Roger-Vasselin	(United Kingdom) Jamie Murray (Brazil) Bruno Soares	2–6, 3–6
Win	12–9	Sep 2017	Moselle Open, France	250 Series	Hard (i)	(France) Édouard Roger-Vasselin	(Netherlands) Wesley Koolhof (New Zealand) Artem Sitak	7–5, 6–3

== Performance timelines ==
Key
W	F	SF	QF	#R	RR	Q#	P#	DNQ	A	Z#	PO	G	S	B	NMS	NTI	P	NH

(W) winner; (F) finalist; (SF) semifinalist; (QF) quarterfinalist; (#R) rounds 4, 3, 2, 1; (RR) round-robin stage; (Q#) qualification round; (P#) preliminary round; (DNQ) did not qualify; (A) absent; (Z#) Davis/Fed Cup Zonal Group (with number indication) or (PO) play-off; (G) gold, (S) silver or (B) bronze Olympic/Paralympic medal; (NMS) not a Masters tournament; (NTI) not a Tier I tournament; (P) postponed; (NH) not held; (SR) strike rate (events won / competed); (W–L) win–loss record.

=== Singles ===
Tournament	2000	2001	2002	2003	2004	2005	2006	2007	2008	2009	2010	2011	2012	2013	2014	2015	2016	2017	2018	W–L
Grand Slam tournaments
Australian Open	A	A	A	1R	A	1R	3R	1R	1R	1R	2R	A	3R	3R	2R	1R	1R	Q3	3R	10–13
French Open	A	A	1R	1R	3R	1R	QF	1R	4R	1R	2R	2R	3R	3R	1R	A	1R	1R	2R	16–16
Wimbledon	A	A	A	A	2R	1R	2R	1R	1R	1R	4R	2R	3R	2R	1R	A	2R	1R	2R	11–14
US Open	A	A	A	1R	1R	A	1R	1R	1R	3R	2R	3R	3R	3R	1R	A	1R	1R	2R	10–14
Win–loss	0–0	0–0	0–1	0–3	3–3	0–3	7–4	0–4	3–4	2–4	6–4	4–3	8–4	7–4	1–4	0–1	1–4	0–3	5–4	47–57
ATP Masters Series
Indian Wells Masters	A	A	A	A	A	1R	3R	4R	1R	1R	2R	2R	2R	2R	QF	2R	A	1R	1R	10–13
Miami Masters	A	A	A	A	4R	2R	A	1R	4R	2R	2R	2R	3R	2R	3R	A	A	A	A	12–10
Monte Carlo Masters	A	A	A	2R	1R	1R	1R	2R	A	1R	2R	1R	3R	1R	2R	A	A	Q1	1R	6–12
Rome Masters	A	A	A	A	A	2R	A	1R	A	1R	2R	A	A	2R	A	A	1R	A	Q2	3–6
Madrid Masters	A	A	A	A	A	A	2R	A	A	1R	1R	A	A	1R	A	A	A	A	1R	1–5
Canada Masters	A	A	A	A	1R	A	3R	1R	1R	1R	2R	A	2R	1R	3R	A	A	A	A	6–9
Cincinnati Masters	A	A	A	A	A	A	1R	2R	1R	QF	3R	2R	1R	3R	SF	A	2R	Q1	A	13–10
Shanghai Masters	Not Masters Series									1R	A	A	A	1R	QF	A	A	A	A	3–3
Paris Masters	A	A	A	A	A	A	3R	A	A	3R	A	2R	2R	1R	2R	A	1R	SF	A	11–8
Hamburg Masters	A	A	A	A	A	A	A	2R	1R	Not Masters Series										1–2
Win–loss	0–0	0–0	0–0	1–1	3–3	2–4	7–6	6–7	3–5	5–9	5–7	4–5	5–6	3–9	17–7	0–1	1–3	4–2	0–3	66–78
Career statistics
	2000	2001	2002	2003	2004	2005	2006	2007	2008	2009	2010	2011	2012	2013	2014	2015	2016	2017	2018	Career
Tournaments	0	1	2	7	15	18	22	27	20	28	19	21	22	25	22	5	14	13	11	292
Titles–Finals	0–0	0–0	0–0	0–0	0–0	0–0	0–0	0–0	0–2	0–1	0–1	0–1	0–2	0–2	0–1	0–0	0–0	0–0	0–0	0 / 10
Overall win–loss	0–0	1–1	0–2	3–7	14–15	5–18	24–22	22–28	22–20	26–28	26–19	21–21	27–23	27–25	26–24	1–5	7–14	13–14	8–11	273–297
Year End Ranking	420	271	253	138	65	165	40	68	43	46	44	52	34	35	25	527	131	56	140	48%

=== Doubles ===
Tournament	2000	2001	2002	2003	2004	2005	2006	2007	2008	2009	2010	2011	2012	2013	2014	2015	2016	2017	2018	W–L
Grand Slam tournaments
Australian Open	A	A	A	A	2R	2R	1R	QF	3R	1R	2R	A	1R	3R	3R	QF	1R	2R	1R	16–14
French Open	2R	1R	2R	2R	1R	1R	QF	2R	A	3R	3R	3R	A	2R	W	A	QF	1R	A	23–14
Wimbledon	A	A	A	A	2R	1R	1R	1R	3R	A	QF	2R	1R	QF	QF	A	F	2R	1R	19–13
US Open	A	A	A	A	SF	QF	1R	SF	2R	1R	2R	A	QF	2R	1R	A	1R	QF	A	20–11
Win–loss	1–1	0–1	1–1	1–1	6–4	4–4	3–4	8–4	5–3	2–3	7–3	3–2	3–3	7–4	11–3	3–1	8–4	5–4	0–2	78–52
ATP Masters Series
Indian Wells Masters	A	A	A	A	A	1R	A	QF	1R	A	2R	2R	QF	2R	2R	1R	A	A	A	8–9
Miami Masters	A	A	A	A	A	1R	A	A	1R	QF	A	A	A	A	2R	A	A	A	A	3–4
Monte Carlo Masters	A	A	A	A	2R	1R	A	F	2R	A	A	2R	1R	W	QF	A	A	1R	A	13–8
Madrid Masters	A	A	A	A	A	A	A	A	A	A	A	A	A	1R	1R	A	A	A	A	0–2
Rome Masters	A	A	A	A	A	A	A	A	A	2R	1R	A	A	2R	A	A	SF	A	A	5–4
Canada Masters	A	A	A	A	A	A	A	1R	1R	A	F	A	1R	1R	1R	A	1R	A	A	4–7
Cincinnati Masters	A	A	A	A	A	A	A	2R	A	A	2R	A	1R	2R	SF	A	1R	A	A	4–6
Shanghai Masters	Not Masters Series									W	A	A	A	1R	F	A	1R	A	A	8–3
Paris Masters	1R	1R	A	1R	SF	QF	A	1R	A	2R	A	F	2R	2R	2R	A	2R	2R	1R	12–13
Hamburg Masters	A	A	A	A	A	A	A	QF	QF	Not Masters Series										4–2
Win–loss	0–1	0–1	0–0	0–1	3–2	1–4	0–0	9–6	3–5	9–2	6–4	6–3	3–5	8–7	9–8	0–1	4–5	1–2	0–1	62–58
Career statistics
Titles–Finals	0–0	0–0	0–0	1–2	0–0	0–0	1–1	0–1	1–1	2–2	1–2	0–2	0–0	2–2	2–4	0–0	0–1	2–3	0–0	12–21
Year End Ranking	200	304	268	94	50	59	67	26	48	32	38	52	97	26	5	124	35	45	326	

== Top 10 wins ==
- He has an 18–50 (.265) record against players who were, at the time the match was played, ranked in the top 10.

Season	2000	2001	2002	2003	2004	2005	2006	2007	2008	2009	2010	2011	2012	2013	2014	2015	2016	2017	2018	Total
Wins	0	0	0	0	0	0	3	1	1	2	1	1	1	2	3	0	0	2	1	18

#	Player	Rank	Event	Surface	Rd	Score
2006
1.	(United States) Andy Roddick	3	Memphis, United States	Hard (i)	QF	3–6, 6–4, 7–6^{(7–4)}
2.	(Cyprus) Marcos Baghdatis	10	Toronto, Canada	Hard	1R	5–7, 6–2, 6–3
3.	(Chile) Fernando González	8	Paris, France	Carpet (i)	2R	3–6, 6–4, 7–5
2007
4.	(United States) James Blake	6	Indian Wells, United States	Hard	3R	6–2, 7–6^{(7–1)}
2008
5.	(Spain) David Ferrer	5	Auckland, New Zealand	Hard	QF	6–4, 6–0
2009
6.	(Russia) Nikolay Davydenko	5	Rotterdam, Netherlands	Hard (i)	2R	6–3, 6–2
7.	(Switzerland) Roger Federer	1	Paris, France	Hard (i)	2R	3–6, 7–6^{(7–4)}, 6–4
2010
8.	(France) Jo-Wilfried Tsonga	9	Marseille, France	Hard (i)	SF	7–6^{(13–11)}, 5–7, 7–6^{(7–3)}
2011
9.	(Spain) Nicolás Almagro	10	US Open, New York, United States	Hard	1R	6–2, 6–4, 6–3
2012
10.	(Spain) David Ferrer	5	Kuala Lumpur, Malaysia	Hard (i)	SF	6–4, 6–1
2013
11.	(Switzerland) Roger Federer	2	Rotterdam, Netherlands	Hard (i)	QF	6–3, 7–5
12.	(Switzerland) Stan Wawrinka	10	Kuala Lumpur, Malaysia	Hard (i)	SF	6–4, 6–3
2014
13.	(France) Jo-Wilfried Tsonga	10	Indian Wells, United States	Hard	2R	6–4, 6–4
14.	(Switzerland) Stan Wawrinka	4	Cincinnati, United States	Hard	QF	1–6, 6–1, 6–2
15.	(Bulgaria) Grigor Dimitrov	10	Shanghai, China	Hard	2R	7–5, 6–3
2017
16.	(Belgium) David Goffin	10	Paris, France	Hard (i)	3R	6–3, 6–3
17.	(Croatia) Marin Čilić	5	Paris, France	Hard (i)	QF	7–6^{(7–5)}, 7–5
2018
18.	(Belgium) David Goffin	7	Australian Open, Melbourne, Australia	Hard	2R	1–6, 7–6^{(7–5)}, 6–1, 7–6^{(7–4)}
