= 2025 Open 13 Provence – Doubles =

Doubles
- 2025 Open 13 Provence

Final
- Champions: (France) Benjamin Bonzi (France) Pierre-Hugues Herbert
- Runners-up: (Belgium) Sander Gillé (Poland) Jan Zieliński
- Score: 6–3, 6–4

Events
| Singles | Doubles |
| ← 2024 · | Open 13 Provence | · 2026 → |

Benjamin Bonzi and Pierre-Hugues Herbert defeated Sander Gillé and Jan Zieliński in the final, 6–3, 6–4 to win the doubles tennis title at the 2025 Open 13 Provence. It was the first ATP Tour doubles title for Bonzi and 24th (and first since 2022) for Herbert.

Tomáš Macháč and Zhang Zhizhen were the reigning champions, but did not participate this year.

== Seeds ==
1. (Monaco) Hugo Nys / (France) Édouard Roger-Vasselin (semifinals)
2. (Belgium) Sander Gillé / (Poland) Jan Zieliński (final)
3. (Sweden) André Göransson / (Netherlands) Sem Verbeek (semifinals)
4. (Netherlands) Sander Arends / (United Kingdom) Luke Johnson (first round)

== Draw ==
=== Key ===
- Q = Qualifier
- WC = Wild card
- LL = Lucky loser
- Alt = Alternate
- SE = Special exempt
- PR = Protected ranking
- ITF = ITF entry
- JE = Junior exempt
- w/o = Walkover
- r = Retired
- d = Defaulted
- SR = Special ranking

=== Draw ===
First round
1 | (Monaco) H Nys (France) É Roger-Vasselin | 6 | 7
(Netherlands) R Haase (Germany) H Jebens | 1 | 5
(Germany) J Schnaitter (Germany) M Wallner | 4 | 4
(Czech Republic) P Nouza (Czech Republic) P Rikl | 6 | 6
4 | (Netherlands) S Arends (United Kingdom) L Johnson | 6 | 6^{5} | [15]
(Poland) K Drzewiecki (Poland) P Matuszewski | 1 | 7^{7} | [17]
WC | (France) B Bonzi (France) P-H Herbert | 6 | 6
(France) Q Halys (Ukraine) D Molchanov | 3 | 1
(France) M Guinard (Belgium) J Vliegen | 6 | 2 | [11]
(Belgium) Z Bergs (Portugal) N Borges | 4 | 6 | [9]
(United States) R Stalder (United Kingdom) M Willis | 4 | 2
3 | (Sweden) A Göransson (Netherlands) S Verbeek | 6 | 6
PR | (Netherlands) D Pel (United States) P Trhac | 7 | 2 | [6]
(India) Y Bhambri (Netherlands) M Middelkoop | 5 | 6 | [10]
Alt | (Poland) K Majchrzak (Poland) S Walków | 6 | 6^{7} | [3]
2 | (Belgium) S Gillé (Poland) J Zieliński | 3 | 7^{9} | [10]

Quarterfinals
1 | (Monaco) H Nys (France) É Roger-Vasselin | 6 | 6^{4} | [10]
(Czech Republic) P Nouza (Czech Republic) P Rikl | 3 | 7^{7} | [5]
(Poland) K Drzewiecki (Poland) P Matuszewski | 7^{7} | 4 | [6]
WC | (France) B Bonzi (France) P-H Herbert | 6^{2} | 6 | [10]
(France) M Guinard (Belgium) J Vliegen | 6^{10} | 4
3 | (Sweden) A Göransson (Netherlands) S Verbeek | 7^{12} | 6
(India) Y Bhambri (Netherlands) M Middelkoop | 3 | 4
2 | (Belgium) S Gillé (Poland) J Zieliński | 6 | 6

Semifinals
1 | (Monaco) H Nys (France) É Roger-Vasselin | 4 | 7^{7} | [7]
WC | (France) B Bonzi (France) P-H Herbert | 6 | 6^{5} | [10]
3 | (Sweden) A Göransson (Netherlands) S Verbeek | 6^{6} | 3
2 | (Belgium) S Gillé (Poland) J Zieliński | 7^{8} | 6

Final
WC | (France) B Bonzi (France) P-H Herbert | 6 | 6
2 | (Belgium) S Gillé (Poland) J Zieliński | 3 | 4
