= 2024 Open 13 Provence =

Men's tennis tournament in Marseille, France

Coordinates: 43.2710°N 5.4010°E

- Date: 5–11 February
- Edition: 32nd
- Category: ATP 250 Series
- Draw: 28S / 16D
- Prize money: €724,015
- Surface: Hard (indoor)
- Location: Marseille, France
- Venue: Palais des Sports de Marseille

Champions

Singles
- (France) Ugo Humbert

Doubles
- (Czech Republic) Tomáš Macháč / (China) Zhang Zhizhen
- Open 13 Provence

The 2024 Open 13 Provence was a men's tennis tournament played on indoor hard courts. It was the 32nd edition of the Open 13, and part of the ATP Tour 250 series of the 2024 ATP Tour. It took place at the Palais des Sports de Marseille in Marseille, France, from 5 through 11 February 2024.

== Finals ==
=== Singles ===
(France) Ugo Humbert defeated (Bulgaria) Grigor Dimitrov, 6–4, 6–3

- It was Humbert's 1st singles title of the year and the 5th of his career.

=== Doubles ===
(Czech Republic) Tomáš Macháč / (China) Zhang Zhizhen defeated (Finland) Patrik Niklas-Salminen / (Finland) Emil Ruusuvuori, 6–3, 6–4

== Singles main-draw entrants ==
=== Seeds ===
Country	Player	Rank^{1}	Seed
POL	Hubert Hurkacz	8	1
BUL	Grigor Dimitrov	13	2
	Karen Khachanov	18	3
FRA	Ugo Humbert	21	4
ESP	Alejandro Davidovich Fokina	23	5
ITA	Lorenzo Musetti	26	6
CAN	Félix Auger-Aliassime	30	7
CZE	Jiří Lehečka	31	8

- Rankings are as of 29 January 2024.

=== Other entrants ===
The following players received wildcards into the main draw:

- (France) Benjamin Bonzi
- (France) Quentin Halys
- (Canada) Denis Shapovalov

The following players received entry as an alternates:

- (Germany) Maximilian Marterer
- (France) Arthur Rinderknech

The following player received a Late Entry into the main draw:

- (Spain) Roberto Bautista Agut

The following players received entry from the qualifying draw:

- (United States) Maxime Cressy
- (France) Hugo Gaston
- (France) Hugo Grenier
- (Belgium) David Goffin

The following player received entry as a lucky loser:

- (Italy) Giulio Zeppieri

=== Withdrawals ===
- (Hungary) Fábián Marozsán → replaced by (Germany) Maximilian Marterer
- (Italy) Jannik Sinner → replaced by (France) Alexandre Müller → replaced by (Italy) Giulio Zeppieri
- (Italy) Lorenzo Sonego → replaced by (France) Richard Gasquet
- (Germany) Jan-Lennard Struff → replaced by (France) Grégoire Barrère

== Doubles main-draw entrants ==
=== Seeds ===
Country	Player	Country	Player	Rank^{1}	Seed
NED	Jean-Julien Rojer	NZL	Michael Venus	37	1
FIN	Harri Heliövaara	AUS	John Peers	75	2
AUT	Alexander Erler	AUT	Lucas Miedler	76	3
IND	Yuki Bhambri	NED	Robin Haase	101	4

- ^{1} Rankings are as of 29 January 2024.

=== Other entrants ===
The following pairs received wildcards into the doubles main draw:

- (France) Pierre-Hugues Herbert / (France) Grégoire Jacq
- ~~(France) Harold Mayot / (France) Lucas Pouille~~

The following pair received entry as alternates:

- (Netherlands) Sander Arends / (Netherlands) Sem Verbeek

=== Withdrawals ===
- (Uruguay) Ariel Behar / (Czech Republic) Adam Pavlásek → replaced by (Netherlands) Bart Stevens / (Greece) Petros Tsitsipas
- (Belgium) Sander Gillé / (Belgium) Joran Vliegen → replaced by (Finland) Patrik Niklas-Salminen / (Finland) Emil Ruusuvuori
- (United Kingdom) Lloyd Glasspool / (Netherlands) Jean-Julien Rojer → replaced by (Netherlands) Jean-Julien Rojer / (New Zealand) Michael Venus
- (Germany) Kevin Krawietz / (Germany) Tim Pütz → replaced by (United States) Vasil Kirkov / (United States) Sebastian Korda
- (France) Harold Mayot / (France) Lucas Pouille → replaced by (Netherlands) Sander Arends / (Netherlands) Sem Verbeek
- (United Kingdom) Jamie Murray / (New Zealand) Michael Venus → replaced by Ivan Liutarevich / (Kazakhstan) Alexander Shevchenko
