= 2023 Open 13 Provence – Doubles =

Doubles
- 2023 Open 13 Provence

Final
- Champions: (Mexico) Santiago González (France) Édouard Roger-Vasselin
- Runners-up: (France) Nicolas Mahut (France) Fabrice Martin
- Score: 4–6, 7–6^{(7–4)}, [10–7]

Events
Singles	Doubles
← 2022 ·	Open 13	· 2024 →

Santiago González and Édouard Roger-Vasselin defeated Nicolas Mahut and Fabrice Martin in the final, 4–6, 7–6^{(7–4)}, [10–7] to win the doubles tennis title at the 2023 Open 13.

Denys Molchanov and Andrey Rublev were the reigning champions, but Rublev chose to compete in Doha instead. Molchanov partnered Jonathan Eysseric, but lost in the quarterfinals to Mahut and Martin.

== Seeds ==
1. (Mexico) Santiago González / (France) Édouard Roger-Vasselin (champions)
2. (France) Nicolas Mahut / (France) Fabrice Martin (final)
3. (Belgium) Sander Gillé / (Belgium) Joran Vliegen (first round)
4. (United Kingdom) Julian Cash / (United Kingdom) Henry Patten (withdrew)
5. (Netherlands) Sander Arends / (Netherlands) David Pel (first round)

== Draw ==
=== Key ===
- Q = Qualifier
- WC = Wild card
- LL = Lucky loser
- Alt = Alternate
- ITF = ITF entry
- PR = Protected ranking
- SR = Special ranking
- SE = Special exempt
- JE = Junior exempt
- JR = Junior Accelerator Programme entrant
- CO = College Accelerator Programme entrant
- NG = Next Gen Accelerator Program entrant
- w/o = Walkover
- r = Retired
- d = Defaulted

=== Draw ===
First round
1	(Mexico) S González (France) É Roger-Vasselin	6	6
(France) B Bonzi (France) A Rinderknech	0	4
WC	(France) L Sanchez (Greece) Pe Tsitsipas	6	7^{7}
(France) G Barrère (France) A Olivetti	1	6^{1}
3	(Belgium) S Gillé (Belgium) J Vliegen	5	7	[7]
(India) S Balaji (India) J Nedunchezhiyan	7	5	[10]
(Jamaica) D Brown (Pakistan) A-u-H Qureshi	4	6	[10]
(Austria) P Oswald (Poland) S Walków	6	3	[8]
(Italy) M Bortolotti (Spain) S Martos Gornés	6	2	[7]
(Belgium) Z Bergs (Belgium) D Goffin	3	6	[10]
Alt	(Monaco) R Arneodo (Austria) S Weissborn	6	6
5	(Netherlands) S Arends (Netherlands) D Pel	3	3
(France) J Eysseric (Ukraine) D Molchanov	3	7	[10]
WC	(France) A Fils (France) L Van Assche	6	5	[4]
(Australia) A Harris (Australia) J-P Smith	6^{6}	2
2	(France) N Mahut (France) F Martin	7^{8}	6

Quarterfinals
1	(Mexico) S González (France) É Roger-Vasselin	6	6
WC	(France) L Sanchez (Greece) Pe Tsitsipas	2	4
(India) S Balaji (India) J Nedunchezhiyan	3	7^{7}	[13]
(Jamaica) D Brown (Pakistan) A-u-H Qureshi	6	6^{4}	[11]
(Belgium) Z Bergs (Belgium) D Goffin
Alt	(Monaco) R Arneodo (Austria) S Weissborn	w/o
(France) J Eysseric (Ukraine) D Molchanov	3	4
2	(France) N Mahut (France) F Martin	6	6

Semifinals
1	(Mexico) S González (France) É Roger-Vasselin	4	7	[10]
(India) S Balaji (India) J Nedunchezhiyan	6	5	[7]
Alt	(Monaco) R Arneodo (Austria) S Weissborn	5	5
2	(France) N Mahut (France) F Martin	7	7

Final
1	(Mexico) S González (France) É Roger-Vasselin	4	7^{7}	[10]
2	(France) N Mahut (France) F Martin	6	6^{4}	[7]
