= 2024 Open 13 Provence – Doubles =

Doubles
- 2024 Open 13 Provence

Final
- Champions: (Czech Republic) Tomáš Macháč (China) Zhang Zhizhen
- Runners-up: (Finland) Patrik Niklas-Salminen (Finland) Emil Ruusuvuori
- Score: 6–3, 6–4

Events
Singles	Doubles
← 2023 ·	Open 13	· 2025 →

Tomáš Macháč and Zhang Zhizhen defeated Patrik Niklas-Salminen and Emil Ruusuvuori in the final, 6–3, 6–4 to win the doubles tennis title at the 2024 Open 13 Provence. It was both players' first ATP Tour title, and Zhang became the first Chinese player to win an ATP Tour doubles title.

Santiago González and Édouard Roger-Vasselin were the reigning champions, but Roger-Vasselin chose not to participate this year and González chose to compete in Dallas instead.

== Seeds ==
1. (Netherlands) Jean-Julien Rojer / (New Zealand) Michael Venus (first round)
2. (Finland) Harri Heliövaara / (Australia) John Peers (quarterfinals)
3. (Austria) Alexander Erler / (Austria) Lucas Miedler (semifinals, retired)
4. (India) Yuki Bhambri / (Netherlands) Robin Haase (first round)

== Draw ==
=== Key ===
- Q = Qualifier
- WC = Wild card
- LL = Lucky loser
- Alt = Alternate
- ITF = ITF entry
- PR = Protected ranking
- SR = Special ranking
- SE = Special exempt
- JE = Junior exempt
- JR = Junior Accelerator Programme entrant
- CO = College Accelerator Programme entrant
- NG = Next Gen Accelerator Program entrant
- w/o = Walkover
- r = Retired
- d = Defaulted

=== Draw ===
First round
1	(Netherlands) J-J Rojer (New Zealand) M Venus	5	3
(Germany) A Mies (Australia) J-P Smith	7	6
(Finland) P Niklas-Salminen (Finland) E Ruusuvuori	6	7^{7}
(Monaco) R Arneodo (France) J Eysseric	2	6^{4}
3	(Austria) A Erler (Austria) L Miedler	4	7	[11]
(Serbia) N Ćaćić (Ukraine) D Molchanov	6	5	[9]
(France) A Olivetti (Austria) S Weissborn	4	6	[8]
(Netherlands) B Stevens (Greece) Pe Tsitsipas	6	4	[10]
Alt	(Netherlands) S Arends (Netherlands) S Verbeek	6	6
I Liutarevich (Kazakhstan) A Shevchenko	0	1
(United States) V Kirkov (United States) S Korda	1	6	[12]
4	(India) Y Bhambri (Netherlands) R Haase	6	4	[10]
(Czech Republic) T Macháč (China) Z Zhang	6	6
(Germany) C Frantzen (Germany) H Jebens	4	3
WC	(France) P-H Herbert (France) G Jacq	2	3
2	(Finland) H Heliövaara (Australia) J Peers	6	6

Quarterfinals
(Germany) A Mies (Australia) J-P Smith	4	4
(Finland) P Niklas-Salminen (Finland) E Ruusuvuori	6	6
3	(Austria) A Erler (Austria) L Miedler	6	6
(Netherlands) B Stevens (Greece) Pe Tsitsipas	2	3
Alt	(Netherlands) S Arends (Netherlands) S Verbeek	7	3	[8]
(United States) V Kirkov (United States) S Korda	5	6	[10]
(Czech Republic) T Macháč (China) Z Zhang	6	3	[10]
2	(Finland) H Heliövaara (Australia) J Peers	4	6	[6]

Semifinals
(Finland) P Niklas-Salminen (Finland) E Ruusuvuori	4
3	(Austria) A Erler (Austria) L Miedler	2^{r}
(United States) V Kirkov (United States) S Korda	7^{7}	3	[7]
(Czech Republic) T Macháč (China) Z Zhang	6^{2}	6	[10]

Final
(Finland) P Niklas-Salminen (Finland) E Ruusuvuori	3	4
(Czech Republic) T Macháč (China) Z Zhang	6	6
