= 2023 Open 13 Provence – Singles =

Singles
- 2023 Open 13 Provence

Final
- Champion: (Poland) Hubert Hurkacz
- Runner-up: (France) Benjamin Bonzi
- Score: 6–3, 7–6^{(7–4)}

Details
- Draw: 28 (4 Q / 3 WC )
- Seeds: 8

Events
Singles	Doubles
← 2022 ·	Open 13	· 2024 →

Hubert Hurkacz defeated Benjamin Bonzi in the final, 6–3, 7–6^{(7–4)} to win the men's singles tennis title at the 2023 Open 13. He saved a match point en route to the title, against Mikael Ymer in the quarterfinals.

Andrey Rublev was the reigning champion, but chose to compete in Doha instead.

== Seeds ==
The top four seeds received a bye into the second round.

1. (Poland) Hubert Hurkacz (champion)
2. (Italy) Jannik Sinner (second round, withdrew)
3. (Australia) Alex de Minaur (quarterfinals)
4. (Bulgaria) Grigor Dimitrov (quarterfinals)
5. (United States) Maxime Cressy (second round)
6. (Belgium) David Goffin (second round, withdrew)
7. (France) Richard Gasquet (second round)
8. (Switzerland) Marc-Andrea Hüsler (first round)

== Draw ==
=== Key ===
- Q = Qualifier
- WC = Wild card
- LL = Lucky loser
- Alt = Alternate
- SE = Special exempt
- PR = Protected ranking
- ITF = ITF entry
- JE = Junior exempt
- w/o = Walkover
- r = Retired
- d = Defaulted
- SR = Special ranking

=== Finals ===
Semifinals
1	(Poland) Hubert Hurkacz	6	7^{7}
(Kazakhstan) Alexander Bublik	4	6^{4}
(France) Benjamin Bonzi	6	6
WC	(France) Arthur Fils	4	4

Final
1	(Poland) Hubert Hurkacz	6	7^{7}
(France) Benjamin Bonzi	3	6^{4}

=== Top half ===
First round
(France) A Rinderknech	3	4
(Switzerland) L Riedi	6	6
(Sweden) M Ymer	6	7^{7}
(Moldova) R Albot	3	6^{5}
Q	(Slovakia) L Klein	2	4
6	(Belgium) D Goffin	6	6
(Sweden) E Ymer	6	5	3
Q	(Netherlands) G Brouwer	3	7	6
(Kazakhstan) A Bublik	5	6	6
(Serbia) F Krajinović	7	3	4
(France) G Barrère	6	6
8	(Switzerland) M-A Hüsler	3	2

Second round
1	(Poland) H Hurkacz	4	6	6
(Switzerland) L Riedi	6	3	2
(Sweden) M Ymer	w/o
6	(Belgium) D Goffin
4	(Bulgaria) G Dimitrov	6	6
Q	(Netherlands) G Brouwer	3	2
(Kazakhstan) A Bublik	6	6
(France) G Barrère	4	2

Quarterfinals
1	(Poland) H Hurkacz	6	3	7^{8}
(Sweden) M Ymer	3	6	6^{6}
4	(Bulgaria) G Dimitrov	5	6	6^{6}
(Kazakhstan) A Bublik	7	3	7^{8}

Semifinals
1	(Poland) H Hurkacz	6	7^{7}
(Kazakhstan) A Bublik	4	6^{4}

=== Bottom half ===
First round
5	(United States) M Cressy	6	6^{5}	7^{7}
WC	(France) G Blancaneaux	3	7^{7}	6^{4}
(France) B Bonzi	7	7
WC	(France) L Van Assche	5	5
Q	(Switzerland) A Ritschard	7	6
(Spain) P Andújar	5	3
7	(France) R Gasquet	7^{7}	2	7^{7}
Q	(France) L Lokoli	6^{5}	6	6^{5}
(Belgium) Z Bergs	4	7^{8}	4
(Switzerland) S Wawrinka	6	6^{6}	6
WC	(France) A Fils	6	6
R Safiullin	4	3

Second round
5	(United States) M Cressy	7^{7}	4	3
(France) B Bonzi	6^{5}	6	6
Q	(Switzerland) A Ritschard	3	3
3	(Australia) A de Minaur	6	6
7	(France) R Gasquet	6	5	2
(Switzerland) S Wawrinka	4	7	6
WC	(France) A Fils	w/o
2	(Italy) J Sinner

Quarterfinals
(France) B Bonzi	6	6
3	(Australia) A de Minaur	2	4
(Switzerland) S Wawrinka	2	3
WC	(France) A Fils	6	6

Semifinals
(France) B Bonzi	6	6
WC	(France) A Fils	4	4

== Qualifying ==
=== Seeds ===
1. (Italy) Raúl Brancaccio (qualifying competition)
2. (Slovakia) Lukáš Klein (qualified)
3. (Austria) Filip Misolic (qualifying competition)
4. (France) Hugo Grenier (first round)
5. (Netherlands) Gijs Brouwer (qualified)
6. (France) Manuel Guinard (first round)
7. (Hungary) Fábián Marozsán (first round)
8. (France) Laurent Lokoli (qualified)

=== Qualifiers ===
1. (Netherlands) Gijs Brouwer
2. (Slovakia) Lukáš Klein
3. (France) Laurent Lokoli
4. (Switzerland) Alexander Ritschard

=== Qualifying draw ===
==== First qualifier ====
First round
1	(Italy) Raúl Brancaccio	3	7^{9}	6
(United States) Emilio Nava	6	6^{7}	1
WC	(France) Sascha Gueymard Wayenburg	4	4
5	(Netherlands) Gijs Brouwer	6	6

Qualifying competition
1	(Italy) Raúl Brancaccio	1	4
5	(Netherlands) Gijs Brouwer	6	6

==== Second qualifier ====
First round
2	(Slovakia) Lukáš Klein	4	7	7^{7}
WC	(France) Clément Chidekh	6	5	6^{1}
(Hungary) Zsombor Piros	6	7
6	(France) Manuel Guinard	4	5

Qualifying competition
2	(Slovakia) Lukáš Klein	7	6
(Hungary) Zsombor Piros	5	1

==== Third qualifier ====
First round
3	(Austria) Filip Misolic	6	6
Alt	(Belgium) Kimmer Coppejans	1	2
PR	Egor Gerasimov	6^{5}	1
8	(France) Laurent Lokoli	7^{7}	6

Qualifying competition
3	(Austria) Filip Misolic	4	3
8	(France) Laurent Lokoli	6	6

==== Fourth qualifier ====
First round
4	(France) Hugo Grenier	3	4
(Switzerland) Antoine Bellier	6	6
(Switzerland) Alexander Ritschard	2	6	6
7	(Hungary) Fábián Marozsán	6	3	4

Qualifying competition
(Switzerland) Antoine Bellier	3	6^{1}
(Switzerland) Alexander Ritschard	6	7^{7}
