= 2023 Open 13 Provence =

Men's tennis tournament in Marseille, France

Coordinates: 43.2710°N 5.4010°E

- Date: 20–26 February
- Edition: 31st
- Category: ATP 250 Series
- Draw: 28S / 16D
- Prize money: €707,510
- Surface: Hard (indoor)
- Location: Marseille, France
- Venue: Palais des Sports de Marseille

Champions

Singles
- (Poland) Hubert Hurkacz

Doubles
- (Mexico) Santiago González / (France) Édouard Roger-Vasselin
- Open 13 Provence

The 2023 Open 13 Provence was a men's tennis tournament played on indoor hard courts. It was the 31st edition of the Open 13, and part of the ATP Tour 250 series of the 2023 ATP Tour. It took place at the Palais des Sports de Marseille in Marseille, France, from 20 January through 26 February 2023. First-seeded Hubert Hurkacz won the singles title.

== Finals ==
=== Singles ===
- (Poland) Hubert Hurkacz defeated (France) Benjamin Bonzi, 6–3, 7–6^{(7–4)}

=== Doubles ===
- (Mexico) Santiago González / (France) Édouard Roger-Vasselin defeated (France) Nicolas Mahut / (France) Fabrice Martin, 4–6, 7–6^{(7–4)}, [10–7]

== Points and prize money ==
=== Point distribution ===
Event	W	F	SF	QF	Round of 16	Round of 32	Q	Q2	Q1
Singles	250	150	90	45	20	0	12	6	0
Doubles	250	150	90	45	0	—N/a	—N/a	—N/a	—N/a

=== Prize money ===
Event	W	F	SF	QF	Round of 16	Round of 32	Q2	Q1
Singles	€107,610	€62,770	€36,905	€21,385	€12,420	€7,585	€3,795	€2,070
Doubles*	€37,390	€20,000	€11,730	€6,560	€3,860	—N/a	—N/a	—N/a
Doubles prize money per team

== Singles main-draw entrants ==
=== Seeds ===
Country	Player	Rank^{1}	Seed
POL	Hubert Hurkacz	10	1
~~ITA~~	~~Jannik Sinner~~	~~14~~	~~2~~
AUS	Alex de Minaur	25	3
BUL	Grigor Dimitrov	28	4
USA	Maxime Cressy	40	5
BEL	David Goffin	41	6
FRA	Richard Gasquet	45	7
SUI	Marc-Andrea Hüsler	47	8

- Rankings are as of 13 February 2023.

=== Other entrants ===
The following players received wildcards into the main draw:

- (France) Geoffrey Blancaneaux
- (France) Arthur Fils
- (France) Luca Van Assche

The following players received entry from the qualifying draw:

- (Netherlands) Gijs Brouwer
- (Slovakia) Lukáš Klein
- (France) Laurent Lokoli
- (Switzerland) Alexander Ritschard

=== Withdrawals ===
- (Spain) Pablo Carreño Busta → replaced by (Spain) Pablo Andújar
- Karen Khachanov → replaced by (Moldova) Radu Albot
- (France) Gaël Monfils → replaced by Roman Safiullin
- (Germany) Oscar Otte → replaced by (Sweden) Elias Ymer
- (Denmark) Holger Rune → replaced by (Switzerland) Leandro Riedi
- (Italy) Jannik Sinner

== Doubles main-draw entrants ==
=== Seeds ===
Country	Player	Country	Player	Rank^{1}	Seed
MEX	Santiago González	FRA	Édouard Roger-Vasselin	58	1
FRA	Nicolas Mahut	FRA	Fabrice Martin	108	2
BEL	Sander Gillé	BEL	Joran Vliegen	111	3
~~GBR~~	~~Julian Cash~~	~~GBR~~	~~Henry Patten~~	~~129~~	~~4~~
NED	Sander Arends	NED	David Pel	162	5

- ^{1} Rankings are as of 13 February 2023.

=== Other entrants ===
The following pairs received wildcards into the doubles main draw:

- (France) Arthur Fils / (France) Luca Van Assche
- (France) Luca Sanchez / (Greece) Petros Tsitsipas

The following pair received entry as alternates:

- (Monaco) Romain Arneodo / (Austria) Sam Weissborn

=== Withdrawals ===
- (United Kingdom) Julian Cash / (United Kingdom) Henry Patten → replaced by (Monaco) Romain Arneodo / (Austria) Sam Weissborn
- (France) Jérémy Chardy / (France) Fabrice Martin → replaced by (France) Nicolas Mahut / (France) Fabrice Martin
- (Ecuador) Diego Hidalgo / (United States) Hunter Reese → replaced by (Italy) Marco Bortolotti / (Spain) Sergio Martos Gornés
- (France) Ugo Humbert / (France) Nicolas Mahut → replaced by (Australia) Andrew Harris / (Australia) John-Patrick Smith
