= 2022 Open 13 Provence – Doubles =

Doubles
- 2022 Open 13 Provence

Final
- Champions: (Ukraine) Denys Molchanov (Russia) Andrey Rublev
- Runners-up: (South Africa) Raven Klaasen (Japan) Ben McLachlan
- Score: 4–6, 7–5, [10–7]

Events
Singles	Doubles
← 2021 ·	Open 13	· 2023 →

Denys Molchanov and Andrey Rublev defeated Raven Klaasen and Ben McLachlan in the final, 4–6, 7–5, [10–7] to win the doubles tennis title at the 2022 Open 13 Provence. Rublev completed a double crown, having won the singles title earlier in the day.

Lloyd Glasspool and Harri Heliövaara were the defending champions but chose to play in Delray Beach instead.

== Seeds ==
1. (France) Pierre-Hugues Herbert / (France) Nicolas Mahut (first round)
2. (South Africa) Raven Klaasen / (Japan) Ben McLachlan (final)
3. (Netherlands) Matwé Middelkoop / (Germany) Andreas Mies (semifinals)
4. (United Kingdom) Jonny O'Mara / (Spain) David Vega Hernández (first round)

== Draw ==
=== Key ===
- Q = Qualifier
- WC = Wild card
- LL = Lucky loser
- Alt = Alternate
- SE = Special exempt
- PR = Protected ranking
- ITF = ITF entry
- JE = Junior exempt
- w/o = Walkover
- r = Retired
- d = Defaulted
- SR = Special ranking

=== Draw ===
First round
1	(France) P-H Herbert (France) N Mahut	4	4
(France) H Gaston (Denmark) H Rune	6	6
(Monaco) R Arneodo (Belarus) A Vasilevski	2	2
(Poland) S Walków (Poland) J Zieliński	6	6
4	(United Kingdom) J O'Mara (Spain) D Vega Hernández	6	6^{4}	[6]
(Ukraine) D Molchanov (Russia) A Rublev	3	7^{7}	[10]
(France) B Bonzi (France) A Olivetti	7^{7}	7
(Australia) A Popyrin (Australia) M Reid	6^{5}	5
WC	(France) L Pouille (France) G Simon	7^{7}	0	[7]
WC	(France) U Blanchet (France) T Legout	6^{3}	6	[10]
Alt	(United States) H Reese (Netherlands) S Verbeek	1	7^{7}	[8]
3	(Netherlands) M Middelkoop (Germany) A Mies	6	6^{1}	[10]
(Poland) K Majchrzak (Italy) S Travaglia	7	6^{3}	[11]
(France) É Roger-Vasselin (New Zealand) A Sitak	5	7^{7}	[13]
(France) S Doumbia (France) F Reboul	5	7	[3]
2	(South Africa) R Klaasen (Japan) B McLachlan	7	5	[10]

Quarterfinals
(France) H Gaston (Denmark) H Rune	7^{7}	5	[10]
(Poland) S Walków (Poland) J Zieliński	6^{2}	7	[6]
(Ukraine) D Molchanov (Russia) A Rublev	6	5	[10]
(France) B Bonzi (France) A Olivetti	4	7	[8]
WC	(France) U Blanchet (France) T Legout	6	4	[5]
3	(Netherlands) M Middelkoop (Germany) A Mies	2	6	[10]
(France) É Roger-Vasselin (New Zealand) A Sitak	6^{3}	5
2	(South Africa) R Klaasen (Japan) B McLachlan	7^{7}	7

Semifinals
(France) H Gaston (Denmark) H Rune	5	7^{7}	[5]
(Ukraine) D Molchanov (Russia) A Rublev	7	6^{4}	[10]
3	(Netherlands) M Middelkoop (Germany) A Mies	7	3	[4]
2	(South Africa) R Klaasen (Japan) B McLachlan	5	6	[10]

Final
(Ukraine) D Molchanov (Russia) A Rublev	4	7	[10]
2	(South Africa) R Klaasen (Japan) B McLachlan	6	5	[7]
