= 2022 Open 13 Provence =

Men's tennis tournament in Marseille, France

Coordinates: 43.2710°N 5.4010°E

- Date: 14–20 February
- Edition: 30th
- Category: ATP 250 Series
- Draw: 28S / 16D
- Surface: Hard (indoor)
- Location: Marseille, France
- Venue: Palais des Sports de Marseille

Champions

Singles
- (Russia) Andrey Rublev

Doubles
- (Ukraine) Denys Molchanov / (Russia) Andrey Rublev
- Open 13 Provence

The 2022 Open 13 Provence was a men's tennis tournament played on indoor hard courts. It was the 30th edition of the Open 13, and part of the ATP Tour 250 series of the 2022 ATP Tour. It took place at the Palais des Sports de Marseille in Marseille, France, from 14 through 20 February 2022.

== Finals ==
=== Singles ===
- (Russia) Andrey Rublev defeated (Canada) Félix Auger-Aliassime, 7–5, 7–6^{(7–4)}

=== Doubles ===
- (Ukraine) Denys Molchanov / (Russia) Andrey Rublev defeated (South Africa) Raven Klaasen / (Japan) Ben McLachlan, 4–6, 7–5, [10–7]

== Points and prize money ==
=== Point distribution ===
Event	W	F	SF	QF	Round of 16	Round of 32	Q	Q2	Q1
Singles	250	150	90	45	20	0	12	6	0
Doubles	250	150	90	45	0	—N/a	—N/a	—N/a	—N/a

=== Prize money ===
Event	W	F	SF	QF	Round of 16	Round of 32	Q2	Q1
Singles	€58,470	€40,930	€27,110	€18,070	€11,695	€6,380	€3,190	€1,595
Doubles*	€20,730	€15,880	€9,570	€6,380	€3,720	—N/a	—N/a	—N/a

_{*per team}

== Singles main-draw entrants ==
=== Seeds ===
Country	Player	Rank^{1}	Seed
GRE	Stefanos Tsitsipas	4	1
RUS	Andrey Rublev	7	2
CAN	Félix Auger-Aliassime	9	3
RUS	Aslan Karatsev	14	4
BLR	Ilya Ivashka	48	5
NED	Tallon Griekspoor	62	6
AUS	Alexei Popyrin	66	7
~~ITA~~	~~Gianluca Mager~~	~~67~~	~~8~~
FRA	Benjamin Bonzi	68	9

- Rankings are as of February 7, 2022.

=== Other entrants ===
The following players received wildcards into the main draw:

- (France) Jo-Wilfried Tsonga
- (France) Lucas Pouille
- (France) Gilles Simon

The following players received entry from the qualifying draw:

- (Bosnia and Herzegovina) Damir Džumhur
- (Kazakhstan) Mikhail Kukushkin
- (Czech Republic) Tomáš Macháč
- (Russia) Roman Safiullin

The following player received entry as a lucky loser:

- (Belgium) Zizou Bergs

=== Withdrawals ===
Before the tournament

- (Lithuania) Ričardas Berankis → replaced by (France) Pierre-Hugues Herbert
- (France) Ugo Humbert → replaced by (Austria) Dennis Novak
- (Italy) Gianluca Mager → replaced by (Belgium) Zizou Bergs
- (Italy) Jannik Sinner → replaced by (Poland) Kamil Majchrzak

== Doubles main-draw entrants ==
=== Seeds ===
Country	Player	Country	Player	Rank^{1}	Seed
FRA	Pierre-Hugues Herbert	FRA	Nicolas Mahut	13	1
RSA	Raven Klaasen	JPN	Ben McLachlan	66	2
NED	Matwé Middelkoop	GER	Andreas Mies	69	3
GBR	Jonny O'Mara	ESP	David Vega Hernández	160	4

- ^{1} Rankings are as of February 7, 2022.

=== Other entrants ===
The following pairs received wildcards into the doubles main draw:

- (France) Ugo Blanchet / (France) Timo Legout
- (France) Lucas Pouille / (France) Gilles Simon

The following pair received entry as alternates:

- (United States) Hunter Reese / (Netherlands) Sem Verbeek

=== Withdrawals ===
Before the tournament

- (Netherlands) Sander Arends / (Netherlands) David Pel → replaced by (United States) Hunter Reese / (Netherlands) Sem Verbeek
- (France) Hugo Gaston / (France) Ugo Humbert → replaced by (France) Hugo Gaston / (Denmark) Holger Rune
