= 2025 Open 13 Provence =

Men's tennis tournament in Marseille, France

- Date: 10–16 February
- Edition: 33rd
- Category: ATP 250 Series
- Draw: 28S / 16D
- Surface: Hard (indoor)
- Location: Marseille, France
- Venue: Palais des Sports de Marseille

Champions

Singles
- (France) Ugo Humbert

Doubles
- (France) Benjamin Bonzi / (France) Pierre-Hugues Herbert
- Open 13 Provence

The 2025 Open 13 Provence was a men's tennis tournament played on indoor hard courts. It was the 33rd edition of the Open 13, and part of the ATP Tour 250 series of the 2025 ATP Tour. It took place at the Palais des Sports de Marseille in Marseille, France, from 10 through 16 February 2025.

== Champions ==
=== Singles ===
- (France) Ugo Humbert def. (Serbia) Hamad Medjedovic, 7–6^{(7–4)}, 6–4

=== Doubles ===
- (France) Benjamin Bonzi / (France) Pierre-Hugues Herbert def. (Belgium) Sander Gillé / (Poland) Jan Zieliński, 6–3, 6–4

== Singles main-draw entrants ==
=== Seeds ===
Country	Player	Rank^{1}	Seed
	Daniil Medvedev	7	1
FRA	Ugo Humbert	15	2
	Karen Khachanov	20	3
POL	Hubert Hurkacz	21	4
USA	Sebastian Korda	22	5
~~FRA~~	~~Giovanni Mpetshi Perricard~~	~~30~~	~~6~~
ITA	Lorenzo Sonego	34	7
POR	Nuno Borges	37	8

- Rankings are as of 3 February 2025.

=== Other entrants ===
The following players received wildcards into the main draw:

- (France) Richard Gasquet
- Daniil Medvedev
- (Switzerland) Stan Wawrinka

The following player received entry as an alternate:

- (Belgium) Raphaël Collignon

The following players received entry from the qualifying draw:

- (France) Clément Chidekh
- (France) Arthur Géa
- (France) Hugo Grenier
- (France) Pierre-Hugues Herbert

The following players received entry as lucky losers:

- (France) Manuel Guinard
- (France) Luca Van Assche

=== Withdrawals ===
- (France) Arthur Fils → replaced by (Germany) Daniel Altmaier
- (China) Shang Juncheng → replaced by (Finland) Otto Virtanen
- (France) Gaël Monfils → replaced by (France) Manuel Guinard
- (France) Giovanni Mpetshi Perricard → replaced by (France) Luca Van Assche
- (Australia) Jordan Thompson → replaced by (Netherlands) Botic van de Zandschulp

== Doubles main-draw entrants ==
=== Seeds ===
Country	Player	Country	Player	Rank^{1}	Seed
MON	Hugo Nys	FRA	Édouard Roger-Vasselin	56	1
BEL	Sander Gillé	POL	Jan Zieliński	63	2
SWE	André Göransson	NED	Sem Verbeek	87	3
NED	Sander Arends	GBR	Luke Johnson	103	4

- ^{1} Rankings are as of 3 February 2025.

=== Other entrants ===
The following pairs received wildcards into the doubles main draw:

- (France) Benjamin Bonzi / (France) Pierre-Hugues Herbert
- ~~(France) Jonathan Eysseric / (France) Lucas Pouille~~

The following pair received entry as alternates:

- (Poland) Kamil Majchrzak / (Poland) Szymon Walków

=== Withdrawals ===
- (Monaco) Romain Arneodo / (Netherlands) Matwé Middelkoop → replaced by (India) Yuki Bhambri / (Netherlands) Matwé Middelkoop
- (India) Yuki Bhambri / (Croatia) Ivan Dodig → replaced by (Netherlands) David Pel / (United States) Patrik Trhac
- (United Kingdom) Julian Cash / (United Kingdom) Lloyd Glasspool → replaced by (Poland) Karol Drzewiecki / (Poland) Piotr Matuszewski
- (Australia) Matthew Ebden / (Belgium) Joran Vliegen → replaced by (France) Manuel Guinard / (Belgium) Joran Vliegen
- (France) Jonathan Eysseric / (France) Lucas Pouille → replaced by (Poland) Kamil Majchrzak / (Poland) Szymon Walków
- (United Kingdom) Jacob Fearnley / (United States) Reese Stalder → replaced by (United States) Reese Stalder / (United Kingdom) Marcus Willis
- (Ukraine) Denys Molchanov / (Kazakhstan) Aleksandr Nedovyesov → replaced by (France) Quentin Halys / (Ukraine) Denys Molchanov
