= 2024 Open 13 Provence – Singles =

Singles
- 2024 Open 13 Provence

Final
- Champion: (France) Ugo Humbert
- Runner-up: (Bulgaria) Grigor Dimitrov
- Score: 6–4, 6–3

Details
- Draw: 28 (4 Q / 3 WC )
- Seeds: 8

Events
Singles	Doubles
← 2023 ·	Open 13	· 2025 →

Ugo Humbert defeated Grigor Dimitrov in the final, 6–4, 6–3 to win the singles tennis title at the 2024 Open 13 Provence. It was his fifth ATP Tour singles title.

Hubert Hurkacz was the defending champion, but lost in the semifinals to Humbert.

== Seeds ==
The top four seeds received a bye into the second round.

1. (Poland) Hubert Hurkacz (semifinals)
2. (Bulgaria) Grigor Dimitrov (final)
3. Karen Khachanov (semifinals)
4. (France) Ugo Humbert (champion)
5. (Spain) Alejandro Davidovich Fokina (quarterfinals)
6. (Italy) Lorenzo Musetti (second round)
7. (Canada) Félix Auger-Aliassime (second round)
8. (Czech Republic) Jiří Lehečka (second round)

== Draw ==
=== Key ===
- Q = Qualifier
- WC = Wild card
- LL = Lucky loser
- Alt = Alternate
- ITF = ITF entry
- PR = Protected ranking
- SR = Special ranking
- SE = Special exempt
- JE = Junior exempt
- JR = Junior Accelerator Programme entrant
- CO = College Accelerator Programme entrant
- NG = Next Gen Accelerator Program entrant
- w/o = Walkover
- r = Retired
- d = Defaulted

=== Finals ===
Semifinals
1	(Poland) Hubert Hurkacz	4	4
4	(France) Ugo Humbert	6	6
3	Karen Khachanov	7^{7}	4	6^{5}
2	(Bulgaria) Grigor Dimitrov	6^{3}	6	7^{7}

Final
4	(France) Ugo Humbert	6	6
2	(Bulgaria) Grigor Dimitrov	4	3

=== Top half ===
First round
WC	(France) B Bonzi	6^{4}	4
(Kazakhstan) A Shevchenko	7^{7}	6
(Czech Republic) T Macháč	7	6
(United Kingdom) A Murray	5	4
Alt	(Germany) M Marterer	4	2
6	(Italy) L Musetti	6	6
Q	(France) H Gaston	7	1	6
WC	(Canada) D Shapovalov	5	6	3
(Finland) E Ruusuvuori	7^{7}	6
(France) L Van Assche	6^{2}	4
(France) G Barrère	6	4	4
5	(Spain) A Davidovich Fokina	4	6	6

Second round
1	(Poland) H Hurkacz	6	6
(Kazakhstan) A Shevchenko	1	4
(Czech Republic) T Macháč	6	6
6	(Italy) L Musetti	3	2
4	(France) U Humbert	2	6	6
Q	(France) H Gaston	6	1	3
(Finland) E Ruusuvuori	3	5
5	(Spain) A Davidovich Fokina	6	7

Quarterfinals
1	(Poland) H Hurkacz	6	6
(Czech Republic) T Macháč	3	4
4	(France) U Humbert	6	6
5	(Spain) A Davidovich Fokina	1	4

Semifinals
1	(Poland) H Hurkacz	4	4
4	(France) U Humbert	6	6

=== Bottom half ===
First round
7	(Canada) F Auger-Aliassime	6	7
WC	(France) Q Halys	2	5
(China) Z Zhang	6^{7}	6	6
LL	(Italy) G Zeppieri	7^{9}	1	4
(Spain) R Bautista Agut	6	7
(France) R Gasquet	3	5
8	(Czech Republic) J Lehečka	3	7	6
Q	(Belgium) D Goffin	6	5	2
Q	(United States) M Cressy	7^{8}	5	2
Alt	(France) A Rinderknech	6^{6}	7	6
(United States) S Korda	6	2	7^{7}
Q	(France) H Grenier	3	6	6^{3}

Second round
7	(Canada) F Auger-Aliassime	4	4
(China) Z Zhang	6	6
(Spain) R Bautista Agut	2	2
3	K Khachanov	6	6
8	(Czech Republic) J Lehečka	5	6^{5}
Alt	(France) A Rinderknech	7	7^{7}
(United States) S Korda	1	6^{5}
2	(Bulgaria) G Dimitrov	6	7^{7}

Quarterfinals
(China) Z Zhang	4	1
3	K Khachanov	6	6
Alt	(France) A Rinderknech	3	6^{3}
2	(Bulgaria) G Dimitrov	6	7^{7}

Semifinals
3	K Khachanov	7^{7}	4	6^{5}
2	(Bulgaria) G Dimitrov	6^{3}	6	7^{7}

== Qualifying ==
=== Seeds ===
1. (France) Hugo Gaston (qualified)
2. (Italy) Giulio Zeppieri (qualifying competition, lucky loser)
3. (United States) Maxime Cressy (qualified)
4. (Belgium) David Goffin (qualified)
5. (France) Harold Mayot (first round, retired)
6. (France) Hugo Grenier (qualified)
7. (Italy) Matteo Gigante (first round)
8. (Spain) Pablo Llamas Ruiz (first round)

=== Qualifiers ===
1. (France) Hugo Gaston
2. (France) Hugo Grenier
3. (United States) Maxime Cressy
4. (Belgium) David Goffin

=== Lucky loser ===
1. (Italy) Giulio Zeppieri

=== Qualifying draw ===
==== First qualifier ====
First round
1	(France) Hugo Gaston	7	6
(France) Titouan Droguet	5	4
Alt	(France) Pierre-Hugues Herbert	7^{7}	6
7	(Italy) Matteo Gigante	6^{5}	4

Qualifying competition
1	(France) Hugo Gaston	3	6	6
Alt	(France) Pierre-Hugues Herbert	6	2	3

==== Second qualifier ====
First round
2	(Italy) Giulio Zeppieri	7	6
Alt	(Spain) Nikolás Sánchez Izquierdo	5	2
(France) Calvin Hemery	4	4
6	(France) Hugo Grenier	6	6

Qualifying competition
2	(Italy) Giulio Zeppieri	6	5	3
6	(France) Hugo Grenier	3	7	6

==== Third qualifier ====
First round
3	(United States) Maxime Cressy	6	6
Alt	(Spain) David Jordà Sanchis	4	4
Alt	(United States) Martin Damm	6	7^{7}
8	(Spain) Pablo Llamas Ruiz	3	6^{4}

Qualifying competition
3	(United States) Maxime Cressy	6	6
Alt	(United States) Martin Damm	4	4

==== Fourth qualifier ====
First round
4	(Belgium) David Goffin	6	4	7^{7}
Alt	(Spain) Alejandro Moro Cañas	1	6	6^{2}
WC	(France) Lucas Pouille	7	3
5	(France) Harold Mayot	5	3^{r}

Qualifying competition
4	(Belgium) David Goffin	7	6
WC	(France) Lucas Pouille	5	3
