= 2022 Open 13 Provence – Singles =

Singles
- 2022 Open 13 Provence

Final
- Champion: (Russia) Andrey Rublev
- Runner-up: (Canada) Félix Auger-Aliassime
- Score: 7–5, 7–6^{(7–4)}

Details
- Draw: 28 (4 Q / 3 WC )
- Seeds: 8

Events
Singles	Doubles
← 2021 ·	Open 13	· 2023 →

Andrey Rublev defeated Félix Auger-Aliassime in the final, 7–5, 7–6^{(7–4)} to win the singles title at the 2022 Open 13 Provence.

Daniil Medvedev was the defending champion, but chose not to defend his title.

== Seeds ==
The top four seeds received a bye into the second round.

1. (Greece) Stefanos Tsitsipas (quarterfinals)
2. (Russia) Andrey Rublev (champion)
3. (Canada) Félix Auger-Aliassime (final)
4. (Russia) Aslan Karatsev (quarterfinals)
5. (Belarus) Ilya Ivashka (quarterfinals)
6. (Netherlands) Tallon Griekspoor (first round)
7. (Australia) Alexei Popyrin (first round)
8. (Italy) Gianluca Mager (withdrew)
9. (France) Benjamin Bonzi (semifinals)

== Draw ==
=== Key ===
- Q = Qualifier
- WC = Wild card
- LL = Lucky loser
- Alt = Alternate
- SE = Special exempt
- PR = Protected ranking
- ITF = ITF entry
- JE = Junior exempt
- w/o = Walkover
- r = Retired
- d = Defaulted
- SR = Special ranking

=== Finals ===
Semifinals
Q	(Russia) Roman Safiullin	6^{4}	6^{5}
3	(Canada) Félix Auger-Aliassime	7^{7}	7^{7}
9	(France) Benjamin Bonzi	3	6	3
2	(Russia) Andrey Rublev	6	4	6

Final
3	(Canada) Félix Auger-Aliassime	5	6^{4}
2	(Russia) Andrey Rublev	7	7^{7}

=== Top half ===
First round
(France) H Gaston	6	6
(France) C Moutet	4	4
Q	(Bosnia and Herzegovina) D Džumhur	6	3	1
Q	(Czech Republic) T Macháč	1	6	6
Q	(Russia) R Safiullin	6^{5}	6	7^{7}
7	(Australia) A Popyrin	7^{7}	4	6^{3}
WC	(France) J-W Tsonga	6	6
WC	(France) G Simon	2	4
(Italy) S Travaglia	6	6^{5}	7^{7}
(Switzerland) H Laaksonen	2	7^{7}	6^{1}
(Slovakia) N Gombos	6^{5}	3
5	(Belarus) I Ivashka	7^{7}	6

Second round
1	(Greece) S Tsitsipas	6	7^{7}
(France) H Gaston	3	6^{4}
Q	(Czech Republic) T Macháč	7^{8}	4	6^{4}
Q	(Russia) R Safiullin	6^{6}	6	7^{7}
3	(Canada) F Auger-Aliassime	7^{7}	6
WC	(France) J-W Tsonga	6^{3}	2
(Italy) S Travaglia	1	3
5	(Belarus) I Ivashka	6	6

Quarterfinals
1	(Greece) S Tsitsipas	4	4
Q	(Russia) R Safiullin	6	6
3	(Canada) F Auger-Aliassime	6	6
5	(Belarus) I Ivashka	3	4

Semifinals
Q	(Russia) R Safiullin	6^{4}	6^{5}
3	(Canada) F Auger-Aliassime	7^{7}	7^{7}

=== Bottom half ===
First round
9	(France) B Bonzi	7^{7}	6
(Poland) K Majchrzak	6^{1}	4
Q	(Kazakhstan) M Kukushkin	6^{5}	5
(France) P-H Herbert	7^{7}	7
LL	(Belgium) Z Bergs	6	3	4
(Denmark) H Rune	1	6	6
6	(Netherlands) T Griekspoor	5	6	1
WC	(France) L Pouille	7	3	6
(Moldova) R Albot	3	7	6
(Austria) D Novak	6	5	1
(France) R Gasquet	6	7
(Sweden) M Ymer	4	5

Second round
9	(France) B Bonzi	6	6
(France) P-H Herbert	4	3
(Denmark) H Rune	3	6^{1}
4	(Russia) A Karatsev	6	7^{7}
WC	(France) L Pouille	6	3	7^{7}
(Moldova) R Albot	3	6	6^{2}
(France) R Gasquet	6	3	6^{3}
2	(Russia) A Rublev	4	6	7^{7}

Quarterfinals
9	(France) B Bonzi	6	6
4	(Russia) A Karatsev	1	3
WC	(France) L Pouille	3	6	2
2	(Russia) A Rublev	6	1	6

Semifinals
9	(France) B Bonzi	3	6	3
2	(Russia) A Rublev	6	4	6

== Qualifying ==
=== Seeds ===
1. (Czech Republic) Tomáš Macháč (qualified)
2. (Bosnia and Herzegovina) Damir Džumhur (qualified)
3. (Russia) Roman Safiullin (qualified)
4. (Kazakhstan) Mikhail Kukushkin (qualified)
5. (Belgium) Zizou Bergs (qualifying competition, lucky loser)
6. (Italy) Flavio Cobolli (first round)
7. (Switzerland) Marc-Andrea Hüsler (qualifying competition)
8. (Slovakia) Lukáš Lacko (first round)

=== Qualifiers ===
1. (Czech Republic) Tomáš Macháč
2. (Bosnia and Herzegovina) Damir Džumhur
3. (Russia) Roman Safiullin
4. (Kazakhstan) Mikhail Kukushkin

=== Lucky loser ===
1. (Belgium) Zizou Bergs

=== Qualifying draw ===
==== First qualifier ====
First round
1	(Czech Republic) Tomáš Macháč	6	6
(Slovakia) Filip Horanský	1	4
Alt	(Italy) Andrea Arnaboldi	7^{7}	6
8	(Slovakia) Lukáš Lacko	6^{4}	4

Qualifying competition
1	(Czech Republic) Tomáš Macháč	7	6
Alt	(Italy) Andrea Arnaboldi	5	3

==== Second qualifier ====
First round
2	(Bosnia and Herzegovina) Damir Džumhur	6	3	6
Alt	(France) Matteo Martineau	2	6	3
Alt	(Russia) Ivan Gakhov	4	2
5	(Belgium) Zizou Bergs	6	6

Qualifying competition
2	(Bosnia and Herzegovina) Damir Džumhur	6	6
5	(Belgium) Zizou Bergs	3	2

==== Third qualifier ====
First round
3	(Russia) Roman Safiullin	6	6
(Latvia) Ernests Gulbis	3	4
Alt	(Germany) Julian Lenz	7	6
6/Alt	(Italy) Flavio Cobolli	5	2

Qualifying competition
3	(Russia) Roman Safiullin	6	6
Alt	(Germany) Julian Lenz	4	3

==== Fourth qualifier ====
First round
4	(Kazakhstan) Mikhail Kukushkin	6	6
WC	(France) Timo Legout	4	1
WC	(France) Ugo Blanchet	1	7^{9}	2
7	(Switzerland) Marc-Andrea Hüsler	6	6^{7}	6

Qualifying competition
4	(Kazakhstan) Mikhail Kukushkin	6	6
7	(Switzerland) Marc-Andrea Hüsler	4	4
