= 2025 Open 13 Provence – Singles =

Singles
- 2025 Open 13 Provence

Final
- Champion: (France) Ugo Humbert
- Runner-up: (Serbia) Hamad Medjedovic
- Score: 7–6^{(7–4)}, 6–4

Details
- Draw: 28 (4 Q / 3 WC )
- Seeds: 8

Events
Singles	Doubles
← 2024 ·	Open 13 Provence	· 2026 →

Defending champion Ugo Humbert defeated Hamad Medjedovic in the final, 7–6^{(7–4)}, 6–4 to win the singles tennis title at the 2025 Open 13 Provence. It was his seventh ATP Tour singles title. Humbert was the fourth player to defend the title since the tournament's inception in 1993, after Marc Rosset, Thomas Enqvist and Stefanos Tsitsipas.

== Seeds ==
The top four seeds received a bye into the second round.

1. Daniil Medvedev (semifinals)
2. (France) Ugo Humbert (champion)
3. Karen Khachanov (second round)
4. (Poland) Hubert Hurkacz (second round)
5. (United States) Sebastian Korda (first round)
6. (France) Giovanni Mpetshi Perricard (withdrew)
7. (Italy) Lorenzo Sonego (quarterfinals)
8. (Portugal) Nuno Borges (second round)

== Draw ==
=== Key ===
- Q = Qualifier
- WC = Wild card
- LL = Lucky loser
- Alt = Alternate
- SE = Special exempt
- PR = Protected ranking
- ITF = ITF entry
- JE = Junior exempt
- w/o = Walkover
- r = Retired
- d = Defaulted
- SR = Special ranking

=== Finals ===
Semifinals
1/WC	Daniil Medvedev	3	2
(Serbia) Hamad Medjedovic	6	6
(Belgium) Zizou Bergs	4	4
2	(France) Ugo Humbert	6	6

Final
(Serbia) Hamad Medjedovic	6^{4}	4
2	(France) Ugo Humbert	7^{7}	6

=== Top half ===
First round
Q	(France) P-H Herbert	2	7	6
(France) H Mayot	6	5	3
(Germany) J-L Struff	7	7^{7}
LL	(France) M Guinard	5	6^{4}
Q	(France) H Grenier	7	6
Q	(France) A Géa	5	4
Alt	(Belgium) R Collignon	3	4
(Serbia) H Medjedovic	6	6
(Italy) L Nardi	2	2
(Germany) D Altmaier	6	6
(Finland) O Virtanen	6^{3}	7^{7}	6
5	(United States) S Korda	7^{7}	6^{4}	4

Second round
1/WC	D Medvedev	6	6
Q	(France) P-H Herbert	2	4
(Germany) J-L Struff	6	5	6
Q	(France) H Grenier	4	7	4
3	K Khachanov	2	3
(Serbia) H Medjedovic	6	6
(Germany) D Altmaier	6	6
(Finland) O Virtanen	4	3

Quarterfinals
1/WC	D Medvedev	6	6
(Germany) J-L Struff	3	2
(Serbia) H Medjedovic	7	6^{7}	6
(Germany) D Altmaier	5	7^{9}	4

Semifinals
1/WC	D Medvedev	3	2
(Serbia) H Medjedovic	6	6

=== Bottom half ===
First round
8	(Portugal) N Borges	6^{4}	7^{7}	6
WC	(Switzerland) S Wawrinka	7^{7}	6^{1}	3
Q	(France) C Chidekh	4	4
(Belgium) Z Bergs	6	6
(China) Z Zhang	6	6^{2}	7^{7}
(France) Q Halys	3	7^{7}	6^{3}
7	(Italy) L Sonego	6	3	6
(Netherlands) B van de Zandschulp	1	6	3
LL	(France) L Van Assche	3	6	7^{9}
(France) B Bonzi	6	3	6^{7}
(Kazakhstan) A Bublik	6	6
WC	(France) R Gasquet	4	4

Second round
8	(Portugal) N Borges	2	7^{7}	2
(Belgium) Z Bergs	6	6^{5}	6
(China) Z Zhang	6	6^{1}	6
4	(Poland) H Hurkacz	4	7^{7}	3
7	(Italy) L Sonego	w/o
LL	(France) L Van Assche
(Kazakhstan) A Bublik	6^{7}	4
2	(France) U Humbert	7^{9}	6

Quarterfinals
(Belgium) Z Bergs	7	0
(China) Z Zhang	5	0^{r}
7	(Italy) L Sonego	4	4
2	(France) U Humbert	6	6

Semifinals
(Belgium) Z Bergs	4	4
2	(France) U Humbert	6	6

== Qualifying ==
=== Seeds ===
1. (Poland) Kamil Majchrzak (first round)
2. (Slovakia) Jozef Kovalík (first round)
3. (Spain) Martín Landaluce (first round)
4. (Italy) Matteo Gigante (first round)
5. (Slovakia) Lukáš Klein (qualifying competition)
6. (France) Luca Van Assche (qualifying competition, lucky loser)
7. (Germany) Henri Squire (first round, retired)
8. (France) Pierre-Hugues Herbert (qualified)

=== Qualifiers ===
1. (France) Pierre-Hugues Herbert
2. (France) Arthur Géa
3. (France) Clément Chidekh
4. (France) Hugo Grenier

=== Lucky losers ===
1. (France) Manuel Guinard
2. (France) Luca Van Assche

=== Qualifying draw ===
==== First qualifier ====
First round
1	(Poland) Kamil Majchrzak	5	6^{7}
WC	(France) Manuel Guinard	7	7^{9}
(France) Calvin Hemery	2	3
8	(France) Pierre-Hugues Herbert	6	6

Qualifying competition
WC	(France) Manuel Guinard	6	4	3
8	(France) Pierre-Hugues Herbert	3	6	6

==== Second qualifier ====
First round
2	(Slovakia) Jozef Kovalík	5	2
PR	(Japan) Yosuke Watanuki	7	6
WC	(France) Arthur Géa	7	0
7	(Germany) Henri Squire	5	0^{r}

Qualifying competition
PR	(Japan) Yosuke Watanuki	6^{2}	4
WC	(France) Arthur Géa	7^{7}	6

==== Third qualifier ====
First round
3	(Spain) Martín Landaluce	3	3
(France) Clément Chidekh	6	6
Alt	(France) Matteo Martineau	6^{3}	4
6	(France) Luca Van Assche	7^{7}	6

Qualifying competition
(France) Clément Chidekh	6	4	7
6	(France) Luca Van Assche	4	6	5

==== Fourth qualifier ====
First round
4	(Italy) Matteo Gigante	6	3	3
(France) Hugo Grenier	3	6	6
Alibek Kachmazov	1	6^{3}
5	(Slovakia) Lukáš Klein	6	7^{7}

Qualifying competition
(France) Hugo Grenier	2	7^{10}	7
5	(Slovakia) Lukáš Klein	6	6^{8}	5
