= 2018 Open 13 Provence – Doubles =

Doubles
- 2018 Open 13 Provence

Final
- Champions: (South Africa) Raven Klaasen (New Zealand) Michael Venus
- Runners-up: (New Zealand) Marcus Daniell (United Kingdom) Dominic Inglot
- Score: 6–7^{(2–7)}, 6–3, [10–4]

Events
Singles	Doubles
← 2017 ·	Open 13	· 2019 →

Julien Benneteau and Nicolas Mahut were the defending champions, but lost in the semifinals to Raven Klaasen and Michael Venus.

Klaasen and Venus went on to win the title, defeating Marcus Daniell and Dominic Inglot in the final, 6–7^{(2–7)}, 6–3, [10–4].

== Seeds ==
1. (South Africa) Raven Klaasen / (New Zealand) Michael Venus (champions)
2. (India) Rohan Bopanna / (France) Édouard Roger-Vasselin (semifinals)
3. (France) Julien Benneteau / (France) Nicolas Mahut (semifinals)
4. (New Zealand) Marcus Daniell / (United Kingdom) Dominic Inglot (final)

== Draw ==
=== Key ===
- Q = Qualifier
- WC = Wild card
- LL = Lucky loser
- Alt = Alternate
- ITF = ITF entry
- PR = Protected ranking
- SR = Special ranking
- SE = Special exempt
- JE = Junior exempt
- JR = Junior Accelerator Programme entrant
- CO = College Accelerator Programme entrant
- NG = Next Gen Accelerator Program entrant
- w/o = Walkover
- r = Retired
- d = Defaulted

=== Draw ===
First round
1	(South Africa) R Klaasen (New Zealand) M Venus	6	6
Alt	(Italy) T Fabbiano (Italy) S Travaglia	3	3
(Romania) F Mergea (Canada) D Nestor	7^{12}	6
(Bosnia and Herzegovina) D Džumhur (Croatia) A Šančić	6^{10}	4
3	(France) J Benneteau (France) N Mahut	6^{3}	6	[10]
(Netherlands) S Arends (Netherlands) M Middelkoop	7^{7}	3	[4]
(Germany) A Begemann (Kazakhstan) M Kukushkin	7^{11}	7^{7}
WC	(France) A Hoang (France) A Müller	6^{9}	6^{4}
(Israel) J Erlich (Germany) P Petzschner	3	4
(France) J Eysseric (France) G Simon	6	6
(Germany) M Marterer (Portugal) J Sousa	6^{11}	6^{2}
4	(New Zealand) M Daniell (United Kingdom) D Inglot	7^{13}	7^{7}
(United States) J Cerretani (Canada) A Shamasdin	6	6^{2}	[10]
WC	(France) D Guez (France) Q Halys	4	7^{7}	[7]
(United Kingdom) K Skupski (Greece) S Tsitsipas	6	3	[6]
2	(India) R Bopanna (France) É Roger-Vasselin	2	6	[10]

Quarterfinals
1	(South Africa) R Klaasen (New Zealand) M Venus	6	6
(Romania) F Mergea (Canada) D Nestor	3	3
3	(France) J Benneteau (France) N Mahut	6	6
(Germany) A Begemann (Kazakhstan) M Kukushkin	2	4
(France) J Eysseric (France) G Simon	1	1
4	(New Zealand) M Daniell (United Kingdom) D Inglot	6	6
(United States) J Cerretani (Canada) A Shamasdin	6	6^{3}	[4]
2	(India) R Bopanna (France) É Roger-Vasselin	3	7^{7}	[10]

Semifinals
1	(South Africa) R Klaasen (New Zealand) M Venus	3	7^{7}	[10]
3	(France) J Benneteau (France) N Mahut	6	6^{4}	[8]
4	(New Zealand) M Daniell (United Kingdom) D Inglot	6	6
2	(India) R Bopanna (France) É Roger-Vasselin	1	4

Final
1	(South Africa) R Klaasen (New Zealand) M Venus	6^{2}	6	[10]
4	(New Zealand) M Daniell (United Kingdom) D Inglot	7^{7}	3	[4]
