= 2018 Open 13 Provence =

Coordinates: 43.2710°N 5.4010°E

- Date: 19–25 February
- Edition: 26th
- Category: ATP 250 Series
- Draw: 28S / 16D
- Prize money: €645,485
- Surface: Hard / indoors
- Location: Marseille, France
- Venue: Palais des Sports de Marseille

Champions

Singles
- (Russia) Karen Khachanov

Doubles
- (South Africa) Raven Klaasen / (New Zealand) Michael Venus
- Open 13 Provence

The 2018 Open 13 Provence was a men's tennis tournament played on indoor hard courts. It was the 25th edition of the Open 13, and part of the ATP World Tour 250 series of the 2018 ATP World Tour. It took at the Palais des Sports in Marseille, France, from 19 February through 25 February 2018. Ninth-seeded Karen Khachanov won the singles title.

== Finals ==
=== Singles ===
- (Russia) Karen Khachanov defeated (France) Lucas Pouille, 7–5, 3–6, 7–5

=== Doubles ===
- (South Africa) Raven Klaasen / (New Zealand) Michael Venus defeated (New Zealand) Marcus Daniell / (United Kingdom) Dominic Inglot, 6–7^{(2–7)}, 6–3, [10–4]

== Points and prize money ==
=== Point distribution ===
Event	W	F	SF	QF	Round of 16	Round of 32	Q	Q2	Q1
Singles	250	150	90	45	20	0	12	6	0
Doubles	250	150	90	45	0	—N/a	—N/a	—N/a	—N/a

=== Prize money ===
Event	W	F	SF	QF	Round of 16	Round of 32	Q2	Q1
Singles	€115,150	€60,645	€32,850	€18,715	€11,030	€6,535	€2,940	€1,470
Doubles	€34,980	€18,390	€9,960	€5,700	€3,340	—N/a	—N/a	—N/a
Doubles prize money per team

== Singles main-draw entrants ==
=== Seeds ===
Country	Player	Rank^{1}	Seed
~~BEL~~	~~David Goffin~~	~~7~~	~~1~~
SUI	Stan Wawrinka	13	2
FRA	Lucas Pouille	16	3
CZE	Tomáš Berdych	17	4
ESP	Roberto Bautista Agut	23	5
LUX	Gilles Müller	28	6
BIH	Damir Džumhur	29	7
SRB	Filip Krajinović	38	8
RUS	Karen Khachanov	48	9

- Rankings are as of February 12, 2018.

=== Other entrants ===
The following players received wildcards into the main draw:

- (Canada) Félix Auger-Aliassime
- (Spain) Roberto Bautista Agut
- (France) Hugo Gaston

The following player received entry as an alternate:

- (Slovenia) Blaž Kavčič

The following players received entry from the qualifying draw:

- (Belgium) Ruben Bemelmans
- (Slovakia) Norbert Gombos
- (Belarus) Ilya Ivashka
- (Italy) Stefano Travaglia

The following player received entry as a lucky loser:

- (Ukraine) Sergiy Stakhovsky

=== Withdrawals ===
Before the tournament

- (Belgium) David Goffin → replaced by (Slovenia) Blaž Kavčič
- (Germany) Florian Mayer → replaced by (Ukraine) Sergiy Stakhovsky
- (Germany) Jan-Lennard Struff → replaced by (Tunisia) Malek Jaziri
- (Japan) Yūichi Sugita → replaced by (Greece) Stefanos Tsitsipas
- (France) Jo-Wilfried Tsonga → replaced by (Serbia) Laslo Đere

=== Retirements ===
- (Bosnia and Herzegovina) Damir Džumhur
- (Switzerland) Stan Wawrinka

== Doubles main-draw entrants ==
=== Seeds ===
Country	Player	Country	Player	Rank^{1}	Seed
RSA	Raven Klaasen	NZL	Michael Venus	45	1
FRA	Édouard Roger-Vasselin	IND	Rohan Bopanna	46	2
FRA	Julien Benneteau	FRA	Nicolas Mahut	61	3
NZL	Marcus Daniell	GBR	Dominic Inglot	80	4

- ^{1} Rankings are as of February 12, 2018.

=== Other entrants ===
The following pairs received wildcards into the main draw:

- (France) David Guez / (France) Quentin Halys
- (France) Antoine Hoang / (France) Alexandre Müller

The following pair received entry as alternates:

- (Italy) Thomas Fabbiano / (Italy) Stefano Travaglia

=== Withdrawals ===
Before the tournament

- (Russia) Daniil Medvedev
