= 2017 Open 13 Provence =

Coordinates: 43.2710°N 5.4010°E

- Date: 20–26 February
- Edition: 25th
- Category: ATP 250 Series
- Draw: 28S / 16D
- Prize money: €620,660
- Surface: Hard / indoors
- Location: Marseille, France
- Venue: Palais des Sports de Marseille

Champions

Singles
- (France) Jo-Wilfried Tsonga

Doubles
- (France) Julien Benneteau / (France) Nicolas Mahut
- Open 13 Provence

The 2017 Open 13 Provence was a men's tennis tournament played on indoor hard courts. It was the 24th edition of the Open 13, and part of the ATP World Tour 250 series of the 2017 ATP World Tour. It took place at the Palais des Sports in Marseille, France, from 20 February through 26 February 2017. Second-seeded Jo-Wilfried Tsonga won the singles title.

== Finals ==
=== Singles ===
- (France) Jo-Wilfried Tsonga defeated (France) Lucas Pouille, 6–4, 6–4

=== Doubles ===
- (France) Julien Benneteau / (France) Nicolas Mahut defeated (Netherlands) Robin Haase / (United Kingdom) Dominic Inglot, 6–4, 6–7^{(9–11)}, [10–5]

== Points and prize money ==
=== Point distribution ===
Event	W	F	SF	QF	Round of 16	Round of 32	Q	Q2	Q1
Singles	250	150	90	45	20	0	12	6	0
Doubles	250	150	90	45	0	—N/a	—N/a	—N/a	—N/a

=== Prize money ===
Event	W	F	SF	QF	Round of 16	Round of 32	Q2	Q1
Singles	€110,655	€58,280	€31,570	€17,985	€10,600	€6,280	€2,825	€1,410
Doubles	€33,620	€17,760	€9,580	€5,480	€3,210	—N/a	—N/a	—N/a
Doubles prize money per team

== Singles main-draw entrants ==
=== Seeds ===
Country	Player	Rank^{1}	Seed
FRA	Gaël Monfils	10	1
FRA	Jo-Wilfried Tsonga	14	2
AUS	Nick Kyrgios	15	3
FRA	Lucas Pouille	17	4
GER	Alexander Zverev	18	5
FRA	Richard Gasquet	19	6
FRA	Gilles Simon	24	7
FRA	Benoît Paire	42	8

- Rankings are as of February 13, 2017.

=== Other entrants ===
The following players received wildcards into the main draw:

- (France) Julien Benneteau
- (Canada) Denis Shapovalov
- (Greece) Stefanos Tsitsipas

The following players received entry from the qualifying draw:

- (Russia) Evgeny Donskoy
- (Slovakia) Norbert Gombos
- (Russia) Andrey Rublev
- (Ukraine) Sergiy Stakhovsky

=== Withdrawals ===
Before the tournament

- (Bulgaria) Grigor Dimitrov →replaced by (France) Jérémy Chardy
- (Germany) Mischa Zverev →replaced by (France) Paul-Henri Mathieu

== Doubles main-draw entrants ==
=== Seeds ===
Country	Player	Country	Player	Rank^{1}	Seed
FRA	Julien Benneteau	FRA	Nicolas Mahut	31	1
CRO	Mate Pavić	AUT	Alexander Peya	61	2
IND	Rohan Bopanna	IND	Jeevan Nedunchezhiyan	105	3
NED	Wesley Koolhof	NED	Matwé Middelkoop	124	4

- ^{1} Rankings are as of February 13, 2017.

=== Other entrants ===
The following pairs received wildcards into the main draw:

- (Australia) Nick Kyrgios / (Australia) Matt Reid
- (Austria) Lucas Miedler / (Austria) Maximilian Neuchrist

The following pair received entry as alternates:

- (France) Maxime Chazal / (France) David Guez
