= 2019 Open 13 Provence =

Men's tennis tournament in Marseille, France

Coordinates: 43.2710°N 5.4010°E

- Date: 18–24 February
- Edition: 27th
- Category: ATP 250 Series
- Draw: 28S / 16D
- Prize money: €668,485
- Surface: Hard / indoors
- Location: Marseille, France
- Venue: Palais des Sports de Marseille

Champions

Singles
- (Greece) Stefanos Tsitsipas

Doubles
- (France) Jérémy Chardy / (France) Fabrice Martin
- Open 13 Provence

The 2019 Open 13 Provence was a men's tennis tournament played on indoor hard courts. It was the 27th edition of the Open 13, and part of the ATP Tour 250 series of the 2019 ATP Tour. It took place at the Palais des Sports in Marseille, France, from 18 February through 24 February 2019. First-seeded Stefanos Tsitsipas won the singles title.

== Finals ==
=== Singles ===
- (Greece) Stefanos Tsitsipas defeated (Kazakhstan) Mikhail Kukushkin, 7–5, 7–6^{(7–5)}

=== Doubles ===
- (France) Jérémy Chardy / (France) Fabrice Martin defeated (Japan) Ben McLachlan / (Netherlands) Matwé Middelkoop, 6–3, 6–7^{(4–7)}, [10–3]

== Singles main-draw entrants ==
=== Seeds ===
Country	Player	Rank^{1}	Seed
GRE	Stefanos Tsitsipas	12	1
CRO	Borna Ćorić	13	2
BEL	David Goffin	21	3
CAN	Denis Shapovalov	25	4
ESP	Fernando Verdasco	26	5
FRA	Gilles Simon	31	6
~~FRA~~	~~Gaël Monfils~~	~~33~~	~~7~~
FRA	Jérémy Chardy	35	8

- Rankings are as of February 11, 2019.

=== Other entrants ===
The following players received wildcards into the main draw:

- (France) Antoine Hoang
- (France) Ugo Humbert
- (France) Jo-Wilfried Tsonga

The following player received entry into the singles main draw using a protected ranking:

- (Belgium) Steve Darcis

The following players received entry from the qualifying draw:

- (Germany) Matthias Bachinger
- (Italy) Simone Bolelli
- (Belarus) Egor Gerasimov
- (France) Constant Lestienne

The following players received entry as lucky losers:

- (France) Grégoire Barrère
- (Ukraine) Sergiy Stakhovsky

=== Withdrawals ===
Before the tournament

- (South Korea) Chung Hyeon → replaced by (Ukraine) Sergiy Stakhovsky
- (Australia) Matthew Ebden → replaced by (United States) Denis Kudla
- (United Kingdom) Kyle Edmund → replaced by (Germany) Peter Gojowczyk
- (Hungary) Márton Fucsovics → replaced by (Czech Republic) Jiří Veselý
- (France) Pierre-Hugues Herbert → replaced by (Poland) Hubert Hurkacz
- (Russia) Karen Khachanov → replaced by (Latvia) Ernests Gulbis
- (France) Gaël Monfils → replaced by (France) Grégoire Barrère
- (United Kingdom) Andy Murray → replaced by (Russia) Andrey Rublev

== Doubles main-draw entrants ==
=== Seeds ===
Country	Player	Country	Player	Rank^{1}	Seed
AUT	Oliver Marach	CRO	Mate Pavić	15	1
RSA	Raven Klaasen	NZL	Michael Venus	26	2
JPN	Ben McLachlan	NED	Matwé Middelkoop	67	3
UKR	Denys Molchanov	SVK	Igor Zelenay	129	4

- ^{1} Rankings are as of February 11, 2019.

=== Other entrants ===
The following pairs received wildcards into the main draw:

- (India) Jeevan Nedunchezhiyan / (India) Purav Raja
- (Greece) Petros Tsitsipas / (Greece) Stefanos Tsitsipas

=== Withdrawals ===
- (Italy) Simone Bolelli
