= 2017 Open 13 Provence – Singles =

Singles
- 2017 Open 13 Provence

Final
- Champion: (France) Jo-Wilfried Tsonga
- Runner-up: (France) Lucas Pouille
- Score: 6–4, 6–4

Details
- Draw: 28 (4 Q / 3 WC )
- Seeds: 8

Events
Singles	Doubles
← 2016 ·	Open 13	· 2018 →

Nick Kyrgios was the defending champion, but lost in the semifinals to Jo-Wilfried Tsonga.

Tsonga went on to win the title, defeating Lucas Pouille in the final, 6–4, 6–4.

== Seeds ==
The top four seeds receive a bye into the second round.

1. (France) Gaël Monfils (quarterfinals)
2. (France) Jo-Wilfried Tsonga (champion)
3. (Australia) Nick Kyrgios (semifinals)
4. (France) Lucas Pouille (final)
5. (Germany) Alexander Zverev (first round)
6. (France) Richard Gasquet (semifinals)
7. (France) Gilles Simon (quarterfinals)
8. (France) Benoît Paire (first round)

== Draw ==
=== Key ===
- Q = Qualifier
- WC = Wild card
- LL = Lucky loser
- Alt = Alternate
- SE = Special exempt
- PR = Protected ranking
- ITF = ITF entry
- JE = Junior exempt
- w/o = Walkover
- r = Retired
- d = Defaulted
- SR = Special ranking

=== Finals ===
Semifinals
6	(France) Richard Gasquet	5	3
4	(France) Lucas Pouille	7	6
3	(Australia) Nick Kyrgios	6^{5}	6	4
2	(France) Jo-Wilfried Tsonga	7^{7}	2	6

Final
4	(France) Lucas Pouille	4	4
2	(France) Jo-Wilfried Tsonga	6	6

=== Top half ===
First round
Q	(Ukraine) S Stakhovsky	6	6
(Czech Republic) J Veselý	2	4
WC	(Greece) S Tsitsipas	1	6	5
(Russia) M Youzhny	6	4	7
(Netherlands) R Haase	7^{7}	3	2
6	(France) R Gasquet	6^{5}	6	6
(United Kingdom) A Bedene	3	6	6
(France) P-H Mathieu	6	1	4
(France) J Chardy	3	5
(Germany) J-L Struff	6	7
(Russia) D Medvedev	5	7	7^{7}
8	(France) B Paire	7	5	6^{4}

Second round
1	(France) G Monfils	6	6
Q	(Ukraine) S Stakhovsky	1	4
(Russia) M Youzhny	5	2
6	(France) R Gasquet	7	6
4	(France) L Pouille	7	7
(United Kingdom) A Bedene	5	5
(Germany) J-L Struff	3	6	6^{3}
(Russia) D Medvedev	6	3	7^{7}

Quarterfinals
1	(France) G Monfils	7^{7}	4	2
6	(France) R Gasquet	6^{5}	6	6
4	(France) L Pouille	4	6	6
(Russia) D Medvedev	6	1	4

Semifinals
6	(France) R Gasquet	5	3
4	(France) L Pouille	7	6

=== Bottom half ===
First round
5	(Germany) A Zverev	6^{5}	6^{5}
(France) N Mahut	7^{7}	7^{7}
Q	(Slovakia) N Gombos	6	6
Q	(Russia) E Donskoy	1	1
(Russia) A Kuznetsov	3	3
(Tunisia) M Jaziri	6	6
7	(France) G Simon	4	7	6
(Russia) K Khachanov	6	5	3
WC	(France) J Benneteau	7	6
WC	(Canada) D Shapovalov	5	4
Q	(Russia) A Rublev	1	6^{6}
(Ukraine) I Marchenko	6	7^{8}

Second round
(France) N Mahut	5	6	6^{5}
Q	(Slovakia) N Gombos	7	3	7^{7}
(Tunisia) M Jaziri	4	2
3	(Australia) N Kyrgios	6	6
7	(France) G Simon	6	2	6
WC	(France) J Benneteau	2	6	3
(Ukraine) I Marchenko	3	3
2	(France) J-W Tsonga	6	6

Quarterfinals
Q	(Slovakia) N Gombos	3	3
3	(Australia) N Kyrgios	6	6
7	(France) G Simon	4	1
2	(France) J-W Tsonga	6	6

Semifinals
3	(Australia) N Kyrgios	6^{5}	6	4
2	(France) J-W Tsonga	7^{7}	2	6

== Qualifying ==
=== Seeds ===
1. (Ukraine) Sergiy Stakhovsky (qualified)
2. (Russia) Andrey Rublev (qualified)
3. (Russia) Evgeny Donskoy (qualified)
4. (Slovakia) Norbert Gombos (qualified)
5. (Italy) Thomas Fabbiano (qualifying competition)
6. (France) Vincent Millot (qualifying competition)
7. (Czech Republic) Lukáš Rosol (qualifying competition)
8. (Hungary) Márton Fucsovics (first round)

=== Qualifiers ===
1. (Ukraine) Sergiy Stakhovsky
2. (Russia) Andrey Rublev
3. (Russia) Evgeny Donskoy
4. (Slovakia) Norbert Gombos

=== Qualifying draw ===
==== First qualifier ====
First round
1	(Ukraine) Sergiy Stakhovsky	7^{7}	6
(Canada) Steven Diez	6^{4}	2
PR	(Austria) Jürgen Melzer	6	6^{2}	3
5	(Italy) Thomas Fabbiano	3	7^{7}	6

Qualifying competition
1	(Ukraine) Sergiy Stakhovsky	3	7^{7}	6
5	(Italy) Thomas Fabbiano	6	6^{3}	4

==== Second qualifier ====
First round
2	(Russia) Andrey Rublev	2	6	6
(Czech Republic) Jan Šátral	6	3	3
(Spain) Albert Montañés	0	6	6
8	(Hungary) Márton Fucsovics	6	4	4

Qualifying competition
2	(Russia) Andrey Rublev	6	6
(Spain) Albert Montañés	3	2

==== Third qualifier ====
First round
3	(Russia) Evgeny Donskoy	6	6
WC	(France) Maxime Hamou	2	1
Alt	(France) Jonathan Eysseric	3	3
7	(Czech Republic) Lukáš Rosol	6	6

Qualifying competition
3	(Russia) Evgeny Donskoy	6	7^{7}
7	(Czech Republic) Lukáš Rosol	4	6^{4}

==== Fourth qualifier ====
First round
4	(Slovakia) Norbert Gombos	6^{4}	7^{7}	6
(Spain) Enrique López Pérez	7^{7}	6^{5}	4
WC	(France) Maxime Chazal	7^{7}	1	4
6	(France) Vincent Millot	6^{4}	6	6

Qualifying competition
4	(Slovakia) Norbert Gombos	7^{7}	6
6	(France) Vincent Millot	6^{4}	3
