= 2018 Open 13 Provence – Singles =

Singles
- 2018 Open 13 Provence

Final
- Champion: (Russia) Karen Khachanov
- Runner-up: (France) Lucas Pouille
- Score: 7–5, 3–6, 7–5

Details
- Draw: 28 (4 Q / 3 WC )
- Seeds: 8

Events
Singles	Doubles
← 2017 ·	Open 13	· 2019 →

Jo-Wilfried Tsonga was the defending champion, but withdrew before the tournament began.

Karen Khachanov won the title, defeating Lucas Pouille in the final, 7–5, 3–6, 7–5.

== Seeds ==
The top four seeds who played received a bye into the second round.

1. (Belgium) David Goffin (withdrew due to eye injury)
2. (Switzerland) Stan Wawrinka (second round, retired)
3. (France) Lucas Pouille (final)
4. (Czech Republic) Tomáš Berdych (semifinals)
5. (Spain) Roberto Bautista Agut (second round)
6. (Luxembourg) Gilles Müller (second round)
7. (Bosnia and Herzegovina) Damir Džumhur (quarterfinals, retired)
8. (Serbia) Filip Krajinović (quarterfinals)
9. (Russia) Karen Khachanov (champion)

== Draw ==
=== Key ===
- Q = Qualifier
- WC = Wild card
- LL = Lucky loser
- Alt = Alternate
- SE = Special exempt
- PR = Protected ranking
- ITF = ITF entry
- JE = Junior exempt
- w/o = Walkover
- r = Retired
- d = Defaulted
- SR = Special ranking

=== Finals ===
Semifinals
9	(Russia) Karen Khachanov	6	6
4	(Czech Republic) Tomáš Berdych	3	2
3	(France) Lucas Pouille	6	7^{8}
Q	(Belarus) Ilya Ivashka	3	6^{6}

Final
9	(Russia) Karen Khachanov	7	3	7
3	(France) Lucas Pouille	5	6	5

=== Top half ===
First round
(Tunisia) M Jaziri	4	3
(France) J Benneteau	6	6
(Germany) M Zverev	6	6
Alt	(Slovenia) B Kavčič	4	4
Q	(Belgium) R Bemelmans	3	6^{2}
9	(Russia) K Khachanov	6	7^{7}
WC	(France) H Gaston	2	2
Q	(Italy) S Travaglia	6	6
(Italy) T Fabbiano	6	6
WC	(Canada) F Auger-Aliassime	3	4
(Kazakhstan) M Kukushkin	7^{8}	6^{3}	1
7	(Bosnia and Herzegovina) D Džumhur	6^{6}	7^{7}	6

Second round
5/WC	(Spain) R Bautista Agut	6^{2}	6^{5}
(France) J Benneteau	7^{7}	7^{7}
(Germany) M Zverev	2	1
9	(Russia) K Khachanov	6	6
4	(Czech Republic) T Berdych	5	7^{7}	6
Q	(Italy) S Travaglia	7	6^{4}	3
(Italy) T Fabbiano	7^{7}	6^{7}	6^{5}
7	(Bosnia and Herzegovina) D Džumhur	6^{5}	7^{9}	7^{7}

Quarterfinals
(France) J Benneteau	4	4
9	(Russia) K Khachanov	6	6
4	(Czech Republic) T Berdych	7^{7}	0
7	(Bosnia and Herzegovina) D Džumhur	6^{4}	0^{r}

Semifinals
9	(Russia) K Khachanov	6	6
4	(Czech Republic) T Berdych	3	2

=== Bottom half ===
First round
8	(Serbia) F Krajinović	3	6	6
(Portugal) J Sousa	6	4	4
(Germany) M Marterer	6^{3}	6^{4}
(France) G Simon	7^{7}	7^{7}
(France) P-H Herbert	6	7^{7}
Q	(Slovakia) N Gombos	2	6^{3}
6	(Luxembourg) G Müller	7	6
LL	(Ukraine) S Stakhovsky	5	3
(France) N Mahut	7	7^{7}
(Greece) S Tsitsipas	5	6^{4}
(Serbia) L Đere	3	1
Q	(Belarus) I Ivashka	6	6

Second round
8	(Serbia) F Krajinović	6	6
(France) G Simon	3	3
(France) P-H Herbert	6	6^{6}	4
3	(France) L Pouille	3	7^{8}	6
6	(Luxembourg) G Müller	6	2	4
(France) N Mahut	3	6	6
Q	(Belarus) I Ivashka	6	1
2	(Switzerland) S Wawrinka	4	1^{r}

Quarterfinals
8	(Serbia) F Krajinović	6^{5}	6	4
3	(France) L Pouille	7^{7}	3	6
(France) N Mahut	6	3	5
Q	(Belarus) I Ivashka	4	6	7

Semifinals
3	(France) L Pouille	6	7^{8}
Q	(Belarus) I Ivashka	3	6^{6}

== Qualifying ==
=== Seeds ===
1. (France) Quentin Halys (first round)
2. (Belgium) Ruben Bemelmans (qualified)
3. (Ukraine) Sergiy Stakhovsky (qualifying competition, lucky loser)
4. (Italy) Stefano Travaglia (qualified)
5. (Slovakia) Norbert Gombos (qualified)
6. (Germany) Oscar Otte (first round)
7. (Germany) Yannick Maden (qualifying competition)
8. (France) Calvin Hemery (qualifying competition)

=== Qualifiers ===
1. (Belarus) Ilya Ivashka
2. (Belgium) Ruben Bemelmans
3. (Slovakia) Norbert Gombos
4. (Italy) Stefano Travaglia

=== Lucky loser ===
1. (Ukraine) Sergiy Stakhovsky

=== Qualifying draw ===
==== First qualifier ====
First round
1	(France) Quentin Halys	3	4
(France) Kenny de Schepper	6	6
(Belarus) Ilya Ivashka	4	6	7^{7}
6	(Germany) Oscar Otte	6	1	6^{3}

Qualifying competition
(France) Kenny de Schepper	3	4
(Belarus) Ilya Ivashka	6	6

==== Second qualifier ====
First round
2	(Belgium) Ruben Bemelmans	6	6
(Spain) Javier Martí	1	1
Alt	(France) Geoffrey Blancaneaux	6^{4}	2
8	(France) Calvin Hemery	7^{7}	6

Qualifying competition
2	(Belgium) Ruben Bemelmans	6	6
8	(France) Calvin Hemery	4	4

==== Third qualifier ====
First round
3	(Ukraine) Sergiy Stakhovsky	1	6	7
(Germany) Matthias Bachinger	6	1	5
WC	(France) Antoine Hoang	4	2
5	(Slovakia) Norbert Gombos	6	6

Qualifying competition
3	(Ukraine) Sergiy Stakhovsky	4	2
5	(Slovakia) Norbert Gombos	6	6

==== Fourth qualifier ====
First round
4	(Italy) Stefano Travaglia	7^{7}	6
WC	(Australia) Alexei Popyrin	6^{4}	2
(Spain) Ricardo Ojeda Lara	1	0
7	(Germany) Yannick Maden	6	6

Qualifying competition
4	(Italy) Stefano Travaglia	7^{7}	7^{9}
7	(Germany) Yannick Maden	6^{1}	6^{7}
