= 2019 Open 13 Provence – Singles =

Singles
- 2019 Open 13 Provence

Final
- Champion: (Greece) Stefanos Tsitsipas
- Runner-up: (Kazakhstan) Mikhail Kukushkin
- Score: 7–5, 7–6^{(7–5)}

Details
- Draw: 28 (4 Q / 3 WC )
- Seeds: 8

Events
Singles	Doubles
← 2018 ·	Open 13	· 2020 →

Karen Khachanov was the defending champion, but withdrew before the tournament began.

Stefanos Tsitsipas won the title, defeating Mikhail Kukushkin in the final, 7–5, 7–6^{(7–5)}.

== Seeds ==
The top four seeds received a bye into the second round.

1. (Greece) Stefanos Tsitsipas (champion)
2. (Croatia) Borna Ćorić (second round)
3. (Belgium) David Goffin (semifinals)
4. (Canada) Denis Shapovalov (second round)
5. (Spain) Fernando Verdasco (second round)
6. (France) Gilles Simon (quarterfinals)
7. (France) Gaël Monfils (withdrew)
8. (France) Jérémy Chardy (first round)

== Draw ==
=== Key ===
- Q = Qualifier
- WC = Wild card
- LL = Lucky loser
- Alt = Alternate
- SE = Special exempt
- PR = Protected ranking
- ITF = ITF entry
- JE = Junior exempt
- w/o = Walkover
- r = Retired
- d = Defaulted
- SR = Special ranking

=== Finals ===
Semifinals
1	(Greece) Stefanos Tsitsipas	7^{7}	6
3	(Belgium) David Goffin	6^{1}	2
(Kazakhstan) Mikhail Kukushkin	6	6
WC	(France) Ugo Humbert	4	4

Final
1	(Greece) Stefanos Tsitsipas	7	7^{7}
(Kazakhstan) Mikhail Kukushkin	5	6^{5}

=== Top half ===
First round
(Poland) H Hurkacz	6	6
(Serbia) F Krajinović	3	2
Q	(France) C Lestienne	6^{3}	6	3
LL	(Ukraine) S Stakhovsky	7^{7}	1	6
(Czech Republic) J Veselý	6^{3}	3
LL	(France) G Barrère	7^{7}	6
Q	(Italy) S Bolelli	4	6^{1}
(France) B Paire	6	7^{7}
(Germany) P Gojowczyk	6	6
(Bosnia and Herzegovina) D Džumhur	2	4
WC	(France) A Hoang	7	3	3
6	(France) G Simon	5	6	6

Second round
1	(Greece) S Tsitsipas	6	6
(Poland) H Hurkacz	4	2
LL	(Ukraine) S Stakhovsky	6	6
LL	(France) G Barrère	3	4
3	(Belgium) D Goffin	6	6
(France) B Paire	2	3
(Germany) P Gojowczyk	6	4	2
6	(France) G Simon	4	6	6

Quarterfinals
1	(Greece) S Tsitsipas	6	6
LL	(Ukraine) S Stakhovsky	4	3
3	(Belgium) D Goffin	6	6
6	(France) G Simon	2	4

Semifinals
1	(Greece) S Tsitsipas	7^{7}	6
3	(Belgium) D Goffin	6^{1}	2

=== Bottom half ===
First round
8	(France) J Chardy	6^{12}	6^{0}
(Italy) M Berrettini	7^{14}	7^{7}
WC	(France) J-W Tsonga	6	4	2
(Russia) A Rublev	2	6	6
(United States) D Kudla	3	3
(Kazakhstan) M Kukushkin	6	6
5	(Spain) F Verdasco	4	6	7
Q	(Belarus) E Gerasimov	6	3	5
Q	(Germany) M Bachinger	4	6	6
PR	(Belgium) S Darcis	6	3	4
(Latvia) E Gulbis	3	6^{3}
WC	(France) U Humbert	6	7^{7}

Second round
(Italy) M Berrettini	3	6^{2}
(Russia) A Rublev	6	7^{7}
(Kazakhstan) M Kukushkin	6	7^{7}
4	(Canada) D Shapovalov	4	6^{4}
5	(Spain) F Verdasco	4	3
Q	(Germany) M Bachinger	6	6
WC	(France) U Humbert	6	6
2	(Croatia) B Ćorić	3	3

Quarterfinals
(Russia) A Rublev	4	1
(Kazakhstan) M Kukushkin	6	6
Q	(Germany) M Bachinger	3	3
WC	(France) U Humbert	6	6

Semifinals
(Kazakhstan) M Kukushkin	6	6
WC	(France) U Humbert	4	4

== Qualifying ==
=== Seeds ===
1. (Belarus) Ilya Ivashka (first round)
2. (France) Grégoire Barrère (qualifying competition, lucky loser)
3. (Belgium) Ruben Bemelmans (first round)
4. (Ukraine) Sergiy Stakhovsky (qualifying competition, lucky loser)
5. (Italy) Simone Bolelli (qualified)
6. (Germany) Matthias Bachinger (qualified)
7. (Czech Republic) Lukáš Rosol (first round)
8. (France) Constant Lestienne (qualified)

=== Qualifiers ===
1. (Italy) Simone Bolelli
2. (Belarus) Egor Gerasimov
3. (Germany) Matthias Bachinger
4. (France) Constant Lestienne

=== Lucky losers ===
1. (Ukraine) Sergiy Stakhovsky
2. (France) Grégoire Barrère

=== Qualifying draw ===
==== First qualifier ====
First round
1	(Belarus) Ilya Ivashka	2	4
WC	(France) Maxime Janvier	6	6
WC	(France) Alexandre Müller	4	4
5	(Italy) Simone Bolelli	6	6

Qualifying competition
WC	(France) Maxime Janvier	4	5
5	(Italy) Simone Bolelli	6	7

==== Second qualifier ====
First round
2	(France) Grégoire Barrère	6	6
(Austria) Sebastian Ofner	4	4
(Belarus) Egor Gerasimov	6	4	6
7	(Czech Republic) Lukáš Rosol	4	6	3

Qualifying competition
2	(France) Grégoire Barrère	2	5
(Belarus) Egor Gerasimov	6	7

==== Third qualifier ====
First round
3	(Belgium) Ruben Bemelmans	5	4
(Russia) Alexey Vatutin	7	6
(Germany) Oscar Otte	3	3^{r}
6	(Germany) Matthias Bachinger	6	4

Qualifying competition
(Russia) Alexey Vatutin	6^{6}	4
6	(Germany) Matthias Bachinger	7^{8}	6

==== Fourth qualifier ====
First round
4	(Ukraine) Sergiy Stakhovsky	4	6	6
(Bosnia and Herzegovina) Mirza Bašić	6	1	3
Alt	(Germany) Mats Moraing	5	6	3
8	(France) Constant Lestienne	7	4	6

Qualifying competition
4	(Ukraine) Sergiy Stakhovsky	5	6	5
8	(France) Constant Lestienne	7	1	7
