= 2017 Open 13 Provence – Doubles =

Doubles
- 2017 Open 13 Provence

Final
- Champions: (France) Julien Benneteau (France) Nicolas Mahut
- Runners-up: (Netherlands) Robin Haase (United Kingdom) Dominic Inglot
- Score: 6–4, 6–7^{(9–11)}, [10–5]

Events
Singles	Doubles
← 2016 ·	Open 13	· 2018 →

Mate Pavić and Michael Venus were the defending champions, but Venus chose to compete in Delray Beach instead. Pavić played alongside Alexander Peya, but lost in the quarterfinals to Robin Haase and Dominic Inglot.

Julien Benneteau and Nicolas Mahut won the title, defeating Haase and Inglot in the final, 6–4, 6–7^{(9–11)}, [10–5].

== Seeds ==
1. (France) Julien Benneteau / (France) Nicolas Mahut (champions)
2. (Croatia) Mate Pavić / (Austria) Alexander Peya (quarterfinals)
3. (India) Rohan Bopanna / (India) Jeevan Nedunchezhiyan (first round)
4. (Netherlands) Wesley Koolhof / (Netherlands) Matwé Middelkoop (quarterfinals)

== Draw ==
=== Key ===
- Q = Qualifier
- WC = Wild card
- LL = Lucky loser
- Alt = Alternate
- SE = Special exempt
- PR = Protected ranking
- ITF = ITF entry
- JE = Junior exempt
- w/o = Walkover
- r = Retired
- d = Defaulted
- SR = Special ranking

=== Draw ===
First round
1	(France) J Benneteau (France) N Mahut	6^{6}	6	[11]
PR	(Austria) J Melzer (France) L Pouille	7^{8}	3	[9]
WC	(Austria) L Miedler (Austria) M Neuchrist	6^{2}	0
(United States) J Cerretani (Austria) P Oswald	7^{7}	6
4	(Netherlands) W Koolhof (Netherlands) M Middelkoop	6	7^{7}
(Sweden) J Brunström (Sweden) A Siljeström	3	6^{3}
(Czech Republic) R Jebavý (Czech Republic) J Veselý	7^{7}	4	[9]
(France) J Chardy (France) J Eysseric	6^{4}	6	[11]
(Tunisia) M Jaziri (Croatia) A Šančić	7^{7}	4	[6]
Alt	(France) M Chazal (France) D Guez	6^{3}	6	[10]
WC	(Australia) N Kyrgios (Australia) M Reid	6	6
3	(India) R Bopanna (India) J Nedunchezhiyan	4	4
(Germany) P Petzschner (Pakistan) A-u-H Qureshi	6^{5}	3
(Netherlands) R Haase (United Kingdom) D Inglot	7^{7}	6
(United Kingdom) K Skupski (United Kingdom) N Skupski	2	3
2	(Croatia) M Pavić (Austria) A Peya	6	6

Quarterfinals
1	(France) J Benneteau (France) N Mahut	6	6
(United States) J Cerretani (Austria) P Oswald	3	2
4	(Netherlands) W Koolhof (Netherlands) M Middelkoop	6^{6}	4
(France) J Chardy (France) J Eysseric	7^{8}	6
Alt	(France) M Chazal (France) D Guez	2	6	[4]
WC	(Australia) N Kyrgios (Australia) M Reid	6	2	[10]
(Netherlands) R Haase (United Kingdom) D Inglot	7^{8}	6
2	(Croatia) M Pavić (Austria) A Peya	6^{6}	3

Semifinals
1	(France) J Benneteau (France) N Mahut	6	6^{3}	[10]
(France) J Chardy (France) J Eysseric	4	7^{7}	[3]
WC	(Australia) N Kyrgios (Australia) M Reid	6	6^{5}	[8]
(Netherlands) R Haase (United Kingdom) D Inglot	3	7^{7}	[10]

Final
1	(France) J Benneteau (France) N Mahut	6	6^{9}	[10]
(Netherlands) R Haase (United Kingdom) D Inglot	4	7^{11}	[5]
