= 2019 Open 13 Provence – Doubles =

Doubles
- 2019 Open 13 Provence

Final
- Champions: (France) Jérémy Chardy (France) Fabrice Martin
- Runners-up: (Japan) Ben McLachlan (Netherlands) Matwé Middelkoop
- Score: 6–3, 6–7^{(4–7)}, [10–3]

Events
Singles	Doubles
- Open 13

Raven Klaasen and Michael Venus were the defending champions, but lost in the first round to Jonathan Eysseric and Gilles Simon.

Jérémy Chardy and Fabrice Martin won the title, defeating Ben McLachlan and Matwé Middelkoop in the final, 6–3, 6–7^{(4–7)}, [10–3].

== Seeds ==
1. (Austria) Oliver Marach / (Croatia) Mate Pavić (first round)
2. (South Africa) Raven Klaasen / (New Zealand) Michael Venus (first round)
3. (Japan) Ben McLachlan / (Netherlands) Matwé Middelkoop (final)
4. (Ukraine) Denys Molchanov / (Slovakia) Igor Zelenay (quarterfinals)

== Draw ==
Key

- Q = Qualifier
- WC = Wild card
- LL = Lucky loser
- Alt = Alternate
- ITF = ITF entry
- PR = Protected ranking
- SR = Special ranking
- SE = Special exempt
- JE = Junior exempt
- JR = Junior Accelerator Programme entrant
- CO = College Accelerator Programme entrant
- NG = Next Gen Accelerator Program entrant
- w/o = Walkover
- r = Retired
- d = Defaulted

=== Draw ===
First round
1	(Austria) O Marach (Croatia) M Pavić	2	4
WC	(India) J Nedunchezhiyan (India) P Raja	6	6
(Austria) J Melzer (Austria) P Oswald	w/o
(Italy) M Berrettini (Italy) S Bolelli
3	(Japan) B McLachlan (Netherlands) M Middelkoop	6	6^{5}	[10]
(Monaco) R Arneodo (Bosnia and Herzegovina) D Džumhur	4	7^{7}	[8]
(Chinese Taipei) C-p Hsieh (Indonesia) C Rungkat	6	7^{7}
(United States) D Kudla (Spain) D Marrero	4	6^{5}
(Germany) A Begemann (Australia) R Junaid	4	6^{4}
(France) J Chardy (France) F Martin	6	7^{7}
(Spain) G Granollers (France) B Paire	4	6^{5}
4	(Ukraine) D Molchanov (Slovakia) I Zelenay	6	7^{7}
WC	(Greece) Pe Tsitsipas (Greece) S Tsitsipas	1	5
(Netherlands) S Arends (Austria) T-S Weissborn	6	7
(France) J Eysseric (France) G Simon	4	6	[10]
2	(South Africa) R Klaasen (New Zealand) M Venus	6	3	[6]

Quarterfinals
WC	(India) J Nedunchezhiyan (India) P Raja	6^{4}	7^{8}	[8]
(Austria) J Melzer (Austria) P Oswald	7^{7}	6^{6}	[10]
3	(Japan) B McLachlan (Netherlands) M Middelkoop	6	6
(Chinese Taipei) C-p Hsieh (Indonesia) C Rungkat	3	2
(France) J Chardy (France) F Martin	6	6
4	(Ukraine) D Molchanov (Slovakia) I Zelenay	3	4
(Netherlands) S Arends (Austria) T-S Weissborn	3	6	[11]
(France) J Eysseric (France) G Simon	6	3	[9]

Semifinals
(Austria) J Melzer (Austria) P Oswald	6	5	[7]
3	(Japan) B McLachlan (Netherlands) M Middelkoop	3	7	[10]
(France) J Chardy (France) F Martin	6	7
(Netherlands) S Arends (Austria) T-S Weissborn	3	5

Final
3	(Japan) B McLachlan (Netherlands) M Middelkoop	3	7^{7}	[3]
(France) J Chardy (France) F Martin	6	6^{4}	[10]
