= 2009 SA Tennis Open – Doubles =

Doubles
- 2009 SA Tennis Open

Final
- Champions: (United States) James Cerretani (Belgium) Dick Norman
- Runners-up: (South Africa) Rik de Voest (Australia) Ashley Fisher
- Score: 6–7^{(7–9)}, 6–2, [14–12]

Events
Singles	Doubles
← 2008 ·	SA Tennis Open	· 2010 →

James Cerretani and Dick Norman won the title, defeating Rik de Voest and Ashley Fisher 6–7^{(7–9)}, 6–2, [14–12] in the final.

== Seeds ==
1. (South Africa) Jeff Coetzee / (South Africa) Wesley Moodie (semifinals)
2. (United States) Eric Butorac / (United Kingdom) Ross Hutchins (first round)
3. (Spain) Marcel Granollers / (Spain) Santiago Ventura (quarterfinals)
4. (South Africa) Rik de Voest / (Australia) Ashley Fisher (final)

== Draw ==
=== Key ===
- Q = Qualifier
- WC = Wild card
- LL = Lucky loser
- Alt = Alternate
- SE = Special exempt
- PR = Protected ranking
- ITF = ITF entry
- JE = Junior exempt
- w/o = Walkover
- r = Retired
- d = Defaulted
- SR = Special ranking

=== Draw ===
First round
1	(South Africa) J Coetzee (South Africa) W Moodie	6	6^{5}	[10]
WC	(South Africa) C Haggard (South Africa) R Klaasen	4	7^{7}	[8]
(Cyprus) M Baghdatis (France) J Chardy	3	2
(Czech Republic) J Levinský (Switzerland) J-C Scherrer	6	6
4	(South Africa) R de Voest (Australia) A Fisher	6	6
(Switzerland) Y Allegro (Romania) H Tecău	2	2
ALT	(Italy) F Cipolla (Germany) B Phau	6	6
(Spain) G García-López (Spain) R Ramírez Hidalgo	3	3
(Uzbekistan) D Istomin (Austria) D Köllerer	4	2
(Spain) D Ferrer (Spain) I Navarro	6	6
(South Africa) K Anderson (France) J-W Tsonga	4	6	[8]
3	(Spain) M Granollers (Spain) S Ventura	6	3	[10]
(Portugal) F Gil (Germany) F Moser	4	4
(United States) J Cerretani (Belgium) D Norman	6	6
WC	(South Africa) I van der Merwe (South Africa) F Wolmarans	6	7
2	(United States) E Butorac (United Kingdom) R Hutchins	4	5

Quarterfinals
1	(South Africa) J Coetzee (South Africa) W Moodie	6	1	[10]
(Czech Republic) J Levinský (Switzerland) J-C Scherrer	4	6	[6]
4	(South Africa) R de Voest (Australia) A Fisher	7	6
ALT	(Italy) F Cipolla (Germany) B Phau	5	4
(Spain) D Ferrer (Spain) I Navarro	6	4	[13]
3	(Spain) M Granollers (Spain) S Ventura	3	6	[11]
(United States) J Cerretani (Belgium) D Norman	6	6
WC	(South Africa) I van der Merwe (South Africa) F Wolmarans	4	4

Semifinals
1	(South Africa) J Coetzee (South Africa) W Moodie	5	4
4	(South Africa) R de Voest (Australia) A Fisher	7	6
(Spain) D Ferrer (Spain) I Navarro	3	2
(United States) J Cerretani (Belgium) D Norman	6	6

Final
4	(South Africa) R de Voest (Australia) A Fisher	7^{9}	2	[12]
(United States) J Cerretani (Belgium) D Norman	6^{7}	6	[14]
