= 2011 Open de Nice Côte d'Azur – Singles qualifying =

This article displays the qualifying draw of the 2011 Open de Nice Côte d'Azur.

== Players ==
=== Seeds ===
1. (Netherlands) Robin Haase (qualifying competition) (lucky loser)
2. (United States) Ryan Sweeting (second round)
3. (Spain) Pere Riba (qualified)
4. (Portugal) Frederico Gil (first round)
5. (United States) Michael Russell (qualifying competition) (lucky loser)
6. (Austria) Andreas Haider-Maurer (qualified)
7. (Germany) Mischa Zverev (first round)
8. (France) Benoît Paire (qualified)

=== Qualifiers ===
1. (Austria) Andreas Haider-Maurer
2. (France) Benoît Paire
3. (Spain) Pere Riba
4. (France) Guillaume Rufin

=== Lucky losers ===
1. (Netherlands) Robin Haase
2. (United States) Michael Russell

== Qualifying draw ==
=== First qualifier ===
First round
1	(Netherlands) Robin Haase	6	6
(Spain) Gerard Granollers	1	4
(France) Mathieu Rodrigues	5	0^{r}
(Slovakia) Pavol Červenák	7	2
(Brazil) Caio Zampieri	3	3
(France) Vincent Millot	6	6
(United States) Tim Smyczek	2	2
6	(Austria) Andreas Haider-Maurer	6	6

Second round
1	(Netherlands) Robin Haase	6	7
(Slovakia) Pavol Červenák	3	6^{3}
(France) Vincent Millot	3	6^{1}
6	(Austria) Andreas Haider-Maurer	6	7

Qualifying competition
1	(Netherlands) Robin Haase	3	6	4
6	(Austria) Andreas Haider-Maurer	6	0	6

=== Second qualifier ===
First round
2	(United States) Ryan Sweeting	7	6^{5}	6
(Austria) Alexander Peya	6^{4}	7	3
(Ukraine) Illya Marchenko	3	4
WC	(Monaco) Benjamin Balleret	6	6
(Ukraine) Sergei Bubka	6^{4}	6	6
(Russia) Andrey Kumantsov	7	3	3
(France) Jonathan Eysseric	3	4
8	(France) Benoît Paire	6	6

Second round
2	(United States) Ryan Sweeting	6	0	3
WC	(Monaco) Benjamin Balleret	3	6	6
(Ukraine) Sergei Bubka	7	2	4
8	(France) Benoît Paire	6^{4}	6	6

Qualifying competition
WC	(Monaco) Benjamin Balleret	6^{2}	7	0
8	(France) Benoît Paire	7	5	6

=== Third qualifier ===
First round
3	(Spain) Pere Riba	6	7
(France) Arnaud Clément	4	5
(Italy) Alberto Brizzi	6	6
WC	(France) Martin Vaïsse	1	0
(Portugal) Gastão Elias	6	6
WC	(France) Romain Arneodo	4	3
(Italy) Daniele Giorgini	1	4
5	(United States) Michael Russell	6	6

Second round
3	(Spain) Pere Riba	6	6
(Italy) Alberto Brizzi	0	2
(Portugal) Gastão Elias	3	2
5	(United States) Michael Russell	6	6

Qualifying competition
3	(Spain) Pere Riba	6	6
5	(United States) Michael Russell	2	1

=== Fourth qualifier ===
First round
4	(Portugal) Frederico Gil	7	3	6^{3}
(Germany) Dennis Blömke	5	6	7
(France) Guillaume Rufin	6	6
Alt	(Brazil) Tiago Fernandes	1	1
(Romania) Victor Crivoi	5	4
WC	(France) Clément Reix	7	6
(France) Nicolas Renavand	6	6
7	(Germany) Mischa Zverev	3	4

Second round
(Germany) Dennis Blömke	3	2
(France) Guillaume Rufin	6	6
WC	(France) Clément Reix	3	2
(France) Nicolas Renavand	6	6

Qualifying competition
(France) Guillaume Rufin	6	6
(France) Nicolas Renavand	2	1
