= 2009 MercedesCup =

- Date: 11–19 July
- Edition: 32nd
- Category: World Tour 250
- Draw: 32S / 16D
- Prize money: €398,250
- Surface: Clay / outdoor
- Location: Stuttgart, Germany
- Venue: Tennis Club Weissenhof

Champions

Singles
- (France) Jérémy Chardy

Doubles
- (Czech Republic) František Čermák / (Slovakia) Michal Mertiňák
- MercedesCup

The 2009 Mercedes Cup was a man's tennis tournament played on outdoor clay courts. It was the 32nd edition of the Stuttgart Open and was part of the ATP World Tour 250 series of the 2009 ATP World Tour. It was held at the Tennis Club Weissenhof in Stuttgart, Germany, from 11 July 11 until 19 July 2009. Jérémy Chardy won the singles title.

== Finals ==
=== Singles ===
(France) Jérémy Chardy defeated (Romania) Victor Hănescu, 1–6, 6–3, 6–4

- It was Chardy's first career title.

=== Doubles ===
(Czech Republic) František Čermák / (Slovakia) Michal Mertiňák defeated (Romania) Victor Hănescu / (Romania) Horia Tecău, 7–5, 6–4

== ATP entrants ==
=== Seeds ===
Player	Nationality	Ranking*	Seeding
Gilles Simon	France	7	1
Nikolay Davydenko	Russia	11	2
Tomáš Berdych	Czech Republic	20	3
Victor Hănescu	Romania	26	4
Philipp Kohlschreiber	Germany	29	5
Albert Montañés	Spain	32	6
Fabrice Santoro	France	34	7
José Acasuso	Argentina	36	8

- Seedings are based on the rankings of July 6, 2009.

=== Other entrants ===
The following players received wildcards into the singles main draw

- (Germany) Simon Greul
- (Austria) Stefan Koubek
- (Germany) Michael Berrer

The following players received entry from the qualifying draw:

- (Poland) Łukasz Kubot
- (Spain) Pablo Andújar
- (Spain) Daniel Muñoz-de la Nava
- (Germany) Dominik Meffert
