= 2009 MercedesCup – Doubles =

Doubles
- 2009 Stuttgart Open

Final
- Champion: (Czech Republic) František Čermák (Slovakia) Michal Mertiňák
- Runner-up: (Romania) Victor Hănescu (Romania) Horia Tecău
- Score: 7–5, 6–4

Details
- Draw: 16
- Seeds: 4

Events
Singles	Doubles
← 2008 ·	Stuttgart Open	· 2010 →

Christopher Kas and Philipp Kohlschreiber were the defending champions, but Kohlschreiber chose not to compete that year.
Kas partnered with Mischa Zverev, but lost in the first round to František Čermák and Michal Mertiňák.

== Seeds ==
1. (Poland) Łukasz Kubot / (Austria) Oliver Marach (semifinals)
2. (Poland) Mariusz Fyrstenberg / (Brazil) Marcelo Melo (semifinals)
3. (Czech Republic) Lukáš Dlouhý / (Czech Republic) David Škoch (first round)
4. (Czech Republic) František Čermák / (Slovakia) Michal Mertiňák (champions)

== Draw ==
=== Key ===
- Q = Qualifier
- WC = Wild card
- LL = Lucky loser
- Alt = Alternate
- SE = Special exempt
- PR = Protected ranking
- ITF = ITF entry
- JE = Junior exempt
- w/o = Walkover
- r = Retired
- d = Defaulted
- SR = Special ranking

=== Draw ===
First round
1	(Poland) Ł Kubot (Austria) O Marach	6	6
(France) J Chardy (France) P-H Mathieu	3	3
WC	(United Kingdom) J Delgado (United Kingdom) J Murray	4	5
WC	(Germany) S Greul (Germany) M Kohlmann	6	7
3	(Czech Republic) L Dlouhý (Czech Republic) D Škoch	2	6	[12]
(Romania) V Hănescu (Romania) H Tecău	6	4	[14]
ALT	(Spain) P Andújar (Spain) D Muñoz-De La Nava	4	2
(Germany) A Beck (Russia) N Davydenko	6	6
(Italy) F Fognini (Argentina) D Junqueira	6^{4}	4
(Spain) I Navarro (France) G Simon	7	6
(Germany) C Kas (Germany) M Zverev	2	3
4	(Czech Republic) F Čermák (Slovakia) M Mertiňák	6	6
(Germany) P Petzschner (Germany) R Schüttler	4	3
(Argentina) J Acasuso (Argentina) M Vassallo Argüello	6	6
(Argentina) L Arnold Ker (Uruguay) P Cuevas	1	4
2	(Poland) M Fyrstenberg (Brazil) M Melo	6	6

Quarterfinals
1	(Poland) L Kubot (Austria) O Marach	6	6
WC	(Germany) S Greul (Germany) M Kohlmann	3	2
(Romania) V Hănescu (Romania) H Tecău	6	7
(Germany) A Beck (Russia) N Davydenko	3	6^{6}
(Spain) I Navarro (France) G Simon	2	0
4	(Czech Republic) F Čermák (Slovakia) M Mertiňák	6	6
(Argentina) J Acasuso (Argentina) M Vassallo Argüello	3	6^{5}
2	(Poland) M Fyrstenberg (Brazil) M Melo	6	7

Semifinals
1	(Poland) L Kubot (Austria) O Marach	4	5
(Romania) V Hănescu (Romania) H Tecău	6	7
4	(Czech Republic) F Čermák (Slovakia) M Mertiňák	3	6	[10]
2	(Poland) M Fyrstenberg (Brazil) M Melo	6	2	[4]

Final
(Romania) V Hănescu (Romania) H Tecău	5	4
4	(Czech Republic) F Čermák (Slovakia) M Mertiňák	7	6
