= 2011 Open de Nice Côte d'Azur – Singles =

Singles
- 2011 Open de Nice Côte d'Azur

Final
- Champion: (Spain) Nicolás Almagro
- Runner-up: (Romania) Victor Hănescu
- Score: 6–7^{(5–7)}, 6–3, 6–3

Details
- Draw: 28
- Seeds: 8

Events
Singles	Doubles
- Open de Nice Côte d'Azur

Richard Gasquet was the defending champion, but chose not to compete in this year.

No.3 seed Nicolás Almagro won the tournament by defeating Romanian Victor Hănescu 6–7^{(5–7)}, 6–3, 6–3 in the final. It was the 10th ATP Tournament won by Nicolás Almagro in his career.

== Seeds ==
The top four seeds received a bye into the second round.

1. (Spain) David Ferrer (quarterfinals)
2. (Czech Republic) Tomáš Berdych (semifinals)
3. (Spain) Nicolás Almagro (champion)
4. (United States) Andy Roddick (withdrew due to shoulder injury)
5. (Ukraine) Alexandr Dolgopolov (semifinals)
6. (Cyprus) Marcos Baghdatis (first round)
7. (Ukraine) Sergiy Stakhovsky (second round)
8. (Italy) Fabio Fognini (first round)

== Draw ==
Key

- Q = Qualifier
- WC = Wild card
- LL = Lucky loser
- Alt = Alternate
- ITF = ITF entry
- PR = Protected ranking
- SR = Special ranking
- SE = Special exempt
- JE = Junior exempt
- JR = Junior Accelerator Programme entrant
- CO = College Accelerator Programme entrant
- NG = Next Gen Accelerator Program entrant
- w/o = Walkover
- r = Retired
- d = Defaulted

=== Finals ===
Semifinals
5	(Ukraine) Alexandr Dolgopolov	3	3
(Romania) Victor Hănescu	6	6
3	(Spain) Nicolás Almagro	6	6
2	(Czech Republic) Tomáš Berdych	4	4

Final
(Romania) Victor Hănescu	7	3	3
3	(Spain) Nicolás Almagro	6^{5}	6	6

=== Top half ===
First round
WC	(France) É Roger-Vasselin	6	3	2
(Italy) A Seppi	3	6	6
Q	(Spain) P Riba	6	6
Q	(France) G Rufin	2	2
(Italy) F Volandri	5	3
5	(Ukraine) A Dolgopolov	7	6
Q	(France) B Paire	0	1
(Romania) V Hănescu	6	6
(Chinese Taipei) Y-h Lu	3	4
LL	(Netherlands) R Haase	6	6
(Russia) T Gabashvili	6^{5}	3
7	(Ukraine) S Stakhovsky	7	6

Second round
1	(Spain) D Ferrer	6	6
(Italy) A Seppi	3	2
Q	(Spain) P Riba	6^{5}	6^{5}
5	(Ukraine) A Dolgopolov	7	7
LL	(United States) M Russell	5	2
(Romania) V Hănescu	7	6
LL	(Netherlands) R Haase	6	6
7	(Ukraine) S Stakhovsky	2	4

Quarterfinals
1	(Spain) D Ferrer	4	6	5
5	(Ukraine) A Dolgopolov	6	1	7
(Romania) V Hănescu	6	2
LL	(Netherlands) R Haase	2	0^{r}

Semifinals
5	(Ukraine) A Dolgopolov	3	3
(Romania) V Hănescu	6	6

=== Bottom half ===
First round
6	(Cyprus) M Baghdatis	6^{3}	2
WC	(France) J Benneteau	7	6
(Spain) P Andújar	5
(Bulgaria) G Dimitrov	0^{r}
Q	(Austria) A Haider-Maurer	7	3	0
(Argentina) C Berlocq	5	6	6
8	(Italy) F Fognini	6	3	3
WC	(Latvia) E Gulbis	3	6	6
(Belgium) O Rochus	2	6^{5}
(Uzbekistan) D Istomin	6	7
(India) S Devvarman	3	6^{7}
(France) A Mannarino	6	7

Second round
WC	(France) J Benneteau	3	4
(Spain) P Andújar	6	6
(Argentina) C Berlocq	7	4	3
3	(Spain) N Almagro	6^{5}	6	6
WC	(Latvia) E Gulbis	6	4	6
(Uzbekistan) D Istomin	3	6	3
(France) A Mannarino	1	4
2	(Czech Republic) T Berdych	6	6

Quarterfinals
(Spain) P Andújar	1	4
3	(Spain) N Almagro	6	6
WC	(Latvia) E Gulbis	1	4
2	(Czech Republic) T Berdych	6	6

Semifinals
3	(Spain) N Almagro	6	6
2	(Czech Republic) T Berdych	4	4
