= 2009 MercedesCup – Singles =

Singles
- 2009 MercedesCup

Final
- Champion: (France) Jérémy Chardy
- Runner-up: (Romania) Victor Hănescu
- Score: 1–6, 6–3, 6–4

Details
- Draw: 32
- Seeds: 8

Events
Singles	Doubles
- MercedesCup

Juan Martín del Potro was the defending champion, but chose not to participate that year.

Unseeded Jérémy Chardy won in the final 1–6, 6–3, 6–4 against Victor Hănescu.

== Seeds ==
1. (France) Gilles Simon (second round)
2. (Russia) Nikolay Davydenko (quarterfinals)
3. (Czech Republic) Tomáš Berdych (first round)
4. (Romania) Victor Hănescu (final)
5. (Germany) Philipp Kohlschreiber (second round)
6. (Spain) Albert Montañés (withdrew)
7. (France) Fabrice Santoro (first round)
8. (Argentina) José Acasuso (first round)

== Draw ==
Key

- Q = Qualifier
- WC = Wild card
- LL = Lucky loser
- Alt = Alternate
- ITF = ITF entry
- PR = Protected ranking
- SR = Special ranking
- SE = Special exempt
- JE = Junior exempt
- JR = Junior Accelerator Programme entrant
- CO = College Accelerator Programme entrant
- NG = Next Gen Accelerator Program entrant
- w/o = Walkover
- r = Retired
- d = Defaulted

=== Finals ===
Semifinals
(France) Jérémy Chardy	6	7
(Germany) Nicolas Kiefer	3	5
4	(Romania) Victor Hănescu	6	6^{4}	6
(Italy) Fabio Fognini	3	7	2

Final
(France) Jérémy Chardy	1	6	6
4	(Romania) Victor Hănescu	6	3	4

=== Top half ===
First round
1	(France) G Simon	6	6
(Germany) P Petzschner	3	4
(Germany) M Zverev	6	6
(Spain) G García-López	2	4
(Kazakhstan) A Golubev	6	3	0
(Argentina) M Vassallo Argüello	3	6	6
(France) J Chardy	6	7
8	(Argentina) J Acasuso	2	6^{4}
3	(Czech Republic) T Berdych	3	3
(Germany) N Kiefer	6	6
(Germany) A Beck	6^{4}	6^{5}
WC	(Germany) S Greul	7	7
Q	(Poland) Ł Kubot	6	6
Q	(Spain) P Andújar	2	4
(Argentina) D Junqueira	3	2
5	(Germany) P Kohlschreiber	6	6

Second round
1	(France) G Simon	3	2
(Germany) M Zverev	6	6
(Argentina) M Vassallo Argüello	6	3	1
(France) J Chardy	2	6	6
(Germany) N Kiefer	6	6
WC	(Germany) S Greul	3	4
Q	(Poland) Ł Kubot	6	6
5	(Germany) P Kohlschreiber	2	4

Quarterfinals
(Germany) M Zverev	6^{4}	1
(France) J Chardy	7	6
(Germany) N Kiefer	6	6
Q	(Poland) Ł Kubot	2	1

Semifinals
(France) J Chardy	6	7
(Germany) N Kiefer	3	5

=== Bottom half ===
First round
LL	(France) A Sidorenko	7	1	6
Q	(Spain) D Muñoz-De La Nava	6^{3}	6	2
(Serbia) J Tipsarević	4	4
(Spain) Ó Hernández	6	6
(Czech Republic) I Minář	6	6^{2}	4
(Germany) R Schüttler	2	7	6
Q	(Germany) D Meffert	4	6^{6}
4	(Romania) V Hănescu	6	7
7	(France) F Santoro	7	6^{3}	1
(Italy) F Fognini	5	7	6
(Russia) M Youzhny	6^{4}	6^{4}
(France) P-H Mathieu	7	7
WC	(Germany) M Berrer	0	7	7
WC	(Austria) S Koubek	6	6^{3}	6^{4}
(Spain) I Navarro	6	5	3
2	(Russia) N Davydenko	4	7	6

Second round
LL	(France) A Sidorenko	2	6	6
(Spain) Ó Hernández	6	4	3
(Germany) R Schüttler	2	1
4	(Romania) V Hănescu	6	6
(Italy) F Fognini	6	4
(France) P-H Mathieu	4	1	r
WC	(Germany) M Berrer	3	3
2	(Russia) N Davydenko	6	6

Quarterfinals
LL	(France) A Sidorenko	6^{2}	4
4	(Romania) V Hănescu	7	6
(Italy) F Fognini	6	3	7
2	(Russia) N Davydenko	1	6	5

Semifinals
4	(Romania) V Hănescu	6	6^{4}	6
(Italy) F Fognini	3	7	2
