= 2011 BNP Paribas Open – Men's singles =

Men's singles
- 2011 BNP Paribas Open

Final
- Champion: (Serbia) Novak Djokovic
- Runner-up: (Spain) Rafael Nadal
- Score: 4–6, 6–3, 6–2

Details
- Draw: 96
- Seeds: 32

Events
Singles	men	women
Doubles	men	women
- Indian Wells Masters

Novak Djokovic defeated Rafael Nadal in the final, 4–6, 6–3, 6–2 to win the men's singles tennis title at the 2011 Indian Wells Masters.

Ivan Ljubičić was the defending champion, but lost to Juan Martín del Potro in the second round.

== Seeds ==
All seeds received a bye into the second round.

1. (Spain) Rafael Nadal (final)
2. (Switzerland) Roger Federer (semifinals)
3. (Serbia) Novak Djokovic (champion)
4. (Sweden) Robin Söderling (third round)
5. (United Kingdom) Andy Murray (second round)
6. (Spain) David Ferrer (second round)
7. (Czech Republic) Tomáš Berdych (fourth round)
8. (United States) Andy Roddick (fourth round)
9. (Spain) Fernando Verdasco (third round)
10. (Austria) Jürgen Melzer (third round)
11. (Spain) Nicolás Almagro (third round)
12. (Switzerland) Stanislas Wawrinka (quarterfinals)
13. (United States) Mardy Fish (second round)
14. (Croatia) Ivan Ljubičić (second round)
15. (France) Jo-Wilfried Tsonga (second round)
16. (Serbia) Viktor Troicki (fourth round)
17. (Croatia) Marin Čilić (third round)
18. (France) Richard Gasquet (quarterfinals)
19. (Cyprus) Marcos Baghdatis (second round)
20. (Ukraine) Alexandr Dolgopolov (third round)
21. (United States) Sam Querrey (fourth round)
22. (Spain) Guillermo García López (second round)
23. (Spain) Albert Montañés (fourth round)
24. (France) Michaël Llodra (third round)
25. (Spain) Tommy Robredo (quarterfinals, withdrew due to a left abductor injury)
26. (Brazil) Thomaz Bellucci (third round)
27. (Argentina) Juan Mónaco (second round)
28. (France) Gilles Simon (third round)
29. (Argentina) Juan Ignacio Chela (third round)
30. (United States) John Isner (third round)
31. (Latvia) Ernests Gulbis (third round)
32. (Germany) Philipp Kohlschreiber (fourth round)

== Draw ==
Key

- Q = Qualifier
- WC = Wild card
- LL = Lucky loser
- Alt = Alternate
- ITF = ITF entry
- PR = Protected ranking
- SR = Special ranking
- SE = Special exempt
- JE = Junior exempt
- JR = Junior Accelerator Programme entrant
- CO = College Accelerator Programme entrant
- NG = Next Gen Accelerator Program entrant
- w/o = Walkover
- r = Retired
- d = Defaulted

=== Finals ===
Quarterfinals
1	(Spain) Rafael Nadal	5	6	7^{9}
(Croatia) Ivo Karlović	7	1	6^{7}
PR	(Argentina) Juan Martín del Potro	w/o
25	(Spain) Tommy Robredo
18	(France) Richard Gasquet	2	4
3	(Serbia) Novak Djokovic	6	6
12	(Switzerland) Stan Wawrinka	3	4
2	(Switzerland) Roger Federer	6	6

Semifinals
1	(Spain) Rafael Nadal	6	6
PR	(Argentina) Juan Martín del Potro	4	4
3	(Serbia) Novak Djokovic	6	3	6
2	(Switzerland) Roger Federer	3	6	2

Final
1	(Spain) Rafael Nadal	6	3	2
3	(Serbia) Novak Djokovic	4	6	6

=== Top half ===
==== Section 1 ====
First round
Q	(South Africa) R de Voest	6
(Spain) P Riba	4	r
Q	(United States) R Sweeting	6	6
(Spain) M Granollers	4	1
Q	(India) S Devvarman	6	6
(France) A Mannarino	2	3
Q	(Italy) F Cipolla	1	4
(Belgium) X Malisse	6	6

Second round
1	(Spain) R Nadal	6	6
Q	(South Africa) R de Voest	0	2
Q	(United States) R Sweeting	6	0	6
27	(Argentina) J Mónaco	1	6	1
19	(Cyprus) M Baghdatis	5	0
Q	(India) S Devvarman	7	6
(Belgium) X Malisse	7^{8}	7
15	(France) J-W Tsonga	6^{6}	5

Third round
1	(Spain) R Nadal	6	6
Q	(United States) R Sweeting	3	1
Q	(India) S Devvarman	6	3	7^{7}
(Belgium) X Malisse	1	6	6^{5}

Fourth round
1	(Spain) R Nadal	7	6
Q	(India) S Devvarman	5	4

==== Section 2 ====
First round
Q	(United States) M Russell	6^{4}	6	6
(South Africa) K Anderson	7^{7}	3	4
(Uzbekistan) D Istomin	6	5	5
(Finland) J Nieminen	2	7	7
(Germany) R Schüttler	7^{7}	7
(Netherlands) R Haase	6^{4}	5
Q	(Australia) M Matosevic	6^{2}	7^{7}	2
(Croatia) I Karlović	7^{7}	6^{3}	6

Second round
11	(Spain) N Almagro	6	6
Q	(United States) M Russell	4	4
(Finland) J Nieminen	6^{5}	6	6^{2}
23	(Spain) A Montañés	7^{7}	2	7^{7}
28	(France) G Simon	6	7^{7}
(Germany) R Schüttler	3	6^{5}
(Croatia) I Karlović	7^{7}	6
6	(Spain) D Ferrer	6^{3}	3

Third round
11	(Spain) N Almagro	6	2	4
23	(Spain) A Montañés	4	6	6
28	(France) G Simon	3	3
(Croatia) I Karlović	6	6

Fourth round
23	(Spain) A Montañés	6^{7}	2
(Croatia) I Karlović	7^{9}	6

==== Section 3 ====
First round
(Germany) B Phau	4	6	4
(Germany) M Berrer	6	4	6
Q	(United States) T Smyczek	2	6	6
(Ukraine) I Marchenko	6	3	2
(Romania) V Hănescu	4	7^{7}	6
(Italy) A Seppi	6	6^{5}	3
(Czech Republic) R Štěpánek	4	0
PR	(Argentina) JM del Potro	6	6

Second round
4	(Sweden) R Söderling	6	7^{7}
(Germany) M Berrer	3	6^{4}
Q	(United States) T Smyczek	6	2	6^{6}
32	(Germany) P Kohlschreiber	2	6	7^{8}
20	(Ukraine) A Dolgopolov	6	6
(Romania) V Hănescu	4	4
PR	(Argentina) JM del Potro	5	6	6
14	(Croatia) I Ljubičić	7	4	2

Third round
4	(Sweden) R Söderling	6^{8}	4
32	(Germany) P Kohlschreiber	7^{10}	6
20	(Ukraine) A Dolgopolov	6^{3}	3
PR	(Argentina) JM del Potro	7^{7}	6

Fourth round
32	(Germany) P Kohlschreiber	6^{3}	6^{7}
PR	(Argentina) JM del Potro	7^{7}	7^{9}

==== Section 4 ====
First round
WC	(Lithuania) R Berankis	1	6	6
Q	(United States) A Bogomolov Jr.	6	3	4
(Serbia) J Tipsarević	6	6
(Germany) T Kamke	2	0
(Germany) M Zverev	6	6
Q	(Australia) M Ebden	4	3
Q	(United States) D Young	2	6	6
(Italy) P Starace	6	3	3

Second round
9	(Spain) F Verdasco	7	2
WC	(Lithuania) R Berankis	5	0	r
(Serbia) J Tipsarević	4	4
21	(United States) S Querrey	6	6
25	(Spain) T Robredo	6	3	7
(Germany) M Zverev	3	6	5
Q	(United States) D Young	7^{7}	6
5	(United Kingdom) A Murray	6^{4}	3

Third round
9	(Spain) F Verdasco	5	4
21	(United States) S Querrey	7	6
25	(Spain) T Robredo	6	6
Q	(United States) D Young	0	4

Fourth round
21	(United States) S Querrey	1	3
25	(Spain) T Robredo	6	6

=== Bottom half ===
==== Section 5 ====
First round
WC	(United States) J Blake	3	6	6
Q	(Australia) C Guccione	6	3	2
(Spain) R Ramírez Hidalgo	4	3
(Brazil) R Mello	6	6
(Uruguay) P Cuevas	7	6
(Spain) P Andújar	5	3
(France) J Benneteau	6	6
(Spain) F López	4	4

Second round
8	(United States) A Roddick	6	7
WC	(United States) J Blake	3	5
(Brazil) R Mello	3	6^{2}
30	(United States) J Isner	6	7^{7}
18	(France) R Gasquet	7	6
(Uruguay) P Cuevas	5	3
(France) J Benneteau	6	1	4
10	(Austria) J Melzer	1	6	6

Third round
8	(United States) A Roddick	7	6
30	(United States) J Isner	5	2
18	(France) R Gasquet	6	6
10	(Austria) J Melzer	1	3

Fourth round
8	(United States) A Roddick	3	6^{5}
18	(France) R Gasquet	6	7^{7}

==== Section 6 ====
First round
Q	(India) R Bopanna	7^{7}	6^{1}	4
WC	(Australia) B Tomic	6^{5}	7^{7}	6
(Colombia) S Giraldo	6	6^{5}	6
(Spain) D Gimeno Traver	4	7^{7}	3
(Australia) L Hewitt	2	3
(Chinese Taipei) Y-h Lu	6	6
(Germany) F Mayer	2	1
(Kazakhstan) A Golubev	6	6

Second round
16	(Serbia) V Troicki	6	6
WC	(Australia) B Tomic	4	4
(Colombia) S Giraldo	6^{6}	4
24	(France) M Llodra	7^{8}	6
31	(Latvia) E Gulbis	6^{1}	7^{9}	6
(Chinese Taipei) Y-h Lu	7^{7}	6^{7}	1
(Kazakhstan) A Golubev	0	4
3	(Serbia) N Djokovic	6	6

Third round
16	(Serbia) V Troicki	6	6
24	(France) M Llodra	3	3
31	(Latvia) E Gulbis	0	1
3	(Serbia) N Djokovic	6	6

Fourth round
16	(Serbia) V Troicki	0	1
3	(Serbia) N Djokovic	6	6

==== Section 7 ====
First round
(Kazakhstan) M Kukushkin	6^{8}	4
(Poland) Ł Kubot	7^{10}	6
(Netherlands) T de Bakker	2	5
(Germany) B Becker	6	7
(Russia) T Gabashvili	4	7^{7}	6^{4}
(France) F Serra	6	6^{1}	7^{7}
(Russia) N Davydenko	5	6	6
(Italy) F Fognini	7	2	4

Second round
7	(Czech Republic) T Berdych	6	6
(Poland) Ł Kubot	4	1
(Germany) B Becker	3	6^{5}
26	(Brazil) T Bellucci	6	7^{7}
17	(Croatia) M Čilić	6	6
(France) F Serra	1	3
(Russia) N Davydenko	6	6^{5}	4
12	(Switzerland) S Wawrinka	3	7^{7}	6

Third round
7	(Czech Republic) T Berdych	6	6
26	(Brazil) T Bellucci	3	2
17	(Croatia) M Čilić	5	3
12	(Switzerland) S Wawrinka	7	6

Fourth round
7	(Czech Republic) T Berdych	6	4	4
12	(Switzerland) S Wawrinka	3	6	6

==== Section 8 ====
First round
WC	(Canada) M Raonic	6	7^{7}
(Turkey) M İlhan	2	6^{4}
WC	(United States) R Harrison	6^{5}	7^{7}	6
(France) J Chardy	7^{7}	6^{2}	3
(Germany) P Petzschner	6	7
(Germany) D Brown	4	5
(Russia) I Andreev	6	6^{2}	6
(Japan) K Nishikori	4	7^{7}	4

Second round
13	(United States) M Fish	5	4
WC	(Canada) M Raonic	7	6
WC	(United States) R Harrison	6	7^{7}
22	(Spain) G García López	3	6^{4}
29	(Argentina) JI Chela	4	7	6
(Germany) P Petzschner	6	5	2
(Russia) I Andreev	5	6^{4}
2	(Switzerland) R Federer	7	7^{7}

Third round
WC	(Canada) M Raonic	6^{1}	6	4
WC	(United States) R Harrison	7^{7}	4	6
29	(Argentina) JI Chela	0	2
2	(Switzerland) R Federer	6	6

Fourth round
WC	(United States) R Harrison	6^{4}	3
2	(Switzerland) R Federer	7^{7}	6
