= 2009 SA Tennis Open – Singles =

Singles
- 2009 SA Tennis Open

Final
- Champion: (France) Jo-Wilfried Tsonga
- Runner-up: (France) Jérémy Chardy
- Score: 6–4, 7–6^{(7–5)}

Details
- Draw: 32
- Seeds: 8

Events
Singles	Doubles
← 2008 ·	SA Tennis Open	· 2010 →

Jo-Wilfried Tsonga won the title, defeating Jérémy Chardy 6–4, 7–6^{(7–5)} in the final.

== Seeds ==
1. (France) Jo-Wilfried Tsonga (champion)
2. (Spain) David Ferrer (semifinals)
3. (Spain) Marcel Granollers (first round)
4. (Spain) Guillermo García López (quarterfinals)
5. (France) Jérémy Chardy (final)
6. (Spain) Iván Navarro (first round)
7. (Belgium) Kristof Vliegen (quarterfinals)
8. (Cyprus) Marcos Baghdatis (quarterfinals)

== Draw ==
=== Key ===
- Q = Qualifier
- WC = Wild card
- LL = Lucky loser
- Alt = Alternate
- ITF = ITF entry
- PR = Protected ranking
- SR = Special ranking
- SE = Special exempt
- JE = Junior exempt
- JR = Junior Accelerator Programme entrant
- CO = College Accelerator Programme entrant
- NG = Next Gen Accelerator Program entrant
- w/o = Walkover
- r = Retired
- d = Defaulted

=== Finals ===
Semifinals
1	(France) Jo-Wilfried Tsonga	6	6
(Portugal) Frederico Gil	3	4
5	(France) Jérémy Chardy	1	7^{11}	7^{7}
2	(Spain) David Ferrer	6	6^{9}	6^{4}

Final
1	(France) Jo-Wilfried Tsonga	6	7^{7}
5	(France) Jérémy Chardy	4	6^{5}

=== Top half ===
First round
1	(France) J-W Tsonga	6	6
(Brazil) T Alves	4	1
(Uzbekistan) D Istomin	4	6	7^{7}
(Spain) S Ventura	6	4	6^{3}
(South Africa) K Anderson	6^{4}	4
(Czech Republic) I Minář	7^{7}	6
Q	(United Kingdom) R Hutchins	6^{3}	4
7	(Belgium) K Vliegen	7^{7}	6
4	(Spain) G García López	6	6
(Germany) B Phau	4	3
(Argentina) S Roitman	2	4
(Argentina) L Mayer	6	6
(Portugal) F Gil	6	6
(Austria) D Köllerer	4	0
WC	(South Africa) R de Voest	6	6
6	(Spain) I Navarro	3	4

Second round
1	(France) J-W Tsonga	6	6
(Uzbekistan) D Istomin	1	4
(Czech Republic) I Minář	4	1
7	(Belgium) K Vliegen	6	6
4	(Spain) G García López	6	7
(Argentina) L Mayer	4	5
(Portugal) F Gil	4	7	6
WC	(South Africa) R de Voest	6	5	4

Quarterfinals
1	(France) J-W Tsonga	6	6
7	(Belgium) K Vliegen	4	1
4	(Spain) G García López	6^{6}	3
(Portugal) F Gil	7^{8}	6

Semifinals
1	(France) J-W Tsonga	6	6
(Portugal) F Gil	3	4

=== Bottom half ===
First round
5	(France) J Chardy	6	6
(Czech Republic) J Vaněk	0	4
(Italy) F Cipolla	5	6	4
Q	(Switzerland) M Chiudinelli	7	1	6
WC	(South Africa) I van der Merwe	7^{7}	7^{7}
(Germany) B Becker	6^{4}	6^{3}
Q	(France) S de Chaunac	7	7^{7}
3	(Spain) M Granollers	5	6^{3}
8	(Cyprus) M Baghdatis	6	6
Q	(South Africa) A Anderson	4	2
(Spain) R Ramírez Hidalgo	3	5
WC	(South Africa) R Klaasen	6	7
(Germany) S Greul	6	6
(Romania) V Crivoi	2	4
(Israel) D Sela	2	0
2	(Spain) D Ferrer	6	6

Second round
5	(France) J Chardy	6	6
Q	(Switzerland) M Chiudinelli	4	4
WC	(South Africa) I van der Merwe	7^{7}	5	6^{5}
Q	(France) S de Chaunac	6^{3}	7	7^{7}
8	(Cyprus) M Baghdatis	6	7
WC	(South Africa) R Klaasen	3	5
(Germany) S Greul	3	4
2	(Spain) D Ferrer	6	6

Quarterfinals
5	(France) J Chardy	7^{7}	6
Q	(France) S de Chaunac	6^{4}	3
8	(Cyprus) M Baghdatis	5	2
2	(Spain) D Ferrer	7	6

Semifinals
5	(France) J Chardy	1	7^{11}	7^{7}
2	(Spain) D Ferrer	6	6^{9}	6^{4}

== Qualifying ==
Every player received a bye into the second round, so the first round has been omitted.

=== Seeds ===
1. (France) Sébastien de Chaunac (qualified)
2. (United States) Nathan Thompson (second round)
3. (Ukraine) Denys Molchanov (qualifying competition)
4. (Switzerland) Marco Chiudinelli (qualified)
5. (South Africa) Wesley Moodie (second round, retired)
6. (South Africa) Benjamin Janse van Rensburg (second round)
7. (South Africa) Hendrik Coertzen (second round)
8. (Romania) Horia Tecău (qualifying competition)

=== Qualifiers ===
1. (France) Sébastien de Chaunac
2. (South Africa) Andrew Anderson
3. (United Kingdom) Ross Hutchins
4. (Switzerland) Marco Chiudinelli

=== Qualifying draw ===
==== First qualifier ====
Second round
1	(France) Sébastien de Chaunac	6	6^{4}	6
(South Africa) Grant Ive	3	7^{7}	3
(South Africa) Nicolaas Scholtz	2	6
5	(South Africa) Wesley Moodie	6	3^{r}

Qualifying competition
1	(France) Sébastien de Chaunac	6	6
(South Africa) Nicolaas Scholtz	2	3

==== Second qualifier ====
Second round
2	(United States) Nathan Thompson	4	3
WC	(South Africa) Fritz Wolmarans	6	6
(South Africa) Andrew Anderson	3	6	7^{7}
6	(South Africa) Benjamin Janse van Rensburg	6	3	6^{1}

Qualifying competition
WC	(South Africa) Fritz Wolmarans	4	6	6^{4}
(South Africa) Andrew Anderson	6	3	7^{7}

==== Third qualifier ====
Second round
3	(Ukraine) Denys Molchanov	6	7^{7}
(United States) Eric Butorac	2	6^{3}
(United Kingdom) Ross Hutchins	6	3	7^{7}
7	(South Africa) Hendrik Coertzen	4	6	6^{2}

Qualifying competition
3	(Ukraine) Denys Molchanov	5	1
(United Kingdom) Ross Hutchins	7	6

==== Fourth qualifier ====
First round
4	(Switzerland) Marco Chiudinelli	6	6
(South Africa) Jean Andersen	0	1
(Zimbabwe) Mbonisi Ndimande	2	2
8	(Romania) Horia Tecău	6	6

Qualifying competition
4	(Switzerland) Marco Chiudinelli	6	7^{7}
8	(Romania) Horia Tecău	3	6^{2}
