= 2013 Shanghai Rolex Masters – Singles =

Singles
- 2013 Shanghai Rolex Masters

Final
- Champion: (Serbia) Novak Djokovic
- Runner-up: (Argentina) Juan Martín del Potro
- Score: 6–1, 3–6, 7–6^{(7–3)}

Events
Singles	Doubles
- Shanghai Masters

Defending champion Novak Djokovic defeated Juan Martín del Potro in the final, 6–1, 3–6, 7–6^{(7–3)} to win the singles tennis title at the 2013 Shanghai Masters.

== Seeds ==
The top eight seeds receive a bye into the second round.

1. (Serbia) Novak Djokovic (champion)
2. (Spain) Rafael Nadal (semifinals)
3. (Spain) David Ferrer (third round)
4. (Czech Republic) Tomáš Berdych (third round)
5. (Switzerland) Roger Federer (third round)
6. (Argentina) Juan Martín del Potro (final)
7. (France) Jo-Wilfried Tsonga (semifinals)
8. (Switzerland) Stan Wawrinka (quarterfinals)
9. (France) Richard Gasquet (first round)
10. (Canada) Milos Raonic (third round)
11. (Germany) Tommy Haas (third round, withdrew because of back injury)
12. (Japan) Kei Nishikori (third round)
13. (France) Gilles Simon (first round)
14. (United States) John Isner (second round)
15. (Spain) Nicolás Almagro (quarterfinals)
16. (Spain) Tommy Robredo (second round, retired with a wrist injury)

== Draw ==
Key

- Q = Qualifier
- WC = Wild card
- LL = Lucky loser
- Alt = Alternate
- ITF = ITF entry
- PR = Protected ranking
- SR = Special ranking
- SE = Special exempt
- JE = Junior exempt
- JR = Junior Accelerator Programme entrant
- CO = College Accelerator Programme entrant
- NG = Next Gen Accelerator Program entrant
- w/o = Walkover
- r = Retired
- d = Defaulted

=== Finals ===
Quarterfinals
1	(Serbia) Novak Djokovic	6^{4}	6	6
(France) Gaël Monfils	7^{7}	2	4
(Germany) Florian Mayer	2	3
7	(France) Jo-Wilfried Tsonga	6	6
6	(Argentina) Juan Martín del Potro	6	6
15	(Spain) Nicolás Almagro	3	3
8	(Switzerland) Stan Wawrinka	6^{10}	1
2	(Spain) Rafael Nadal	7^{12}	6

Semifinals
1	(Serbia) Novak Djokovic	6	7
7	(France) Jo-Wilfried Tsonga	2	5
6	(Argentina) Juan Martín del Potro	6	6
2	(Spain) Rafael Nadal	2	4

Final
1	(Serbia) Novak Djokovic	6	3	7^{7}
6	(Argentina) Juan Martín del Potro	1	6	6^{3}

=== Top half ===
==== Section 1 ====
First round
(Spain) M Granollers	6	6
(Serbia) J Tipsarević	4	4
Q	(Italy) P Lorenzi	6	6^{5}	4
(Italy) F Fognini	4	7^{7}	6
(Spain) A Montañés	4	1
16	(Spain) T Robredo	6	6
9	(France) R Gasquet	3	4
(Canada) V Pospisil	6	6
Q	(Japan) T Ito	3	2
(France) G Monfils	6	6
WC	(Australia) L Hewitt	4	2
(Italy) A Seppi	6	6

Second round
1	(Serbia) N Djokovic	6	6
(Spain) M Granollers	2	0
(Italy) F Fognini	7^{7}	2
16	(Spain) T Robredo	6^{3}	1^{r}
(Canada) V Pospisil	5	6^{4}
(France) G Monfils	7	7^{7}
(Italy) A Seppi	4	3
5	(Switzerland) R Federer	6	6

Third round
1	(Serbia) N Djokovic	6	6
(Italy) F Fognini	3	3
(France) G Monfils	6	6^{5}	6
5	(Switzerland) R Federer	4	7^{7}	3

Quarterfinals
1	(Serbia) N Djokovic	6^{4}	6	6
(France) G Monfils	7^{7}	2	4

==== Section 2 ====
First round
(France) J Benneteau	3	6	3
(Czech Republic) L Rosol	6	1	6
WC	(China) D Wu	3	3
(Germany) F Mayer	6	6
(France) B Paire	6	6
13	(France) G Simon	4	3
12	(Japan) K Nishikori	6	6
(Bulgaria) G Dimitrov	3	4
(Austria) J Melzer	4	6	6
(Croatia) I Dodig	6	3	4
(Russia) M Youzhny	2^{r}
(Spain) P Andújar	5

Second round
3	(Spain) D Ferrer	6	6
(Czech Republic) L Rosol	3	4
(Germany) F Mayer	7^{7}	7
(France) B Paire	6^{1}	5
12	(Japan) K Nishikori	6	3	6
(Austria) J Melzer	4	6	1
(Spain) P Andújar	3	2
7	(France) J-W Tsonga	6	6

Third round
3	(Spain) D Ferrer	4	3
(Germany) F Mayer	6	6
12	(Japan) K Nishikori	6^{5}	0
7	(France) J-W Tsonga	7^{7}	6

Quarterfinals
(Germany) F Mayer	2	3
7	(France) J-W Tsonga	6	6

=== Bottom half ===
==== Section 3 ====
First round
(Germany) P Kohlschreiber	7	6
WC	(China) M Gong	5	2
Q	(Colombia) A Falla	6^{3}	5
(Germany) D Brands	7^{7}	7
(United States) S Querrey	4	4
11	(Germany) T Haas	6	6
15	(Spain) N Almagro	7^{7}	6
Q	(Japan) G Soeda	6^{5}	2
(France) J Chardy	7	6
(Australia) B Tomic	5	2
(Spain) F López	7^{7}	4	6
(Finland) J Nieminen	6^{2}	6	3

Second round
6	(Argentina) JM del Potro	3	6	7^{7}
(Germany) P Kohlschreiber	6	3	6^{4}
(Germany) D Brands	4	4
11	(Germany) T Haas	6	6
15	(Spain) N Almagro	6	6
(France) J Chardy	3	4
(Spain) F López	6^{5}	2
4	(Czech Republic) T Berdych	7^{7}	6

Third round
6	(Argentina) JM del Potro	w/o
11	(Germany) T Haas
15	(Spain) N Almagro	6^{6}	6	7^{7}
4	(Czech Republic) T Berdych	7^{8}	3	6^{4}

Quarterfinals
6	(Argentina) JM del Potro	6	6
15	(Spain) N Almagro	3	3

==== Section 4 ====
First round
(Romania) V Hănescu	6	6^{5}	6^{4}
(South Africa) K Anderson	4	7^{7}	7^{7}
WC	(China) Z Zhang	5	2
(Spain) F Verdasco	7	6
Q	(Poland) M Przysiężny	4	4
10	(Canada) M Raonic	6	6
14	(United States) J Isner	4	7	7
Q	(Colombia) S Giraldo	6	5	5
(Russia) D Tursunov	6	4	4
(Argentina) C Berlocq	4	6	6
(Ukraine) A Dolgopolov	6	6
Q	(United States) M Russell	1	3

Second round
8	(Switzerland) S Wawrinka	6	3	7^{8}
(South Africa) K Anderson	4	6	6^{6}
(Spain) F Verdasco	6^{1}	6	3
10	(Canada) M Raonic	7^{7}	3	6
14	(United States) J Isner	4	6^{4}
(Argentina) C Berlocq	6	7^{7}
(Ukraine) A Dolgopolov	3	2
2	(Spain) R Nadal	6	6

Third round
8	(Switzerland) S Wawrinka	7^{7}	6
10	(Canada) M Raonic	6^{2}	4
(Argentina) C Berlocq	1	6^{5}
2	(Spain) R Nadal	6	7^{7}

Quarterfinals
8	(Switzerland) S Wawrinka	6^{10}	1
2	(Spain) R Nadal	7^{12}	6

== Qualifying ==
=== Seeds ===
1. (Chinese Taipei) Lu Yen-hsun (qualifying competition)
2. (Australia) Marinko Matosevic (withdrew)
3. (Argentina) Federico Delbonis (qualifying competition)
4. (Spain) Roberto Bautista Agut (first round)
5. (Poland) Łukasz Kubot (qualifying competition)
6. (Germany) Benjamin Becker (first round)
7. (United States) Jack Sock (qualifying competition)
8. (Italy) Paolo Lorenzi (qualified)
9. (Colombia) Santiago Giraldo (qualified)
10. (Poland) Michał Przysiężny (qualified)
11. (India) Somdev Devvarman (qualifying competition)
12. (United States) Michael Russell (qualified)
13. (Colombia) Alejandro Falla (qualified)
14. (United States) Ryan Harrison (qualifying competition)

=== Qualifiers ===
1. (Colombia) Alejandro Falla
2. (Japan) Go Soeda
3. (Poland) Michał Przysiężny
4. (Italy) Paolo Lorenzi
5. (Colombia) Santiago Giraldo
6. (Japan) Tatsuma Ito
7. (United States) Michael Russell

=== Qualifying draw ===
==== First qualifier ====
First round
1	(Chinese Taipei) Lu Yen-hsun	6	6
(Japan) Shuichi Sekiguchi	0	1
(South Korea) Jun Woong-sun	5	6	2
13	(Colombia) Alejandro Falla	7	3	6

Qualifying competition
1	(Chinese Taipei) Lu Yen-hsun	4	3
13	(Colombia) Alejandro Falla	6	6

==== Second qualifier ====
First round
Alt	(China) Bai Yan	0	3
(Japan) Go Soeda	6	6
WC	(China) Cai Zhao	3	0
14	(United States) Ryan Harrison	6	6

Qualifying competition
(Japan) Go Soeda	7	6
14	(United States) Ryan Harrison	5	3

==== Third qualifier ====
First round
3	(Argentina) Federico Delbonis	6	6
(China) Li Zhe	3	4
WC	(China) Wang Aoran	1	2
10	(Poland) Michał Przysiężny	6	6

Qualifying competition
3	(Argentina) Federico Delbonis	6^{4}	4
10	(Poland) Michał Przysiężny	7^{7}	6

==== Fourth qualifier ====
First round
4	(Spain) Roberto Bautista Agut	6	2	6^{3}
(Australia) James Duckworth	3	6	7^{7}
(Japan) Yūichi Sugita	3	4
8	(Italy) Paolo Lorenzi	6	6

Qualifying competition
(Australia) James Duckworth	5	4
8	(Italy) Paolo Lorenzi	7	6

==== Fifth qualifier ====
First round
5	(Poland) Łukasz Kubot	6	6
WC	(China) Zhang Hao	2	3
(Japan) Hiroki Moriya	3	2
9	(Colombia) Santiago Giraldo	6	6

Qualifying competition
5	(Poland) Łukasz Kubot	5	6^{7}
9	(Colombia) Santiago Giraldo	7	7^{9}

==== Sixth qualifier ====
First round
6	(Germany) Benjamin Becker	5	6^{2}
(Japan) Tatsuma Ito	7	7^{7}
WC	(China) Liu Siyu	1	6	1
11	(India) Somdev Devvarman	6	4	6

Qualifying competition
(Japan) Tatsuma Ito	7^{8}	6
11	(India) Somdev Devvarman	6^{6}	0

==== Seventh qualifier ====
First round
7	(United States) Jack Sock	6	6
(Germany) Mischa Zverev	3	4
(Turkey) Marsel İlhan	4	4
12	(United States) Michael Russell	6	6

Qualifying competition
7	(United States) Jack Sock	3	7^{7}	6^{3}
12	(United States) Michael Russell	6	6^{4}	7^{7}
