= 2014 Sony Open Tennis – Men's singles =

Men's singles
- 2014 Sony Open Tennis

Final
- Champion: (Serbia) Novak Djokovic
- Runner-up: (Spain) Rafael Nadal
- Score: 6–3, 6–3

Details
- Draw: 96 (12Q / 5WC)
- Seeds: 32

Events
Singles	men	women
Doubles	men	women
← 2013 ·	Miami Masters	· 2015 →

Novak Djokovic defeated Rafael Nadal in the final, 6–3, 6–3 to win the men's singles tennis title at the 2014 Miami Open. He did not lose a single set in the entire tournament. Djokovic completed his second Sunshine Double with the win.

Andy Murray was the defending champion, but lost in the quarterfinals to Djokovic.

This was the first ATP Tour tournament of the Open Era where two semifinalists issued walkovers to their opponents, resulting in no matches in the semifinal round.

The first-round match between Jarkko Nieminen and Bernard Tomic lasted 28 minutes and 20 seconds, thus becoming the shortest recorded professional tennis match in Open Era history.

== Seeds ==
All seeds receive a bye into the second round.

1. (Spain) Rafael Nadal (final)
2. (Serbia) Novak Djokovic (champion)
3. (Switzerland) Stanislas Wawrinka (fourth round)
4. (Spain) David Ferrer (fourth round)
5. (Switzerland) Roger Federer (quarterfinals)
6. (United Kingdom) Andy Murray (quarterfinals)
7. (Czech Republic) Tomáš Berdych (semifinals, withdrew because of gastroenteritis)
8. (Argentina) ~~Juan Martín del Potro~~ (withdrew because of a wrist injury)
9. (France) Richard Gasquet (fourth round)
10. (United States) John Isner (fourth round)
11. (France) Jo-Wilfried Tsonga (fourth round)
12. (Canada) Milos Raonic (quarterfinals)
13. (Germany) ~~Tommy Haas~~ (withdrew because of a right shoulder injury)
14. (Italy) Fabio Fognini (fourth round)
15. (Bulgaria) Grigor Dimitrov (third round)
16. (Spain) Tommy Robredo (fourth round)

17. (South Africa) Kevin Anderson (third round)
18. (Spain) Nicolás Almagro (third round)
19. (Poland) Jerzy Janowicz (second round)
20. (Japan) Kei Nishikori (semifinals, withdrew because of a groin injury)
21. (Latvia) Ernests Gulbis (second round)
22. (Ukraine) Alexandr Dolgopolov (quarterfinals)
23. (France) Gaël Monfils (second round)
24. (Germany) Philipp Kohlschreiber (second round)
25. (Croatia) Marin Čilić (second round)
26. (France) Gilles Simon (second round)
27. (Canada) Vasek Pospisil (second round)
28. (Spain) Fernando Verdasco (second round)
29. (Russia) Dmitry Tursunov (second round)
30. (Germany) Florian Mayer (third round, withdrew because of a groin injury)
31. (Italy) Andreas Seppi (third round)
32. (Spain) Feliciano López (third round)

Click on the seed number of a player to go to their draw section.

== Draw ==
=== Key ===
- Q = Qualifier
- WC = Wild card
- LL = Lucky loser
- Alt = Alternate
- ITF = ITF entry
- PR = Protected ranking
- SR = Special ranking
- SE = Special exempt
- JE = Junior exempt
- JR = Junior Accelerator Programme entrant
- CO = College Accelerator Programme entrant
- NG = Next Gen Accelerator Program entrant
- w/o = Walkover
- r = Retired
- d = Defaulted

=== Finals ===
Quarterfinals
1	(Spain) Rafael Nadal	4	6	6
12	(Canada) Milos Raonic	6	2	4
22	(Ukraine) Alexandr Dolgopolov	4	6^{3}
7	(Czech Republic) Tomáš Berdych	6	7^{7}
5	(Switzerland) Roger Federer	6	5	4
20	(Japan) Kei Nishikori	3	7	6
6	(United Kingdom) Andy Murray	5	3
2	(Serbia) Novak Djokovic	7	6

Semifinals
1	(Spain) Rafael Nadal	w/o
7	(Czech Republic) Tomáš Berdych
20	(Japan) Kei Nishikori
2	(Serbia) Novak Djokovic	w/o

Final
1	(Spain) Rafael Nadal	3	3
2	(Serbia) Novak Djokovic	6	6

=== Top half ===
==== Section 1 ====
First round
(Netherlands) R Haase	6	3	3
(Australia) L Hewitt	3	6	6
(Uzbekistan) D Istomin	7^{10}	7^{7}
(France) N Mahut	6^{8}	6^{2}
(Spain) R Bautista Agut	4	6	6
Q	(United States) S Johnson	6	3	1
Q	(Slovakia) L Lacko	6	6
(France) K de Schepper	4	4

Second round
1	(Spain) R Nadal	6	6
(Australia) L Hewitt	1	3
(Uzbekistan) D Istomin	6^{8}	6	6
29	(Russia) D Tursunov	7^{10}	0	3
19	(Poland) J Janowicz	4	1
(Spain) R Bautista Agut	6	6
Q	(Slovakia) L Lacko	4	4
14	(Italy) F Fognini	6	6

Third round
1	(Spain) R Nadal	6	6
(Uzbekistan) D Istomin	1	0
(Spain) R Bautista Agut	6	3	3
14	(Italy) F Fognini	4	6	6

Fourth round
1	(Spain) R Nadal	6	6
14	(Italy) F Fognini	2	2

==== Section 2 ====
First round
WC	(Argentina) G Pella	3	4
Q	(United States) J Sock	6	6
(United States) B Klahn	6	1	4
(Spain) G García López	1	6	6
Q	(Slovenia) A Bedene	1	6	6
Q	(Chinese Taipei) J Wang	6	2	4
(Argentina) F Delbonis	2	4
WC	(United States) R Harrison	6	6

Second round
12	(Canada) M Raonic	6	7^{7}
Q	(United States) J Sock	4	6^{1}
(Spain) G García López	6	7
23	(France) G Monfils	2	5
27	(Canada) V Pospisil	7^{7}	5	3
Q	(Slovenia) A Bedene	6^{5}	7	6
WC	(United States) R Harrison	5	6	6^{2}
LL	(Germany) B Becker	7	3	7^{7}

Third round
12	(Canada) M Raonic	6	6
(Spain) G García López	1	2
Q	(Slovenia) A Bedene	3	5
LL	(Germany) B Becker	6	7

Fourth round
12	(Canada) M Raonic	6	6
LL	(Germany) B Becker	3	4

==== Section 3 ====
First round
(Spain) D Gimeno Traver	6^{8}	6	6
WC	(Russia) K Khachanov	7^{10}	1	1
(France) É Roger-Vasselin	3	6	7^{7}
(Netherlands) I Sijsling	6	3	6^{3}
(Australia) B Tomic	0	1
(Finland) J Nieminen	6	6
(Chinese Taipei) Y-h Lu	6	3
(Kazakhstan) M Kukushkin	1	1^{r}

Second round
3	(Switzerland) S Wawrinka	6	3	6
(Spain) D Gimeno Traver	0	6	3
(France) É Roger-Vasselin	6	7^{7}
25	(Croatia) M Čilić	2	6^{5}
22	(Ukraine) A Dolgopolov	6	6
(Finland) J Nieminen	4	2
(Chinese Taipei) Y-h Lu	1	7^{7}	3
LL	(Serbia) D Lajović	6	6^{3}	6

Third round
3	(Switzerland) S Wawrinka	7	6
(France) É Roger-Vasselin	5	4
22	(Ukraine) A Dolgopolov	3	6	7^{7}
LL	(Serbia) D Lajović	6	0	6^{5}

Fourth round
3	(Switzerland) S Wawrinka	4	6	1
22	(Ukraine) A Dolgopolov	6	3	6

==== Section 4 ====
First round
(Argentina) C Berlocq	2	2
(United States) D Young	6	6
(United States) S Querrey	7^{7}	6
(Ukraine) S Stakhovsky	6^{2}	3
(Spain) P Carreño Busta	4	6^{3}
(Portugal) J Sousa	6	7^{7}
Q	(Russia) A Bogomolov Jr.	5	4
(France) S Robert	7	6

Second round
10	(United States) J Isner	6^{5}	6	6
(United States) D Young	7^{7}	3	4
(United States) S Querrey	4	4
18	(Spain) N Almagro	6	6
26	(France) G Simon	6^{5}	6	3
(Portugal) J Sousa	7^{7}	3	6
(France) S Robert	6^{5}	1
7	(Czech Republic) T Berdych	7^{7}	6

Third round
10	(United States) J Isner	7	6
18	(Spain) N Almagro	5	3
(Portugal) J Sousa	2	4
7	(Czech Republic) T Berdych	6	6

Fourth round
10	(United States) J Isner	3	5
7	(Czech Republic) T Berdych	6	7

=== Bottom half ===
==== Section 5 ====
First round
Q	(France) P-H Mathieu	6^{3}	6^{5}
(Croatia) I Karlović	7^{7}	7^{7}
(Romania) V Hănescu	3	2
Q	(Netherlands) T de Bakker	6	6
(Argentina) H Zeballos	7	6
Q	(Belgium) D Goffin	5	3
(Colombia) A González	7^{11}	6
Q	(Tunisia) M Jaziri	6^{9}	1

Second round
5	(Switzerland) R Federer	6	7^{7}
(Croatia) I Karlović	4	6^{4}
Q	(Netherlands) T de Bakker	7^{7}	6^{3}	6
28	(Spain) F Verdasco	6^{4}	7^{7}	2
17	(South Africa) K Anderson	6	6
(Argentina) H Zeballos	4	3
(Colombia) A González	6^{7}	4
9	(France) R Gasquet	7^{9}	6

Third round
5	(Switzerland) R Federer	6	6
Q	(Netherlands) T de Bakker	3	3
17	(South Africa) K Anderson	3	4
9	(France) R Gasquet	6	6

Fourth round
5	(Switzerland) R Federer	6	6
9	(France) R Gasquet	1	2

==== Section 6 ====
First round
(Poland) M Przysiężny	7	6^{5}	3
(Spain) A Montañés	5	7^{7}	6
(Colombia) A Falla	6	4	6^{6}
(Australia) M Matosevic	1	6	7^{8}
(Germany) D Brands	3	0
(Czech Republic) R Štěpánek	6	6
(Spain) M Granollers	4	3
(Russia) T Gabashvili	6	6

Second round
15	(Bulgaria) G Dimitrov	6	6^{5}	6
(Spain) A Montañés	1	7^{7}	3
(Australia) M Matosevic	4	1
20	(Japan) K Nishikori	6	6
31	(Italy) A Seppi	7^{10}	4	6
(Czech Republic) R Štěpánek	6^{8}	6	4
(Russia) T Gabashvili	4	0
4	(Spain) D Ferrer	6	6

Third round
15	(Bulgaria) G Dimitrov	6^{1}	5
20	(Japan) K Nishikori	7^{7}	7
31	(Italy) A Seppi	3	2
4	(Spain) D Ferrer	6	6

Fourth round
20	(Japan) K Nishikori	7^{9}	2	7^{11}
4	(Spain) D Ferrer	6^{7}	6	6^{9}

==== Section 7 ====
First round
(Australia) M Ebden	4	6	6
(Poland) Ł Kubot	6	4	4
(Czech Republic) J Veselý	6	7^{7}
(Italy) F Volandri	4	6^{1}
(Colombia) S Giraldo	6	2	5
WC	(Cyprus) M Baghdatis	1	6	7
(France) A Mannarino	6	7
(Russia) N Davydenko	4	5

Second round
6	(United Kingdom) A Murray	3	6	6
(Australia) M Ebden	6	0	1
(Czech Republic) J Veselý	2	6^{3}
32	(Spain) F López	6	7^{7}
24	(Germany) P Kohlschreiber	6	6^{1}	6^{5}
WC	(Cyprus) M Baghdatis	3	7^{7}	7^{7}
(France) A Mannarino	2	4
11	(France) J-W Tsonga	6	6

Third round
6	(United Kingdom) A Murray	6	6
32	(Spain) F López	4	1
WC	(Cyprus) M Baghdatis	6	6^{6}	5
11	(France) J-W Tsonga	4	7^{8}	7

Fourth round
6	(United Kingdom) A Murray	6	6
11	(France) J-W Tsonga	4	1

==== Section 8 ====
First round
Q	(Austria) D Thiem	7^{8}	6
(Czech Republic) L Rosol	6^{6}	4
(France) J Benneteau	6^{2}	6	6
WC	(United Kingdom) K Edmund	7^{7}	3	2
Q	(Kazakhstan) A Golubev	6	1	4
(Croatia) I Dodig	4	6	6
(France) J Chardy	7	3	7^{7}
(Argentina) J Mónaco	5	6	6^{5}

Second round
16	(Spain) T Robredo	6	7^{10}
Q	(Austria) D Thiem	4	6^{8}
(France) J Benneteau	6	4	7
21	(Latvia) E Gulbis	4	6	5
30	(Germany) F Mayer	6	6
(Croatia) I Dodig	3	2
(France) J Chardy	4	3
2	(Serbia) N Djokovic	6	6

Third round
16	(Spain) T Robredo	6	6
(France) J Benneteau	3	4
30	(Germany) F Mayer
2	(Serbia) N Djokovic	w/o

Fourth round
16	(Spain) T Robredo	3	5
2	(Serbia) N Djokovic	6	7

== Qualifying ==
=== Seeds ===
1. (Kazakhstan) Andrey Golubev (qualified)
2. (India) Somdev Devvarman (first round)
3. (Kazakhstan) Aleksandr Nedovyesov (first round, retired)
4. (Brazil) Thomaz Bellucci (first round, retired)
5. (Germany) Benjamin Becker (qualifying competition, Lucky loser)
6. (Russia) Alex Bogomolov Jr. (qualified)
7. (Serbia) Dušan Lajović (qualifying competition, Lucky loser)
8. (Germany) Tobias Kamke (qualifying competition)
9. (Belgium) David Goffin (qualified)
10. (Dominican Republic) Víctor Estrella Burgos (qualifying competition)
11. (Italy) Paolo Lorenzi (first round)
12. (Austria) Dominic Thiem (qualified)
13. (United States) Jack Sock (qualified)
14. (Germany) Jan-Lennard Struff (qualifying competition)
15. (Slovakia) Lukáš Lacko (qualified)
16. (United States) Tim Smyczek (first round)
17. (United States) Denis Kudla (first round)
18. (United States) Michael Russell (first round)
19. (Germany) Peter Gojowczyk (first round)
20. (Germany) Julian Reister (first round)
21. (Netherlands) Jesse Huta Galung (first round)
22. (Russia) Evgeny Donskoy (qualifying competition)
23. (Slovenia) Aljaž Bedene (qualified)
24. (Tunisia) Malek Jaziri (qualified)

=== Qualifiers ===
1. (Kazakhstan) Andrey Golubev
2. (Netherlands) Thiemo de Bakker
3. (Chinese Taipei) Jimmy Wang
4. (France) Paul-Henri Mathieu
5. (Tunisia) Malek Jaziri
6. (Russia) Alex Bogomolov Jr.
7. (Slovakia) Lukáš Lacko
8. (Slovenia) Aljaž Bedene
9. (Belgium) David Goffin
10. (United States) Jack Sock
11. (United States) Steve Johnson
12. (Austria) Dominic Thiem

=== Lucky losers ===
1. (Germany) Benjamin Becker
2. (Serbia) Dušan Lajović

=== Key ===
- Q = Qualifier
- WC = Wild card
- LL = Lucky loser
- Alt = Alternate
- ITF = ITF entry
- PR = Protected ranking
- SR = Special ranking
- SE = Special exempt
- JE = Junior exempt
- JR = Junior Accelerator Programme entrant
- CO = College Accelerator Programme entrant
- NG = Next Gen Accelerator Program entrant
- w/o = Walkover
- r = Retired
- d = Defaulted

==== First qualifier ====
First round
1	(Kazakhstan) Andrey Golubev	6	7^{7}
(Romania) Marius Copil	4	6^{3}
(Bosnia and Herzegovina) Damir Džumhur	6	6
17	(United States) Denis Kudla	3	4

Qualifying competition
1	(Kazakhstan) Andrey Golubev	6	6
(Bosnia and Herzegovina) Damir Džumhur	4	2

==== Second qualifier ====
First round
2	(India) Somdev Devvarman	6^{4}	1
(Netherlands) Thiemo de Bakker	7^{7}	6
(Japan) Go Soeda	3	4
22	(Russia) Evgeny Donskoy	6	6

Qualifying competition
(Netherlands) Thiemo de Bakker	7^{7}	7^{7}
22	(Russia) Evgeny Donskoy	6^{4}	6^{5}

==== Third qualifier ====
First round
3	(Kazakhstan) Aleksandr Nedovyesov	1	3^{r}
(Chinese Taipei) Jimmy Wang	6	3
(United Kingdom) Daniel Evans	6	6
16	(United States) Tim Smyczek	4	2

Qualifying competition
(Chinese Taipei) Jimmy Wang	6	6
(United Kingdom) Daniel Evans	4	2

==== Fourth qualifier ====
First round
4	(Brazil) Thomaz Bellucci	6	3	2^{r}
(Belgium) Ruben Bemelmans	4	6	4
(France) Paul-Henri Mathieu	6	4	6
21	(Netherlands) Jesse Huta Galung	4	6	4

Qualifying competition
(Belgium) Ruben Bemelmans	3	7^{7}	1
(France) Paul-Henri Mathieu	6	6^{5}	6

==== Fifth qualifier ====
First round
5	(Germany) Benjamin Becker	6	6
(France) Pierre-Hugues Herbert	2	2
(Argentina) Diego Sebastián Schwartzman	2	6^{5}
24	(Tunisia) Malek Jaziri	6	7^{7}

Qualifying competition
5	(Germany) Benjamin Becker	6	3	2
24	(Tunisia) Malek Jaziri	3	6	6

==== Sixth qualifier ====
First round
6	(Russia) Alex Bogomolov Jr.	6	6
(Japan) Tatsuma Ito	2	1
WC	(Serbia) Filip Krajinović	6	6
20	(Germany) Julian Reister	4	3

Qualifying competition
6	(Russia) Alex Bogomolov Jr.	6	6
WC	(Serbia) Filip Krajinović	1	1

==== Seventh qualifier ====
First round
7	(Serbia) Dušan Lajović	6	6
(Lithuania) Ričardas Berankis	2	3
(Slovakia) Andrej Martin	3	2
15	(Slovakia) Lukáš Lacko	6	6

Qualifying competition
7	(Serbia) Dušan Lajović	3	2
15	(Slovakia) Lukáš Lacko	6	6

==== Eighth qualifier ====
First round
8	(Germany) Tobias Kamke	7^{7}	6
WC	(Japan) Taro Daniel	6^{4}	0
(United States) Wayne Odesnik	4	5
23	(Slovenia) Aljaž Bedene	6	7

Qualifying competition
8	(Germany) Tobias Kamke	3	6	4
23	(Slovenia) Aljaž Bedene	6	1	6

==== Ninth qualifier ====
First round
9	(Belgium) David Goffin	6	6
WC	(Sweden) Elias Ymer	4	1
Alt	(Ukraine) Illya Marchenko	6^{4}	3
14	(Germany) Jan-Lennard Struff	7^{7}	6

Qualifying competition
9	(Belgium) David Goffin	2	6	6
14	(Germany) Jan-Lennard Struff	6	4	1

==== Tenth qualifier ====
First round
10	(Dominican Republic) Víctor Estrella Burgos	6	6
WC	(United States) Deiton Baughman	1	3
WC	(Hungary) Márton Fucsovics	4	2
13	(United States) Jack Sock	6	6

Qualifying competition
10	(Dominican Republic) Víctor Estrella Burgos	3	4
13	(United States) Jack Sock	6	6

==== Eleventh qualifier ====
First round
11	(Italy) Paolo Lorenzi	4	1
(United States) Alex Kuznetsov	6	6
(United States) Steve Johnson	7^{7}	6
18	(United States) Michael Russell	6^{3}	4

Qualifying competition
(United States) Alex Kuznetsov	3	3
(United States) Steve Johnson	6	6

==== Twelfth qualifier ====
First round
12	(Austria) Dominic Thiem	7^{7}	6
(United States) Rhyne Williams	6^{1}	1
(Canada) Peter Polansky	0	6	7
19	(Germany) Peter Gojowczyk	6	2	5

Qualifying competition
12	(Austria) Dominic Thiem	6	7
(Canada) Peter Polansky	3	5
