= 2009 SA Tennis Open =

- Date: 2–8 February
- Edition: 1st
- Category: World Tour 250
- Draw: 32S / 16D
- Prize money: $442,500
- Surface: Hard / outdoors
- Location: Johannesburg, South Africa
- Venue: Montecasino

Champions

Singles
- (France) Jo-Wilfried Tsonga

Doubles
- (United States) James Cerretani / (Belgium) Dick Norman
- SA Tennis Open

The 2009 SA Tennis Open was a men's tennis tournament played on hard courts outdoors. It is the 1st edition of the SA Tennis Open, and was part of the ATP World Tour 250 series of the 2009 ATP World Tour. It took place at the Montecasino in Johannesburg, South Africa from 2 February through 8 February 2009.

The singles line up was led by Association of Tennis Professionals (ATP) No. 7 and 2008 Australian Open runner-up Jo-Wilfried Tsonga. Originally, Gaël Monfils was scheduled to play in the tournament, but later withdrew due to a wrist injury.

== Review ==
The singles competition was won by Frenchman Jo-Wilfried Tsonga who was the top seed for the tournament. On his route to the final he faced unseeded players Thiago Alves, Denis Istomin and Frederico Gil, as well as seventh seed Kristof Vliegen in the quarter-finals, winning them all in straight sets for the loss of only 22 games. His final opponent was his fellow countryman, the fifth-seeded Jérémy Chardy who had progressed against Jiří Vaněk, qualifiers Marco Chiudinelli and Sébastien de Chaunac in straight sets before a more tricky test against second seed David Ferrer. In the final Tsonga came through 7–6, 6–4 to take the title.

Five South African players (Kevin Anderson, Andrew Anderson, Izak van der Merwe, Raven Klaasen and Rik de Voest) were present in the draw and the latter three reached the second round. de Voest knocked out sixth seed Iván Navarro while Klaasen defeated another Spaniard, Rubén Ramírez Hidalgo and van der Merwe overcame Benjamin Becker.

== Finals ==
=== Singles ===
(France) Jo-Wilfried Tsonga defeated (France) Jérémy Chardy 6–4, 7–6^{(7–5)}

- It was Jo-Wilfried Tsonga's 1st title of the year and his 3rd overall.

=== Doubles ===
(United States) James Cerretani / (Belgium) Dick Norman defeated (South Africa) Rik de Voest / (Australia) Ashley Fisher 6–7^{(7–9)}, 6–2, [14–12]
