= 2011 Open de Nice Côte d'Azur – Doubles =

Doubles
- 2011 Open de Nice Côte d'Azur

Final
- Champions: (United States) Eric Butorac (Curaçao) Jean-Julien Rojer
- Runners-up: (Mexico) Santiago González (Spain) David Marrero
- Score: 6–3, 6–4

Events
Singles	Doubles
← 2010 ·	Open de Nice Côte d'Azur	· 2012 →

Marcelo Melo and Bruno Soares were the defending champions but were knocked out by Santiago González and David Marrero in the semifinals. They eventually lost to Eric Butorac and Jean-Julien Rojer in the final 3–6, 4–6.

== Seeds ==
1. (Brazil) Marcelo Melo / (Brazil) Bruno Soares (semifinals)
2. (United States) Eric Butorac / (Curaçao) Jean-Julien Rojer (champions)
3. (Czech Republic) František Čermák / (Slovakia) Filip Polášek (semifinals)
4. (Mexico) Santiago González / (Spain) David Marrero (final)

== Draw ==
=== Key ===
- Q = Qualifier
- WC = Wild card
- LL = Lucky loser
- Alt = Alternate
- SE = Special exempt
- PR = Protected ranking
- ITF = ITF entry
- JE = Junior exempt
- w/o = Walkover
- r = Retired
- d = Defaulted
- SR = Special ranking

=== Draw ===
First round
1	(Brazil) M Melo (Brazil) B Soares	6^{5}	6	[10]
(Uzbekistan) D Istomin (Netherlands) R Wassen	7	3	[5]
(Germany) D Brown (United States) T Rettenmaier	7	6
WC	(Brazil) T Fernandes (France) B Paire	5	4
4	(Mexico) S González (Spain) D Marrero	3	6	[10]
(Spain) P Andújar (Argentina) C Berlocq	6	3	[7]
(Italy) A Seppi (Slovakia) I Zelenay	6	5	[6]
(United States) S Lipsky (United States) R Ram	4	7	[10]
WC	(France) A Clément (France) A Mannarino	7	6
(Italy) D Bracciali (United Kingdom) C Fleming	5	4
(India) S Devvarman (United States) R Sweeting	2	2
3	(Czech Republic) F Čermák (Slovakia) F Polášek	6	6
(Brazil) F Ferreiro (Brazil) A Sá	6^{5}	4
(Israel) J Erlich (Australia) P Hanley	7	6
(United Kingdom) J Murray (Austria) A Peya	2	1
2	(United States) E Butorac (Curaçao) J-J Rojer	6	6

Quarterfinals
1	(Brazil) M Melo (Brazil) B Soares	6	3	[10]
(Germany) D Brown (United States) T Rettenmaier	3	6	[7]
4	(Mexico) S González (Spain) D Marrero	6	6
(United States) S Lipsky (United States) R Ram	4	4
WC	(France) A Clément (France) A Mannarino	6^{7}	1
3	(Czech Republic) F Čermák (Slovakia) F Polášek	7	6
(Israel) J Erlich (Australia) P Hanley	5	4
2	(United States) E Butorac (Curaçao) J-J Rojer	7	6

Semifinals
1	(Brazil) M Melo (Brazil) B Soares	7	4	[9]
4	(Mexico) S González (Spain) D Marrero	6^{2}	6	[11]
3	(Czech Republic) F Čermák (Slovakia) F Polášek	6^{3}	5
2	(United States) E Butorac (Curaçao) J-J Rojer	7	7

Final
4	(Mexico) S González (Spain) D Marrero	3	4
2	(United States) E Butorac (Curaçao) J-J Rojer	6	6
