= 2011 Open de Nice Côte d'Azur =

- Date: 16–21 May
- Edition: 27th
- Category: ATP World Tour 250 series
- Draw: 28S / 16D
- Prize money: €398,250
- Surface: Clay / outdoor
- Location: Nice, France
- Venue: Nice Lawn Tennis Club

Champions

Singles
- (Spain) Nicolás Almagro

Doubles
- (United States) Eric Butorac / (Curaçao) Jean-Julien Rojer
- Open de Nice Côte d'Azur

The 2011 Open de Nice Côte d'Azur was a men's tennis tournament play on outdoor clay courts. It was the 27th edition of the Open de Nice Côte d'Azur and was part of the ATP World Tour 250 series of the 2011 ATP World Tour. It took place at the Nice Lawn Tennis Club in Nice, France, from 16 May through 21 May 2011. Third-seeded Nicolás Almagro won the singles title.

== Finals ==
=== Singles ===
(Spain) Nicolás Almagro defeated (Romania) Victor Hănescu, 6–7^{(5–7)}, 6–3, 6–3

It was the 10th ATP Tournament won by Nicolás Almagro in his career.

=== Doubles ===
(United States) Eric Butorac / (Curaçao) Jean-Julien Rojer defeated (Mexico) Santiago González / (Spain) David Marrero, 6–3, 6–4

== Entrants ==
=== Seeds ===
Country	Player	Rank^{1}	Seed
ESP	David Ferrer	6	1
CZE	Tomáš Berdych	7	2
ESP	Nicolás Almagro	10	3
USA	Andy Roddick	12	4
UKR	Alexandr Dolgopolov	20	5
CYP	Marcos Baghdatis	27	6
UKR	Sergiy Stakhovsky	36	7
ITA	Fabio Fognini	48	8

- Seedings as of May 9, 2011.

=== Other entrants ===
The following players received wildcards into the main draw:

- (France) Julien Benneteau
- (Latvia) Ernests Gulbis
- (France) Édouard Roger-Vasselin

The following players received entry from the qualifying draw:

- (Austria) Andreas Haider-Maurer
- (France) Benoît Paire
- (Spain) Pere Riba
- (France) Guillaume Rufin

The following players received entry from a lucky loser spot:

- (Netherlands) Robin Haase
- (United States) Michael Russell

=== Withdrawals ===
- (United States) Andy Roddick (right shoulder injury)
- (Uruguay) Pablo Cuevas (leg injury)
