= Victor Hănescu =

Romanian tennis player

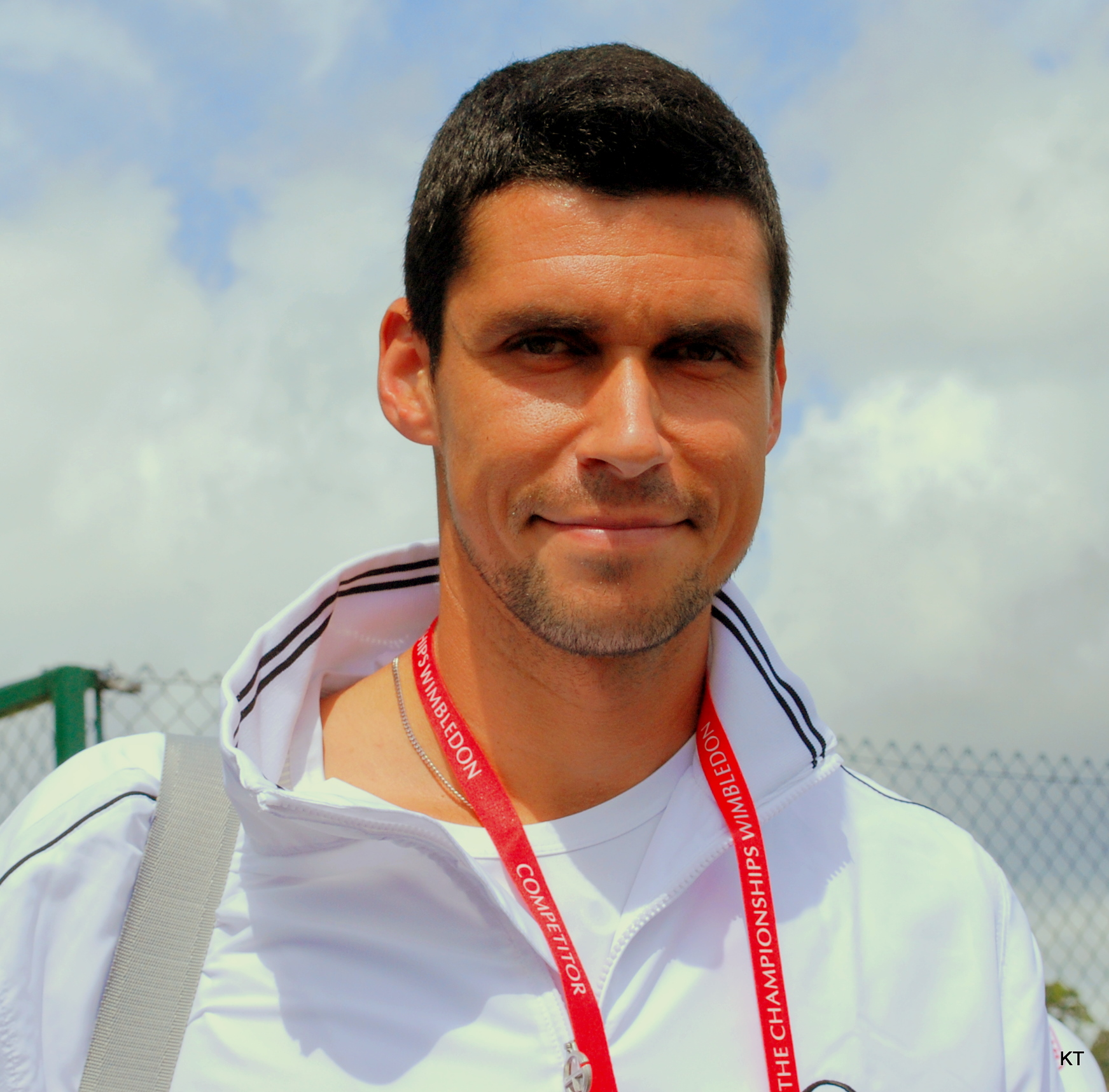
- Country (sports): Romania
- Residence: Bucharest, Romania
- Born: 21 July 1981 (age 45) Bucharest, Romania
- Height: 1.98 m (6 ft 6 in)
- Turned pro: 2000
- Retired: 2016
- Plays: Right-handed (one-handed backhand)
- Prize money: $4,330,340

Singles
- Career record: 201–244
- Career titles: 1
- Highest ranking: No. 26 (6 July 2009)

Grand Slam singles results
- Australian Open: 2R (2005, 2009, 2010, 2014)
- French Open: QF (2005)
- Wimbledon: 3R (2003, 2009, 2010)
- US Open: 2R (2008, 2010)

Other tournaments
- Olympic Games: 2R (2008)

Doubles
- Career record: 43–72
- Career titles: 2
- Highest ranking: No. 92 (30 January 2012)

Grand Slam doubles results
- Australian Open: 2R (2012, 2013)
- French Open: 2R (2012)
- Wimbledon: 2R (2005, 2008, 2009)
- US Open: 2R (2005, 2010)
- Last updated on: 22 March 2023.

Victor Hănescu (born 21 July 1981) is a Romanian former professional tennis player. His career-high singles ranking was world no. 26.

== Professional career ==
Hănescu attained a career-high singles ranking of No. 26 on 6 July 2009. In a Davis Cup match against the United States, he suffered a severe rib injury, and a subsequent injury sidelined him further in May 2006. By January 2007, his ranking had plummeted to No. 759, before he finally began making progress on a comeback.

=== 1999: Pro career begins ===
Hănescu earned his first ATP singles ranking points in August 1999, with first-round wins two weeks in a row at the Romania F1 and F2 Futures tournaments. Although he played four more tournaments from September through December, he did not earn any additional points and finished the year ranked No. 1231.

=== 2000: Success in Satellites and Futures ===
In 2000, Hănescu played Satellites and Futures tournaments. His fourth-place finish at a Satellite in Croatia in April/May and third place at a Satellite in Portugal in October/November provided him with 36 of the 45 ATP singles ranking points he earned in 2000. He finished the year ranked No. 477.

=== 2001: Futures wins and Challenger successes ===
Hănescu won his first pro tournaments in May 2001, taking the singles titles in consecutive weeks at the Slovakia F1 and F2 Futures events. A quarterfinal finish at a Challenger in Budapest two weeks later put him in the top 400 for the first time. In July, as the top seed in consecutive weeks in Bucharest, he reached the final at Romania F1 and won the F2 Futures event to improve his ranking to No. 319. In August in Challengers in three consecutive weeks, he reached the semifinals in Poland and Germany, and then the final in Germany to improve to No. 209. He broke into the top 200 for the first time in October, but went just 4–7 in Challengers after August and finished the year ranked No. 212.

=== 2002: First ATP quarterfinal, first Challenger win ===
Hănescu did not make much career progress in 2002. His highlights were reaching his first career ATP-level quarterfinal at Umag, Croatia in July, and then winning his first Challenger in Portugal in September. He finished the year ranked No. 172.

=== 2003: Top 100, French Open and Wimbledon third rounds ===
Moderate success in Challengers improved Hănescu's ranking to No. 150 by April 2003. He then qualified for the ATP tournament in Estoril and reached the third round of the Rome Masters in May and beat No. 31 Mikhail Youzhny, his highest-ranked win to that point. At the end of May, he qualified for the French Open and reached the third round, losing to Jarkko Nieminen, to break into the top 100 for the first time. He was a lucky loser entry at Wimbledon and reached the third round there also, beating No. 34 Juan Ignacio Chela before losing to No. 12 Sjeng Schalken, improving his ranking to No. 85. He had limited success the rest of the year, losing in the first round at the US Open to No. 6 Lleyton Hewitt, before reaching the quarterfinals in Bucharest in September. In October, he qualified for his second Masters' event of the year in Paris, upsetting No. 49 Rafael Nadal and No. 69 Anthony Dupuis, and then upsetting No. 27 Wayne Ferreira in the first round, before losing to No. 2 Andy Roddick. He finished the year ranked No. 70.

=== 2004: Grand Slam failures, first ATP semifinal, first top-10 win ===
Hănescu played almost exclusively at the ATP level in 2004, but with very limited success. He was ranked high enough for direct entry into all four Grand Slams and the Olympics but won only one match total in those five events. His successes were his first career ATP semifinal in Scottsdale in March, and several more ATP quarterfinals, including Bucharest again in September and Estoril in April, where he recorded his first win over a top-10 player, No. 6 Rainer Schüttler. In October, he went back down to the Challenger level and won in Rome, his second career Challenger title. He finished the year ranked No. 92, down 22 spots from 2003.

=== 2005: Best year, French Open quarterfinals, ATP semifinals ===
2005 was Hănescu's best year to date. At the French Open, he beat Michal Tabara in the first round then No. 32 Juan Ignacio Chela in the second round, and then Luis Horna in the third round before he came back to beat No. 11 David Nalbandian in five sets 6–3, 4–6, 5–7, 6–1, 6–2, in the fourth round. He lost to No. 1 Roger Federer in the quarterfinals. He reached the ATP semifinals in New Haven (beating No. 58 Nicolás Massú and No. 20 Tommy Robredo, before losing to No. 67 James Blake) and in Bucharest to reach the top 40 for the first time in September. He also had his second career win over a top-10 player, beating No. 10 Mariano Puerta in July, and finished the year with a career-high ranking of No. 35.

=== 2006: Lost to injuries ===
The rib injury in the Davis Cup match and a subsequent back injury in May sidelined him for most of the year, and after starting the year out at No. 35, he finished up at No. 646. His lone success was winning the ATP-level exhibition tournament in Houston in April, beating Vince Spadea and Juan Mónaco.

=== 2007: A comeback year, first ATP final ===
His ranking continued to plummet due mainly to inactivity, as well as poor results when he did play, until March, when he qualified for a Challenger event in Italy and beat No. 126 Björn Phau to reach the second round. His protected ranking status gave him direct entry into a couple ATP events in April, with little success. So he continued to play Challengers, reaching a semifinal and a quarterfinal in May, and then a final in June to get back into the top 300. Finally, in August, he won two consecutive Challengers in Romania and Austria to improve to No. 151 by the start of his home ATP stop in Bucharest in September, where he was a semifinalist in 2005; he went one step further this time by making the finals, losing in three sets to Gilles Simon. It was his first career final.

In December, the ATP entered Hănescu into the 2007 Centuries Club for advancing hundreds of spaces to regain a spot in the top 100 rankings. Hănescu climbed more ranking positions than any other player in the top 100. He finished the year at No. 77.

=== 2008 ===
Hănescu reached the fourth round of the French Open, where he lost to Fernando González 2–6, 4–6, 2–6. He reached the final of the Stuttgart Outdoor in July, only to lose to Jérémy Chardy 6–2, 3–6, 4–6. He reached the quarterfinals in St. Petersburg, losing to Igor Kunitsyn 3–6, 6–3, 6–7. He finished at No. 50.

=== 2009: Wimbledon third round ===
Hănescu started off the year by reaching the quarterfinals in Doha, where he lost to Andy Roddick. In Auckland, Hănescu lost in the first round to Juan Mónaco. He reached the second round of the Australian Open, after defeating Jan Hernych, but then fell to Dudi Sela. Hănescu reached the second round in Zagreb. In Dubai, he lost his first-round match. In Miami, he lost to Michael Russell in the first round. Hănescu reached the quarterfinals in Casablanca. He competed at the 2009 French Open. In the first round, he eliminated Steve Darcis 7–6, 7–6, 7–6, in the second round Mikhail Youzhny 7–5, 7–5, 7–5, and in the third round he upset seventh seed Gilles Simon 6–4, 6–4, 6–2. He next played Fernando González and lost 2–6, 4–6, 2–6.

At Wimbledon, he was seeded 31st. In the first round, he won a grueling match against Iván Navarro 6–3, 6–7, 6–4, 6–7, 12–10. Then he played Nicolas Devilder and won 6–2, 6–3, 6–1, to advance in the third round, where he lost to eighth-seeded Gilles Simon 2–6, 5–7, 2–6. At the 2009 MercedesCup, he reached the final by defeating Dominik Meffert, Rainer Schüttler, Alexandre Sidorenko, and Fabio Fognini in the semifinals. He lost in the final to Jérémy Chardy 6–1, 3–6, 4–6.

=== 2010 : Consecutive Wimbledon third round ===
At the 2010 Australian Open, he won his first-round match against Juan Ignacio Chela 6–4, 6–3, 7–6, but then lost in the second round to World No. 1 Roger Federer 2–6, 3–6, 2–6.

He then played at the 2010 BNP Paribas Open, where he won his first-round match against Juan Ignacio Chela 6–3, 7–6, and then lost again to Roger Federer 3–6, 7–6, 1–6.

At the 2010 Internazionali BNL d'Italia, he defeated Michael Berrer 6–2, 6–7, 6–3, in the first round, then Juan Mónaco 7–6, 6–4, to lose in the next round to eventual winner Rafael Nadal 3–6, 2–6.

In Casablanca, Morocco, on April 5, 2010 he was runner-up, losing in the final to Stanislas Wawrinka.

=== 2011: Fifth ATP final ===
Hănescu reached the semifinals in Casablanca, losing there to Potito Starace, 1–6, 7–6, 6–7. He reached the final in Nice, where he lost to Nicolás Almagro, 6–7, 3–6, 3–6. He went out in the second round at the French Open and Wimbledon and had little success for the rest of the year.

In July, he broke an 11-match losing streak to beat then-world No. 7 and top seed Gaël Monfils at the MercedesCup, after saving two match points in the second-set tiebreaker.

=== 2012 ===
Hănescu was defeated in the second round in Chennai by Canadian Milos Raonic, 1–6, 4–6. He also went out in the second round in São Paulo to Nicolás Almagro, who had beaten him in the final in Nice the previous year. He was defeated in the second round in Buenos Aires by upcoming Japanese star Kei Nishikori in three sets.

He reached the semifinals of the Challenger in Marrakech, going down against Slovak Martin Kližan, 5–7, 4–6. He reached the quarterfinals in Barletta, losing to Potito Starace, 5–7, 2–6.

He qualified in Monte Carlo and Madrid but went out in the first round. He failed to qualify in Rome.

== Controversy ==
At the 2010 Wimbledon Championships, Hănescu was booed and taunted by a group of spectators during his third-round loss to Daniel Brands of Germany. The group allegedly called him a gypsy, a highly derogatory term in Romania. Frustrated due to the injury and crowd behavior, he responded by spitting toward some spectators and received a warning from the umpire. He then deliberately made four service foot faults to lose two points, giving Brands a 3–0 lead in the final set, before retiring. Four spectators were later arrested by police under Section 5 of the Public Order Act. Hănescu was fined US$15,000 for his behavior, the first of its kind in his career.

== ATP career finals ==
=== Singles: 5 (1 title, 4 runners-up) ===
Legend Grand Slam tournaments (0–0) ATP World Tour Finals (0–0) ATP World Tour Masters 1000 (0–0) ATP World Tour 500 Series (0–0) ATP World Tour 250 Series (1–4)	Titles by surface Hard (0–0) Clay (1–4) Grass (0–0) Carpet (0–0)

Outcome	W–L	Date	Tournament	Surface	Opponent	Score
Runner-up	0–1	16 September 2007	BCR Open Romania, Bucharest, Romania	Clay	(France) Gilles Simon	6–4, 3–6, 2–6
Winner	1–1	13 July 2008	Allianz Suisse Open Gstaad, Gstaad, Switzerland	Clay	(Russia) Igor Andreev	6–3, 6–4
Runner-up	1–2	12 July 2009	MercedesCup, Stuttgart, Germany	Clay	(France) Jérémy Chardy	6–1, 3–6, 4–6
Runner-up	1–3	11 April 2010	Grand Prix Hassan II, Casablanca, Morocco	Clay	(Switzerland) Stanislas Wawrinka	2–6, 3–6
Runner-up	1–4	21 May 2011	Open de Nice Côte d'Azur, Nice, France	Clay	(Spain) Nicolás Almagro	7–6^{(7–5)}, 3–6, 3–6

=== Doubles: 4 (2 titles, 2 runners-up) ===
Legend Grand Slam tournaments (0–0) ATP World Tour Finals (0–0) ATP World Tour Masters 1000 (0–0) ATP World Tour 500 Series (2–0) ATP World Tour 250 Series (0–2)	Titles by surface Hard (0–0) Clay (2–2) Grass (0–0) Carpet (0–0)

Outcome	W–L	Date	Tournament	Surface	Partner	Opponents	Score
Runner-up	0–1	18 September 2005	BCR Open Romania, Bucharest, Romania	Clay	(Romania) Andrei Pavel	(Argentina) José Acasuso (Argentina) Sebastián Prieto	3–6, 6–4, 3–6
Winner	1–1	14 July 2008	Austrian Open, Kitzbühel, Austria	Clay	(United States) James Cerretani	(Argentina) Lucas Arnold Ker (Belgium) Olivier Rochus	6–3, 7–5
Runner-up	1–2	13 July 2009	MercedesCup, Stuttgart, Germany	Clay	(Romania) Horia Tecău	(Czech Republic) František Čermák (Slovakia) Michal Mertiňák	5–7, 4–6
Winner	2–2	26 February 2011	Abierto Mexicano Telcel, Acapulco, Mexico	Clay	(Romania) Horia Tecău	(Brazil) Marcelo Melo (Brazil) Bruno Soares	6–1, 6–3

== ATP Challenger and ITF Futures finals ==
=== Singles: 21 (11–10) ===
Legend ATP Challenger (8–8) ITF Futures (3–2)	Finals by surface Hard (0–1) Clay (11–9) Grass (0–0) Carpet (0–0)

Result	W–L	Date	Tournament	Tier	Surface	Opponent	Score
Win	1–0	May 2001	Slovakia F1, Levice	Futures	Clay	(Croatia) Ivan Beros	6–4, 4–6, 6–1
Win	2–0	May 2001	Slovakia F2, Prievidza	Futures	Clay	(Czech Republic) Petr Luxa	6–2, 6–1
Loss	2–1	Jul 2001	Romania F1, Bucharest	Futures	Clay	(Greece) Konstantinos Economidis	7–6^{(7–2)}, 2–6, 1–6
Win	3–1	Jul 2001	Romania F2, Bucharest	Futures	Clay	(Romania) Artemon Apostu-Efremov	7–6^{(7–2)}, 6–4
Loss	3–2	Sep 2001	Freudenstadt, Germany	Challenger	Clay	(Spain) Albert Montañés	0–6, 3–6
Win	4–2	Sep 2002	Maia, Portugal	Challenger	Clay	(Spain) Óscar Hernández	6–1, 3–6, 6–3
Loss	4–3	May 2003	Rome, Italy	Challenger	Clay	(Italy) Giorgio Galimberti	2–6, 4–6
Win	5–3	Oct 2004	Rome, Italy	Challenger	Clay	(Italy) Francesco Aldi	7–6^{(7–4)}, 6–2
Loss	5–4	Jun 2007	Milan, Italy	Challenger	Clay	(Spain) Santiago Ventura	3–6, 5–7
Win	6–4	Aug 2007	Timișoara, Romania	Challenger	Clay	(Spain) Santiago Ventura	7–6^{(7–2)}, 6–3
Win	7–4	Aug 2007	Graz, Austria	Challenger	Clay	(Argentina) Leonardo Mayer	7–6^{(7–4)}, 6–2
Win	8–4	Sep 2007	Bucharest, Romania	Challenger	Clay	(Spain) Marcel Granollers	7–6^{(8–6)}, 6–1
Loss	8–5	Nov 2008	Dnipropetrovsk, Ukraine	Challenger	Hard	(France) Fabrice Santoro	2–6, 3–6
Loss	8–6	Jul 2012	Arad, Romania	Challenger	Clay	(Argentina) Facundo Bagnis	4–6, 4–6
Win	9–6	Jul 2012	Timișoara, Romania	Challenger	Clay	(France) Guillaume Rufin	6–0, 6–3
Loss	9–7	Jul 2012	Bercuit, Belgium	Challenger	Clay	(Netherlands) Thiemo de Bakker	4–6, 6–3, 5–7
Loss	9–8	Aug 2012	Sibiu, Romania	Challenger	Clay	(Romania) Adrian Ungur	4–6, 6–7^{(1–7)}
Win	10–8	Sep 2012	Banja Luka, Bosnia & Herzegovina	Challenger	Clay	(Austria) Andreas Haider-Maurer	6–4, 6–1
Win	11–8	Sep 2012	Szczecin, Poland	Challenger	Clay	(Spain) Íñigo Cervantes	6–4, 7–5
Loss	11–9	Sep 2015	Banja Luka, Bosnia & Herzegovina	Challenger	Clay	(Serbia) Dušan Lajović	6–7^{(5–7)}, 6–7^{(5–7)}
Loss	11–10	Feb 2016	USA F7, Plantation	Futures	Clay	(Chile) Juan Carlos Sáez	3–6, 6–2, 6–7^{(5–7)}

=== Doubles: 5 (4–1) ===
Legend ATP Challenger (2–1) ITF Futures (2–0)	Finals by surface Hard (0–0) Clay (4–1) Grass (0–0) Carpet (0–0)

Result	W–L	Date	Tournament	Tier	Surface	Partner	Opponents	Score
Win	1–0	May 2001	Slovakia F2, Prievidza	Futures	Clay	(Slovakia) Viktor Bruthans	(Poland) Mariusz Fyrstenberg (Spain) Didac Perez-Minarro	2–6, 6–2, 6–0
Win	2–0	Jul 2001	Romania F2, Bucharest	Futures	Clay	(Romania) Victor Ioniță	(Romania) Marius Calugaru (Germany) Mark Eberling	6–4, 6–1
Win	3–0	Jun 2002	Turin, Italy	Challenger	Clay	(Spain) Óscar Hernández	(Russia) Denis Golovanov (Uzbekistan) Vadim Kutsenko	6–4, 6–3
Win	4–0	Aug 2002	Geneva, Switzerland	Challenger	Clay	(Argentina) Leonardo Olguín	(Argentina) Andrés Schneiter (Bulgaria) Orlin Stanoytchev	1–6, 6–4, 6–4
Loss	4–1	Sep 2015	Alphen, Netherlands	Challenger	Clay	(Romania) Adrian Ungur	(Germany) Tobias Kamke (Germany) Jan-Lennard Struff	6–7^{(1–7)}, 6–3, [7–10]

== Performance timelines ==
Key
W	F	SF	QF	#R	RR	Q#	DNQ	A	NH

(W) winner; (F) finalist; (SF) semifinalist; (QF) quarterfinalist; (#R) rounds 4, 3, 2, 1; (RR) round-robin stage; (Q#) qualification round; (DNQ) did not qualify; (A) absent; (NH) not held; (SR) strike rate (events won / competed); (W–L) win–loss record.

=== Singles ===
Current through 2015 Wimbledon Championships.

Tournament	2002	2003	2004	2005	2006	2007	2008	2009	2010	2011	2012	2013	2014	2015	W–L
Grand Slam tournaments
Australian Open	A	A	1R	2R	1R	1R	1R	2R	2R	1R	1R	1R	2R	A	4–11
French Open	Q1	3R	2R	QF	A	1R	2R	4R	3R	2R	1R	3R	1R	Q2	16–11
Wimbledon	A	3R	1R	2R	A	A	2R	3R	3R	2R	A	1R	1R	Q1	9–9
US Open	A	1R	1R	1R	A	A	2R	1R	2R	1R	A	1R	A		2–8
Win–loss	0–0	4–3	1–4	6–4	0–1	0–2	3–4	6–4	6–4	2–4	0–2	2–4	1–3	0–0	31–39
ATP World Tour Masters 1000
Indian Wells	A	A	2R	1R	A	A	2R	1R	2R	2R	A	1R	2R	2R	6–9
Miami	A	A	1R	2R	1R	A	1R	1R	1R	1R	A	2R	1R	Q1	2–9
Monte Carlo	A	A	A	3R	1R	A	A	2R	1R	1R	1R	1R	A	A	3–7
Rome	A	2R	A	2R	1R	Q1	Q1	1R	3R	1R	Q2	A	A	A	4–6
Madrid	A	A	A	2R	A	A	2R	1R	3R	1R	1R	A	A	A	4–6
Canada	A	A	A	A	A	A	A	3R	3R	A	A	A	A		4–2
Cincinnati	A	A	A	A	A	A	A	1R	1R	A	A	A	A		0–2
Shanghai	Not Masters Series							1R	A	A	A	1R	A		0–2
Paris	A	2R	2R	1R	A	A	A	1R	A	A	2R	Q2	A		2–5
Hamburg	A	A	2R	A	A	A	Q1	Not Masters Series							1–1
Win–loss	0–0	2–2	2–4	5–6	0–3	0–0	2–3	3–9	7–7	1–5	0–3	1–4	1–2	1–1	25–49

=== Doubles ===
Current till US Open.

Tournament	2004	2005	2006	2008	2009	2010	2011	2012	2013	2014	W–L
Grand Slam tournaments
Australian Open	1R	A	1R	A	1R	A	1R	2R	2R	A	2–6
French Open	A	1R	A	A	A	1R	1R	2R	1R	A	1–5
Wimbledon	A	2R	A	2R	2R	A	A	A	A	A	3–3
US Open	A	2R	A	1R	1R	2R	1R	A	1R	A	2–6
Win–loss	0–1	2–3	0–1	1–2	1–3	1–2	0–3	2–2	1–3	0–0	8–20
