= Jérémy Chardy =

French tennis player (born 1987)

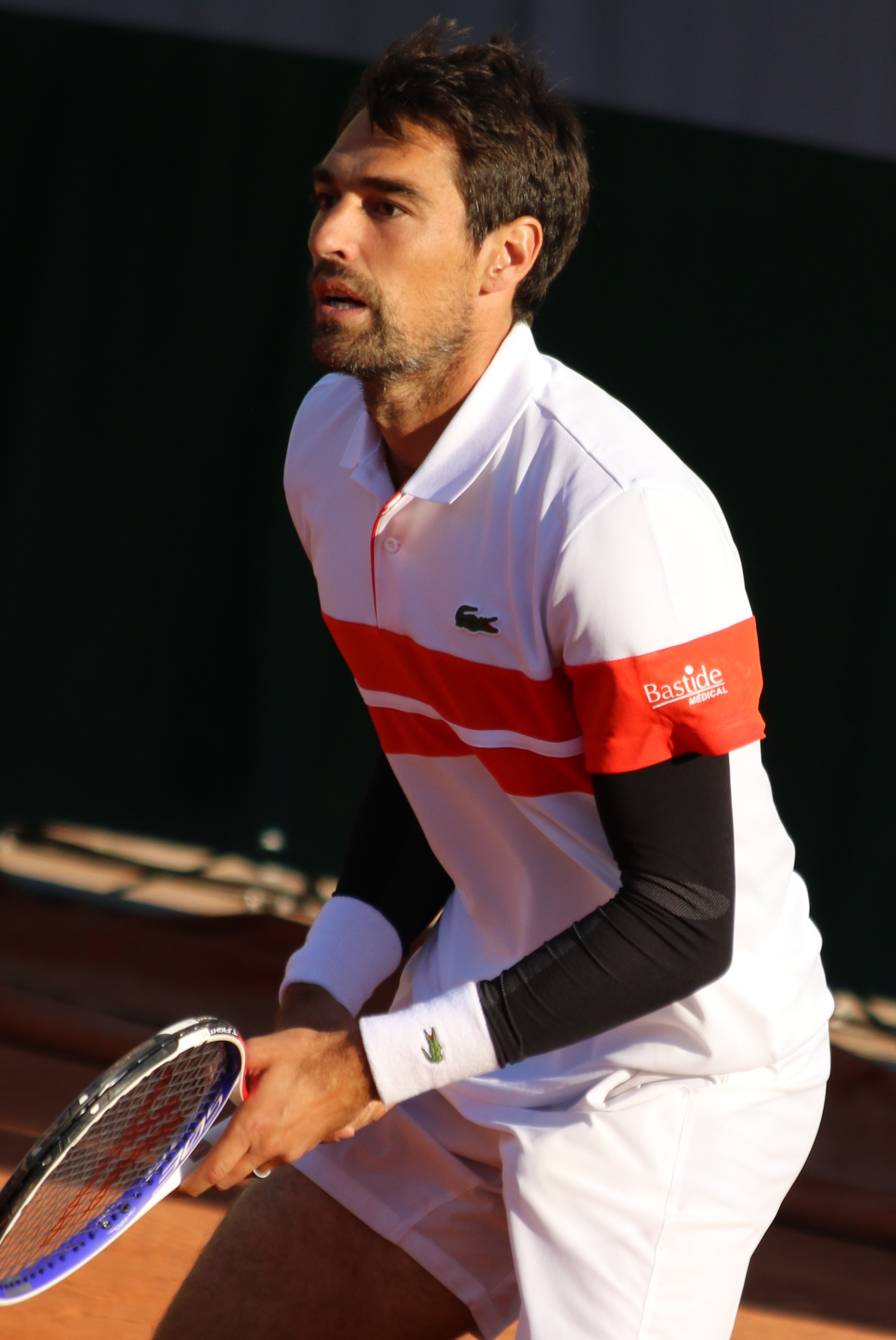
- Chardy at the 2019 French Open
- Country (sports): France
- Residence: London, England
- Born: 12 February 1987 (age 39) Pau, France
- Height: 1.88 m (6 ft 2 in)
- Turned pro: 2005
- Retired: 2023
- Plays: Right-handed (two-handed backhand)
- Coach: Philipp Wagner
- Prize money: US $10,857,975

Singles
- Career record: 298–307
- Career titles: 1
- Highest ranking: No. 25 (28 January 2013)

Grand Slam singles results
- Australian Open: QF (2013)
- French Open: 4R (2008, 2015)
- Wimbledon: 4R (2014)
- US Open: 4R (2015)

Other tournaments
- Olympic Games: QF (2021)

Doubles
- Career record: 176–188
- Career titles: 7
- Highest ranking: No. 24 (3 February 2020)

Grand Slam doubles results
- Australian Open: SF (2023)
- French Open: F (2019)
- Wimbledon: 3R (2021)
- US Open: 3R (2010, 2016, 2017, 2018, 2019)

Other doubles tournaments
- Olympic Games: 2R (2021)

Grand Slam mixed doubles results
- French Open: 2R (2013, 2014)
- Wimbledon: QF (2021)

Team competitions
- Davis Cup: W (2017)
- Last updated on: as of 19 January 2024.

Jérémy Chardy (French pronunciation: [ʒeʁemi ʃaʁdi]; born 12 February 1987) is a French tennis coach and a former professional player. He won one ATP Tour singles title in Stuttgart in 2009. His best major performance in singles was reaching the quarterfinals of the 2013 Australian Open, and in doubles was reaching the final at the 2019 French Open partnering Fabrice Martin. He achieved a career-high singles ranking of world No. 25 on 28 January 2013 and No. 24 on 3 February 2020 in doubles.

== Tennis career ==
=== Juniors ===
Chardy won the 2005 Wimbledon Championships Boys' Singles title, and finished as the runner-up at the 2005 US Open Boys' Singles, losing to Ryan Sweeting.

As a junior Chardy compiled a 65–28 singles win–loss record and reached as high as No. 3 in the junior combined world rankings in September 2005.

=== 2006–2008: Breaking into the top 100 of the ATP singles rankings ===
Chardy made his Grand Slam debut in 2006, receiving a wild card at the French Open, where he beat Jonas Björkman in straight sets in the first round, before losing in four sets to fifteenth-seeded David Ferrer in the second round.

In 2008, after losing the final of the Marrakech Challenger in May to eventual French Open semifinalist Gaël Monfils, Chardy produced his best Grand Slam showing until 2013 at the French Open, where he entered as a wild card and came back in the second round from two-sets-to-love down to defeat World No. 6 David Nalbandian in five sets (only dropping 5 games in the final three sets). He continued his run by beating 30th seed Dmitry Tursunov, before losing in the fourth round to 19th seed Nicolás Almagro in straight sets (Chardy held set points in each of the three sets).

=== 2009: First ATP World Tour singles title ===
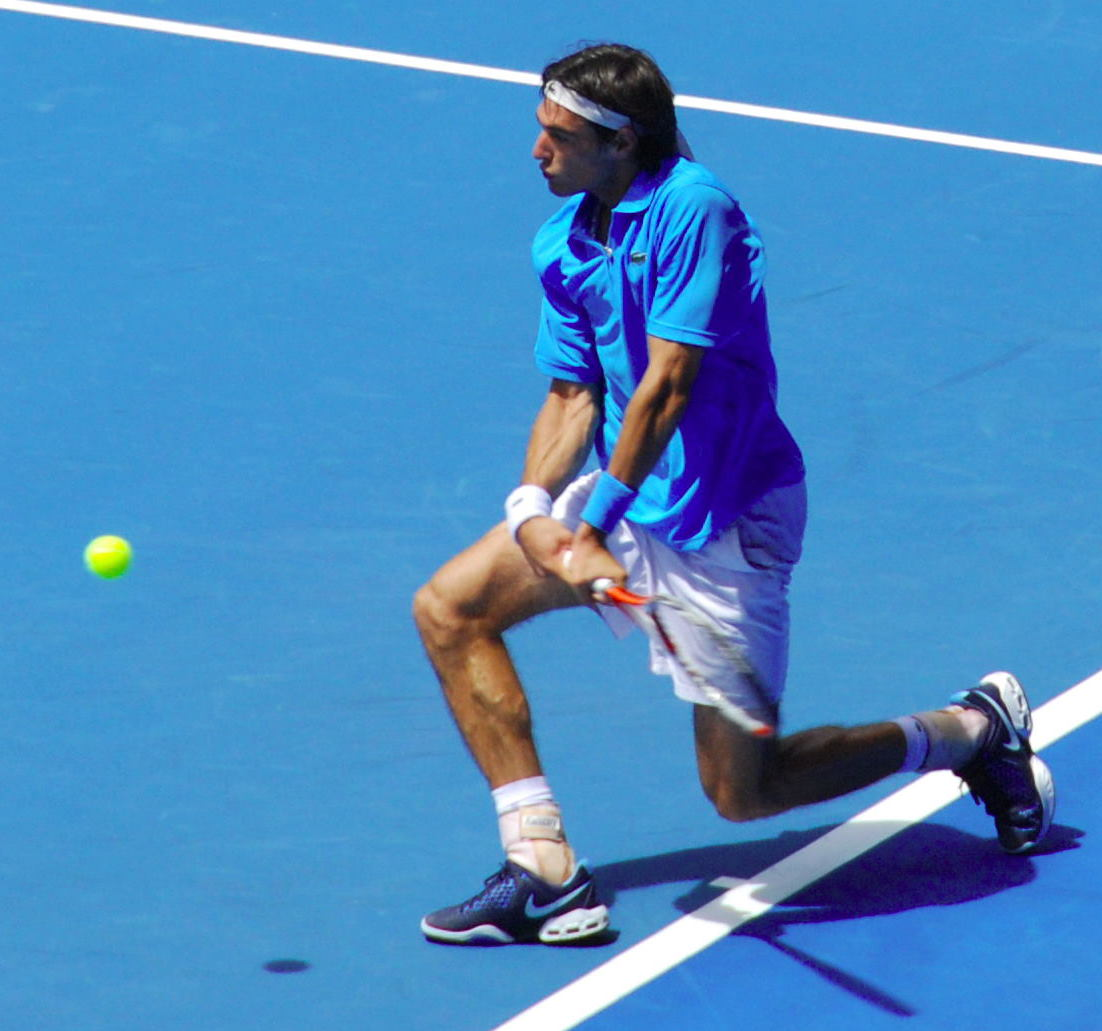
Chardy at the 2009 Australian Open

In 2009, he began with a first-round loss in Doha, before reaching the quarterfinals in Sydney, where he fell to Richard Gasquet. At the Australian Open, he fell in the second round to defending champion Novak Djokovic.

In his next tournament at Johannesburg, he reached the semifinals, following three straight-sets wins. In the semifinals, he came up against World No. 13 David Ferrer and saved three match points in the second set to win in a final set tiebreak, and reach his first ATP final. Chardy lost in the final to Jo-Wilfried Tsonga.

He lost in the opening round of his next tournament, the 2009 Open 13 in Marseille, to Novak Djokovic. In Delray Beach, he was seeded seventh and defeated Tommy Haas, Andrey Golubev and Marcos Baghdatis. He fell in the semifinals to top seed and eventual winner, Mardy Fish.

Chardy frequently plays doubles with compatriot Gilles Simon. They most recently competed at the Monte-Carlo Masters together, losing to Nikolay Davydenko and Oliver Marach in the first round.

At Wimbledon, Chardy lost in the first round in four sets to eventual runner-up Andy Roddick.

Next, Chardy played at the MercedesCup in Stuttgart. He defeated José Acasuso, Martín Vassallo Argüello and local hopes Mischa Zverev and Nicolas Kiefer, on the same day to reach his second career final. He triumphed over fourth-seeded Victor Hănescu (after losing the first set 1–6) to clinch his maiden ATP World Tour singles title.

=== 2010: First Masters singles quarterfinal ===
At the beginning of the 2010 season, he started poorly; losing in the first rounds of the Brisbane International, Heineken Open, the Australian Open, and the SAP Open. However, he finally registered his first win in the tour, at the 2010 Regions Morgan Keegan Championships in style, as he beat second seed Fernando Verdasco in the first round. This was arguably his best win to date and only his fourth win against a top-10 player. At the 2010 Rogers Cup, Chardy defeated Verdasco once more in the second round and followed this up with an easy win over sixth-ranked Nikolay Davydenko in the round of 16, before losing to Novak Djokovic in the quarterfinals.

=== 2011: Madrid Challenger singles title ===
In 2011, Chardy played principally in Challenger tournaments, reaching several finals, both in singles and in doubles. He qualified for the Kremlin Cup and reached the semifinals, where he was defeated by Victor Troicki.

=== 2012: 100th career singles win, top 30 debut ===
In the 2012 Western and Southern Open in Cincinnati, Jérémy Chardy upset the defending champion and Olympic singles gold medalist Andy Murray in straight sets. Murray had easily beaten him the last four times he faced Chardy. Jérémy was defeated by Juan Martín del Potro in the quarterfinals, in straight sets.

=== 2013: First Major quarterfinal & career-high ranking in singles ===
Chardy started the year impressively, reaching the quarter-finals of the 2013 Australian Open. Along the way he defeated three seeded players: 30th seed Marcel Granollers (6–3, 3–6, 6–1, 6–2), 6th seed Juan Martín del Potro in five sets (6–3, 6–3, 6–7, 3–6, 6–3), and 21st seed Andreas Seppi from a set down (5–7, 6–3, 6–2, 6–2). In the quarter-finals he was beaten by World No. 2 Andy Murray in straight sets (6–4, 6–1, 6–2). This run propelled Chardy to a career-high singles ranking of World No. 25. He lost in the third round of the French Open, to countryman Jo-Wilfried Tsonga. He also lost in the third round of Wimbledon to Novak Djokovic, winning just seven games.

=== 2014–2016: 150th career singles win and first Masters singles semifinal ===
In 2014 Chardy capped off 2014 recording 33 wins and 27 losses in singles. He registered his 150th career singles win at the 2014 Wimbledon Championships.

In 2015, Chardy reached his first Masters semifinal after saving seven match points against John Isner in the Rogers Cup quarter-finals, before losing to world no.1 Novak Djokovic 6–4,6–4 in the semifinals. As the no. 30 seed, Chardy lost in the 3rd round of the 2016 French Open to third-seeded Stan Wawrinka in straight sets.

=== 2019–2020: French Open & Rome Masters Doubles finalist ===
At the 2019 French Open, Chardy, partnered with Fabrice Martin, reached the final, losing to unseeded German pair Kevin Krawietz and Andreas Mies in straight sets.

Again partnering with Martin, Chardy reached the final of the 2020 Rome Masters, where the pair lost to Marcel Granollers and Horacio Zeballos.

=== 2021–2022: Two ATP 250 semifinals & 500 quarterfinals, back to top 50, Olympics, hiatus ===
Chardy began his 2021 season by reaching the semifinals of Antalya and Melbourne 2, where he lost to Alexander Bublik and Dan Evans, respectively.

At the Australian Open, he lost to eventual champion Novak Djokovic in the first round in straight sets.

At Rotterdam, Chardy reached the quarterfinals, upsetting 6th seed David Goffin along the way. He lost to 4th seed Andrey Rublev in a tightly contested 3 set match.

For a second time he reached the quarterfinals of an ATP 500 tournament at the Dubai Championships upsetting two seeded players Alex De Minaur and Karen Khachanov before losing to a third seeded player Denis Shapovalov. Because of this successful run and achieving good results, Chardy returned to the top 50 in two years, at the end of March.

After 10 years of absence and in only his third participation, Chardy reached the third round of the 2021 Wimbledon Championships in doubles for the first time in his career partnering with Fabrice Martin after the retirement of their compatriots Nicolas Mahut and Pierre-Hugues Herbert in the second round.

Chardy also reached the quarterfinals in the Olympics, beating Tomás Barrios, Aslan Karatsev and Liam Broady. He lost to Alexander Zverev in the quarterfinals.

On 23 September 2021, Chardy suspended his season, saying he suffered an adverse reaction to a COVID-19 vaccination, and was unable to train or play.

=== 2023: Comeback, Australian doubles semifinal, retirement ===
At the 2023 Australian Open, he used protected ranking to enter the singles event. In doubles at the same tournament, he reached the semifinals with compatriot Fabrice Martin.

At the 2023 Wimbledon Championships, he announced that this will be his final singles tournament.

== Coaching career ==
He coached compatriot Ugo Humbert from July 2022 until January 2025.

In December 2024, Chardy started coaching Alycia Parks.

In September 2025, Chardy restarted coaching Ugo Humbert.

== Performance timelines ==
Key
| W | F | SF | QF | #R | RR | Q# | P# | DNQ | A | Z# | PO | G | S | B | NMS | NTI | P | NH |

(W) winner; (F) finalist; (SF) semifinalist; (QF) quarterfinalist; (#R) rounds 4, 3, 2, 1; (RR) round-robin stage; (Q#) qualification round; (P#) preliminary round; (DNQ) did not qualify; (A) absent; (Z#) Davis/Fed Cup Zonal Group (with number indication) or (PO) play-off; (G) gold, (S) silver or (B) bronze Olympic/Paralympic medal; (NMS) not a Masters tournament; (NTI) not a Tier I tournament; (P) postponed; (NH) not held; (SR) strike rate (events won / competed); (W–L) win–loss record.
To avoid confusion and double counting, these charts are updated at the conclusion of a tournament or when the player's participation has ended.

=== Singles ===
| Tournament | 2005 | 2006 | 2007 | 2008 | 2009 | 2010 | 2011 | 2012 | 2013 | 2014 | 2015 | 2016 | 2017 | 2018 | 2019 | 2020 | 2021 | 2022 | 2023 | SR | W–L | Win% |
|---|---|---|---|---|---|---|---|---|---|---|---|---|---|---|---|---|---|---|---|---|---|---|
Grand Slam tournaments
| Australian Open | A | A | Q1 | Q1 | 2R | 1R | 1R | 1R | QF | 3R | 2R | 2R | 2R | 1R | 2R | 1R | 1R | A | 2R | 0 / 14 | 12–14 | 46% |
| French Open | Q2 | 2R | Q1 | 4R | 3R | 1R | 2R | 2R | 3R | 2R | 4R | 3R | 2R | 2R | 1R | 1R | 1R | A | A | 0 / 15 | 18–15 | 55% |
| Wimbledon | A | A | A | 2R | 1R | 3R | 1R | 2R | 3R | 4R | 1R | 2R | 1R | 1R | 2R | NH | 2R | A | 1R | 0 / 14 | 12–14 | 46% |
| US Open | A | A | A | 2R | 1R | 2R | A | 3R | 2R | 2R | 4R | 2R | 1R | 2R | 2R | 1R | 1R | A | A | 0 / 13 | 12–13 | 48% |
| Win–loss | 0–0 | 1–1 | 0–0 | 5–3 | 3–4 | 3–4 | 1–3 | 4–4 | 9–4 | 7–4 | 7–4 | 5–4 | 2–4 | 2–4 | 1–1 | 0–3 | 1–4 | 0–0 | 1–2 | 0 / 56 | 54–56 | 49% |
ATP Masters 1000
| Indian Wells Masters | A | A | A | A | 3R | 2R | 1R | 1R | 2R | 2R | 2R | 2R | 2R | 4R | 1R | NH | A | A | A | 0 / 11 | 8–11 | 42% |
| Miami Masters | A | A | A | A | 1R | 3R | 1R | 1R | 2R | 2R | 3R | 2R | 3R | 4R | 3R | NH | 1R | A | A | 0 / 12 | 11–12 | 50% |
| Monte-Carlo Masters | A | A | A | A | 1R | 1R | 1R | A | 1R | 2R | 2R | 2R | 2R | 1R | 1R | NH | 2R | A | A | 0 / 11 | 5–11 | 29% |
| Madrid Masters | A | A | A | A | 2R | 1R | A | A | 2R | 2R | 1R | 1R | A | A | 3R | NH | 1R | A | 1R | 0 / 9 | 5–9 | 36% |
| Rome Masters | A | A | A | A | 1R | 2R | A | A | 3R | QF | 2R | 3R | A | A | 2R | Q2 | A | A | 1R | 0 / 8 | 10–8 | 55% |
| Canadian Masters | A | A | A | A | 2R | QF | 1R | 3R | 1R | 2R | SF | 1R | A | 1R | A | NH | A | A | A | 0 / 9 | 11–9 | 55% |
| Cincinnati Masters | A | A | A | A | 3R | 2R | Q1 | QF | 2R | 1R | 2R | 1R | A | 2R | A | Q1 | Q1 | A | A | 0 / 8 | 9–8 | 53% |
| Shanghai Masters | NMS | | | | 1R | 3R | A | 1R | 2R | 1R | 1R | A | 1R | 2R | 2R | NH | | | A | 0 / 9 | 5–9 | 36% |
| Paris Masters | A | A | A | 1R | 1R | A | 2R | 2R | 1R | 2R | 2R | A | 2R | 1R | 3R | A | A | A | A | 0 / 10 | 7–10 | 41% |
| Win–loss | 0–0 | 0–0 | 0–0 | 0–1 | 6–9 | 10–8 | 1–5 | 6–6 | 5–9 | 9–9 | 9–9 | 3–7 | 5–5 | 8–7 | 8–2 | 0–0 | 1–3 | 0–0 | 0–2 | 0 / 87 | 71–87 | 45% |
Career statistics
| | 2005 | 2006 | 2007 | 2008 | 2009 | 2010 | 2011 | 2012 | 2013 | 2014 | 2015 | 2016 | 2017 | 2018 | 2019 | 2020 | 2021 | 2022 | 2023 | Career | | |
| Tournaments | 0 | 2 | 3 | 9 | 29 | 28 | 18 | 20 | 25 | 27 | 27 | 21 | 21 | 21 | 27 | 5 | 18 | 0 | 4 | Career total: 305 | | |
| Titles | 0 | 0 | 0 | 0 | 1 | 0 | 0 | 0 | 0 | 0 | 0 | 0 | 0 | 0 | 0 | 0 | 0 | 0 | 0 | Career total: 1 | | |
| Finals | 0 | 0 | 0 | 0 | 2 | 0 | 0 | 0 | 0 | 0 | 0 | 0 | 0 | 1 | 0 | 0 | 0 | 0 | 0 | Career total: 3 | | |
| Overall win-loss | 0–0 | 2–2 | 0–3 | 10–9 | 35–28 | 26–29 | 10–18 | 24–20 | 22–25 | 33–27 | 27–27 | 17–21 | 18–21 | 24–23 | 28–27 | 2–5 | 19–18 | 0–0 | 1–4 | 1 / 305 | 298–307 | 49% |
| Win % | – | 50% | 0% | 53% | 56% | 47% | 36% | 55% | 47% | 55% | 50% | 45% | 46% | 51% | 51% | 29% | 51% | – | 20% | Career total: 49% | | |
| Year-end ranking | 564 | 262 | 188 | 73 | 32 | 45 | 103 | 32 | 34 | 29 | 31 | 69 | 78 | 40 | 51 | 75 | 107 | – | | $10,779,425 | | |

=== Doubles ===
| Tournament | 2005 | 2006 | 2007 | 2008 | 2009 | 2010 | 2011 | 2012 | 2013 | 2014 | 2015 | 2016 | 2017 | 2018 | 2019 | 2020 | 2021 | 2022 | 2023 | SR | W–L | Win% |
|---|---|---|---|---|---|---|---|---|---|---|---|---|---|---|---|---|---|---|---|---|---|---|
Grand Slam tournaments
| Australian Open | A | A | A | A | 1R | 1R | 2R | A | 3R | A | 2R | 1R | 2R | 3R | 2R | 1R | 1R | A | SF | 0 / 12 | 11–12 | 47.83% |
| French Open | 1R | 1R | 1R | 1R | 1R | A | 1R | 1R | 1R | 2R | 3R | 1R | 1R | 1R | F | 3R | 2R | A | 1R | 0 / 17 | 11–17 | 39.29% |
| Wimbledon | A | A | A | 1R | A | 1R | A | A | A | A | A | A | A | A | A | NH | 3R | A | 1R | 0 / 4 | 2–4 | 33.33% |
| US Open | A | A | A | 1R | 1R | 3R | A | 1R | A | A | 2R | 3R | 3R | 3R | 3R | 1R | 2R | A | A | 0 / 11 | 12–11 | 52.17% |
| Win–loss | 0–1 | 0–1 | 0–1 | 0–3 | 0–3 | 2–3 | 1–2 | 0–2 | 2–2 | 1–1 | 4–3 | 2–3 | 3–3 | 3–3 | 8–3 | 2–3 | 4–4 | 0–0 | 4–3 | 0 / 44 | 36–44 | 45% |
ATP Masters 1000
| Indian Wells Masters | A | A | A | A | 1R | A | A | A | A | 1R | 1R | QF | A | A | 1R | NH | A | A | A | 0 / 5 | 2–5 | 28.57% |
| Miami Masters | A | A | A | A | 1R | A | A | A | A | A | QF | QF | A | A | 1R | NH | 1R | A | A | 0 / 5 | 4–5 | 44.44% |
| Monte-Carlo Masters | A | A | A | A | 1R | A | 2R | A | A | 2R | 1R | 1R | A | A | A | NH | 1R | A | A | 0 / 6 | 2–6 | 25% |
| Madrid Masters | A | A | A | A | A | 1R | A | A | SF | A | 2R | 1R | A | A | 1R | NH | QF | A | A | 0 / 6 | 6–6 | 50% |
| Rome Masters | A | A | A | A | 1R | 1R | A | A | 1R | A | SF | 1R | A | A | 2R | F | A | A | A | 0 / 7 | 8–7 | 53.33% |
| Canadian Masters | A | A | A | A | 1R | A | A | 2R | 1R | A | 1R | A | A | 1R | QF | NH | A | A | A | 0 / 6 | 3–6 | 33.33% |
| Cincinnati Masters | A | A | A | A | 2R | A | A | A | 2R | A | 1R | 1R | A | A | 1R | 1R | A | A | A | 0 / 6 | 2–6 | 25% |
| Shanghai Masters | NMS | | | | A | A | A | A | A | 1R | 2R | A | A | A | 1R | NH | | | A | 0 / 3 | 1–3 | 25% |
| Paris Masters | A | A | A | A | 1R | A | A | 1R | 2R | A | A | A | A | A | QF | A | A | A | A | 0 / 4 | 2–4 | 33.33% |
| Win–loss | 0–0 | 0–0 | 0–0 | 0–0 | 1–7 | 0–2 | 1–1 | 1–2 | 5–5 | 1–3 | 7–8 | 4–6 | 0–0 | 0–1 | 4–8 | 4–2 | 2–3 | 0–0 | 0–0 | 0 / 48 | 30–48 | 38.46% |

== Significant finals ==
=== Grand Slam tournament finals ===
==== Doubles: 1 (1 runner-up) ====
| Result | Year | Championship | Surface | Partner | Opponents | Score |
|---|---|---|---|---|---|---|
| Loss | 2019 | French Open | Clay | (France) Fabrice Martin | (Germany) Kevin Krawietz (Germany) Andreas Mies | 2–6, 6–7^{(3–7)} |

=== Masters 1000 finals ===
==== Doubles: 1 (1 runner-up) ====
| Result | Year | Tournament | Surface | Partner | Opponents | Score |
|---|---|---|---|---|---|---|
| Loss | 2020 | Italian Open | Clay | (France) Fabrice Martin | (Spain) Marcel Granollers (Argentina) Horacio Zeballos | 4–6, 7–5, [8–10] |

== ATP Tour finals ==
=== Singles: 3 (1 title, 2 runner-up) ===
| Legend Grand Slam (0–0) ATP Masters 1000 (0–0) ATP 500 Series (0–0) ATP 250 Series (1–2) | Titles by surface Hard (0–1) Clay (1–0) Grass (0–1) | Titles by setting Outdoor (1–2) Indoor (0–0) |

| Result | W–L | Date | Tournament | Tier | Surface | Opponent | Score |
|---|---|---|---|---|---|---|---|
| Loss | 0–1 | Feb 2009 | SA Tennis Open, South Africa | 250 Series | Hard | (France) Jo-Wilfried Tsonga | 4–6, 6–7^{(5–7)} |
| Win | 1–1 | Jul 2009 | Stuttgart Open, Germany | 250 Series | Clay | (Romania) Victor Hănescu | 1–6, 6–3, 6–4 |
| Loss | 1–2 | Jun 2018 | Rosmalen Championships, Netherlands | 250 Series | Grass | (France) Richard Gasquet | 3–6, 6–7^{(5–7)} |

=== Doubles: 17 (7 titles, 10 runners-up) ===
| Legend Grand Slam (0–1) ATP Masters 1000 (0–1) ATP 500 Series (1–3) ATP 250 Series (6–5) | Titles by surface Hard (4–4) Clay (3–6) Grass (0–0) | Titles by setting Outdoor (5–8) Indoor (2–2) |

| Result | W–L | Date | Tournament | Tier | Surface | Partner | Opponents | Score |
|---|---|---|---|---|---|---|---|---|
| Loss | 0–1 | Nov 2009 | St. Petersburg Open, Russia | 250 Series | Hard (i) | (France) Richard Gasquet | (United Kingdom) Colin Fleming (United Kingdom) Ken Skupski | 6–2, 5–7, [4–10] |
| Win | 1–1 | Jan 2010 | Brisbane International, Australia | 250 Series | Hard | (France) Marc Gicquel | (Czech Republic) Lukáš Dlouhý (India) Leander Paes | 6–3, 7–6^{(7–5)} |
| Loss | 1–2 | Jul 2010 | German Open, Germany | 500 Series | Clay | (France) Paul-Henri Mathieu | (Spain) Marc López (Spain) David Marrero | 3–6, 6–2, [8–10] |
| Loss | 1–3 | Feb 2011 | Dubai Championships, UAE | 500 Series | Hard | (Spain) Feliciano López | (Ukraine) Sergiy Stakhovsky (Russia) Mikhail Youzhny | 6–4, 3–6, [3–10] |
| Loss | 1–4 | Apr 2012 | Romanian Open, Romania | 250 Series | Clay | (Poland) Łukasz Kubot | (Sweden) Robert Lindstedt (Romania) Horia Tecău | 6–7^{(2–7)}, 3–6 |
| Win | 2–4 | Jul 2012 | Stuttgart Open, Germany | 250 Series | Clay | (Poland) Łukasz Kubot | (Slovakia) Michal Mertiňák (Brazil) André Sá | 6–1, 6–3 |
| Loss | 2–5 | Jul 2014 | Swedish Open, Sweden | 250 Series | Clay | (Austria) Oliver Marach | (Sweden) Johan Brunström (United States) Nicholas Monroe | 6–4, 6–7^{(5–7)}, [7–10] |
| Loss | 2–6 | Oct 2014 | Valencia Open, Spain | 500 Series | Hard (i) | (South Africa) Kevin Anderson | (Netherlands) Jean-Julien Rojer (Romania) Horia Tecău | 4–6, 2–6 |
| Win | 3–6 | Jul 2015 | Swedish Open, Sweden | 250 Series | Clay | (Poland) Łukasz Kubot | (Colombia) Juan Sebastián Cabal (Colombia) Robert Farah | 6–7^{(6–8)}, 6–3, [10–8] |
| Win | 4–6 | Jan 2017 | Qatar Open, Qatar | 250 Series | Hard | (France) Fabrice Martin | (Canada) Vasek Pospisil (Czech Republic) Radek Štěpánek | 6–4, 7–6^{(7–3)} |
| Loss | 4–7 | May 2017 | Bavarian Championships, Germany | 250 Series | Clay | (France) Fabrice Martin | (Colombia) Juan Sebastián Cabal (Colombia) Robert Farah | 3–6, 3–6 |
| Win | 5–7 | Feb 2019 | Rotterdam Open, Netherlands | 500 Series | Hard (i) | (Finland) Henri Kontinen | (Netherlands) Jean-Julien Rojer (Romania) Horia Tecău | 7–6^{(7–5)}, 7–6^{(7–4)} |
| Win | 6–7 | Feb 2019 | Open 13, France | 250 Series | Hard (i) | (France) Fabrice Martin | (Japan) Ben McLachlan (Netherlands) Matwé Middelkoop | 6–3, 6–7^{(4–7)}, [10–3] |
| Win | 7–7 | May 2019 | Estoril Open, Portugal | 250 Series | Clay | (France) Fabrice Martin | (United Kingdom) Luke Bambridge (United Kingdom) Jonny O'Mara | 7–5, 7–6^{(7–3)} |
| Loss | 7–8 | Jun 2019 | French Open, France | Grand Slam | Clay | (France) Fabrice Martin | (Germany) Kevin Krawietz (Germany) Andreas Mies | 2–6, 6–7^{(3–7)} |
| Loss | 7–9 | Sep 2020 | Italian Open, Italy | Masters 1000 | Clay | (France) Fabrice Martin | (Spain) Marcel Granollers (Argentina) Horacio Zeballos | 4–6, 7–5, [8–10] |
| Loss | 7–10 | Feb 2021 | Murray River Open, Australia | 250 Series | Hard | (France) Fabrice Martin | (Croatia) Nikola Mektić (Croatia) Mate Pavić | 6–7^{(2–7)}, 3–6 |

== ATP Challenger Tour and ITF finals ==
=== Singles: 13 (7 titles, 6 runner–ups) ===
| Legend (singles) ATP Challenger Tour (6–4) ITF Futures Tour (1–2) | Titles by surface Hard (2–1) Clay (4–4) Grass (1–1) Carpet (0–0) |

| Result | W–L | Date | Tournament | Tier | Surface | Opponent | Score |
|---|---|---|---|---|---|---|---|
| Win | 1–0 | Apr 2005 | France F2, Grasse | Futures | Clay | (Belgium) Stefan Wauters | 6–2, 6–3 |
| Loss | 1–1 | Jan 2006 | Great Britain F2, Barnstaple | Futures | Hard | (France) Stéphane Robert | 6–7^{(3)}, 1–6 |
| Loss | 1–2 | Mar 2006 | Morocco F3, Khemisset | Futures | Clay | (Czech Republic) Dušan Karol | 6–3, 3–6, 6–7^{(7)} |
| Win | 2–2 | Jun 2007 | Košice, Slovakia | Challenger | Clay | (Germany) Denis Gremelmayr | 4–6, 7–6^{(5)}, 6–4 |
| Win | 3–2 | Oct 2007 | Barnstaple, United Kingdom | Challenger | Hard | (Switzerland) Stéphane Bohli | 7–6^{(4)}, 6–7^{(1)}, 7–5 |
| Loss | 3–3 | May 2008 | Marrakech, Morocco | Challenger | Clay | (France) Gaël Monfils | 6–7^{(2)}, 6–7^{(6)} |
| Win | 4–3 | Aug 2008 | Graz, Austria | Challenger | Clay | (Argentina) Sergio Roitman | 6–2, 6–1 |
| Loss | 4–4 | Jun 2008 | Nottingham, United Kingdom | Challenger | Grass | (Israel) Dudi Sela | 4–6, 6–3, 5–7 |
| Win | 5–4 | Oct 2011 | Madrid, Spain | Challenger | Clay | (Spain) Daniel Gimeno Traver | 6–1, 5–7, 7–6^{(3)} |
| Win | 6–4 | Jan 2012 | Nouméa, New Caledonia (France) | Challenger | Hard | (Spain) Adrián Menéndez | 6–4, 6–3 |
| Loss | 6–5 | May 2012 | Tunis, Tunisia | Challenger | Clay | (Spain) Rubén Ramírez Hidalgo | 1–6, 4–6 |
| Loss | 6–6 | May 2017 | Aix-en-Provence, France | Challenger | Clay | (United States) Frances Tiafoe | 3–6, 6–4, 6–7^{(5)} |
| Win | 7–6 | Jun 2018 | Surbiton, United Kingdom | Challenger | Grass | (Australia) Alex de Minaur | 6–4, 4–6, 6–2 |

=== Doubles: 5 (2 titles, 3 runner–ups) ===
Legend
Challengers (1–3)
Futures (1–0)

| Result | W–L | Date | Tournament | Tier | Surface | Partner | Opponents | Score |
|---|---|---|---|---|---|---|---|---|
| Win | 1–0 | Mar 2006 | Khemisset, Morocco | Futures | Clay | (Czech Republic) Dušan Karol | (Italy) Fabio Colangelo (Italy) Marco Crugnola | 7–5, 7–5 |
| Win | 2–0 | Apr 2007 | San Luis Potosí, Mexico | Challenger | Clay | (Brazil) Marcelo Melo | (Chile) Jorge Aguilar (Colombia) Pablo González | 6–0, 6–3 |
| Loss | 2–1 | Aug 2007 | Graz, Austria | Challenger | Clay | (North Macedonia) Predrag Rusevski | (Argentina) Sebastián Decoud (Kazakhstan) Yuri Schukin | 6–3, 3–6, [7–10] |
| Loss | 2–2 | Sep 2007 | Alphen aan den Rijn, Netherlands | Challenger | Clay | (North Macedonia) Predrag Rusevski | (Italy) Leonardo Azzaro (Croatia) Lovro Zovko | 3–6, 3–6 |
| Loss | 2–3 | May 2017 | Aix-en-Provence, France | Challenger | Clay | (Germany) Andre Begemann | (Netherlands) Wesley Koolhof (Netherlands) Matwé Middelkoop | 6–2, 4–6, [14–16] |

=== Junior Grand Slam finals ===
==== Singles: 2 (1 title, 1 runner-up) ====
| Result | Year | Tournament | Surface | Opponent | Score |
|---|---|---|---|---|---|
| Win | 2005 | Wimbledon | Grass | (Netherlands) Robin Haase | 6–4, 6–3 |
| Loss | 2005 | US Open | Hard | (The Bahamas) Ryan Sweeting | 4–6, 4–6 |

==== Doubles: 1 (1 runner-up) ====
| Result | Year | Tournament | Surface | Partner | Opponents | Score |
|---|---|---|---|---|---|---|
| Loss | 2005 | French Open | Clay | (Ukraine) Sergei Bubka | (Argentina) Emiliano Massa (Argentina) Leonardo Mayer | 6–2, 3–6, 4–6 |

== Record against other players ==
=== Record against top 10 players ===
Chardy's match record against those who have been ranked in the top 10, with those who have been No. 1 in boldface

- (United States) John Isner 4–0
- (Spain) Pablo Carreño Busta 4–2
- (France) Gilles Simon 4–4
- (Cyprus) Marcos Baghdatis 3–1
- (Spain) Fernando Verdasco 3–2
- (Latvia) Ernests Gulbis 3–3
- (Croatia) Marin Čilić 3–4
- (France) Richard Gasquet 3–5
- (Croatia) Mario Ančić 2–0
- (Germany) Nicolas Kiefer 2–0
- (France) Lucas Pouille 2–0
- (Argentina) Diego Schwartzman 2–0
- (Russia) **Daniil Medvedev** 2–1
- (Spain) Roberto Bautista Agut 2–2
- (Austria) Jürgen Melzer 2–2
- (Bulgaria) Grigor Dimitrov 2–4
- (Italy) Fabio Fognini 2–4
- (Argentina) Juan Mónaco 2–6
- (Spain) David Ferrer 2–7
- (Sweden) Jonas Björkman 1–0
- (United States) James Blake 1–0
- (Czech Republic) Radek Štěpánek 1–0
- (Russia) Nikolay Davydenko 1–1
- (Russia) Karen Khachanov 1–1
- (Argentina) David Nalbandian 1–1
- (United States) Mardy Fish 1–2
- (Belgium) David Goffin 1–2
- (Germany) Tommy Haas 1–2
- (France) Gaël Monfils 1–2
- (Spain) Tommy Robredo 1–2
- (Russia) Mikhail Youzhny 1–2
- (South Africa) Kevin Anderson 1–3
- (Argentina) Juan Martín del Potro 1–3
- (United States) **Andy Roddick** 1–3
- (Russia) Andrey Rublev 1–3
- (Greece) Stefanos Tsitsipas 1–3
- (Switzerland) **Roger Federer** 1–4
- (Serbia) Janko Tipsarević 1–4
- (France) Jo-Wilfried Tsonga 1–4
- (Spain) Nicolás Almagro 1–5
- (Czech Republic) Tomáš Berdych 1–5
- (Germany) Alexander Zverev 1–5
- (United Kingdom) **Andy Murray** 1–9
- (France) Arnaud Clément 0–1
- (Chile) Fernando González 0–1
- (Croatia) Ivan Ljubičić 0–1
- (Germany) Rainer Schüttler 0–1
- (Austria) Dominic Thiem 0–1
- (Italy) Matteo Berrettini 0–2
- (Sweden) Robin Söderling 0–2
- (Australia) **Lleyton Hewitt** 0–3
- (Spain) **Rafael Nadal** 0–3
- (United States) Jack Sock 0–3
- (Canada) Denis Shapovalov 0–4
- (Canada) Milos Raonic 0–7
- (Switzerland) Stan Wawrinka 0–7
- (Serbia) **Novak Djokovic** 0–14

*As of 31 August 2021.

=== Wins over top-10 players ===
- He has a 12–68 record against players who were, at the time the match was played, ranked in the top ten.

| **Season** | **2008** | **2009** | **2010** | **2011** | **2012** | **2013** | **2014** | **2015** | **2016** | **2017** | **2018** | **2019** | **Total** |
| Wins | 1 | 0 | 2 | 1 | 2 | 1 | 1 | 1 | 0 | 1 | 1 | 1 | **12** |

| # | Player | Rank | Event | Surface | Rd | Score | JCR |
|---|---|---|---|---|---|---|---|
**2008**
| 1. | (Argentina) David Nalbandian | No. 7 | French Open | Clay | 2R | 3–6, 4–6, 6–2, 6–1, 6–2 | No. 145 |
**2010**
| 2. | (Spain) Fernando Verdasco | No. 10 | Canadian Open | Hard | 2R | 6–7^{(7–9)}, 7–6^{(7–5)}, 6–2 | No. 72 |
| 3. | (Russia) Nikolay Davydenko | No. 6 | Canadian Open | Hard | 3R | 6–3, 6–2 | No. 72 |
**2011**
| 4. | (Austria) Jürgen Melzer | No. 10 | Davis Cup, Vienna, Austria | Hard (i) | RR | 7–5, 6–4, 7–5 | No. 55 |
**2012**
| 5. | (France) Jo-Wilfried Tsonga | No. 6 | Canadian Open | Hard | 2R | 6–4, 7–6^{(7–4)} | No. 47 |
| 6. | (United Kingdom) Andy Murray | No. 4 | Cincinnati Masters, United States | Hard | 3R | 6–4, 6–4 | No. 38 |
**2013**
| 7. | (Argentina) Juan Martín del Potro | No. 7 | Australian Open | Hard | 3R | 6–3, 6–3, 6–7^{(3–7)}, 3–6, 6–3 | No. 36 |
**2014**
| 8. | (Switzerland) Roger Federer | No. 4 | Italian Open | Clay | 2R | 1–6, 6–3, 7–6^{(8–6)} | No. 47 |
**2015**
| 9. | (Spain) David Ferrer | No. 7 | US Open | Hard | 3R | 7–6^{(8–6)}, 4–6, 6–3, 6–1 | No. 27 |
**2017**
| 10. | (Croatia) Marin Čilić | No. 9 | Miami Masters, United States | Hard | 2R | 6–4, 2–6, 6–3 | No. 77 |
**2018**
| 11. | (Bulgaria) Grigor Dimitrov | No. 4 | Miami Masters, United States | Hard | 3R | 6–4, 6–4 | No. 90 |
**2019**
| 12. | (Russia) Daniil Medvedev | No. 4 | Paris Masters, France | Hard (i) | 2R | 4–6, 6–2, 6–4 | No. 65 |
