= 2010 SA Tennis Open – Singles =

Singles
- 2010 SA Tennis Open

Final
- Champion: (Spain) Feliciano López
- Runner-up: (France) Stéphane Robert
- Score: 7–5, 6–1

Events
Singles	Doubles
← 2009 ·	SA Tennis Open	· 2011 →

Jo-Wilfried Tsonga was the defending champion, but he resigned from the participation in this tournament due to tiredness caused by his performance at the 2010 Australian Open (he reached the semifinals, where he lost to Roger Federer).

Feliciano López won in the final 7–5, 6–1 against Stéphane Robert. It was López's second title of his career, and first since 2004.

== Seeds ==
1. (France) Gaël Monfils (semifinals)
2. (Spain) David Ferrer (semifinals)
3. (Spain) Feliciano López (champion)
4. (Switzerland) Marco Chiudinelli (first round)
5. (United States) Rajeev Ram (quarterfinals)
6. (Belgium) Xavier Malisse (first round)
7. (Chinese Taipei) Lu Yen-hsun (quarterfinals)
8. (France) Stéphane Robert (final)

== Draw ==
=== Key ===
- Q = Qualifier
- WC = Wild card
- LL = Lucky loser
- Alt = Alternate
- ITF = ITF entry
- PR = Protected ranking
- SR = Special ranking
- SE = Special exempt
- JE = Junior exempt
- JR = Junior Accelerator Programme entrant
- CO = College Accelerator Programme entrant
- NG = Next Gen Accelerator Program entrant
- w/o = Walkover
- r = Retired
- d = Defaulted

=== Finals ===
Semifinals
1	(France) Gaël Monfils	6	1	6^{1}
3	(Spain) Feliciano López	3	6	7^{7}
8	(France) Stéphane Robert	7	6
2	(Spain) David Ferrer	5	4

Final
3	(Spain) Feliciano López	7	6
8	(France) Stéphane Robert	5	1

=== Top half ===
First round
1	(France) G Monfils	6	6
(Slovakia) D Hrbatý	2	1
(Israel) H Levy	6^{4}	2
(France) J Ouanna	7^{7}	6
WC	(South Africa) R Klaasen	6	6
(France) D Guez	4	3
(Finland) J Nieminen	3	2
7	(Chinese Taipei) Y-h Lu	6	6
3	(Spain) F López	6	6^{5}	6
Q	(Monaco) B Balleret	1	7^{7}	3
(Slovenia) B Kavčič	1	7	6
(France) T Ascione	6	5	3
Q	(South Africa) F Wolmarans	4	5
(Germany) B Phau	6	7
WC	(South Africa) R de Voest	7^{7}	3	3
5	(United States) R Ram	6^{3}	6	6

Second round
1	(France) G Monfils	6	7
(France) J Ouanna	4	5
WC	(South Africa) R Klaasen	4	5
7	(Chinese Taipei) Y-h Lu	6	7
3	(Spain) F López	6	7^{7}
(Slovenia) B Kavčič	2	6^{4}
(Germany) B Phau	6^{10}	6^{2}
5	(United States) R Ram	7^{12}	7^{7}

Quarterfinals
1	(France) G Monfils	6	6
7	(Chinese Taipei) Y-h Lu	1	4
3	(Spain) F López	7^{7}	6
5	(United States) R Ram	6^{2}	3

Semifinals
1	(France) G Monfils	6	1	6^{1}
3	(Spain) F López	3	6	7^{7}

=== Bottom half ===
First round
8	(France) S Robert	3	6	6
(United States) B Evans	6	2	2
WC	(South Africa) I van der Merwe	7^{7}	7^{7}
Q	(Israel) N Okun	6^{5}	6^{2}
(Belgium) S Darcis	6	3	4
(France) L Recouderc	3	6	6
(Jamaica) D Brown	6	3	6
4	(Switzerland) M Chiudinelli	4	6	4
6	(Belgium) X Malisse	4	2
(India) S Devvarman	6	6
(Brazil) T Alves	5	6	6
(Ukraine) O Dolgopolov Jr.	7	2	3
Q	(Sweden) F Prpic	6	7
(Spain) I Navarro	3	5
(Slovakia) K Beck	1	5
2	(Spain) D Ferrer	6	7

Second round
8	(France) S Robert	7^{9}	6
WC	(South Africa) I van der Merwe	6^{7}	1
(France) L Recouderc	4	4
(Jamaica) D Brown	6	6
(India) S Devvarman	6	6
(Brazil) T Alves	4	1
Q	(Sweden) F Prpic	3	4
2	(Spain) D Ferrer	6	6

Quarterfinals
8	(France) S Robert	7^{7}	6
(Jamaica) D Brown	6^{5}	3
(India) S Devvarman	1	3
2	(Spain) D Ferrer	6	6

Semifinals
8	(France) S Robert	7	6
2	(Spain) D Ferrer	5	4

== Qualifying ==
All seeded players received a bye into the second round, and all players playing in the fourth qualifier received a bye into the second round.

=== Seeds ===
1. (France) Édouard Roger-Vasselin (qualifying competition)
2. (Austria) Andreas Haider-Maurer (qualifying competition)
3. (India) Prakash Amritraj (second round)
4. (Monaco) Benjamin Balleret (qualified)
5. (Israel) Noam Okun (qualified)
6. (Sweden) Filip Prpic (qualified)
7. (Switzerland) Alexander Sadecky (qualifying competition)
8. (South Africa) Fritz Wolmarans (qualified)

=== Qualifiers ===
1. (South Africa) Fritz Wolmarans
2. (Sweden) Filip Prpic
3. (Israel) Noam Okun
4. (Monaco) Benjamin Balleret

=== Draw ===
==== First qualifier ====
First round				Second round				Qualifying competition
				1	(France) Édouard Roger-Vasselin	6	6
(India) Rohan Bopanna	3	5			(South Africa) Benjamin Janse van Rensburg	2	2
(South Africa) Benjamin Janse van Rensburg	6	7						1	(France) Édouard Roger-Vasselin	6	2	2
(South Africa) Nicolaas Scholtz	7^{7}	2	5					8	(South Africa) Fritz Wolmarans	4	6	6
(United States) Eric Butorac	6^{4}	6	7		(United States) Eric Butorac
				8	(South Africa) Fritz Wolmarans	w/o

==== Second qualifier ====
First round			Second round				Qualifying competition
			2	(Austria) Andreas Haider-Maurer	6	6
(South Africa) Ruan Roelofse	7^{7}	7^{7}		(South Africa) Ruan Roelofse	3	1
(South Africa) Hendrik Coertzen	6^{4}	6^{4}					2	(Austria) Andreas Haider-Maurer	1	3
(Switzerland) George Bastl	6	6					6	(Sweden) Filip Prpic	6	6
(United States) James Cerretani	4	0		(Switzerland) George Bastl	2	2
			6	(Sweden) Filip Prpic	6	6

==== Third qualifier ====
First round				Second round				Qualifying competition
				3	(India) Prakash Amritraj	4	1
(Switzerland) Roman Valent	6	6			(Switzerland) Roman Valent	6	6
(Zimbabwe) Kevin Ullyett	2	1							(Switzerland) Roman Valent	3	5
(South Africa) Andrew Anderson	6	4	3					5	(Israel) Noam Okun	6	7
(United Kingdom) Chris Eaton	3	6	6		(United Kingdom) Chris Eaton	3	2
				5	(Israel) Noam Okun	6	6

==== Fourth qualifier ====
First round					Second round				Qualifying competition
					4	(Monaco) Benjamin Balleret	6	6
	(South Africa) Jeff Coetzee	3				(South Africa) Jeff Coetzee	3	4
WC	(Netherlands) Rogier Wassen	0^{r}							4	(Monaco) Benjamin Balleret	6	7^{8}
(Switzerland) Yves Allegro		5	7^{7}	2					7	(Switzerland) Alexander Sadecky	4	6^{6}
(Pakistan) Aisam-ul-Haq Qureshi		7	6^{3}	6		(Pakistan) Aisam-ul-Haq Qureshi	6^{5}	4
					7	(Switzerland) Alexander Sadecky	7^{7}	6
