= 2011 SA Tennis Open – Singles =

Singles
- 2011 SA Tennis Open

Final
- Champion: (South Africa) Kevin Anderson
- Runner-up: (India) Somdev Devvarman
- Score: 4–6, 6–3, 6–2

Events
| Singles | Doubles |
| ← 2010 · | SA Tennis Open |

Feliciano López was the defending champion, but lost to Frank Dancevic in the first round.
Kevin Anderson won this tournament. He defeated Somdev Devvarman 4–6, 6–3, 6–2 in the final.

== Seeds ==
1. (Spain) Feliciano López (first round)
2. (Chinese Taipei) Lu Yen-hsun (first round)
3. (Serbia) Janko Tipsarević (first round)
4. (South Africa) Kevin Anderson (champion)
5. (France) Florent Serra (first round)
6. (France) Adrian Mannarino (semifinals)
7. (Germany) Rainer Schüttler (first round)
8. (Poland) Michał Przysiężny (second round)

== Draw ==
=== Key ===
- Q = Qualifier
- WC = Wild card
- LL = Lucky loser
- Alt = Alternate
- SE = Special exempt
- PR = Protected ranking
- ITF = ITF entry
- JE = Junior exempt
- w/o = Walkover
- r = Retired
- d = Defaulted
- SR = Special ranking

=== Finals ===
Semifinals
6 | (France) Adrian Mannarino | 7^{7} | 0 | 4
4 | (South Africa) Kevin Anderson | 6^{3} | 6 | 6
(India) Somdev Devvarman | 6 | 6
WC | (South Africa) Izak van der Merwe | 2 | 4

Final
4 | (South Africa) Kevin Anderson | 4 | 6 | 6
(India) Somdev Devvarman | 6 | 3 | 2

=== Top half ===
First round
1 | (Spain) F López | 7^{7} | 2 | 6^{8}
(Canada) F Dancevic | 6^{5} | 6 | 7^{10}
(Netherlands) I Sijsling | 6 | 3 | 4
WC | (South Africa) F Wolmarans | 4 | 6 | 6
Q | (South Africa) N Scholtz | 4 | 5
(Germany) D Gremelmayr | 6 | 7
(Kazakhstan) Y Schukin | 6^{4} | 6^{6}
6 | (France) A Mannarino | 7^{7} | 7^{8}
4 | (South Africa) K Anderson | 4 | 6 | 6
(Switzerland) S Bohli | 6 | 4 | 2
(France) É Roger-Vasselin | 6 | 5 | 4
(Israel) D Sela | 1 | 7 | 6
(Argentina) B Dabul | 5 | 6^{4}
(Slovakia) K Beck | 7 | 7^{7}
(Japan) G Soeda | 3 | 6 | 6
7 | (Germany) R Schüttler | 6 | 4 | 4

Second round
(Canada) F Dancevic | 7^{7} | 6
WC | (South Africa) F Wolmarans | 6^{4} | 3
(Germany) D Gremelmayr | 7^{7} | 4 | 4
6 | (France) A Mannarino | 6^{2} | 6 | 6
4 | (South Africa) K Anderson | 6 | 6
(Israel) D Sela | 2 | 4
(Slovakia) K Beck | 3 | 7 | 6
(Japan) G Soeda | 6 | 5 | 0

Quarterfinals
(Canada) F Dancevic | 3 | 2
6 | (France) A Mannarino | 6 | 6
4 | (South Africa) K Anderson | 6 | 6
(Slovakia) K Beck | 3 | 1

Semifinals
6 | (France) A Mannarino | 7^{7} | 0 | 4
4 | (South Africa) K Anderson | 6^{3} | 6 | 6

=== Bottom half ===
First round
8 | (Poland) M Przysiężny | 6 | 6
(Austria) M Fischer | 1 | 2
Q | (Italy) S Galvani | 3 | 7 | 6^{6}
WC | (South Africa) R de Voest | 6 | 5 | 7^{8}
(India) S Devvarman | 6 | 6
Q | (South Africa) R Klaasen | 4 | 3
(Netherlands) J Huta Galung | 6^{4} | 6 | 7^{7}
3 | (Serbia) J Tipsarević | 7^{7} | 4 | 6^{4}
5 | (France) F Serra | 4 | 4
(Germany) D Brown | 6 | 6
WC | (South Africa) I van der Merwe | 6 | 6
(France) S Robert | 3 | 2
LL | (Brazil) T Alves | 2 | 5
(Germany) S Greul | 6 | 7
Q | (Canada) M Raonic | 6 | 6
2 | (Chinese Taipei) Y-h Lu | 3 | 3

Second round
8 | (Poland) M Przysiężny | 3 | 4
WC | (South Africa) R de Voest | 6 | 6
(India) S Devvarman | 6 | 6
(Netherlands) J Huta Galung | 3 | 4
(Germany) D Brown | 6 | 5 | 3
WC | (South Africa) I van der Merwe | 4 | 7 | 6
(Germany) S Greul | 7^{7} | 6
Q | (Canada) M Raonic | 6^{5} | 4

Quarterfinals
WC | (South Africa) R de Voest | 6 | 6^{5} | 1
(India) S Devvarman | 3 | 7^{7} | 6
WC | (South Africa) I van der Merwe | 7^{7} | 6
(Germany) S Greul | 6^{5} | 2

Semifinals
(India) S Devvarman | 6 | 6
WC | (South Africa) I van der Merwe | 2 | 4
