= 2011 SA Tennis Open – Doubles =

Doubles
- 2011 SA Tennis Open

Final
- Champions: (United States) James Cerretani (Canada) Adil Shamasdin
- Runners-up: (United States) Scott Lipsky (United States) Rajeev Ram
- Score: 6–3, 3–6, [10–7]

Events
Singles	Doubles
← 2010 ·	SA Tennis Open

Rohan Bopanna and Aisam-ul-Haq Qureshi were the defending champions, but decided not to participate.
James Cerretani and Adil Shamasdin won this tournament, by defeating top seeded Scott Lipsky and Rajeev Ram in the final, 6–3, 3–6, [10–7].

== Seeds ==
1. (United States) Scott Lipsky / (United States) Rajeev Ram (final)
2. (Germany) Dustin Brown / (Netherlands) Rogier Wassen (first round)
3. (Sweden) Johan Brunström / (United Kingdom) Ken Skupski (first round)
4. (United Kingdom) Jamie Murray / (Austria) Alexander Peya (semifinals)

== Draw ==
=== Key ===
- Q = Qualifier
- WC = Wild card
- LL = Lucky loser
- Alt = Alternate
- SE = Special exempt
- PR = Protected ranking
- ITF = ITF entry
- JE = Junior exempt
- w/o = Walkover
- r = Retired
- d = Defaulted
- SR = Special ranking

=== Draw ===
First round
1	(United States) S Lipsky (United States) R Ram	6	3	[10]
(Thailand) Sa Ratiwatana (Thailand) So Ratiwatana	1	6	[8]
(Austria) P Oswald (Austria) M Slanar	1	2
WC	(South Africa) R de Voest (South Africa) I van der Merwe	6	6
4	(United Kingdom) J Murray (Austria) A Peya	2	6	[10]
(Australia) A Fisher (Australia) J Kerr	6	2	[7]
(France) A Mannarino (France) F Serra	3	0
(Chinese Taipei) Y-h Lu (Serbia) J Tipsarević	6	6
(United States) J Cerretani (Canada) A Shamasdin	7^{7}	6
WC	(South Africa) K Anderson (South Africa) F Wolmarans	6^{1}	4
(Poland) T Bednarek (Poland) M Przysiężny	7	4	[10]
3	(Sweden) J Brunström (United Kingdom) K Skupski	5	6	[8]
(Austria) M Fischer (Germany) R Schüttler	3	4
(India) S Devvarman (United States) D Martin	6	6
(Slovakia) K Beck (Israel) D Sela	6	7
2	(Germany) D Brown (Netherlands) R Wassen	3	5

Quarterfinals
1	(United States) S Lipsky (United States) R Ram	7^{7}	6
WC	(South Africa) R de Voest (South Africa) I van der Merwe	6^{5}	3
4	(United Kingdom) J Murray (Austria) A Peya	6	6
(Chinese Taipei) Y-h Lu (Serbia) J Tipsarević	3	4
(United States) J Cerretani (Canada) A Shamasdin	6	6
(Poland) T Bednarek (Poland) M Przysiężny	1	3
(India) S Devvarman (United States) D Martin	7^{7}	3	[10]
(Slovakia) K Beck (Israel) D Sela	6^{1}	6	[12]

Semifinals
1	(United States) S Lipsky (United States) R Ram	7	7^{7}
4	(United Kingdom) J Murray (Austria) A Peya	5	6^{2}
(United States) J Cerretani (Canada) A Shamasdin	7^{7}	6
(Slovakia) K Beck (Israel) D Sela	6^{4}	4

Final
1	(United States) S Lipsky (United States) R Ram	3	6	[7]
(United States) J Cerretani (Canada) A Shamasdin	6	3	[10]
