= 2010 SA Tennis Open – Doubles =

Doubles
- 2010 SA Tennis Open

Final
- Champions: (India) Rohan Bopanna (Pakistan) Aisam-ul-Haq Qureshi
- Runners-up: (Slovakia) Karol Beck (Israel) Harel Levy
- Score: 6–2, 3–6, [10–5]

Events
Singles	Doubles
← 2009 ·	SA Tennis Open	· 2011 →

James Cerretani and Dick Norman were the defending doubles champions at the SA Tennis Open tournament, but Norman chose to not participate this year. Cerretani partnered up with Prakash Amritraj, but they lost in the first round 4–6, 6–7^{(6–8)}, against Eric Butorac and Rajeev Ram.

Rohan Bopanna and Aisam-ul-Haq Qureshi won in the final 6–2, 3–6, [10–5], against Karol Beck and Harel Levy. This was Qureshi's first ATP tour title.

== Seeds ==
1. (South Africa) Wesley Moodie / (Zimbabwe) Kevin Ullyett (first round)
2. (Sweden) Johan Brunström / (Netherlands Antilles) Jean-Julien Rojer (quarterfinals, defaulted)
3. (United States) Eric Butorac / (United States) Rajeev Ram (semifinals)
4. (South Africa) Jeff Coetzee / (Netherlands) Rogier Wassen (first round)

== Draw ==
=== Key ===
- Q = Qualifier
- WC = Wild card
- LL = Lucky loser
- Alt = Alternate
- ITF = ITF entry
- PR = Protected ranking
- SR = Special ranking
- SE = Special exempt
- JE = Junior exempt
- JR = Junior Accelerator Programme entrant
- CO = College Accelerator Programme entrant
- NG = Next Gen Accelerator Program entrant
- w/o = Walkover
- r = Retired
- d = Defaulted

=== Draw ===
First round
1	(South Africa) W Moodie (Zimbabwe) K Ullyett	6^{2}	6^{3}
(Belgium) S Darcis (Belgium) X Malisse	7^{7}	7^{7}
(France) L Recouderc (France) S Robert	2	2
(Thailand) Sa Ratiwatana (Thailand) So Ratiwatana	6	6
4	(South Africa) J Coetzee (Netherlands) R Wassen	6	2	[8]
WC	(South Africa) R Klaasen (South Africa) I van der Merwe	4	6	[10]
(Slovakia) K Beck (Israel) H Levy	5	6	[10]
(Poland) T Bednarek (Poland) M Kowalczyk	7	4	[7]
WC	(South Africa) R Roelofse (South Africa) N Scholtz	4	1
(India) P Amritraj (United States) J Cerretani	6	6
(Germany) P Marx (Slovakia) I Zelenay	6^{6}	3
3	(United States) E Butorac (United States) R Ram	7^{8}	6
(India) R Bopanna (Pakistan) A-u-H Qureshi	4	6	[10]
(Switzerland) Y Allegro (Switzerland) M Chiudinelli	6	3	[5]
(South Africa) R de Voest (Chinese Taipei) Y-h Lu	3	4
2	(Sweden) J Brunström (Netherlands Antilles) J-J Rojer	6	6

Quarterfinals
(Belgium) S Darcis (Belgium) X Malisse	3	6	[10]
(Thailand) Sa Ratiwatana (Thailand) So Ratiwatana	6	4	[8]
WC	(South Africa) R Klaasen (South Africa) I van der Merwe	4	6	[8]
(Slovakia) K Beck (Israel) H Levy	6	2	[10]
(India) P Amritraj (United States) J Cerretani	4	6^{6}
3	(United States) E Butorac (United States) R Ram	6	7^{8}
(India) R Bopanna (Pakistan) A-u-H Qureshi	3	6	[9]
2	(Sweden) J Brunström (Netherlands Antilles) J-J Rojer	6	3	[9^{d}]

Semifinals
(Belgium) S Darcis (Belgium) X Malisse	5	6	[7]
(Slovakia) K Beck (Israel) H Levy	7	4	[10]
3	(United States) E Butorac (United States) R Ram	6^{5}	4
(India) R Bopanna (Pakistan) A-u-H Qureshi	7^{7}	6

Final
(Slovakia) K Beck (Israel) H Levy	6	3	[5]
(India) R Bopanna (Pakistan) A-u-H Qureshi	2	6	[10]
