= 2011 SA Tennis Open – Singles qualifying =

This article displays the qualifying draw of the 2011 SA Tennis Open.

== Players ==
=== Seeds ===
1. (Canada) Milos Raonic (qualified)
2. (Brazil) Thiago Alves (qualifying competition, lucky loser)
3. (United States) Rajeev Ram (qualifying competition)
4. (Italy) Stefano Galvani (qualified)
5. (South Africa) Raven Klaasen (qualified)
6. (Israel) Harel Levy (qualifying competition)
7. (Austria) Philipp Oswald (qualifying competition)
8. (Canada) Pierre-Ludovic Duclos (second round)

=== Qualifiers ===
1. (Canada) Milos Raonic
2. (South Africa) Nikala Scholtz
3. (South Africa) Raven Klaasen
4. (Italy) Stefano Galvani

=== Lucky losers ===
1. (Brazil) Thiago Alves

== Qualifying draw ==
=== First qualifier ===
First round
1	(Canada) Milos Raonic	2	6	6
(Poland) Tomasz Bednarek	6	0	4
(South Africa) Steffen Solomon	2	1
6	(Israel) Harel Levy	6	6

Qualifying competition
1	(Canada) Milos Raonic	6	6
6	(Israel) Harel Levy	2	1

=== Second qualifier ===
First round					Second round					Qualifying competition
					2	(Brazil) Thiago Alves	5	7	6
WC	(Australia) Ashley Fisher	4	2			(Netherlands) Rogier Wassen	7	5	0
	(Netherlands) Rogier Wassen	6	6							2	(Brazil) Thiago Alves	3	1
	(South Africa) Ruan Roelofse	5	6	6^{3}							(South Africa) Nikala Scholtz	6	6
	(South Africa) Nikala Scholtz	7	4	7^{7}		(South Africa) Nikala Scholtz	7^{7}	6
					8	(Canada) Pierre-Ludovic Duclos	6^{2}	3

=== Third qualifier ===
First round
3	(United States) Rajeev Ram	6	6
(Zimbabwe) Mark Fynn	0	1
(Australia) Jordan Kerr	2	3
5	(South Africa) Raven Klaasen	6	6

Qualifying competition
3	(United States) Rajeev Ram	1	5
5	(South Africa) Raven Klaasen	6	7

=== Fourth qualifier ===
First round
4	(Italy) Stefano Galvani	6	6
(Germany) David Thurner	2	4
(Germany) Jaan-Frederik Brunken	3	6^{5}
7	(Austria) Philipp Oswald	6	7^{7}

Qualifying competition
4	(Italy) Stefano Galvani	6	6
7	(Austria) Philipp Oswald	1	3
