= 2010 SA Tennis Open =

- Date: 1–7 February
- Edition: 2nd
- Category: World Tour 250
- Surface: Hard / indoors
- Location: Johannesburg, South Africa

Champions

Singles
- (Spain) Feliciano López

Doubles
- (India) Rohan Bopanna / (Pakistan) Aisam-ul-Haq Qureshi
- SA Tennis Open

The 2010 SA Tennis Open was a tennis tournament played on hard courts indoors. It was the 2nd edition of the SA Tennis Open and was part of the ATP World Tour 250 series of the 2010 ATP World Tour. It took place in Johannesburg, South Africa from 1 February through 7 February 2010.

== ATP entrants ==
=== Seeds ===
Country	Player	Rank^{1}	Seed
FRA	Gaël Monfils	12	1
ESP	David Ferrer	18	2
ESP	Feliciano López	46	3
SUI	Marco Chiudinelli	58	4
USA	Rajeev Ram	84	5
BEL	Xavier Malisse	93	6
TPE	Lu Yen-hsun	101	7
FRA	Stéphane Robert	104	8

- Rankings are as of 18 January 2010

=== Other entrants ===
The following players received wildcards into the singles main draw:

- (South Africa) Rik de Voest
- (South Africa) Raven Klaasen
- (South Africa) Izak van der Merwe

The following players received entry from the qualifying draw:

- (Monaco) Benjamin Balleret
- (Israel) Noam Okun
- (Sweden) Filip Prpic
- (South Africa) Fritz Wolmarans

== Finals ==
=== Singles ===
(Spain) Feliciano López defeated (France) Stéphane Robert, 7–5, 6–1

- It was Lopez's first title of the year and second of his career.

=== Doubles ===
(India) Rohan Bopanna / (Pakistan) Aisam-ul-Haq Qureshi defeated (Slovakia) Karol Beck / (Israel) Harel Levy 6–2, 3–6, [10–5]
