= 2011 SA Tennis Open =

- Date: 30 January – 6 February
- Edition: 3rd
- Category: ATP World Tour 250
- Location: Johannesburg, South Africa

Champions

Singles
- (South Africa) Kevin Anderson

Doubles
- (United States) James Cerretani / (Canada) Adil Shamasdin
- SA Tennis Open

The 2011 SA Tennis Open was a men's tennis tournament to be played on hard courts indoors. It was the 3rd edition of the SA Tennis Open and was part of the ATP World Tour 250 series of the 2011 ATP World Tour. It took place in Johannesburg, South Africa from 30 January through 6 February 2011.

== Finals ==
=== Singles ===
(South Africa) Kevin Anderson defeated (India) Somdev Devvarman, 4–6, 6–3, 6–2

- It was Anderson's first career title.

=== Doubles ===
(United States) James Cerretani / (Canada) Adil Shamasdin defeated (United States) Scott Lipsky / (United States) Rajeev Ram, 6–3, 3–6, [10–7]

== Entrants ==
=== Seeds ===
Country	Player	Rank^{1}	Seed
ESP	Feliciano López	31	1
TPE	Lu Yen-hsun	37	2
SRB	Janko Tipsarević	49	3
RSA	Kevin Anderson	56	4
FRA	Florent Serra	69	5
FRA	Adrian Mannarino	74	6
GER	Rainer Schüttler	83	7
POL	Michał Przysiężny	84	8

- Rankings are as of 17 January 2011.

=== Other entrants ===
The following players received wildcards into the singles main draw:

- (South Africa) Rik de Voest
- (South Africa) Izak van der Merwe
- (South Africa) Fritz Wolmarans

The following players received entry from the qualifying draw:

- (Italy) Stefano Galvani
- (South Africa) Raven Klaasen
- (Canada) Milos Raonic
- (South Africa) Nikala Scholtz
