= Somdev Devvarman =

Indian tennis player

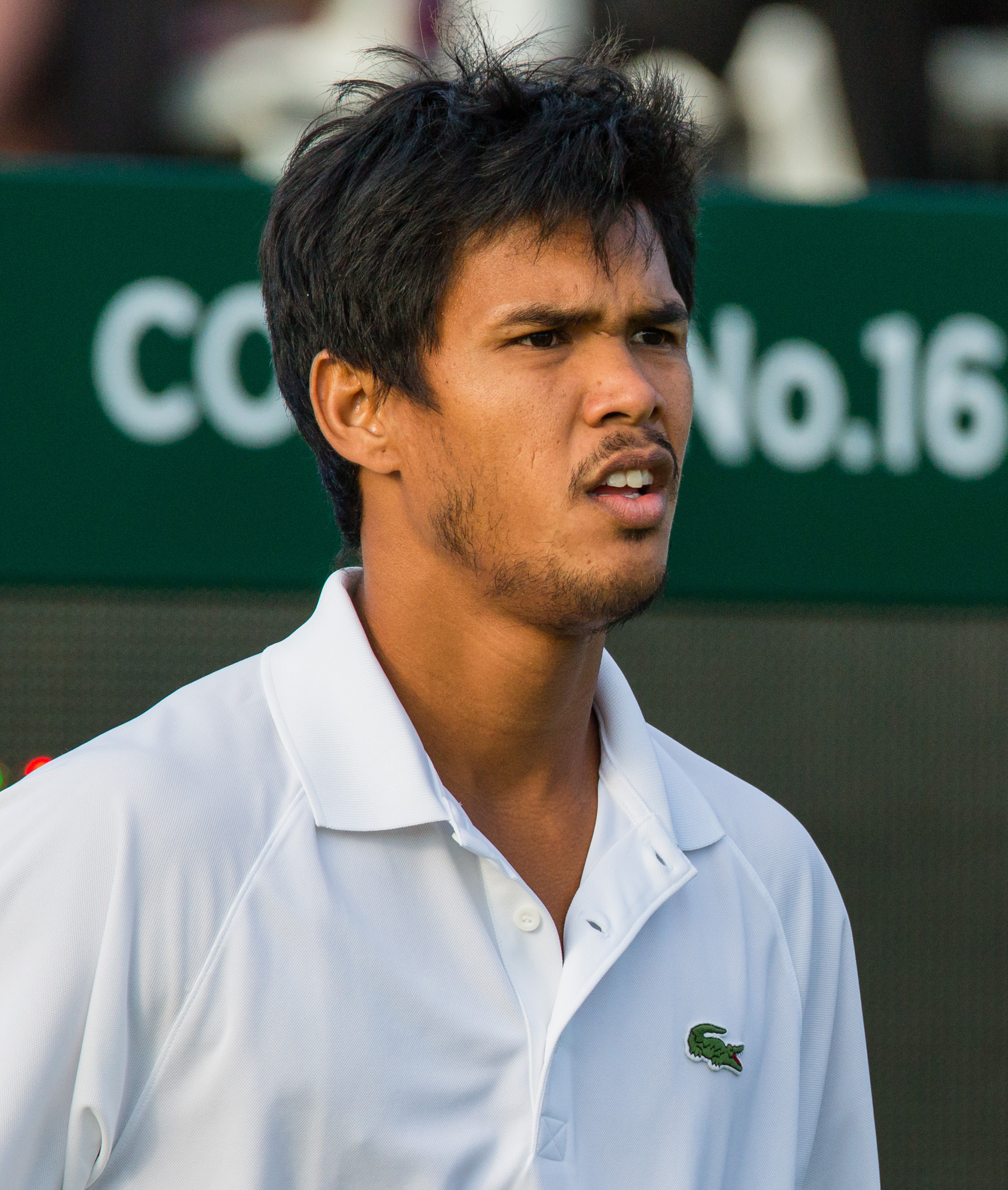
- Devvarman at the 2015 Wimbledon Qualifying
- Full name: Somdev Kishore Devvarman
- Country (sports): India
- Residence: Charlottesville, Virginia, U.S.
- Born: 13 February 1985 (age 41) Agartala, Tripura, India
- Height: 1.80 m (5 ft 11 in)
- Turned pro: 2008
- Retired: 2017 (last match 2016)
- Plays: Right-handed (two-handed backhand)
- College: University of Virginia
- Prize money: $1,459,122

Singles
- Career record: 62–81
- Career titles: 0
- Highest ranking: No. 62 (25 July 2011)

Grand Slam singles results
- Australian Open: 2R (2013)
- French Open: 2R (2013)
- Wimbledon: 2R (2011)
- US Open: 2R (2009, 2013)

Other tournaments
- Olympic Games: 1R (2012)

Doubles
- Career record: 19–26
- Career titles: 0
- Highest ranking: No. 139 (31 October 2011)

Grand Slam doubles results
- Australian Open: 2R (2010)
- French Open: 1R (2011)
- Wimbledon: 2R (2011)
- US Open: 3R (2011)

Team competitions
- Davis Cup: 1R (2010)
- Last updated on: 2 January 2017.

Somdev Devvarman
Medal record

Representing India

Men's Tennis

Commonwealth Games
Gold medal – first place	2010 Delhi	Singles

Asian Games
Gold medal – first place	2010 Guangzhou	Singles
Gold medal – first place	2010 Guangzhou	Doubles
Bronze medal – third place	2010 Guangzhou	Team

Somdev Kishore Devvarman (born 13 February 1985) is an Indian former professional tennis player. He is known for being one of the few collegiate players to have made three consecutive finals at the NCAA, winning back-to-back finals in his junior and senior years at the University of Virginia. Only three other players have matched that record since 1950. His 44–1 win–loss record in 2008 at the NCAA Men's Tennis Championship was the best record since 1971.

His best achievement on the ATP World Tour was reaching the final of the Chennai Open in 2009, as a wild card entry. In 2010, Somdev won the gold medal in the men's singles event of XIXth Commonwealth Games at the R.K. Khanna Tennis Stadium in New Delhi, and he followed it up with both men's singles and doubles gold in the 2010 Asian Games in Guangzhou, China. He was coached by Scott McCain.

In 2011, Devvarman received the Arjuna Award from the Indian government for his tennis successes. In March 2017, the Ministry of Youth Affairs and Sports, Government of India, appointed him as the national observer for tennis. In 2018, he was awarded with the civilian award Padma Shri.

== Early life ==
Somdev was born into a Tripuri Hindu family in Guwahati, Assam to Ranjana and Pravanjan Dev Varman, a retired income tax commissioner. He belongs to the Indian state of Tripura. His family moved to Calcutta when he was 3 to 4 months old and stayed there until he was 8. His father's work took the family to Madras (Chennai) where Somdev grew up, beginning tennis at age 9, and studied at Madras Christian College Higher Secondary School. Devvarman started competing in Futures tournaments in 2002 at the age of 17. His biggest achievement during this time was a victory in the Kolkata F2 championship in 2004, after which he rose to 666 in the world rankings. He moved to the USA later that year and competed less regularly while at the University of Virginia. Somdev, while at college, won the 2007 NCAA Singles Championship by defeating Georgia Bulldog's senior, the top seed John Isner in the final. A year later, he defeated Tennessee's J.P. Smith to win his second consecutive NCAA Singles National Championship. Devvarman becomes the 13th player in the 124-year history of the tournament to win consecutive titles, and just the fourth to do so in the past 50 years with an unprecedented 44–1 record in 2008. Somdev finished university with a degree in sociology and turned pro in the summer of 2008. He won his first career title that year at a Futures tournament in Rochester, New York. The University of Virginia retired Devvarman's jersey in 2009. At the end of 2010, he was felicitated by the Tamil Nadu Tennis Association in Chennai.

== Professional results ==
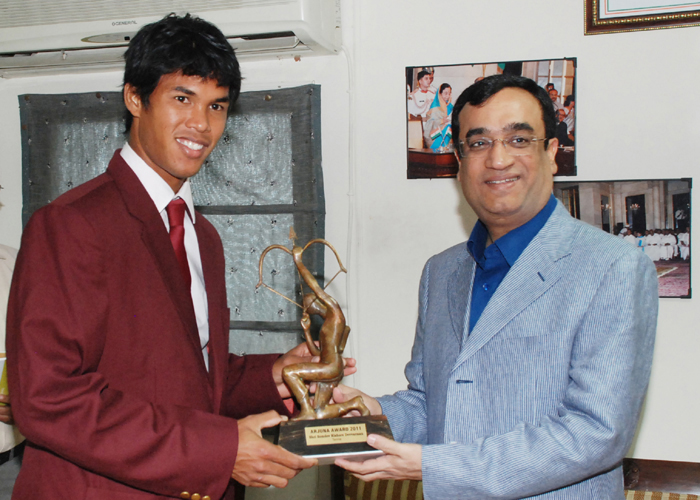
The Minister of State (Independent Charge) for Youth Affairs and Sports, Ajay Maken presenting the Arjuna Award for the year 2011 to Somdev Kishore Devvarman, in New Delhi on 20 September 2011

=== Early career ===
After graduating from the University of Virginia, Devvarman started his professional career at the Futures tournament in Rochester, New York, where he won the singles title. He and his former university partner, Treat Huey, won the doubles title. The next week at another Futures match in Pittsburgh, Devvarman and Huey won the doubles title, and Devvarman the singles.

Devvarman made the final of the Kennedy Funding Invitational in New York in July 2007. In a clay-court non-tour event which included several players ranked in the top 150, Devvarman defeated Ricardo Mello, Robert Kendrick, and Justin Gimelstob, before losing a three-set match to No. 69 Michael Russell in the final. He returned and won the tournament in 2008, beating Sam Querrey and Dudi Sela along the way.

On 27 July 2008, Devvarman won the Lexington Challenger, first coming through qualifying, and then beating players including Bobby Reynolds, Xavier Malisse, and Robert Kendrick to take the title. He received automatic entry into the Vancouver Open and reached the quarterfinals, before his first professional defeat, by Go Soeda.

In August 2008, Devvarman made the quarterfinals of the Legg Mason Tennis Classic, first beating Sam Warburg, Jamie Baker, and Soeda to qualify, and then beating Taylor Dent and Robert Kendrick in the main draw, before losing to Russian Igor Kunitsyn.

At the BCR Bucharest Open, Devvarman lost to world No. 18 Nicolás Almagro after winning the first set in the first round, having beaten No. 93 Italian Filippo Volandri in the final round of qualifying. Devvarman ended 2008 ranked as world No. 204. He had started the year at No. 1033.

=== 2009: First ATP final ===
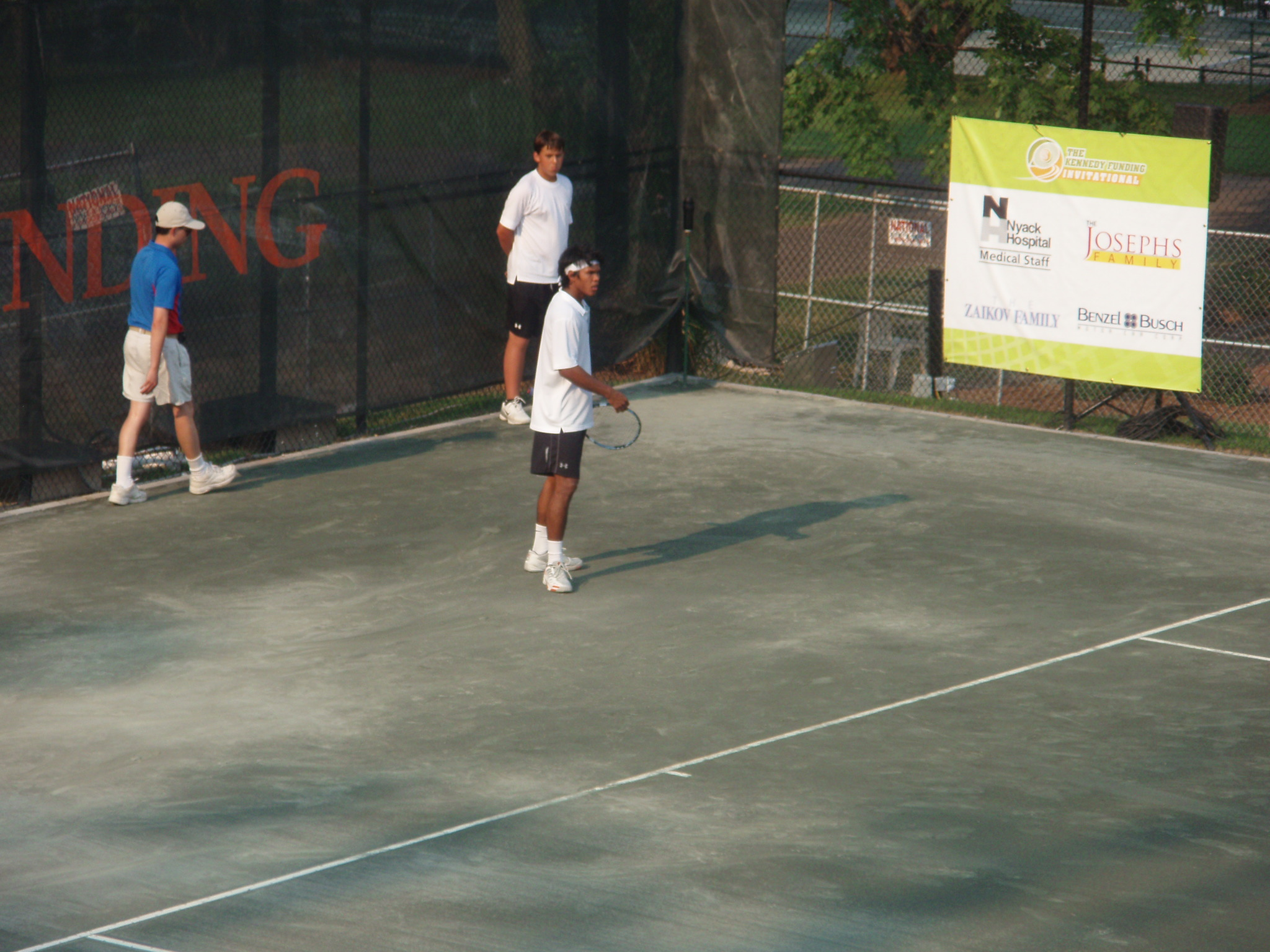
Somdev Devvarman in New York

Devvarman reached his first ATP Tour final at the 2009 Chennai Open, the first tournament of the new season, beating two-time Chennai Open champion and world No. 42 Carlos Moyá of Spain and No. 25 Ivo Karlović of Croatia. Rainer Schüttler of Germany pulled out due to injury in the semifinals, meaning that Devvarman progressed to the final. In the final, he lost to Marin Čilić of Croatia.

At the year's first Grand Slam, the Australian Open, Somdev was seeded 28th in singles qualifying. He beat Prakash Amritraj in his first qualifying round; then lost to unseeded Łukasz Kubot of Poland in the second round. After some poor results in qualifying and Challenger tournaments, Somdev had a successful Davis Cup campaign, winning both his matches against Chinese Taipei, including a critical reverse singles match against world No. 59 Yen-Hsun Lu to lead India to victory.

In the second Grand Slam of 2009, the French Open, Devvarman was seeded 26th in singles qualifying. He defeated João Souza of Brazil in the first round and ousted Brit Alex Bogdanovic before losing to third seed and world No. 96 Marcos Daniel. At the third Grand Slam of the year, Wimbledon, Somdev, seeded 14th in qualifying, failed to advance to the singles draw, losing in the first round to Jean-Rene Lisnard of Monaco. In doubles, Devvarman and partner Kevin Anderson advanced to the main draw, but lost to the fourth-seeded pair Mahesh Bhupathi and Mark Knowles.

Devvarman had poor clay- and grass-court seasons, but was more successful upon return to hard courts, reaching the semifinals of the Comerica Bank Challenger. He then caused a major upset in the Legg Mason Tennis Classic, avenging his defeat in the Chennai Open against Marin Čilić. After beating Poland's Jerzy Janowicz, Devvarman became the first Indian in the main draw of a Grand Slam singles tournament since Prakash Amritraj in 2002.

In the US Open, Devvarman beat Janowicz to qualify for his first Grand Slam singles main draw. He beat Frederico Gil in the first round. In the second round, he lost to 24th seed Philipp Kohlschreiber of Germany.

=== 2010 ===
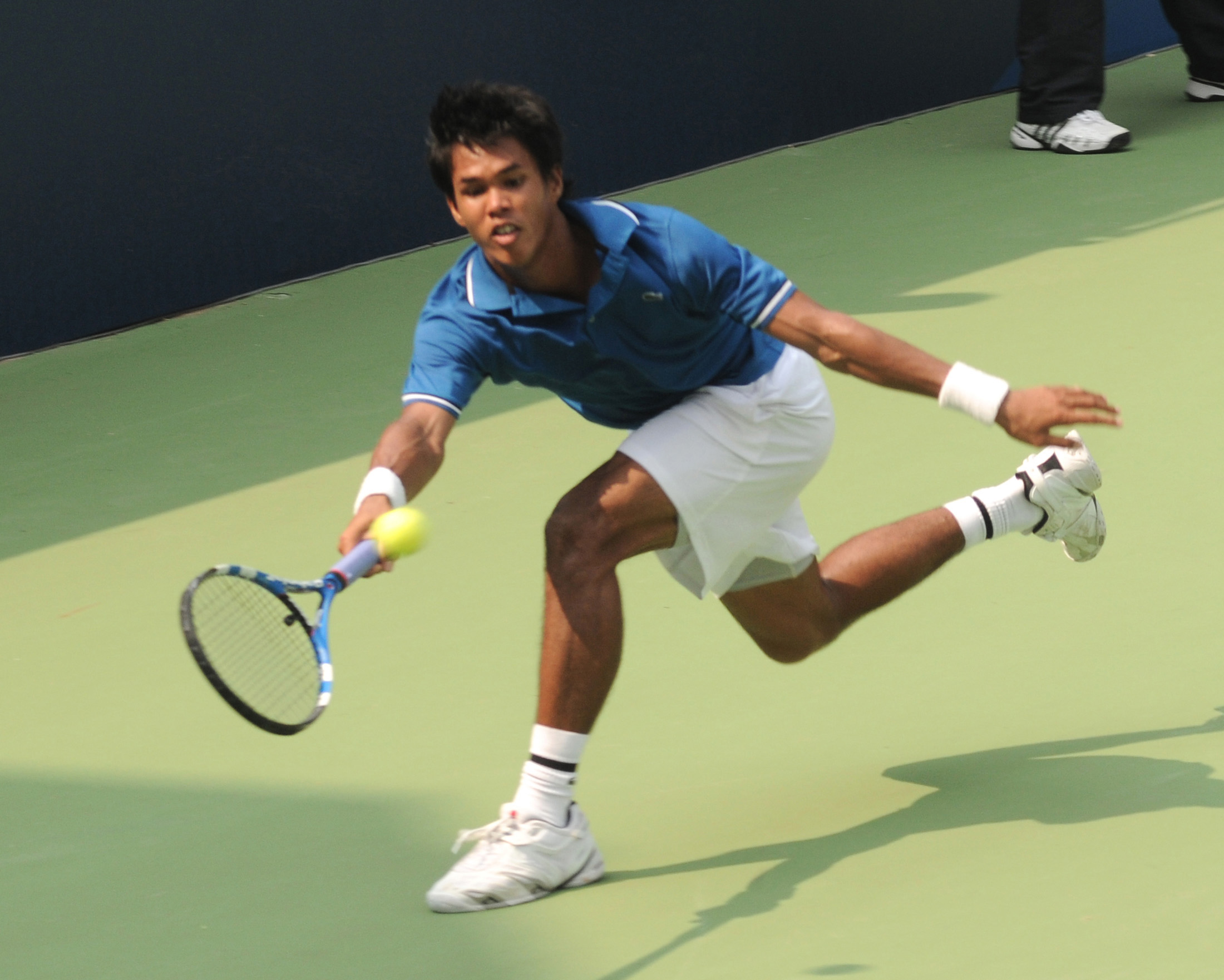
XIX Commonwealth Games-2010 Delhi Somdev Devvarman in action against Amresh Jayawickreme of Sri Lanka, at R.K. Khanna Tennis Stadium, in New Delhi on 6 October 2010

Devvarman reached the quarterfinals of the SA Open in Johannesburg. He also reached the second round of the ATP World Tour 500 series Dubai Tennis Championships, where he lost against Marcos Baghdatis. He also led India's Davis Cup team in their match against Russia.

Somdev qualified for the 2010 French Open and lost to Switzerland's Marco Chiudinelli in the first round. He achieved direct entry to the 2010 US Open, where he lost to Kevin Anderson in the first round. Somdev competed at Wimbledon in the doubles draw with former UVA teammate, Treat Huey, where they lost to Rohan Bopanna and Aisam-ul-Haq Qureshi.

On 10 October 2010, Somdev won the men's tennis gold medal in the Commonwealth Games 2010 at Delhi by beating Greg Jones of Australia in straight sets. On 23 November 2010, Somdev also won the singles gold medal in the 2010 Asian Games at Guangzhou, China by beating Denis Istomin of Uzbekistan in straight sets. The day before, he had teamed up with Sanam Singh to win the gold in the doubles event. However, because tennis at both the Commonwealth Games and the Asian Games are not ATP tour events, Somdev did not gain any ATP ranking points.

Somdev rose to a career high ranking of No. 94 on 25 October.

=== 2011: Breakthrough ===
Somdev started 2011 ranked at No. 108. He started the season with the Chennai Open, an ATP 250 tournament, and lost to qualifier David Goffin in the first round.

Somdev got a wild card to the 2011 Australian Open due to his good performance in 2010. Playing this tournament for the first time in his career, he lost to Tommy Robredo in the first round. Somdev was top seed in the Singapore challenger tournament, where he lost to Andrej Martin of Slovakia in the quarterfinals.

Somdev was given direct entry into the South African Tennis Open 2011, an ATP 250 tournament, by virtue of his good ranking in the ATP circuit. He lost to Kevin Anderson in the final. After this tournament, Somdev reached a ranking of No. 80 as he claimed 150 ATP points from this tournament. He then travelled to Dubai, where he obtained a wild card for the 2011 Dubai Tennis Championships. He faced world No. 2 Roger Federer in the first round of the Dubai Duty Free Tennis Championships, where he lost. Somdev lost 45 ATP points due to this defeat and moved to No. 93.

Then Somdev went to Serbia for the first round of the Davis Cup World Group. Somdev played two singles rubbers and one doubles against the Serbs. He defeated Janko Tipsarević in the second rubber. Somdev showed remarkable resilience in rallying from an identical down 1–4 in the first two sets and clinching the third set on a tie-break to overpower world No. 45 Tipsarević. After this match, India managed to keep the scoreline on 1–1 the opening day. In the fourth rubber of the tie, Somdev faced Victor Troicki and lost. Somdev moved to No. 84 on the ATP charts on 7 March 2011.

After playing the Davis Cup, Somdev played at the BNP Paribas Open. Somdev reached the fourth round of the tournament. This is his best performance at an ATP Masters 1000 event so far. He started the tournament from qualification rounds, and then in the main draw, he defeated Adrian Mannarino in the first round. Then he created a huge upset by beating world No. 22 Marcos Baghdatis in the second round. Then he stunned Xavier Malisse (world No. 52) in the third round. He faced world No. 1 Rafael Nadal in the fourth round and lost, after giving a tough fight. Somdev moved to world No. 73 on 21 March 2011.

After his good performance at Indian Wells, Somdev played the Sony Ericsson Miami Masters ATP 1000 tournament. He defeated world No. 47 Potito Starace in the first round in straight sets, and then stunned big-serving sensation Milos Raonic (world No. 34) in a tough straight-set match. In the third round, he lost to Spain's No. 6 ranked David Ferrer.

Somdev started his clay season at the 2011 US Men's Clay Court Championships in Houston, Texas. He lost to world No. 27 Guillermo García-López in the second round. After taking three weeks rest, he reached Belgrade to play the Serbia open. He defeated Mikhail Kukushkin, in the first round. Then, he stunned world No. 26 Guillermo García-López in the second round. In the quarterfinals, he lost to world No. 36 Janko Tipsarević. He moved to his career-best ranking of No. 70 on 2 May 2011. He lost in the first round of the 2011 French Open to Ivan Ljubičić.

Devvarman lost in the 2011 Wimbledon singles second round, losing to 18th seed Mikhail Youzhny of Russia. In the Atlanta Tennis Championships, Somdev reached the quarterfinals, where he lost to Mardy Fish. He finished the year ranked No. 66 in the world.

=== 2012: Shoulder injury ===
Devvarman began 2012 with a recurring shoulder injury, which ended with him not competing in the first half of the season. He returned to action in accepting a wildcard entry to participate in men's singles event at the 2012 London Olympics. Somdev lost to Tom Burn in the Great Britain F13 event in the first round. He then lost to Benjamin Becker of Germany in straight sets at Winston-Salem in the qualifiers. Somdev entered the main draw of US Open with a protected ranking of 85. He lost to Rubén Ramírez Hidalgo in the first round. He was then defeated by Ernests Gulbis in the first round of Erste Bank Open.

His only wins in the season came in the Charlottesville Challenger, where he reached the quarterfinals after receiving a wildcard entry into the main draw. He ended the year ranked No. 664 in the world, having been largely inactive in 2012.

=== 2013: Return to Top 100 ===
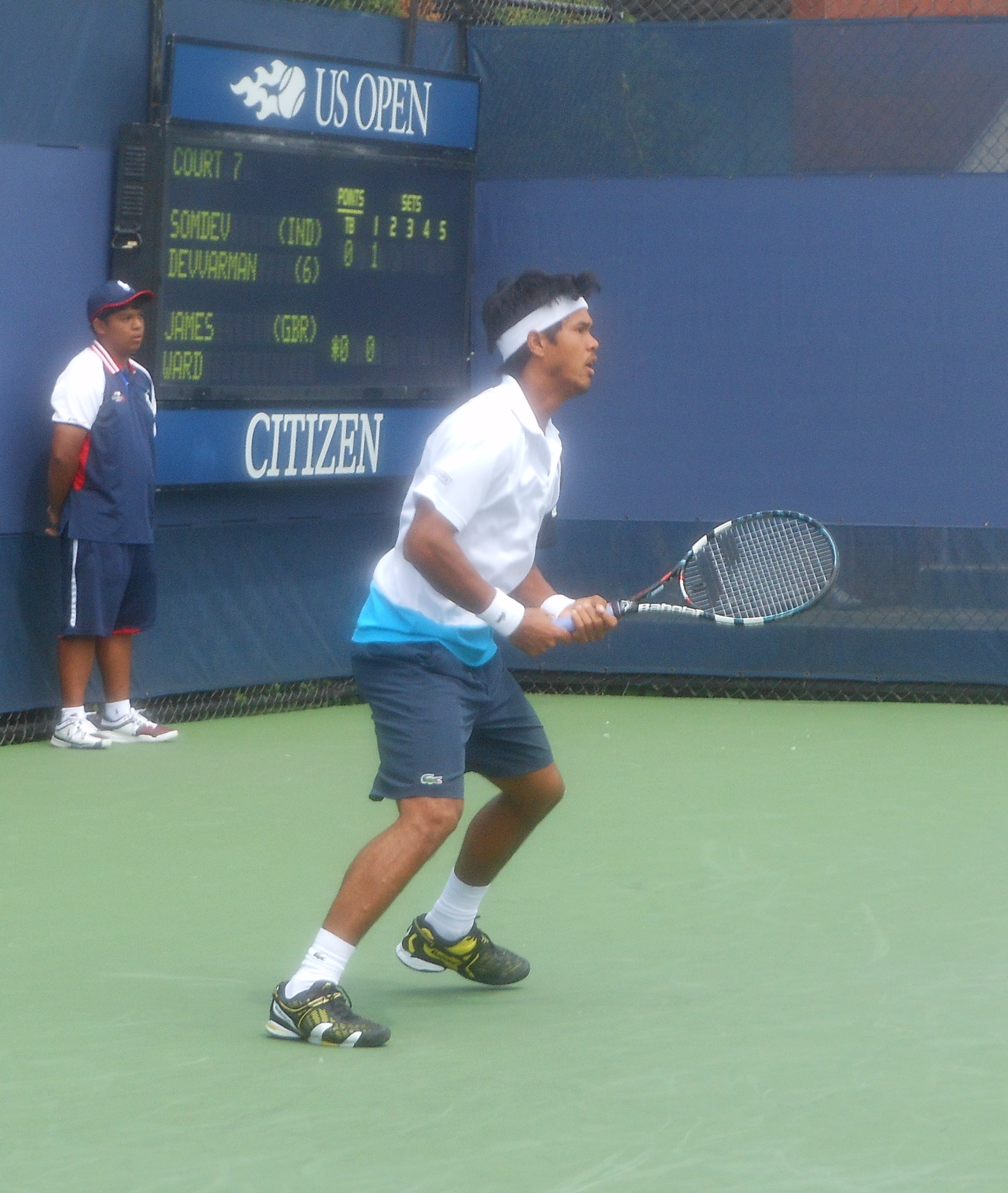
Somdev Devvarman at 2013 US Open

2013 saw Devvarman apparently recovered from the injuries that had prevented him competing in much of 2012.

He won through to the second round of the Chennai Open before succumbing to Tomáš Berdych. He then played in the Australian open, where he advanced to the second round, beating world No. 78 Björn Phau of Germany. However, he lost in the second round to world No. 24 Jerzy Janowicz, despite winning the first two sets. Somdev entered the PBZ Zagreb Indoors tournament, where he won against qualifier Michael Berrer in the first round. He then lost the second round to fourth seeded Jürgen Melzer. He played in Open 13, where he caused an upset against Benoît Paire in the first round, before bowing out of the tournament against Australian Bernard Tomic in the second round. He defeated qualifier Igor Kunitsyn in the first round of the Dubai Duty Free Tennis Championships, before losing to No. 7 Juan Martín del Potro in the second round.

Somdev entered the qualifying draw of the 2013 BNP Paribas Open using his protected ranking of 85. However, he lost to Matteo Viola in the first round. Somdev beat Evgeny Donskoy in the first round of the 2013 Sony Open Tennis. He then played lucky loser Édouard Roger-Vasselin of France in the second round, where he registered a come-from-behind victory in three sets. He next faced No. 1 Novak Djokovic in the third round, where he lost in straight sets. His performance in Miami was a personal best since his comeback from the shoulder injury. Somdev played Rubén Ramírez Hidalgo in the first round of 2013 US Men's Clay Court Championships. Somdev used his protected ranking of 85 for the last time to enter this tournament. However he lost in the first round. He entered the draw at the Sarasota Open. In singles, he defeated Jesse Levine in the first round. He then faced Ilija Bozoljac whom he defeated in straight sets. In the quarterfinals, Somdev defeated Mischa Zverev. Somdev lost to qualifier Alex Kuznetsov in the semifinals. He won the doubles title with his partner Ilija Bozoljac after qualifying into the main draw. He entered the main draw of the Savannah Challenger, where he won his round-of-32 match against Nikoloz Basilashvili as his opponent retired after the first. Somdev, however, lost his next match to Facundo Argüello. Somdev then played at the Tallahassee Challenger but lost in the first round to the eventual winner Denis Kudla.

At the French Open, he qualified for the main draw. In the first round, he beat Daniel Munoz-De La Nava in straight sets. Then, he had a second-round match-up with Roger Federer, but he lost in straight sets.

Somdev then went to play in the Caltanissetta Challenger, where he won his first round against Eduardo Schwank after Schwank retired in the second set. Somdev defeated Leonardo Mayer in the second round and won his quarterfinal match against Federico Delbonis. He lost in the semifinals to Dušan Lajović in straight sets.

Somdev won against Brydan Klein in straight sets in the first round of the Aegon Nottingham Challenger. In the second round, he defeated Jack Sock. He defeated Donald Young in the quarterfinals. He, however, had to face defeat in the semifinals to Steve Johnson.

Somdev faced Matt Reid in the first round of the Wimbledon qualifiers. He lost the match 6–7^{(4)}, 6–4, 16–18. Somdev's first tournament after Wimbledon was the 2013 Nielsen Pro Tennis Championships – Singles. where Somdev reached the semifinals, before losing to Jack Sock. He then entered qualifying at the 2013 BB&T Atlanta Open – Singles, where he lost in the second round to fellow countryman Prakash Amritraj.

=== 2014 ===
In February 2014, Devvarman defeated Kazakhstan's Aleksandr Nedovyesov to win the singles of the 2014 ONGC–GAIL Delhi Open.

=== 2015 ===
He defended his title in February against Yuki Bhambri in the 2015 Delhi Open.

=== 2017: Retirement ===
On 1 January 2017, Devvarman announced his retirement from professional tennis.

== National representation ==
=== Davis Cup ===
Devvarman made his Davis Cup debut for India in 2008 against Uzbekistan at the age of 22. In the second rubber of the tie Devvarman faced Denis Istomin and fell in straight sets. With the tie locked at two match victories each, Devvarman was substituted for countrymen Prakash Amritraj in the fifth rubber. Amritraj would be victorious in four sets. Devvarman would return to the team in the 2008 World Group Playoffs to face Romania. He would fall short in both his singles matches and keep India in the zonals for another year. India started 2009 by playing Chinese Taipei in the Asia Oceania Group 1 quarterfinal. India won 3–2 with a significant contribution from Devvarman who won both his ties against Ti Chen and Yen-Hsun Lu. The team later travelled to Johannesburg to face South Africa in the World Group play-offs. Somdev won both his ties and India won the tie 4–1 to move back into the World Group. India faced Russia in the World Group round 1 at Moscow. India lost the tie 2–3 which included two losses from Somdev. India hosted Brazil at Chennai in the World Group Play-off tie. Somdev lost to Ricardo Mello on day 1 and India went down 0–2. India went to win the tie 3–2 in a come from behind fashion which included a win from Somdev as his opponent Thomaz Bellucci retired whilst he was trailing 6–7^{(3)}, 0–4. This meant that India would once again be a part of the World Group. India drew defending champions Serbia for Round 1. The tie was played at Novi Sad. Somdev played Janko Tipsarević in the second rubber and won in straight sets 7–5, 7–5, 7–6^{(3)} This was a major upset and gave India a realistic chance of reaching the round 2. Due to the absence of Leander Paes and Mahesh Bhupathi, Somdev teamed up with Rohan Bopanna for the Doubles rubber on Saturday. The Indians lost 6–4, 3–6, 4–6, 6–7^{(10)}. Somdev played Viktor Troicki in a make-or-break match for India. However, he lost in straight sets 4–6, 2–6, 5–7. India eventually lost the tie 1–4 with the only win coming from Devvarman. India later travelled to Tokyo to play against Japan in the World Group Play-off. Somdev lost against Yuichi Sugita in the first rubber 3–6, 4–6, 5–7. He didn't play the reverse singles due to a shoulder problem which eventually would make him miss most of the tennis in 2012. India lost the tie 1–4 to Japan which resulted in relegation back to Asia-Oceania Group 1. India had to face South Korea at home in an Asia-Oceania Group 1 tie. 11 players including Somdev had boycotted this tie due to misunderstandings with the All India Tennis Association. India lost that tie to South Korea 1–4. India hosted Indonesia in a relegation play-off tie at Bangalore. Somdev won both his singles matches as India won the tie 5–0 to stay in the Asia-Oceania Group 1.

=== Olympics ===
Competing in his maiden Olympics at London 2012, Devvarman entered the Men's singles via a wildcard entry. He was defeated by Finland's Jarkko Nieminen.

=== Commonwealth Games ===
For the first time in Commonwealth Games history tennis was held at the 2010 Delhi games. Playing in front of a home crowd, Devvarman entered the Men's singles and Men's doubles. He won the gold medal in singles.

=== Asian Games ===
Somdev represented India at the 2010 Asian Games in Guangzhou, China. He won the gold medal in the men's singles event where he defeated Denis Istomin 6–1, 6–2 in the final. He also won the gold medal in the men's doubles event with his partner Sanam Singh. They defeated Gong Maoxin and Li Zhe of China in the final 6–3, 6–7^{(4)}, 10–8. Somdev was also a part of the Men's Team which won the bronze medal.

== Management ==
Devvarman is now professionally managed by Mahesh Bhupathi's company Globosport.

He is sponsored by Lacoste and Babolat.

== Personal life ==
His parents are from the state of Tripura in India. Devvarman belongs to Tripura's erstwhile royal family. He is the grandson of Tripura's late royal scion Bikramendra Kishore Debbarman, popularly known as Bidurkarta. He is a big fan of Roger Federer. He idolises the Krishnans (Ramesh Krishnan, Ramanathan Krishnan), Leander Paes and Mahesh Bhupathi. He likes watching cricket and idolises Sachin Tendulkar. His favourite film is Good Will Hunting and his favourite actress is Priyanka Chopra. Devvarman's favourite food is sambar rice. Devvarman's favourite musician is Dave Matthews.

== ATP career finals ==
=== Singles: 2 (2 runner-ups) ===
Legend Grand Slam tournaments (0–0) ATP World Tour finals (0–0) ATP World Tour Masters 1000 (0–0) ATP World Tour 500 series (0–0) ATP World Tour 250 series (0–2)	Titles by surface Hard (0–2) Clay (0–0) Grass (0–0)	Titles by setting Outdoor (0–1) Indoor (0–1)

Result	W–L	Date	Tournament	Tier	Surface	Opponent	Score
Loss	0–1	Jan 2009	Chennai Open, India	250 Series	Hard	(Croatia) Marin Čilić	4–6, 6–7^{(3–7)}
Loss	0–2	Feb 2011	SA Tennis Open, South Africa	250 Series	Hard (i)	(South Africa) Kevin Anderson	6–4, 3–6, 2–6

=== Doubles: 1 (1 runner-up) ===
Legend Grand Slam tournaments (0–0) ATP World Tour Finals (0–0) ATP World Tour Masters 1000 (0–0) ATP World Tour 500 Series (0–0) ATP World Tour 250 Series (0–1)	Titles by surface Hard (0–1) Clay (0–0) Grass (0–0)	Titles by setting Outdoor (0–1) Indoor (0–0)

Result	W–L	Date	Tournament	Tier	Surface	Partner	Opponents	Score
Loss	0–1	Jul 2011	Los Angeles Open, United States	250 Series	Hard	(Philippines) Treat Huey	(The Bahamas) Mark Knowles (Belgium) Xavier Malisse	6–7^{(3–7)}, 6–7^{(10–12)}

== Performance timelines ==
Key
W	F	SF	QF	#R	RR	Q#	P#	DNQ	A	Z#	PO	G	S	B	NMS	NTI	P	NH

(W) winner; (F) finalist; (SF) semifinalist; (QF) quarterfinalist; (#R) rounds 4, 3, 2, 1; (RR) round-robin stage; (Q#) qualification round; (P#) preliminary round; (DNQ) did not qualify; (A) absent; (Z#) Davis/Fed Cup Zonal Group (with number indication) or (PO) play-off; (G) gold, (S) silver or (B) bronze Olympic/Paralympic medal; (NMS) not a Masters tournament; (NTI) not a Tier I tournament; (P) postponed; (NH) not held; (SR) strike rate (events won / competed); (W–L) win–loss record.

=== Singles ===
Current till 2015 US Open.

Tournament	2008	2009	2010	2011	2012	2013	2014	2015	2016	SR	W–L	Win %
Grand Slam tournaments
Australian Open	A	Q2	Q3	1R	A	2R	1R	Q1	Q1	0 / 3	1–3	25.00
French Open	A	Q3	1R	1R	A	2R	1R	Q2	A	0 / 4	1–4	20.00
Wimbledon	A	Q1	Q2	2R	A	Q1	1R	Q1	A	0 / 2	1–2	33.33
US Open	A	2R	1R	1R	1R	2R	Q1	Q1	A	0 / 5	2–5	28.57
Win–loss	0–0	1–1	0–2	1–4	0–1	3–3	0–3	0–0	0–0	0 / 14	5–14	26.32
Davis Cup	PO	PO	1R	PO	A	A	A	A	A	0 / 5	6–8	42.86
ATP Masters Series
Indian Wells Masters	A	A	Q2	4R	A	Q1	Q1	A	Q1	0 / 1	3–1	75.00
Miami Masters	A	A	Q2	3R	A	3R	Q1	A	A	0 / 2	4–2	66.67
Monte-Carlo Masters	A	A	A	A	A	A	A	A	A	0 / 0	0–0	–
Rome Masters	A	A	A	A	A	A	A	A	A	0 / 0	0–0	–
Madrid Masters	A	A	A	A	A	A	A	A	A	0 / 0	0–0	–
Canada Masters	A	A	1R	A	A	A	A	A	A	0 / 1	0–1	0.00
Cincinnati Masters	A	A	1R	Q1	A	A	Q1	A	A	0 / 1	0–1	0.00
Shanghai Masters	A	A	A	1R	A	Q2	Q1	A	A	0 / 1	0–1	0.00
Paris Masters	A	A	A	A	A	A	A	A	A	A	0 / 0	0–0
Win–loss	0–0	0–0	0–2	5–3	0–0	2–1	0–0	0–0	0–0	0 / 6	7–6	53.85
Career statistics
Titles–Finals	0–0	0–1	0–0	0–1	0–0	0–0	0–0	0–0	0–0	0 / 2	0–2	0.00
Year-end ranking	204	126	108	66	664	90	139	177	909	$1,459,122		

=== Doubles ===
Current till 2013 US Open (tennis).

Tournament	2008	2009	2010	2011	2012	2013	W–L
Grand Slam tournaments
Australian Open	A	2R	A	A	A	0 / 1	1–1
French Open	A	A	1R	A	A	0 / 1	0–1
Wimbledon	1R	1R	2R	A	A	0 / 3	1–3
US Open	A	A	3R	A	A	0 / 1	2–1
Win–loss	0–1	1–2	3–3	0–0	0–0	0 / 6	4–6
