= Stéphane Robert =

French tennis player

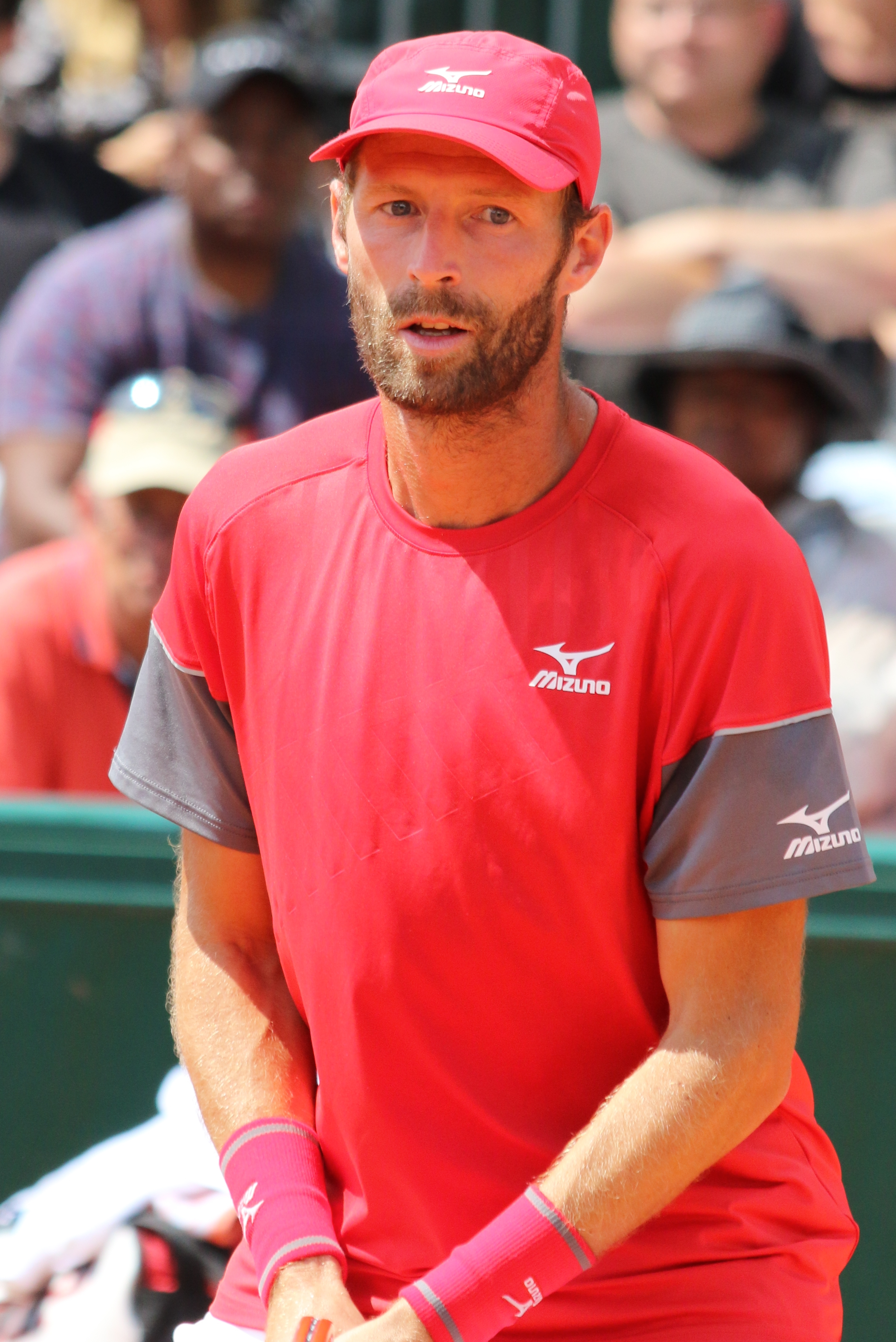
- Robert at the 2018 French Open
- Country (sports): France
- Residence: Valletta, Malta
- Born: 17 May 1980 (age 46) Montargis, France
- Height: 1.85 m (6 ft 1 in)
- Turned pro: 2001
- Retired: February 2022
- Plays: Right-handed (two-handed backhand)
- Prize money: $2,448,915

Singles
- Career record: 38–75
- Career titles: 0
- Highest ranking: No. 50 (24 October 2016)

Grand Slam singles results
- Australian Open: 4R (2014)
- French Open: 2R (2011, 2016)
- Wimbledon: 2R (2013, 2018)
- US Open: 2R (2013)

Doubles
- Career record: 16–27
- Career titles: 1
- Highest ranking: No. 99 (28 April 2014)

Grand Slam doubles results
- Australian Open: 1R (2017)
- French Open: 3R (2018)
- Wimbledon: 2R (2016)
- US Open: 2R (2016)
- Last updated on: 30 April 2023.

Stéphane Robert (French pronunciation: [stefan ʁɔbɛʁ]; born 17 May 1980) is a French tennis coach and a former professional player. He reached a career-high singles ranking of world No. 50 on 24 October 2016.

== Professional career ==
=== 2007–2008 ===
Robert missed 16 months of tennis action in 2007–2008 because he was infected with the Hepatitis A virus in February 2007. In early June 2008, he returned to tennis action at the ITF Men's Circuit tournament in Apeldoorn, without an ATP singles ranking, reaching the final as a qualifier.

=== 2010–2011: Top 100 debut, first Top 10 win ===
On 1 February 2010, Robert broke into Top 100 of the ATP singles rankings for the first time at No. 100. Within one week of his singles rankings breakthrough and seeded eight, he defeated for the first time in his career a player (David Ferrer) ranked in the top 20 of the ATP singles rankings in the semifinals before reaching his first ATP World Tour singles final at the 2010 SA Tennis Open, falling to 3rd-seeded Feliciano López 5–7, 1–6. Robert rose to a career-high of No. 61 of the ATP singles rankings on 22 February 2010 one day after winning the ATP Challenger Tour singles title in Tangier.

Robert rose to international prominence in 2011, as a qualifier, when he beat the 2010 Wimbledon singles finalist and world No. 6 Tomáš Berdych 3–6, 3–6, 6–2, 6–2, 9–7 in the first round of the 2011 French Open to register the biggest singles win of his career, having saved a match point at 4–5 in the deciding set. It was the first time that he had beaten a player ranked in the top 10 of the ATP singles rankings. Robert lost his second round match to Fabio Fognini in straight sets.

=== 2014: Australian Open fourth round as lucky loser ===
Robert reached the singles fourth round of a Grand Slam tournament for the first time at the 2014 Australian Open, where he lost to 4th seeded Andy Murray. He was only one of two lucky losers to reach the fourth round of a Grand Slam tournament since Dick Norman achieved the feat at the 1995 Wimbledon Championships, David Goffin (at the 2012 French Open) being the other.

Robert and Jesse Huta Galung became only the third lucky loser doubles team to clinch an ATP World Tour doubles title by defeating Daniel Nestor and Nenad Zimonjić in the final of the 2014 Barcelona Open Banc Sabadell. That was Robert's first ATP World Tour doubles final appearance. After losing in the first round of the 2014 Wimbledon Championships to Nick Kyrgios, Robert missed the rest of the year because of leg injury.

=== 2016: Top 50 debut ===
Robert qualified for the singles main draw of the 2016 Australian Open by winning three qualifying matches, and he lost in the third round of the main draw to Gaël Monfils. That was only the second time Robert had progressed to the third round of the singles main draw of a Grand Slam tournament.

On July 15, 2016, Robert, who was unseeded and had an ATP singles ranking of No. 83 coming into the tournament, reached the semifinal at the 2016 German Open, where he lost to Martin Kližan. It was Robert's first ATP World Tour semifinal since February 2010, when he was defeated in the final in Johannesburg. Robert's ATP singles ranking reached a career-high of No. 59 on 18 July 2016, right after his semifinal appearance in Hamburg, which was a massive improvement over his ATP singles ranking of No. 558 on 25 May 2015.

From 2001 to March 2010, Ronan Lafaix was Robert's coach. In May 2016, Lafaix, who is 12 years older than Robert, became Robert's coach for the second time. Lafaix joined the Mouratoglou Tennis Academy and has coached several professional tennis players, including Hamad Medjedovic.

== Coaching career ==
He is currently coaching Kyrian Jacquet.

== ATP World Tour career finals ==
=== Singles: 1 (1 runner-up) ===
Legend Grand Slam tournaments (0–0) ATP World Tour Finals (0–0) ATP World Tour Masters 1000 (0–0) ATP World Tour 500 Series (0–0) ATP World Tour 250 Series (0–1)	Titles by surface Hard (0–1) Clay (0–0) Grass (0–0)	Titles by setting Outdoor (0–1) Indoor (0–0)

Result	W–L	Date	Tournament	Tier	Surface	Opponent	Score
Loss	0–1	Feb 2010	SA Tennis Open, South Africa	250 Series	Hard	(Spain) Feliciano López	5–7, 1–6

=== Doubles: 1 (1 title) ===
Legend Grand Slam tournaments (0–0) ATP World Tour Finals (0–0) ATP World Tour Masters 1000 (0–0) ATP World Tour 500 Series (1–0) ATP World Tour 250 Series (0–0)	Titles by surface Hard (0–0) Clay (1–0) Grass (0–0)	Titles by setting Outdoor (1–0) Indoor (0–0)

Result	W–L	Date	Tournament	Tier	Surface	Partner	Opponents	Score
Win	1–0	Apr 2014	Barcelona Open, Spain	500 Series	Clay	(Netherlands) Jesse Huta Galung	(Canada) Daniel Nestor (Serbia) Nenad Zimonjić	6–3, 6–3

== ATP Challenger Tour and ITF Men's Circuit career finals ==
=== Singles: 39 (23–16) ===
Legend (singles)
ATP Challenger Tour (9–10)
ITF Men's Circuit (14–6)

Result	No.	Date	Tournament	Surface	Opponent	Score
Win	1.	February 25, 2002	Jaffa, Israel	Hard	(Slovakia) Branislav Sekáč	6–4, 6–2
Win	2.	June 2, 2003	Kranj, Slovenia	Clay	(Spain) Ivan Esquerdo	6–4, 3–6, 7–5
Win	3.	July 14, 2003	Belgrade, Serbia and Montenegro	Clay	(Bulgaria) Todor Enev	6–2, 4–1, ret.
Win	4.	July 21, 2003	Belgrade, Serbia and Montenegro	Clay	(Serbia and Montenegro) Vladimir Pavićević	6–3, 6–3
Win	5.	September 8, 2003	Sofia, Bulgaria	Clay	(Germany) Daniel Elsner	6–1, 4–6, 7–6^{(7–4)}
Win	6.	September 13, 2004	Budapest, Hungary	Clay	(Italy) Alessio di Mauro	6–1, 4–6, 7–5
Win	7.	October 17, 2005	Barcelona, Spain	Clay	(Spain) Pablo Andújar	7–5, 6–3
Loss	1.	January 2, 2006	Exmouth, United Kingdom	Carpet (i)	(Latvia) Andis Juška	3–6, 6–1, 4–6
Win	8.	January 9, 2006	Barnstaple, United Kingdom	Hard (i)	(France) Jérémy Chardy	7–6^{(7–3)}, 6–1
Loss	2.	January 24, 2006	Wrexham, United Kingdom	Hard (i)	(United Kingdom) Alex Bogdanović	3–6, 2–6
Win	9.	January 16, 2007	Sunderland, United Kingdom	Hard (i)	(France) Thomas Oger	6–2, 7–5
Win	10.	February 13, 2007	Barnstaple, United Kingdom	Hard (i)	(Germany) Torsten Popp	7–5, 7–5
Loss	3.	June 9, 2008	Apeldoorn, Netherlands	Clay	(Netherlands) Thiemo de Bakker	6–7^{(2–7)}, 1–6
Loss	4.	June 23, 2008	Toulon, France	Clay	(France) Nicolas Coutelot	4–6, 4–6
Loss	5.	August 4, 2008	Avezzano, Italy	Clay	(Sweden) Michael Ryderstedt	2–6, 0–6
Win	11.	September 15, 2008	Nottingham, United Kingdom	Hard	(United Kingdom) Josh Goodall	6–4, 6–0
Win	12.	September 29, 2008	Nevers, France	Hard (i)	(France) Vincent Millot	6–4, 6–1
Win	13.	January 13, 2009	Glasgow, United Kingdom	Hard (i)	(United Kingdom) Colin Fleming	2–6, 6–4, 6–4
Loss	6.	January 27, 2009	Mettmann, Germany	Carpet (i)	(Czech Republic) Lukáš Rosol	6–7^{(6–8)}, 4–6
Win	14.	February 16, 2009	Trento, Italy	Hard (i)	(United Kingdom) Josh Goodall	6–4, 6–3
Loss	7.	March 10, 2009	Tipton, United Kingdom	Hard (i)	(Belgium) Yannick Mertens	6–7^{(4–7)}, 6–7^{(5–7)}
Win	15.	March 17, 2009	Bath, United Kingdom	Hard (i)	(United Kingdom) Colin Fleming	6–2, 6–3
Win	16.	June 8, 2009	Košice, Slovakia	Clay	(Czech Republic) Jiří Vaněk	7–6^{(7–5)}, 7–6^{(7–5)}
Win	17.	September 13, 2009	Alphen aan den Rijn, Netherlands	Clay	(United States) Michael Russell	7–6^{(7–2)}, 5–7, 7–6^{(7–5)}
Loss	8.	October 25, 2009	Orléans, France	Hard (i)	(Belgium) Xavier Malisse	1–6, 2–6
Loss	9.	November 15, 2009	Saint Brélade, Jersey	Carpet (i)	(Finland) Jarkko Nieminen	6–4, 1–6, 5–7
Win	18.	February 21, 2010	Tangier, Morocco	Clay	(Ukraine) Aleksandr Dolgopolov Jr.	7–6^{(7–5)}, 6–4
Loss	10.	March 20, 2011	Le Gosier, Guadeloupe	Hard	(Belgium) Olivier Rochus	2–6, 3–6
Win	19.	May 1, 2011	Ostrava, Czech Republic	Clay	(Hungary) Ádám Kellner	6–1, 6–3
Loss	11.	February 2, 2013	Burnie, Australia	Hard	(Australia) John Millman	2–6, 6–4, 0–6
Win	20.	February 17, 2013	Melbourne, Australia	Hard	(Australia) James Duckworth	7–6^{(7–3)}, 6–3
Loss	12.	September 14, 2013	Seville, Spain	Clay	(Spain) Daniel Gimeno Traver	4–6, 6–7^{(2–7)}
Loss	13.	November 8, 2015	Hua Hin, Thailand	Hard	(Japan) Yūichi Sugita	2–6, 6–1, 3–6
Win	21.	February 21, 2016	New Delhi, India	Hard	(India) Saketh Myneni	6–3, 6–0
Loss	14.	March 20, 2016	Guadalajara, Mexico	Hard	(Morocco) Malek Jaziri	7–5, 3–6, 6–7^{(5–7)}
Loss	15.	July 11, 2016	Prague, Czech Republic	Clay	(Czech Republic) Adam Pavlásek	4–6, 6–3, 3–6
Loss	16.	September 24, 2017	İzmir, Turkey	Hard	(Ukraine) Illya Marchenko	6–7^{(2–7)}, 0–6
Win	22.	November 12, 2017	Kobe, Japan	Hard(i)	(France) Calvin Hemery	7–6^{(7–1)}, 6–7^{(5–7)}, 6–1
Win	23.	February 4, 2018	Burnie, Australia	Hard	(Germany) Daniel Altmaier	6–1, 6–2

=== Doubles: 33 (14–19) ===
Legend (doubles)
ATP Challenger Tour (8–11)
ITF Men's Circuit (6–8)

Result	No.	Date	Tournament	Surface	Partner	Opponents	Score
Loss	1.	February 17, 2003	Lorca, Spain	Clay	(Spain) Esteban Carril	(Spain) Salvador Navarro (Spain) Gabriel Trujillo	2–6, 0–6
Win	1.	February 24, 2003	Cartagena, Spain	Clay	(United Kingdom) Miles Maclagan	(Spain) Salvador Navarro (Spain) Gabriel Trujillo	7–6^{(7–3)}, 7–6^{(7–4)}
Loss	2.	May 5, 2003	Edinburgh, United Kingdom	Clay	(Algeria) Slimane Saoudi	(South Africa) Rik de Voest (Sweden) Marcus Sarstrand	3–6, 1–6
Loss	3.	July 14, 2003	Belgrade, Serbia and Montenegro	Clay	(France) Xavier Audouy	(Bulgaria) Todor Enev (Bulgaria) Radoslav Lukaev	4–6, 7–6^{(9–7)}, 4–6
Win	2.	July 21, 2003	Belgrade, Serbia and Montenegro	Clay	(Egypt) Mohamed Mamoun	(Serbia and Montenegro) Nikola Ćirić (Serbia and Montenegro) Goran Tošić	7–5, 6–2
Loss	4.	November 17, 2003	Curaçao, Netherlands Antilles	Hard	(Italy) Alessandro Motti	(Netherlands) Michel Koning (Netherlands) Steven Korteling	3–6, 6–3, 1–6
Win	3.	November 24, 2003	Oranjestad, Aruba	Hard	(Italy) Alessandro Motti	(Netherlands) Bart Beks (Netherlands) Paul Logtens	6–4, 6–0
Loss	5.	July 5, 2004	Budaörs, Hungary	Clay	(Czech Republic) Ota Fukárek	(Spain) Ignacio González (Spain) Gabriel Trujillo	6–3, 2–6, 3–6
Win	4.	August 2, 2004	Poznań, Poland	Clay	(Poland) Adam Chadaj	(Czech Republic) Tomáš Cibulec (Czech Republic) David Škoch	3–6, 6–1, 6–2
Loss	6.	June 13, 2005	Blois, France	Clay	(Spain) Esteban Carril	(Netherlands) Bart Beks (Netherlands) Matwé Middelkoop	6–4, 2–6, 3–6
Loss	7.	July 4, 2005	Budaörs, Hungary	Clay	(Poland) Adam Chadaj	(Israel) Amir Hadad (Israel) Harel Levy	4–6, 7–6^{(9–7)}, 3–6
Win	5.	November 21, 2005	Saint-Leu, Réunion	Hard	(Russia) Teymuraz Gabashvili	(Croatia) Ivan Cerović (Serbia and Montenegro) Petar Popović	6–4, 6–3
Win	6.	January 24, 2006	Wrexham, United Kingdom	Hard (i)	(France) Jean-François Bachelot	(United Kingdom) Colin Fleming (United Kingdom) Jamie Murray	6–4, 7–5
Win	7.	February 27, 2006	Cherbourg, France	Hard (i)	(France) Jean-François Bachelot	(Thailand) Sanchai Ratiwatana (Thailand) Sonchat Ratiwatana	7–6^{(7–5)}, 6–3
Loss	8.	March 27, 2006	Saint-Brieuc, France	Clay (i)	(Switzerland) Michael Lammer	(United States) Eric Butorac (United States) Chris Drake	4–6, 4–6
Win	8.	January 15, 2007	Sunderland, United Kingdom	Hard (i)	(France) Jean-François Bachelot	(Italy) Fabio Colangelo (Italy) Marco Crugnola	6–3, 6–4
Win	9.	February 12, 2007	Barnstaple, United Kingdom	Hard (i)	(Pakistan) Aisam-ul-Haq Qureshi	(United States) Philip Stolt (Germany) Lars Uebel	6–2, 6–3
Win	10.	July 7, 2008	Bourg-en-Bresse, France	Clay	(France) Alexandre Renard	(France) Thomas Cazes-Carrère (France) Baptiste Dupuy	6–4, 7–5
Loss	9.	July 21, 2008	Modena, Italy	Clay	(Kuwait) Mohammed Ghareeb	(Chile) Guillermo Hormazábal (Chile) Hans Podlipnik Castillo	3–6, 2–6
Loss	10.	August 4, 2008	Avezzano, Italy	Clay	(France) Alexandre Renard	(Chile) Guillermo Hormazábal (Chile) Hans Podlipnik Castillo	3–6, 7–6^{(7–4)}, [10–12]
Loss	11.	September 29, 2008	Nevers, France	Hard (i)	(France) Alexandre Renard	(France) Vincent Millot (France) Pierrick Ysern	2–6, 4–6
Loss	12.	May 17, 2009	Bordeaux, France	Clay	(France) Xavier Pujo	(Uruguay) Pablo Cuevas (Argentina) Horacio Zeballos	6–4, 4–6, [4–10]
Loss	13.	July 12, 2009	San Benedetto del Tronto, Italy	Clay	(Belgium) Niels Desein	(Italy) Stefano Ianni (Switzerland) Cristian Villagrán	6–7^{(3–7)}, 6–1, [6–10]
Loss	14.	September 27, 2009	Ljubljana, Slovenia	Clay	(Italy) Simone Vagnozzi	(United Kingdom) Jamie Delgado (United Kingdom) Jamie Murray	3–6, 3–6
Win	11.	March 20, 2011	Le Gosier, Guadeloupe	Hard	(Italy) Riccardo Ghedin	(France) Arnaud Clément (Belgium) Olivier Rochus	6–2, 5–7, [10–7]
Win	12.	May 1, 2011	Ostrava, Czech Republic	Clay	(France) Olivier Charroin	(Latvia) Andis Juška (Russia) Alexander Kudryavtsev	6–4, 6–3
Loss	15.	July 3, 2011	Braunschweig, Germany	Clay	(France) Olivier Charroin	(Germany) Martin Emmrich (Sweden) Andreas Siljeström	6–0, 4–6, [7–10]
Loss	16.	July 17, 2011	Sopot, Poland	Clay	(France) Olivier Charroin	(Poland) Mariusz Fyrstenberg (Poland) Marcin Matkowski	5–7, 6–7^{(4–7)}
Win	13.	July 24, 2011	Poznań, Poland	Clay	(France) Olivier Charroin	(Brazil) Franco Ferreiro (Brazil) Andre Sá	6–2, 6–3
Loss	17.	March 17, 2012	Rabat, Morocco	Clay	(Slovakia) Martin Kližan	(Spain) Íñigo Cervantes Huegun (Argentina) Federico Delbonis	7–6^{(7–3)}, 1–6, [5–10]
Loss	18.	April 6, 2012	Saint-Brieuc, France	Clay	(France) Laurent Rochette	(Lithuania) Laurynas Grigelis (Australia) Rameez Junaid	6–1, 2–6, [6–10]
Win	14.	September 14, 2013	Seville, Spain	Clay	(Italy) Alessandro Motti	(Netherlands) Stephan Fransen (Netherlands) Wesley Koolhof	7–5, 7–5
Loss	19.	September 27, 2015	Trnava, Slovakia	Clay	(Poland) Kamil Majchrzak	(Netherlands) Wesley Koolhof (Netherlands) Matwé Middelkoop	4–6, 2–6

== Grand Slam performance timelines ==
Key
W	F	SF	QF	#R	RR	Q#	DNQ	A	NH

(W) winner; (F) finalist; (SF) semifinalist; (QF) quarterfinalist; (#R) rounds 4, 3, 2, 1; (RR) round-robin stage; (Q#) qualification round; (DNQ) did not qualify; (A) absent; (NH) not held; (SR) strike rate (events won / competed); (W–L) win–loss record.
To avoid confusion and double counting, these charts are updated at the conclusion of a tournament or when the player's participation has ended.

=== Singles ===
Tournament	2004	2005	2006	2007	2008	2009	2010	2011	2012	2013	2014	2015	2016	2017	2018	2019	2020	2021	W–L
Australian Open	Q2	Q1	A	A	A	A	2R	1R	1R	Q1	4R	1R	3R	1R	Q3	Q1	A	A	6–7
French Open	1R	A	Q3	A	A	Q2	1R	2R	Q1	Q3	1R	1R	2R	1R	Q1	A	A	A	2–7
Wimbledon	Q2	A	Q1	A	A	Q2	1R	Q1	Q2	2R	1R	Q3	1R	Q1	2R	A	NH	A	2–5
US Open	A	A	A	A	A	Q2	1R	A	A	2R	A	A	1R	Q2	Q1	A	A	A	1–3
Win–loss	0–1	0–0	0–0	0–0	0–0	0–0	1–4	1–2	0–1	2–2	3–3	0–2	3–4	0–2	1–1	0–0	0–0	0-0	11–22

=== Doubles ===
Tournament	2004	2005	2006	2007	2008	2009	2010	2011	2012	2013	2014	2015	2016	2017	2018	2019	2020	2021	W–L
Australian Open	A	A	A	A	A	A	A	A	A	A	A	A	A	1R	A	A	A	A	0–1
French Open	1R	A	2R	A	A	A	1R	A	1R	A	A	A	1R	A	3R	A	A	A	5–7
Wimbledon	A	A	A	A	A	A	1R	1R	A	A	A	Q1	2R	A	A	A	NH	A	1–3
US Open	A	A	A	A	A	A	A	A	A	A	A	A	2R	A	A	A	A	A	1–1
Win–loss	0–1	0–0	1–1	0–0	0–0	0–0	0–2	0–1	0–1	0–0	0–0	0–0	2–3	0–1	2–1	0–0	0–0	0–0	5–11
