= Feliciano López =

Spanish tennis player (born 1981)

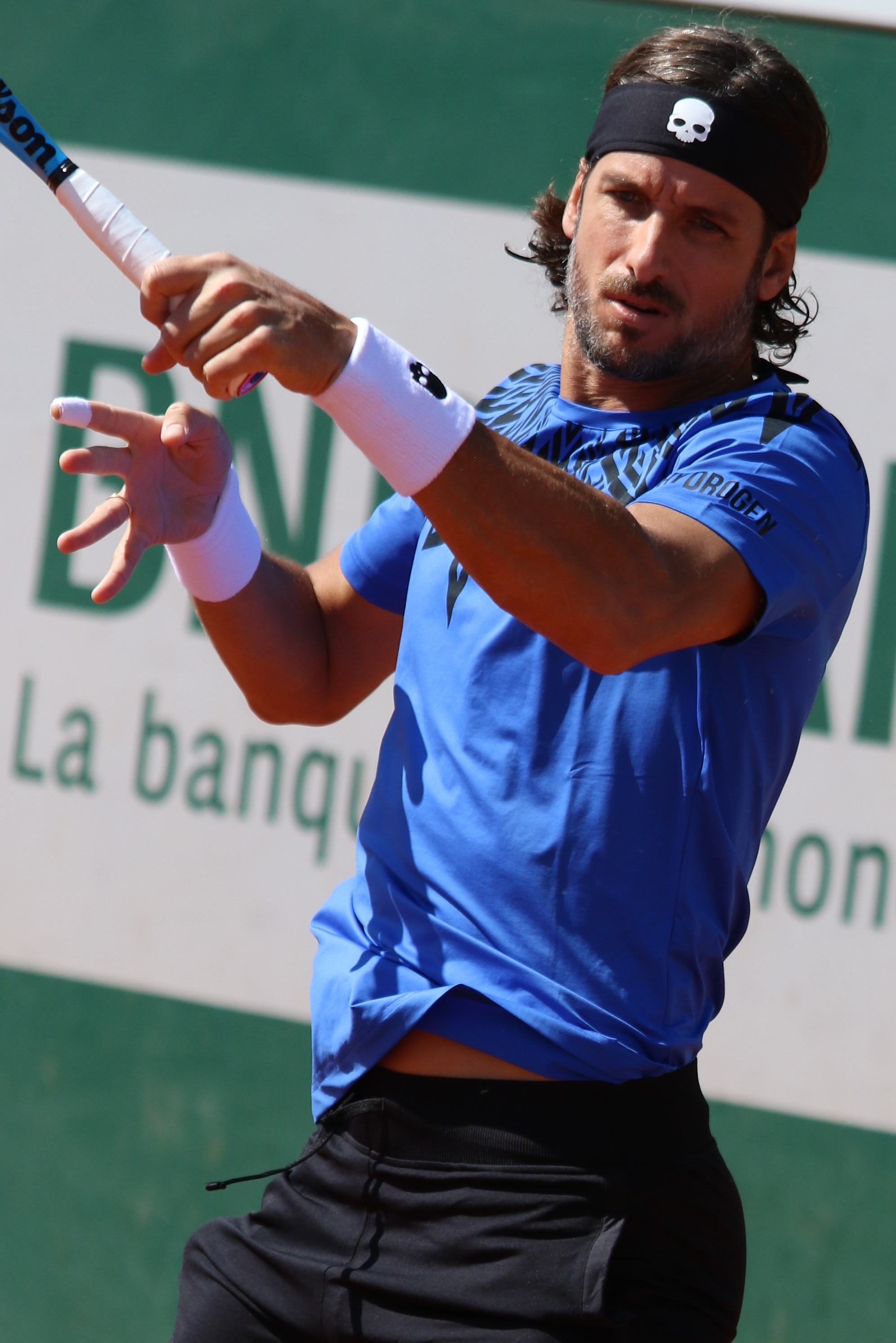
- Lopez at the 2021 French Open
- Full name: Feliciano López Díaz-Guerra
- Country (sports): Spain
- Residence: Madrid, Spain
- Born: 20 September 1981 (age 45) Toledo, Spain
- Height: 1.88 m (6 ft 2 in)
- Turned pro: 1997
- Retired: 2023
- Plays: Left-handed (one-handed backhand)
- Prize money: US$18,706,677: 43rd all-time leader in earnings

Singles
- Career record: 506–490 (50.8%) (Note: in ATP Tour and Grand Slam main draw matches)
- Career titles: 7
- Highest ranking: No. 12 (2 March 2015)

Grand Slam singles results
- Australian Open: 4R (2012, 2015)
- French Open: 4R (2004)
- Wimbledon: QF (2005, 2008, 2011)
- US Open: QF (2015)

Other tournaments
- Tour Finals: Alt (2014)
- Olympic Games: 3R (2004, 2012)

Doubles
- Career record: 260–300 (46.4%)
- Career titles: 6
- Highest ranking: No. 9 (7 November 2016)

Grand Slam doubles results
- Australian Open: QF (2009, 2015)
- French Open: W (2016)
- Wimbledon: 3R (2008)
- US Open: F (2017)

Other doubles tournaments
- Tour Finals: RR (2016)
- Olympic Games: SF – 4th (2012)

Mixed doubles
- Career record: 5–3
- Career titles: 0

Grand Slam mixed doubles results
- French Open: 2R (2004)
- Wimbledon: 3R (2011)

Team competitions
- Davis Cup: W (2008, 2009, 2011, 2019)
- Hopman Cup: RR (2017)

Feliciano López Díaz-Guerra (Spanish pronunciation: [feliˈθjano ˈlopeθ ˈði.aθ ˈɣera]; (Note: In isolation, Díaz-Guerra is pronounced [ˈdi.aθ ˈɣera].) born 20 September 1981) is a Spanish former professional tennis player. He achieved his career-high singles ranking of world No. 12 in March 2015 and doubles ranking of world No. 9 in November 2016.

In 2005, López was the first male Spanish tennis player to reach the quarterfinals of Wimbledon since 1972. He repeated the feat in 2008 and 2011. López defeated Tim Henman at the 2007 Wimbledon second round. He reached the quarterfinals of the 2015 US Open, and won his first Grand Slam title at the 2016 French Open when he won the men's doubles title with Marc López. In 2017, at the age of 35, López won the Aegon Championship at The Queen's Club, London, beating Marin Čilić in a third set tiebreak. He distinguished himself by winning his ATP titles, both in singles and doubles, on all surfaces, hard, grass and clay. During the 2018 Wimbledon Championships, López made his 66th consecutive Grand Slam main draw appearance, surpassing the previous record of 65 consecutive appearances held by Roger Federer.

At the 2022 Australian Open, his record reached 79 consecutive Grand Slam appearances. As of 2022 Wimbledon, he shared the record for most Grand Slam appearances with Novak Djokovic and Federer at 81. He has made 21 consecutive French Open appearances, also a record. López also holds the record for most losses on the ATP Tour, with 490. On 22 June 2021, he achieved 500 match wins at the 2021 Mallorca Championships, putting him No. 10 on the list of active players with over 500 match wins. On 13 July 2021 at the 2021 Hamburg European Open, he became the fifth player in the world to reach 10,000 aces on the most aces in career list. With his direct entry in the 2021 Indian Wells, he broke the record with his 139th participation in events in the Masters 1000 category.

== Playing style ==
López is left-handed and uses a single-handed backhand. He is known for his strong serve and ability to play balls repeatedly on the baseline, and is also a confident net player and has been known to serve and volley. Unlike most Spanish players, who often prefer clay courts due to the popularity of that surface in their country, López is an exceptionally strong grass-court player, with three quarter-final runs at Wimbledon (his strongest Grand Slam showing), as well as 4 titles on grass at the Eastbourne International in 2013 and 2014 and at the Queen's Club Championships in 2017 and 2019. This is due in part to his more traditional playing style, which is more like grass-court legends Pete Sampras and Roger Federer than fellow Spaniards Rafael Nadal and Tommy Robredo. This traditional arsenal includes a big serve and a willingness to come into the net.

== Career ==
=== Early years ===
In 1997, Feliciano López made his pro circuit debut in Mallorca on 29 September, losing in the second round to Dušan Vemić. In 1998, he made his ATP debut at the 1998 Open SEAT, where he lost to Jiří Novák in the first round. He then competed on the Challenger circuit, making the quarter-finals of Spain F7 and Spain F8. In 1999, he competed on the Futures and Challenger circuits. He won his first Futures event in Spain F6, beating Pedro Canovas in the final. He also reached one other final, losing to Réginald Willems at the Spain F7.

In 2000, López competed in only his second ATP tournament at the 2000 Estoril Open, losing to Juan Antonio Marín. His performance was mediocre on the Challenger circuit, and he reached only two quarter-finals. The next year was a better one for López, as he won his second Futures event in France F3, defeating Juan Antonio Marín in the final, and reaching the final in Maia, losing to Jarkko Nieminen. He also made his first ATP win in the 2001 Chevrolet Cup, defeating Adrián García. However, he lost the quarter-final to eventual champion Guillermo Coria. He also made his Grand Slam debut at the 2001 French Open, losing to Carlos Moyá in straight sets.

=== 2002–2005 ===
In 2002, López competed on the ATP circuit regularly. He started the year with his first semi-final at the 2002 ATP Buenos Aires, losing to Nicolás Massú. He followed it up with a quarter-final appearance at the 2002 Delray Beach International Tennis Championships, losing to Antony Dupuis. He also reached the second round of the Miami Masters, losing to Àlex Corretja in the final. He then won his first Grand Slam match at the 2002 French Open, defeating Didac Pérez in five sets, before losing to third seed Tommy Haas in straight sets. In his Wimbledon debut, he reached the fourth round, losing to André Sá four sets, after defeating Guillermo Cañas in five sets with the fifth going to 10–8, in the second round, a match that lasted 3 hours and 40 minutes. This was his first win over a top-20 player. He then gained revenge for his loss to Sá by defeating him in López's US Open debut in the first round in straight sets, before losing to Gastón Gaudio in the next round. He then reached the quarter-finals in Hong Kong and Tokyo. In Tokyo, he defeated Marat Safin in the second round, his first win over a top-5 player. He also reached the third round of the 2002 Madrid Masters, losing to Andre Agassi. He ended the year in the top 100 for the first time, at no. 62.

In 2003, López started the year with first-round exits at Doha and Auckland. He made his Australian Open debut, reaching the third round, but losing to Younes El Aynaoui in four sets. He performed badly in the first rounds in Milan, Marseille, and Rotterdam. He then reached the quarter-finals in Dubai, losing to Tommy Robredo, and in Estoril, losing to Max Mirnyi. He reached the second rounds of Indian Wells and Monte Carlo. In his second French Open, he lost to Mariano Zabaleta in straight sets. He once again reached the fourth round of Wimbledon, where he lost to Roger Federer in straight sets. He then reached two straight semi-finals in Stuttgart and Kitzbühel, losing both to eventual champion Guillermo Coria. He continued his form by reaching the quarter-finals at the 2003 Canada Masters, losing to David Nalbandian in straight sets. After early losses in Cincinnati, Long Island, the US Open, and Moscow, he reached the quarter-finals of Vienna, the Madrid Masters, and Basel. He ended the year with second-round exit at the Paris Masters, where he lost to Guillermo Coria, his fifth lost to Coria. He ended the year ranked no. 28.

In 2004, López began the year with a 1–3 record, losing in the first rounds of Sydney, the 2004 Australian Open, and Milan, with his only win coming at the Davis Cup. He reached his first final at the 2004 Dubai Open, losing to Roger Federer. He then reached the second rounds of the 2004 Indian Wells Masters, the 2004 Miami Masters, the 2004 Open de Tenis Comunidad Valenciana, and the 2004 Monte Carlo Masters. He also reached the fourth round of the 2004 French Open, losing to Gustavo Kuerten. This was the furthest he had reached at the French Open. He then lost in the third round of 2004 Wimbledon, losing to tall Croatian Ivo Karlović. In his next three tournaments, he reached the second round, in Stuttgart, the Canada Masters, and the Cincinnati Masters. He also reached the quarter-finals of Kitzbühel, losing to Fernando Verdasco. In the 2004 US Open, he reached the third round, before losing to eventual runner-up Lleyton Hewitt. Then at the 2004 Bank Austria-TennisTrophy, he won his first title, defeating Guillermo Cañas in the final. He ended the year with a quarter-final appearance at the 2004 Paris Masters, losing to Guillermo Cañas. He ended the year at world no. 24.

He started 2005 with quarter-final appearances at the 2005 Qatar ExxonMobil Open, losing to Roger Federer, and at the 2005 Medibank International, losing to Radek Štěpánek. At the 2005 Australian Open, he reached the third round, losing to Joachim Johansson in five sets with the fifth set going to 11–13, in a match that lasted almost four hours. This propelled him to world no. 20 and the semi-finals of 2005 Open 13, once again losing to Joachim Johansson. He then reached the third round of the 2005 Indian Wells Masters, losing to Fabrice Santoro in straight sets, and the quarter-finals of the 2005 Estoril Open, losing to Gastón Gaudio in straight sets. He then reached his first Grand Slam quarter-final at 2005 Wimbledon, losing to Lleyton Hewitt in straight sets. He also reached the quarter-finals in Kitzbühel, losing to Mariano Zabaleta in straight sets. At the 2005 Pilot Pen Tennis, he lost in his third final to James Blake after winning the first set. He then reached the quarter-finals of the 2005 BA-CA Tennis Trophy, losing to Radek Štěpánek in straight sets. He ended the year ranked world no. 34.

=== 2006–2008 ===
2006 was a plateau year for López. He suffered early losses throughout the year. However, he did reach the third round of the 2006 Australian Open, losing to Ivan Ljubičić. He reached the third round of the 2006 Nottingham Open, losing to Jonas Björkman. He reached the final of the 2006 Allianz Suisse Open Gstaad, losing to Richard Gasquet. He reached the third round of the 2006 Legg Mason Tennis Classic, losing to eventual runner-up Andy Murray. He reached the quarter-finals of the 2006 PTT Thailand Open, losing to Jarkko Nieminen. He ended the year at world no. 81, 47 spots lower than the previous year.

In 2007, López started the year badly, having a 2–5 record in his first five tournaments, managing a win only at the 2007 Australian Open, losing to Novak Djokovic, and at the 2007 SAP Open losing to Vincent Spadea. However, he followed it up with a quarter-final appearance at the 2007 Tennis Channel Open, losing to eventual champion Lleyton Hewitt. He then lost in the second round of the 2007 Indian Wells Masters, losing to eventual semi-finalist Andy Roddick. He reached the fourth round of the 2007 Miami Masters, losing to eventual champion Novak Djokovic. He then followed up with a 1–5 record, with his only win coming in the 2007 Open SEAT over compatriot Guillermo García López. López reached the third round of the 2007 Wimbledon Championships, losing to Jo-Wilfried Tsonga, after he ended Tim Henman's Wimbledon career, beating him in a five-set thriller in the second round, Henman having been two sets up. He then reached the semi-finals of the 2007 Mercedes Cup, losing to eventual champion Rafael Nadal. He reached the fourth round of the 2007 US Open, losing to eventual champion Roger Federer, the first set being the fewest games won by Federer in one set in the whole tournament. He followed it up with three straight quarter-finals at the 2007 AIG Japan Open Tennis Championships, losing to eventual champion David Ferrer, at the 2007 BA-CA-TennisTrophy, losing to eventual runner-up Stanislas Wawrinka, and the 2007 Madrid Masters, losing to Roger Federer. He ended the year ranked world no. 35.

In 2008 López once again had a bad start, but rebounded at the 2008 Dubai Tennis Championships by reaching the finals, losing to Andy Roddick. He then reached the third round of the 2008 Miami Masters, losing to Dmitry Tursunov. He suffered first-round losses at the next three Masters Series at the 2008 Monte-Carlo Masters, the 2008 Rome Masters, and the 2008 Hamburg Masters. However, in the middle of these tournaments, he managed to reach the third round of the 2008 Torneo Godó, losing to eventual champion Rafael Nadal. He once again lost early in the first rounds of the 2008 French Open and the 2008 Queen's Club Championships. He reached the quarter-finals of the 2008 Wimbledon Championships, for the second time losing to Marat Safin. He recorded a 2–7 record after Wimbledon with wins coming only at the 2008 Countrywide Classic and at the Davis Cup World Group. He then reached the semi-finals of the 2008 Bank Austria-TennisTrophy, losing to eventual champion Philipp Petzschner, the semi-finals of the 2008 Davidoff Swiss Indoors, losing to eventual champion Roger Federer, and the quarter-finals of the 2008 Mutua Madrileña Masters Madrid, losing to Rafael Nadal. He also helped the Spanish Davis Cup team to win the title against Argentina by beating Juan Martín del Potro. He ended the year world no. 31.

=== 2009: First Masters semifinal, Davis Cup winner ===
In 2009, López started the year with a string of first-round losses, in the 2009 Heineken Open to Jarkko Nieminen, in the 2009 Australian Open to Gilles Müller, and in the 2009 ABN AMRO World Tennis Tournament to Julien Benneteau. He then competed in the 2009 Open 13 and made it to the quarter-finals, before losing to eventual champion Jo-Wilfried Tsonga. López struggled after this, and at one point he suffered eight straight main-draw losses in a row. In the midst of his bad run, he won a title at the Open Castilla y León Challenger event, beating Adrian Mannarino in straight sets. At the inaugural Shanghai Masters, he advanced to his first Master Series semi-final, beating David Ferrer, Jürgen Melzer, and Robin Söderling en route. However, he retired due to a right ankle injury in his semi-final match against Rafael Nadal, trailing 1–6, 0–3. Despite his poor year on the ATP tour, López did play a key role for the Spain Davis Cup team, helping them win the 2009 Davis Cup with doubles wins in the quarter-finals, semi-finals, and finals.

=== 2010: Second ATP title ===
López started his 2010 season by playing in the 2010 Medibank International Sydney, where he lost to eventual runner-up Richard Gasquet in the first round. He then competed in the 2010 Australian Open, where he reached the third round, defeating Pablo Cuevas and Rainer Schüttler, but lost to seventh seed Andy Roddick in a close four-setter.

In the 2010 SA Tennis Open as the third seed, he beat Benjamin Balleret, Blaž Kavčič, and Rajeev Ram in the first three rounds, reaching the final after defeating top seed Gaël Monfils in the semi-finals. He went on to win the tournament, beating the eighth seed Stéphane Robert. Thus, he ended his five and a half-year title drought and won just his second ATP-level title. His finals record now improved to 2–4. He lost in the first rounds of the 2010 ABN AMRO World Tennis Tournament and 2010 Dubai Tennis Championships. He then reached the third round of the 2010 BNP Paribas Open, losing to sixth seed Robin Söderling, after defeating Paul-Henri Mathieu and receiving a bye. He lost to Mardy Fish in the third round, after defeating Michael Berrer in the 2010 Sony Ericsson Open.

In the European clay season, he lost in the first round of 2010 Monte-Carlo Rolex Masters to Tomáš Berdych. He then won his first clay victory of the season by reaching the third round of the 2010 Barcelona Open Banco Sabadell, losing to Robin Söderling. At the 2010 Internazionali BNL d'Italia, López reached the quarter-finals, losing to Ernests Gulbis, but upset Marin Čilić en route. After he disappointingly lost in the opening round at the 2010 French Open, he appeared at the 2010 Aegon Championships, the first grass tournament of the year. He beat Grigor Dimitrov and Julien Benneteau. He went on to stun top seed and world no. 1 Rafael Nadal to reach the semi-finals. There, he lost to Mardy Fish. In the 2010 Aegon International, he retired against 342nd-ranked Briton James Ward down 3–6, 4–5. He then played at 2010 Wimbledon, reaching the third round, but losing to Jürgen Melzer. He then lost three straight matches, beginning in the semi-finals of the 2010 Farmers Classic to Andy Murray, and the first rounds of the 2010 Rogers Cup and the 2010 Western & Southern Financial Group Masters. He reached the fourth round of the 2010 US Open, losing to eventual champion Rafael Nadal in straight sets. He then ended the year with a five-match losing streak: in the second round of 2010 Rakuten Japan Open Tennis Championships and the first rounds of the 2010 Shanghai Rolex Masters 1000, the 2010 If Stockholm Open, the 2010 Valencia Open 500, and the 2010 BNP Paribas Masters.

=== 2011: Third Wimbledon quarterfinal ===
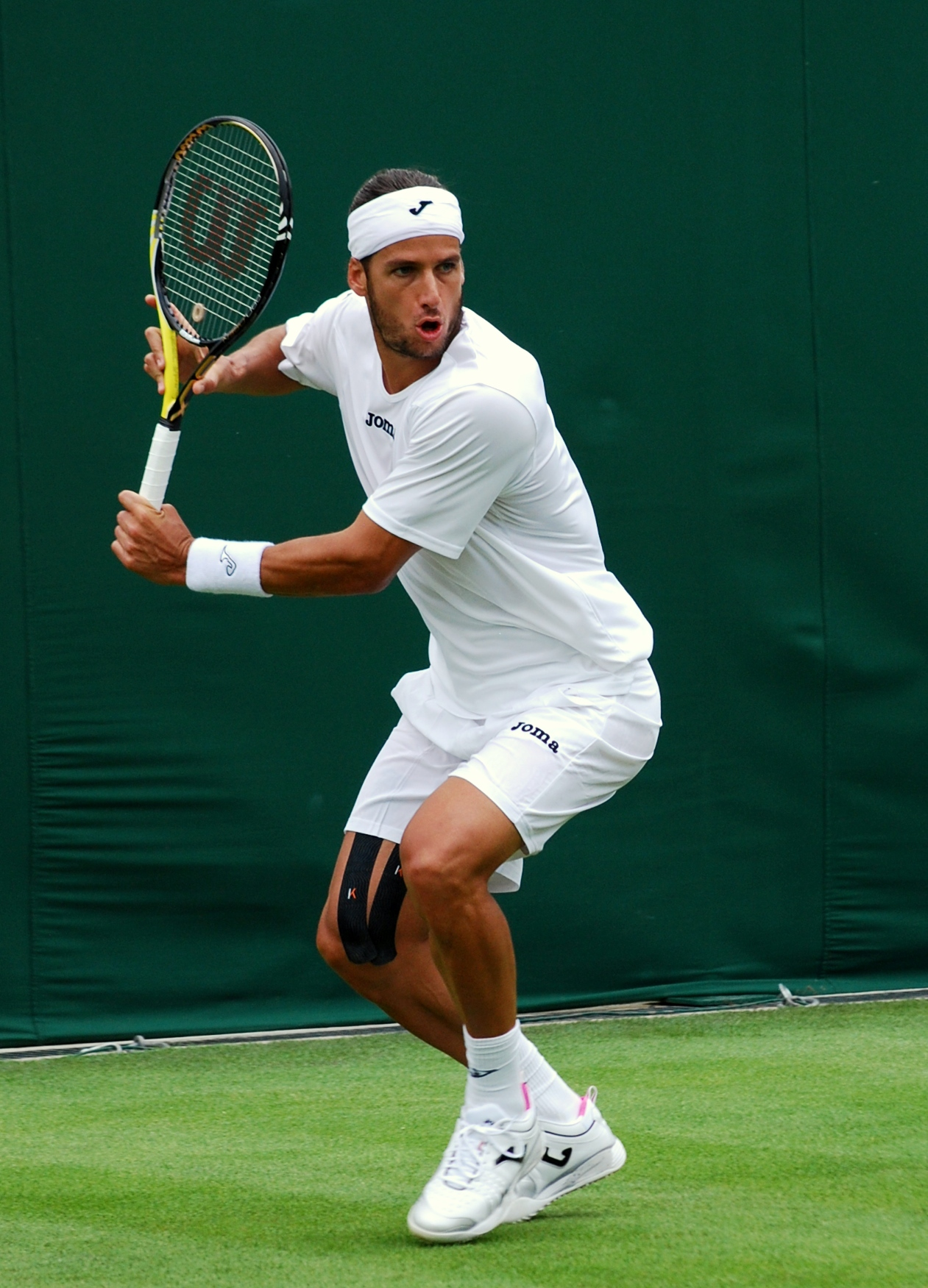
López at the 2011 Wimbledon Championships

López started his 2011 pre-Australian Open preparations at the 2011 Brisbane International and 2011 Medibank International Sydney, but lost early in both tournaments. He then was upset in the second round of the 2011 Australian Open and first round of the 2011 SA Tennis Open by 199th-ranked Bernard Tomic and 235th-ranked Frank Dancevic. He then lost in the second rounds of the 2011 ABN AMRO World Tennis Tournament and the 2011 Dubai Tennis Championships. He lost in the first round of the 2011 BNP Paribas Open, the third round of the 2011 Sony Ericsson Open, and the second round of the 2011 Monte-Carlo Rolex Masters. He then reached his first quarter-final of the year at the 2011 Barcelona Open Banco Sabadell, where he lost to Ivan Dodig. He reached his first final in over a year at the 2011 Serbia Open in Belgrade, where he lost to Novak Djokovic. He played a memorable match at the 2011 Mutua Madrid Open, where he lost to Roger Federer. López made it to the third round of the 2011 Rome Open, but lost to fellow countryman Rafael Nadal. López lost in the first round of the 2011 French Open to Roger Federer.

López started the grass court season at the 2011 Aegon Open with a second round loss to Andy Roddick. At Wimbledon, López defeated Michael Berrer in the first round, former semi-finalist Rainer Schüttler in the second round, and former world no. 1 and three-time finalist Andy Roddick in the third round. In the fourth round, López stormed back from two sets to love down to take out Polish qualifier Łukasz Kubot. In his third quarter-final appearance at Wimbledon, López lost to world no. 4 Andy Murray in straight sets.

López helped his country in the 2011 Davis Cup by beating American Mardy Fish in five sets. He was scheduled to play Andy Roddick in the fifth and final match, but Spain was already up 3–1 over the United States. Spain won that year's Davis Cup without his help, beating Argentina in the December final.

Feliciano made it to the quarter-finals of the 2011 Suisse Open by defeating Michael Lammer and Daniel Gimeno Traver in the first two rounds. However, he lost to fellow countryman and top seed Nicolás Almagro in straight sets. He beat Radek Štěpánek in the first round of the 2011 Rogers Cup, but lost to Mardy Fish in the second. He recorded a big win over fellow countryman and former world number one Juan Carlos Ferrero in the first round of the 2011 Western & Southern Open. He lost in the following round to Philipp Kohlschreiber. At the US Open, he lost in the third round, again to Murray.

At the 2011 Shanghai Rolex Masters, López beat ninth seed Janko Tipsarević, Alex Bogomolov Jr., sixth seed Tomáš Berdych, and Florian Mayer, before losing in the semi-finals to third seed David Ferrer.

=== 2012: Australian Open fourth round ===
López played in Sydney to tune up for the Australian Open. He had a bye in the first round, then lost to Julien Benneteau in straight sets in the second.

At the Australian Open, he beat John Isner in the third round to set up a match with eventual finalist Rafael Nadal in the fourth, but succumbed in straight sets.

He reached the semi-finals in Houston, where Isner took his revenge, beating López in three sets with two tie-breakers. In Barcelona, he beat Flavio Cipolla and Jarkko Nieminen, only to fall to compatriot David Ferrer in the quarter-finals. In Munich, he beat Australian Bernard Tomic in the quarter-finals, but was defeated by Philipp Kohlschreiber in the semi-finals. After his successes on clay, he had a disappointing grass season. At Wimbledon, he lost to Jarkko Nieminen in the first round. Back on clay, he made the quarter-finals in Gstaad, only to be beaten by Brazilian Thomaz Bellucci.

At the 2012 Olympics, he beat Russian Dmitry Tursunov and Argentine Juan Mónaco, but was defeated by Frenchman Jo-Wilfried Tsonga in straight sets with one tie-breaker.

At the US Open, he beat Robin Haase and compatriot Pablo Andújar, but could not stand up to eventual champion Andy Murray in the third round, against whom he lost in four sets with three tie-breakers. In Beijing, he beat Americans Ryan Harrison and Sam Querrey, before bowing again to Tsonga, retiring at 1–4 in the second set. In Shanghai, he defeated Kohlschreiber in straight sets to set up a meeting with Novak Djokovic, to whom he lost in straight sets.

=== 2013: Third ATP title ===
López played in Sydney as a tune-up event for the 2013 Australian Open. He beat Jérémy Chardy in the opening round in three sets, but he lost in the second round to Kevin Anderson in straight sets. At the Australian Open, he went out in straight sets in the second round to Radek Štěpánek.

In Memphis, López made it to the final, but was turned away by Kei Nishikori. At the French Open he lost in the third round to compatriot and eventual finalist David Ferrer. The week before Wimbledon, López won his first grass-court title by beating Gilles Simon in three sets in the final of the Aegon International in Eastbourne.

=== 2014: Fourth ATP title ===
López reached the final of the prestigious Aegon Championships in June and had a championship point against Grigor Dimitrov, but was eventually beaten in a deciding set tiebreak. However, one week later, López successfully defended his Aegon International title, defeating Richard Gasquet for the first time in six attempts, 7–5 in the deciding set.

López then continued his impressive grass-court form into the third Grand Slam of the year, Wimbledon. He saw off both Yūichi Sugita and Ante Pavić in straight sets in the first and second rounds, respectively. He then met John Isner in the third round. It was a match dominated by serve. López fought back from a set down to win 3 sets to 1, securing the first break of serve in the match in the penultimate game. López thus progressed to the fourth round, where he met Stan Wawrinka, the fifth seed. López lost, despite having several set points in the second-set tiebreak.

López won over seeded players Tomáš Berdych and Milos Raonic at the Rogers Cup to reach his third Masters 1000 semi-final, after which he lost to Roger Federer. At the 2014 US Open, he was defeated by Dominic Thiem in the third round. The Spaniard claimed wins over Rafael Nadal, John Isner, and Mikhail Youzhny at the 2014 Shanghai Masters, then lost the semi-final match to Gilles Simon.

=== 2015: Career high singles ranking ===
López made the fourth round of the 2015 Australian Open, losing to Milos Raonic in five sets. He then entered the new ATP 250 event, the Ecuador Open in Quito, Ecuador and reached the final, losing to Víctor Estrella Burgos. López lost in the first round of the 2015 French Open.

=== 2016: French Open doubles title, Fifth ATP title ===
In 2016 Lopez achieved one of the greatest highlights of his career by winning the French Open men's doubles championship along with compatriot Marc López.

On 6 September 2016, López was part of the last match ever played in the old Louis Armstrong Stadium at the US Open. Alongside his partner Marc López, they defeated the Bryan brothers (Bob and Mike) in the quarter-finals of the men's doubles tournament, the score 7–6^{(7–2)}, 4–6, 6–3. The pair eventually lost in the semi-finals against fellow countrymen Pablo Carreño Busta and Guillermo García López in straight sets.

=== 2017: Sixth ATP title ===
López started the year representing Spain in the Hopman Cup, along with Lara Arruabarrena, but didn't make it past the round robin. In the Auckland Open, he was seeded 6th and won in the first round to Michael Venus, in three sets, but withdrew in the second round to Jérémy Chardy.

He lost in the first round of the 2017 Australian Open to Fabio Fognini in straight sets, where he achieved the wooden spoon. In the Open Sud de France, he beat Julien Benneteau in three sets in the first round but then lost to Benoît Paire in the second round. López appeared at the 2017 ABN AMRO World Tennis Tournament but lost to Pierre-Hugues Herbert in the first round. López also appeared in the 2017 Abierto Mexicano Telcel but lost in the first round to Jordan Thompson. At the Indian Wells Masters he lost in the second round to Dušan Lajović.

In June López won the Men's Singles title at Queen's Club Championships (the Aegon Championships at The Queen's Club, London), beating Marin Čilić 4–6, 7–6^{(7–2)}, 7–6^{(10–8)}, which was his sixth career title and third on grass.

=== 2018–19: Singles & Doubles titles at Queens Club, Davis Cup winner ===
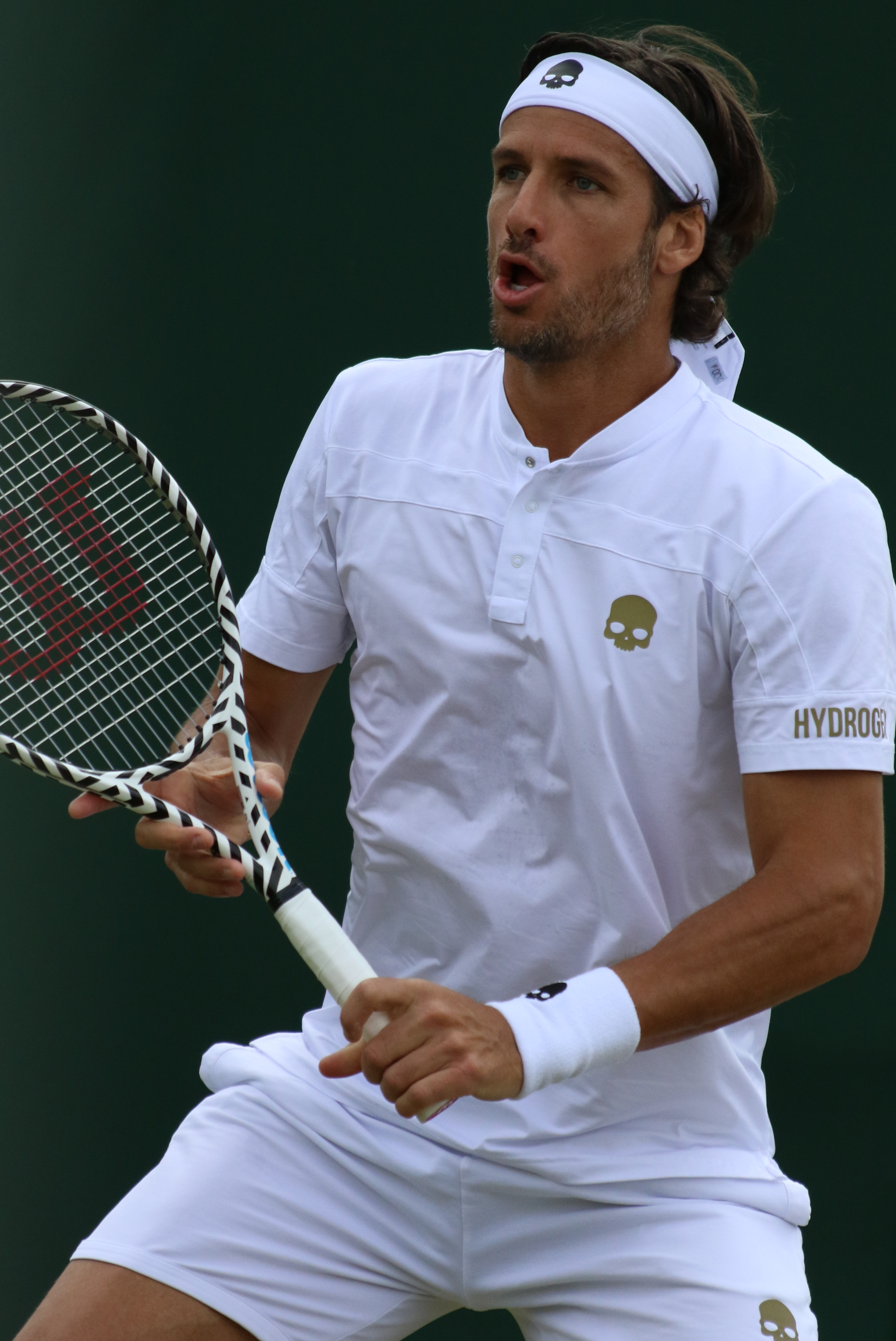
López at the 2019 Wimbledon Championships

After a disappointing 2018 in which he failed to progress beyond the quarterfinals in any of the tournaments he played, López went through the first few months with defeats to younger opponents. His year began with a first-round loss to Jordan Thompson at the Australian Open, then continued with a loss to Denis Istomin at Delray Beach in the first round, a defeat by Alex de Minaur at the Acapulco Open, and second-round defeats to Karen Khachanov and Grigor Dimitrov at Indian Wells and Miami, respectively before finishing out the North American hard court tour with a loss to Alexander Bublik in the quarterfinals at Monterrey.

The clay court season was also unfruitful with first-round losses in each of the tournaments he entered. This culminated with losses to Thomas Fabbiano in the Monte Carlo qualifying rounds, Fernando Verdasco in Barcelona, Damir Džumhur in Geneva, and Ivo Karlović at Roland Garros.

The grass-court season was much more productive, as he made the round of 16 at Surbiton, losing to Ivo Karlović, then made the round of 32 at Stuttgart, losing to Lucas Pouille. He then won both the singles and doubles titles at the Queens Club Championships with a three-set singles win over Gilles Simon and a champion tie-break doubles win (partnering with Andy Murray) over Rajeev Ram and Joe Salisbury.

=== 2021: Record Grand Slam & Masters appearances, 500th win, out of Top 100, Top 5 win ===
At the 2021 Australian Open Lopez reached the third round for the ninth time in his career defeating Australian wildcard Li Tu and 31st seed Lorenzo Sonego in five sets. He was the oldest player to win a major match from two sets down since Ken Rosewall at the 1974 Wimbledon Championships. He also was the oldest player to reach the third round of the Australian Open since 1978. Melbourne was the 75th Grand Slam he has played in a row, having not missed one since the 2002 French Open. He lost to seventh seed Andrey Rublev.

He lost in the first round at the 2021 Wimbledon Championships to 26th seed Daniel Evans but attained also a new record when he appeared in his 77th consecutive Grand Slam. Lopez played his 138th Masters 1000 tournament at the 2021 National Bank Open. As a result, he tied Roger Federer for the most appearances at the Masters’ events.

At the 2021 US Open he was eliminated in the first round by fellow countryman and qualifier Bernabé Zapata Miralles in a five set match. This was his 78th appearance in a consecutive Slam and 79th overall. As a result, he dropped out of the top 100 to No. 110 on 20 September 2021, his 40th birthday.

Lopez played his 139th Masters 1000 tournament at the 2021 Indian Wells Masters. As a result, he now owns the record for the most appearances in the Masters 1000 category.

During 2021 Davis Cup Finals, he represented Spanish Davis Cup team in both singles and doubles. He won both his singles matches. In the tie against Russia, aged 40, he won his tie against world No. 5, Andrey Rublev, which is only the second time in Open Era history that a player aged 40+ managed to beat a top 5 player. Before Lopez, the only other 40+ player who managed to beat a top 5 ranked player was Ken Rosewall, who, at the age of 42 scored a win against Vitas Gerulaitis at 1977 Sidney Indoors.

=== 2022: Record 79th consecutive & 81st overall Major appearances, Sixth doubles title ===
In January, at 2022 Australian Open, Feliciano lost in the first round in four sets to home favorite John Millman. It was his record 79th consecutive Grand Slam appearance and 80th overall putting him one Major away from Roger Federer's record of 81 overall appearances.

In February, he won the Mexican Open doubles tournament partnering with Stefanos Tsitsipas.

He failed to qualify for the 2022 French Open ending his consecutive appearances streak at this Major, also a record of 21, and overall in Majors. At the same tournament in doubles however, he reached the third round partnering Maxime Cressy.

With his participation in the 2022 Wimbledon Championships he made his 81st main draw Grand Slam appearance, equaling Roger Federer's record. He was defeated in the first round by the No. 21 seed Botic van de Zandschulp. Due to the ATP decision that Wimbledon will not be awarded ranking points and therefore players could not defend points from 2021, Feliciano automatically fell out of top 250, regardless of his Wimbledon result.

=== 2023: 93rd ATP career quarterfinal, oldest quarterfinalist since 1995, 4th in most aces career list, Retirement ===
On 1 January, Lopez announced that the 2023 season will be his last after 25 years on the tour.

In February, he further stated that he would like to retire at Queen's Club, a tournament he won several times in the past, two times in singles (2017, 2019) and one time in doubles (2019), if they give him a wildcard.

After receiving a main draw wildcard for the Mexican Open in Acapulco, in the first round Lopez defeated Christopher Eubanks in straight sets and scored his 504th singles career win. In the round of 16, he lost to the sixth seed Frances Tiafoe.

He accepted a wildcard for the 2023 Barcelona Open Banc Sabadell, for the 2023 BOSS Open. He also received a wildcard for the qualifying draw at the 2023 Queen's Club Championships.

At the 2023 Mallorca Championships, the final tournament of his career, he received wildcards in both singles and doubles. In doubles, teamed with Stefanos Tsitsipas, the pair lost in the first round to the No. 1 seeds, Santiago González and Édouard Roger-Vasselin. In singles, Lopez beat Australian Max Purcell in the first round, in straight sets. After the match, according to ATP stats, his new haul of 10,261 untouched serves puts him fourth on the most aces in career list. In the second round he beat another Australian, Jordan Thompson, to reach his 93rd ATP career quarterfinal and his second quarterfinal at this tournament, previously reaching the same stage in 2021. He also became the oldest ATP quarterfinalist since 1995. In the quarterfinals, he lost to German Yannick Hanfmann, which was to be his last professional match. He completed his career with a 506-490 tour-level singles record, having won more matches on grass (87) than any other Spaniard.

== Modelling and endorsements ==
López has appeared as a model for the likes of Hugo Boss and Elle, and endorses Braun shavers and L'Oréal products. He has professed to dislike being called a model, however, and states that he wants to be seen only as a tennis player. He has been endorsed by Ellesse tennis clothing since 2016; before that, Joma was his endorser and Nike endorses his shoes.

== Personal life ==
López was born in Toledo and now lives in Madrid. He grew up with his younger brother, Victor López Díaz-Guerra (b. 1982), who also played professional tennis.

López was married to model Alba Carrillo from July 2015 to March 2017. The couple had been separated since June 2016. He married model Sandra Gago in September 2019, and their first child, son Dario was born in 2021.

On 30 November 2017, López was announced as the Madrid Open tournament director, commencing in 2019.

== Career statistics ==
=== Grand Slam performance timeline ===
Key
W	F	SF	QF	#R	RR	Q#	P#	DNQ	A	Z#	PO	G	S	B	NMS	NTI	P	NH

(W) winner; (F) finalist; (SF) semifinalist; (QF) quarterfinalist; (#R) rounds 4, 3, 2, 1; (RR) round-robin stage; (Q#) qualification round; (P#) preliminary round; (DNQ) did not qualify; (A) absent; (Z#) Davis/Fed Cup Zonal Group (with number indication) or (PO) play-off; (G) gold, (S) silver or (B) bronze Olympic/Paralympic medal; (NMS) not a Masters tournament; (NTI) not a Tier I tournament; (P) postponed; (NH) not held; (SR) strike rate (events won / competed); (W–L) win–loss record.
To avoid confusion and double counting, these charts are updated at the conclusion of a tournament or when the player's participation has ended.

==== Singles ====
Tournament	2000	2001	2002	2003	2004	2005	2006	2007	2008	2009	2010	2011	2012	2013	2014	2015	2016	2017	2018	2019	2020	2021	2022	2023	SR	W–L	Win%
Australian Open	A	A	A	3R	1R	3R	3R	2R	2R	1R	3R	2R	4R	2R	3R	4R	3R	1R	1R	1R	1R	3R	1R	A	0 / 20	24–20	55%
French Open	A	1R	2R	1R	4R	1R	1R	1R	1R	2R	1R	1R	1R	3R	2R	1R	3R	3R	1R	1R	1R	1R	Q1	A	0 / 21	12–21	36%
Wimbledon	Q2	A	4R	4R	3R	QF	1R	3R	QF	1R	3R	QF	1R	3R	4R	2R	3R	1R	2R	2R	NH	1R	1R	A	0 / 20	34–20	63%
US Open	A	A	2R	1R	3R	2R	2R	4R	1R	1R	4R	3R	3R	3R	3R	QF	2R	3R	1R	3R	1R	1R	A	A	0 / 20	28–20	58%
Win–loss	0–0	0–1	5–3	5–4	7–4	7–4	3–4	6–4	5–4	1–4	7–4	7–4	5–4	7–4	8–4	8–4	7–4	4–4	1–4	3–4	0–3	2–4	0–2	0–0	0 / 81	98–81	55%

==== Doubles ====
Tournament	2003	2004	2005	2006	2007	2008	2009	2010	2011	2012	2013	2014	2015	2016	2017	2018	2019	2020	2021	2022	2023	SR	W–L	Win%
Australian Open	1R	2R	1R	2R	A	3R	QF	2R	2R	A	1R	1R	QF	2R	3R	2R	1R	1R	A	A	A	0 / 16	15–16	50%
French Open	3R	1R	1R	1R	2R	A	1R	A	2R	A	3R	3R	2R	W	1R	SF	2R	3R	A	3R	A	1 / 16	24–14	63%
Wimbledon	1R	2R	2R	A	A	3R	A	A	A	A	A	2R	A	A	1R	A	2R	NH	1R	1R	A	0 / 9	6–7	55%
US Open	3R	QF	3R	1R	2R	QF	A	1R	A	A	2R	1R	1R	SF	F	2R	2R	A	A	2R	A	0 / 15	23–15	61%
Win–loss	3–4	5–4	3–3	1–3	2–2	6–2	3–2	1–2	2–1	0–0	3–3	3–4	4–3	11–2	7–4	6–3	3–4	2–2	0–1	3–3	0–0	1 / 56	68–52	57%

=== Grand Slam finals ===
==== Doubles: 2 (1 title, 1 runner-up) ====
Result	Year	Tournament	Surface	Partner	Opponents	Score
Win	2016	French Open	Clay	(Spain) Marc López	(United States) Bob Bryan (United States) Mike Bryan	6–4, 6–7^{(6–8)}, 6–3
Loss	2017	US Open	Hard	(Spain) Marc López	(Netherlands) Jean-Julien Rojer (Romania) Horia Tecău	4–6, 3–6

=== Olympic medal finals ===
==== Doubles: 1 (1 fourth place) ====
Result	Year	Tournament	Surface	Partner	Opponents	Score
4th place	2012	Summer Olympics, London	Grass	(Spain) David Ferrer	(France) Julien Benneteau (France) Richard Gasquet	6–7^{(4–7)}, 2–6

== Records ==
- These records were attained in the Open Era.
- Records in **bold** indicate peerless achievements.
- Records in italics are currently active streaks.

Time span	Record accomplished	#	Players matched
2002 French Open – 2022 Australian Open	Most consecutive Grand Slam main draw appearances	79	**Stands alone**
1998 Barcelona Open – 2023 Barcelona Open	Most ATP 500 main draw appearances at single tournament	22	**Stands alone**
2001 French Open – 2022 Wimbledon	Most main draw appearances at each Grand Slam	20	Novak Djokovic
1998–2023	Most ATP 500 main draw appearances	97	**Stands alone**
2002–2023	Most Hard surface main draw appearances	279	**Stands alone**
1998–2023	Most Outdoor main draw appearances	394	**Stands alone**
1998–2023	Most ATP main draw appearances	486	**Stands alone**
1998–2023	Most ATP main draw losses	490	**Stands alone**
