= SA Tennis Open =

Defunct tennis tournament
- Founded: 2009
- Abolished: 2011
- Editions: 3
- Location: Johannesburg; South Africa
- Venue: Montecasino
- Category: ATP World Tour 250 series
- Surface: Hard
- Draw: 32S/16D
- Prize money: US$442,500
- Website: SA Tennis Open

Current champions (2011)
- Singles: (South Africa) Kevin Anderson
- Doubles: (United States) James Cerretani (Canada) Adil Shamasdin

The SA Tennis Open was a professional men's tennis tournament in South Africa that ran for three years from 2009 to 2011. It marked the return of tennis at the ATP level to South Africa since the South African Open folded, but does not claim its predecessor's history.

The tournament was played on outdoor hard courts, each February at Montecasino in Johannesburg.

== Results ==
=== Singles ===
Year	Champions	Runner-up	Score
2011	(South Africa) Kevin Anderson	(India) Somdev Devvarman	4–6, 6–3, 6–2
2010	(Spain) Feliciano López	(France) Stéphane Robert	7–5, 6–1
2009	(France) Jo-Wilfried Tsonga	(France) Jérémy Chardy	6–4, 7–6^{(7–5)}

=== Doubles ===
Year	Champions	Runners-up	Score
2011	(United States) James Cerretani (Canada) Adil Shamasdin	(United States) Scott Lipsky (United States) Rajeev Ram	6–3, 3–6, [10–7]
2010	(India) Rohan Bopanna (Pakistan) Aisam-ul-Haq Qureshi	(Slovakia) Karol Beck (Israel) Harel Levy	6–2, 3–6, [10–5]
2009	(United States) James Cerretani (Belgium) Dick Norman	(South Africa) Rik de Voest (Australia) Ashley Fisher	6–7^{(7–9)}, 6–2, [14–12]

== See also ==
- South African Open
